= Fantaghirò 4 =

- Written by: Gianni Romoli
- Directed by: Lamberto Bava
- Starring: Alessandra Martines; Brigitte Nielsen; Horst Buchholz; Nicholas Rogers
- Music by: Amedeo Minghi
- Country of origin: Italy
- Original language: Italian

Production
- Producers: Lamberto Bava; Andrea Piazzesi
- Cinematography: Romano Albani
- Editor: Piero Bozza

Original release
- Release: 19 December 1994

Fantaghirò 4 (alternately titled as The Cave of the Golden Rose 4) is the fourth film from the Fantaghirò series. Released in 1994, it was directed by Lamberto Bava and stars Alessandra Martines as the title character. The film was released on television as a two-parter, and is known in some releases as Fantaghirò 7 and Fantaghirò 8 due to previous instalments having been split into two parts each as well.

In Fantaghirò 4, after a mysterious black cloud destroys Fantaghirò's castle, she allies herself with Prince Parsel to track the black cloud to its origins and stop whoever is casting it. This film featured very few returning characters from the previous films, and most notable is that Kim Rossi Stuart, the hero of the previous films, did not return at all. In order to circumvent this, his character was written to accommodate a different actor, and footage of the first film was re-used for the finale.

== Plot ==
A mysterious black cloud is travelling across the land, bringing death and destruction wherever it goes. Fantaghirò is helping the people of her kingdom escape to safety when she crosses paths with young Prince Parsel. Parsel is chasing the black cloud because it took his castle, and he is trying to find a way to get it back. When the black cloud passes over Fantaghirò's castle, it too disappears, so she joins with Parsel to search for the origins of the black cloud. They travel to the kingdom of Tohor where they discover that Tarabas, the reformed dark wizard, has been imprisoned and accused of conjuring the black cloud. Fantaghirò, who knows that he has renounced his evil ways, helps him escape. Fantaghirò, Tarabas, Parsel and Princess Angelica of Tohor (who has fallen in love with Tarabas) leave Tohor to track down the black cloud, which they discover is conjured by a powerful dark magician named Darken.

Elsewhere, the evil Black Witch is struggling to restore her magical powers, which have weakened after she had helped Fantaghirò in her previous adventure against Tarabas. She revives Tarabas' mother Xellesia, who was killed by her rebellious gnomes, and the two witches fly off to find Tarabas and prevent him from discovering the origins of the dark cloud. Fantaghirò and her group have tracked the black cloud to Nekrad, a kingdom beneath a dormant volcano. There, they encounter a deformed man named Fiodor who tells them that the kingdom is ruled by Darken. Darken then emerges from Parsel's body, where he has been hiding from the very beginning. A fight ensues, and Fantaghirò is killed. An enraged Tarabas attempts to kill Darken, but Xellesia arrives and stops him. It is then revealed that Darken is Tarabas' father, and the black cloud was part of an elaborate plot to bring Tarabas back to his evil ways.

Darken promises to bring Fantaghirò back to life if Tarabas will embrace his dark side again. Tarabas is reluctant, but Fiodor talks him into it. It is revealed that Fiodor is actually Romualdo, transformed by Darken into a hideous monster in order to torment him with never being able to return to Fantaghirò. Fiodor also makes Tarabas promise to take care of Fantaghirò. Tarabas finally agrees to become evil again if it means that Fantaghirò can live, and Darken revives her. While Tarabas tries to convince Darken of his evil "honesty", Fantaghirò conspires with Fiodor, Angelica and a revived Parsel to rescue the stolen castles from Darken's collection and escape from the underground kingdom. After Darken is temporarily subdued, Tarabas, Xellesia and a reluctant Black Witch join the group in escaping from Darken's kingdom. Along the way, Xellesia sacrifices herself so her son will be safe.

Darken follows the group, and another fight ensues. In the end, Darken is defeated and Fantaghirò's castle is restored to its full glory. Fantaghirò has also realised that Fiodor is her beloved Romualdo. Fiodor tries to escape, embarrassed by his new form, but Fantaghirò insists that she does not love him for his looks. Tarabas is touched by Fantaghirò's devotion to Romualdo and decides to move on with his life, promising Angelica that he will learn to love her. In the end, Fiodor transforms back into Romualdo (using edited footage from the first film), and the pair are reunited.

== Cast ==
- Alessandra Martines as Fantaghirò
- Nicholas Rogers as Tarabas
- Horst Buchholz as Darken
- Ursula Andress as Xellesia
- Brigitte Nielsen as the Black Witch
- Marc de Jonge as Tohor
- Riccardo Serventi Longhi as Fiodor
- Agathe de La Fontaine as Angelica
- Gaia Bulferi Bulferetti as Parsel
- Oreste Guidi as Rufus
- Kim Rossi Stuart as Romualdo (cameos)

== Production ==
Fantaghirò 4 was shot over ten and a half weeks in Moravia for the main locations of the story, and in Thailand for the scenes taking place in the fictional kingdom of Tohor.

Kim Rossi Stuart, the male lead of the franchise as Romualdo, refused to take part in the film, forcing the writer Gianni Romoli to create the film's plot in relation to the absence of Romualdo. The final scene where Romualdo reverts back to his likeness in front of the mirror was made by using old footage played backwards. The part where he kisses Fantaghirò ar the end is exactly the same scene from the ending of the first film with modified dialogue.

The fourth installment closes the first cycle of the saga. The following film, Fantaghirò 5, was planned as the beginning of a trilogy that was never completed. The protagonist would have travelled through several parallel worlds before being returned to her kingdom by Romualdo.

Director Lamberto Bava said he had "two goals: to improve the quality and to renew the themes." Alessandra Martines said, "I love the character of Fantaghirò, but I brought her to the doctor. The fact is that I found a new stimulus in an innovative screenplay: my heroine is still a crazy head, rebellious and mischievous, but she learned to be wiser." Romoli, who wrote the story and the screenplay, said it have levels, the easiest being the archetypes and good feelings, and the other being "more complex and adulthood, sophisticated psychologically, involving identity conflicts of the characters." His inspiration for the fourth film in the series was Krzysztof Kieślowski's Three Colors: Blue: "Fantaghirò has lost everything: family, castle, kingdom. And she can emerge psychologically from that 'mourning' only through 'adventure'."
