= Nicholas Rogers (actor) =

Australian actor

- Born: 6 March 1969 (age 57); Sydney, Australia
- Occupations: Actor, model
- Years active: 1993―2005

Nicholas Rogers is an Australian model and actor. He is best known for his role of the wizard Tarabas in the Fantaghirò series.

== Early life ==
He was born in Sydney on 6 March 1969, the second of three children. Living in a house right next to the coastline, he grew to love the sea and the ocean, especially water sports like swimming, surfing, etc. He was not an obedient child; he was even expelled from school because he missed a lesson to spend some time at the seaside. This behaviour didn't stop him from graduating and starting a bright career.

== Career ==
At the age of 20 he went to New York and began working as a model. He was eager to try modeling as he thought of it as a short-term occupation to which he would dedicate only a year or two of his life. It turned out that he quite enjoyed those years because, despite taking a break from the fashion industry for a while, he continued to model and to be the face of famous brands long after. One day he received a call from the Italian director Lamberto Bava, who gave him an important role in his Fantaghirò series, playing the wicked wizard Tarabas, alongside the Italian actress Alessandra Martines. Rogers was chosen amongst hundreds of candidates for the role of Tarabas.

Bava called on the actor to co-star in The Princess and the Poor (1997) and later in the 1999 mini-series Caraibi. In 1998, he was chosen to play Lorenzo in the movie Laura non-c'e by Antonio Bonifacio.

He continued to work as a model and pitchman for companies such as Karl Lagerfeld and Rayban.

In 2005 he was the protagonist of The Razor's Edge, a short film set in post-apocalyptic Australia.

== Recognition ==
- German "Pop Rocky" award as best actor (1998)

== Filmography ==
- 1993: Fantaghirò 3 by Lamberto Bava: Tarabas
- 1994: Fantaghirò 4 by Lamberto Bava: Tarabas
- 1997: The Princess and the Poor by Lamberto Bava: Ademaro
- 1998: Laura non c'è by Antonio Bonifacio: Lorenzo
- 1999: Caraibi (Pirates, Blood Brothers) by Lamberto Bava: Ferrante Albrizzi
- 2000: Maria, Madre de Jesus by Fabrizio Costa: Jesus
- 2005: The Razor's edge by Gabriel Dowrick

== Projects in the music industry ==
- 1995: Nicholas Rogers took part in the video of the French song "Larsen" alongside the singer herself – the famous Zazie.
