= The Dragon Ring =

- DVD cover
- Genre: Fantasy
- Written by: Gianni Romoli
- Directed by: Lamberto Bava
- Starring: Franco Nero; Anna Falchi
- Music by: Amedeo Minghi
- Country of origin: Italy
- Original language: Italian
- No. of episodes: 2

Production
- Producers: Lamberto Bava; Andrea Piazzesi
- Cinematography: Romano Albani
- Editor: Piero Bozza
- Running time: 186 minutes

Original release
- Release: January 2 – January 4, 1994

Desideria e l'Anello del Drago (also known as Desideria and The Dragon Ring) is an Italian fantasy television miniseries directed by Lamberto Bava and starring Anna Falchi. The story is similar in style and direction as Lamberto Bava's more successful Fantaghirò series.

== Plot ==
The Dragon King and Queen, rulers of a powerful kingdom, have two daughters. Desideria, the eldest daughter and Selvaggia, a sorceress they adopted. Although she is constantly playing tricks to get her elder sister in trouble, she is frequently praised as being the smarter and better daughter.

As the eldest birth daughter of the Dragon King, Desideria is due to inherit the Dragon Ring, the highest symbol of power in the kingdom, but she can only do so once she has chosen a husband. Unfortunately, the prince that finally catches her attention is Prince Victor, a rebel prince who has fought against her father and is to be sentenced to death for his treachery.

Desideria helps Victor escape from the castle dungeons, but her father catches her in the act and she is punished. The Dragon King decides to let all the princes in his conquered kingdoms fight in a tournament for her hand in marriage, but when Desideria sees that all the princes are selfish, cruel men, she runs away. When the Dragon King discovers that she has fled, he declares that Desideria has forfeited her right to the throne and Selvaggia will become the new prize. But unknown to him, the jealous Selvaggia wants to destroy her elder sister completely.

Desideria eventually ends up in the desert, where she is saved from the Witches of the Sand by none other than Prince Victor himself. She learns from him and other rebels in his camp that her beloved father is in actuality a cruel and vicious ruler. Just as she agrees to fight at Victor's side, Selvaggia casts a spell from the castle, causing Victor to fall in love with her and rush to join the tournament to win Selvaggia's hand.

== Cast ==
- Anna Falchi as Desideria
- Franco Nero as Dragon King
- Sophie von Kessel as Princess Selvaggia ("Wild" in English-dubbed version)
- Joel Beeson as Prince Victor
- Billie Zöckler as Nurse
- Ute Christensen as the Dragon Queen
- Karel Roden as Prince Lisandro
- Stefania Sandrelli as The Fairy of Crystal Sword Lake
- Marek Vasut as King Karl
- Oldrich Bartik as Old Man
- Nikol Štíbrová as Princess Desideria at age 5
- Zuzana Rybárová as Princess Desideria at age 10
- Katarina Litomericka as Princess Selvaggia at age 8
- Jan Kolinsky as Prince Victor at age 6
- Vladimir "Furdo" Furdik as Prince Sigismondo
- Stanislav Satko as Prince Merlik
- Lubomir Misak as Prince Parsel

== Similarity to Fantaghirò ==
The film has a few similarities with the more successful Fantaghirò franchise also directed by Lamberto Bava, including but not limited to filming style and special effects. In this film, Victor falls in love with Desideria without ever seeing her face, and he can only recognise her by her voice. In Fantaghirò, or The Cave of the Golden Rose, Prince Romualdo falls in love with Fantaghirò without properly seeing her face, and he can only recognise her by her eyes. Another similarity is that the wicked Selvaggia casts a spell to make Victor fall in love with her, to hurt Desideria. In Fantaghirò 2, the wicked Black Witch casts a spell to make Romualdo fall in love with her, to hurt Fantaghirò. One more similarity is that both Desideria and Fantaghirò dress up as men so that they can fight in a tournament without anyone knowing that they are women.

== Reception ==
The film received generally favorable reviews from critics.

== See also ==
- Fantaghirò
