= Dowrick =

Dowrick is a surname. Notable people with the surname include:

- Gabriel Dowrick (born 1983), Australian screenwriter and editor
- McKenzie Dowrick (born 2000), Australian rules footballer
- Stephanie Dowrick (born 1947), Australian writer, minister, and social activist
