= Fantaghirò (film) =

- German DVD cover
- Written by: Francesca Melandri; Gianni Romoli
- Directed by: Lamberto Bava
- Starring: Alessandra Martines; Kim Rossi Stuart; Mario Adorf
- Music by: Amedeo Minghi
- Country of origin: Italy
- Original language: Italian

Production
- Producers: Lamberto Bava; Andrea Piazzesi; Roberto Bessi
- Cinematography: Romano Albani
- Editor: Piero Bozza
- Running time: 200 minutes (two parts)

Original release
- Network: Canale 5
- Release: 22 December 1991

Fantaghirò (also known as The Cave of the Golden Rose) is a fantasy television film produced by Reteitalia, directed by Lamberto Bava and starring Alessandra Martines. It originally aired in 1991 as a two-parter, and hence has been known in certain video releases and airings as double-set of Fantaghirò 1 and Fantaghirò 2 (not to be confused with the sequel, Fantaghirò 2). It is the first installment in the Fantaghirò series and is loosely based on the Italian folktale Fanta-Ghirò the Beautiful.

== Plot ==
For many centuries two kingdoms have been at war with each other, though neither side remembers what the war is for. In one of the kingdoms, the warrior king has three daughters: Catherine, Caroline, and Fantaghirò. Although Catherine and Caroline are well-behaved princesses, Fantaghirò is outspoken, and rebellious, and longs to fight in battle. She constantly argues with her father and two sisters who disapprove of her behaviour.

Fantaghirò secretly learns to fight when she befriends the White Knight, a mysterious warrior whom she meets in the forest. As they are training, she briefly crosses paths with Romualdo, the newly crowned king ruler of the neighbouring enemy kingdom. Romualdo is enchanted by Fantaghirò's eyes but is unaware that they belong to the daughter of his sworn enemy.

Romualdo is tired of the war and sends an offer of a single duel to determine the outcome. Fantaghirò's father is told by the magical White Witch that only one of his daughters can win that duel. Seeing no other option, the King commands his three daughters to disguise themselves as male knights so they may fight Romualdo.

Fantaghirò relishes the opportunity and cuts her hair to look like a man, but Catherine and Caroline are fearful. While travelling to Romualdo's kingdom disguised as knights, the three sisters argue about the outcome of their mission, and Catherine and Caroline decide that their younger sister is the most qualified to win. Catherine and Caroline return to their father and Fantaghirò continues on her journey.

Fantaghirò eventually meets with Romualdo, who is confused when he recognises her eyes. After various attempts by Romualdo to discover the real identity of the knight by trickery, they eventually battle and Fantaghirò emerges victorious. However, she cannot kill him and returns home in shame. Fantaghirò's father, who is proud of what his daughter has achieved, forgives her. The King also allows Romualdo to continue to rule his people, on the condition that he marries one of the three princesses. Although at first Romualdo is hesitant to agree when he sees and recognises Fantaghirò, the two kiss happily and the realms are united after decades of war.

== Cast ==
- Alessandra Martines as Fantaghirò
- Mario Adorf as King
- Kim Rossi Stuart as Romualdo
- Ángela Molina as the White Witch (White Knight/White Goose)
- Jean-Pierre Cassel as The General
- Stefano Davanzati as Cataldo
- Tomáš Valík as Ivaldo
- Ornella Marcucci as Catherine
- Kateřina Brožová as Caroline
- Stanislava Bartošová as Governess

== Production ==
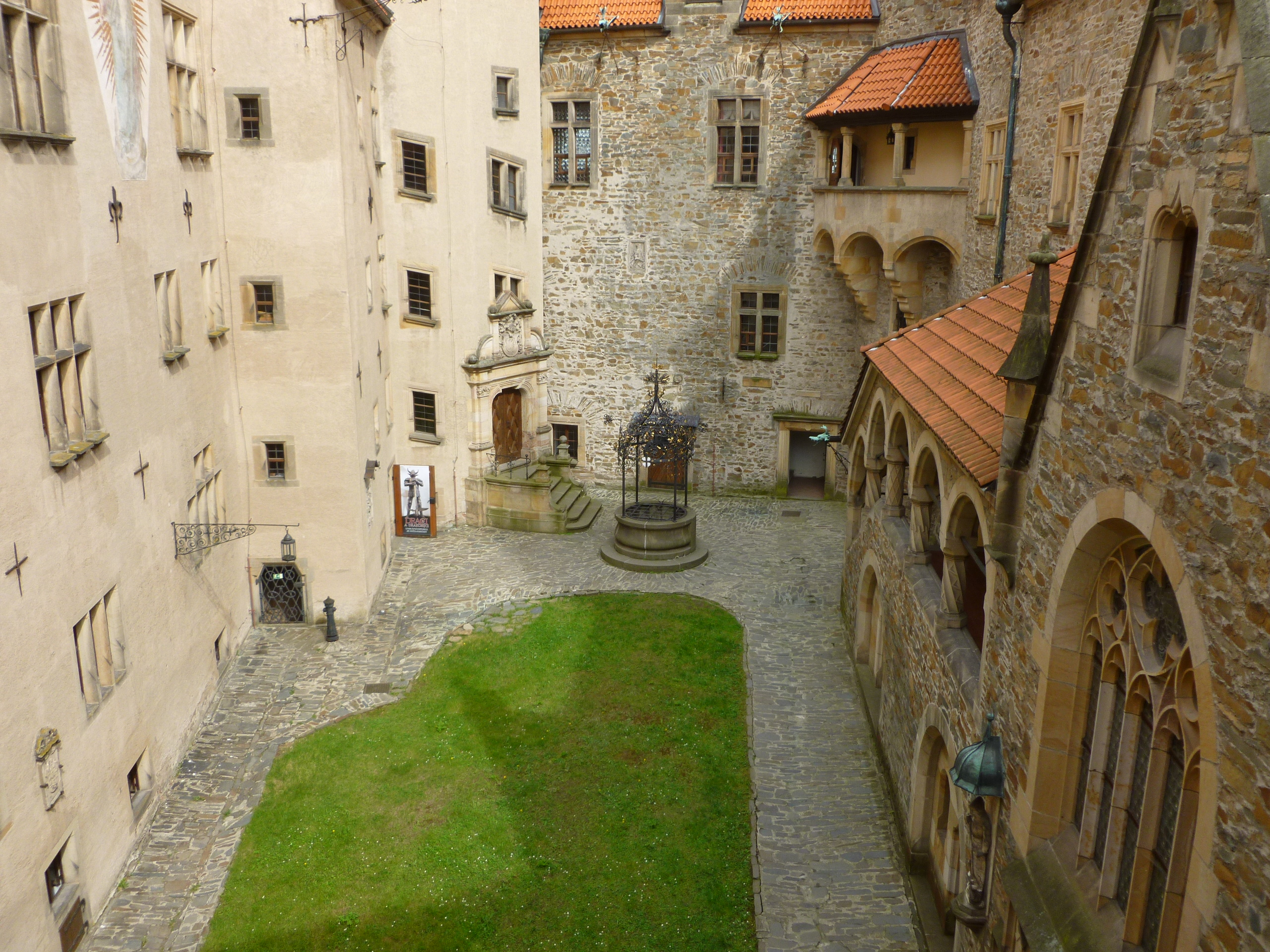
Inner courtyard of Bouzov Castle (Fantaghirò's castle) in 2012

Fantaghirò was inspired by one of Italian fairy tales collected by Italo Calvino and was shot in locations at Bouzov Castle, Pernštejn Castle, and Lednice in Czechoslovakia. The director Lamberto Bava recalled: "My father (Mario Bava) wanted to make an adaptation of Calvino's fairy tale, but he didn't have the opportunity. I took it back and with Mediaset we decided to co-produce it together. It was a risky and ambitious job, just think that for their part I didn't have a lira more than the initial budget. Many costumes that you see were from the inventory then we went to shoot in the castles of Prague where it was cheaper." Initially Fantaghirò was to be a single film but the production costs were excessive and so it was decided to make it into a miniseries. The first film was finished in 1990, but it was then shelved for a whole year; the sequels were approved when it turned out to be a success.

== Release ==
The film was originally aired on Canale 5 on 22 December 1991. Upon its Italian premiere, it was the most watched program of that evening, with over six and a half million viewers (27.50% market share). Kim Rossi Stuart's role as Romualdo gained him a national popularity.

== Sequel ==
In the 1992 sequel, the love of Fantaghirò and Romualdo is opposed by the evil Black Witch (Brigitte Nielsen), who steals the prince for herself and plots to eliminate the princess. Both films and the third sequel were later recut (reduced and intersected with each other) into a 200-minute compilation film titled La meravigliosa storia di Fantaghirò ("The Wonderful Story of Fantaghirò") in 1995.
