= 1996 in Italian television =

This is a list of Italian television related events from 1996.

== Events ==
=== RAI ===
- January 10: RAI president Letizia Moratti refuses to air Beppe Grillo's ecologist show Energia e informazione, produced by TSI and WDR. The official reason is an unhappy joke comparing Holocaust and gas pollution: "Eichmann gassed three million people for a distorted ideal, Romiti [FIAT general manager] gasses millions people for a bank account".
- January 22: debut of the political talk show Porta a porta, hosted by Bruno Vespa; his first guests are Romano Prodi and the show-girl Milly Carlucci. Already at the third airing, the show gets a huge public success with the confrontation between Silvio Berlusconi and Massimo D'Alema, followed by five million viewers.
- February 24: Ron and Tosca win the Sanremo Festival, hosted by Pippo Baudo and Sabrina Ferilli, with "Vorrei incontrarti fra cent'anni"; "La terra dei cachi" by Elio e le storie tese, a provocative song of political satire, is runner up and wins the Critics prize.
- April 19: at the eve of the political elections, Letizia Moratti resigns as RAI president, after having consolidated the balance sheet of the estate. Giuseppe Morello takes her places ad interim.
- May 13: Camera dei Deutati begins broadcasting on the Hot Bird stellite, airing the opening session of the 13. Legislature.
- June 19: the match Italy-Germany for UEFA Euro 1996 gets the highest ratings of the year, with 22 millions viewiers.
- July 10: after the victory of The olive tree at the elections, the RAI management is fully renewed. The writer Enzo Siciliano becomes president, Franco Iseppi general director, Liliana Cavani enters in the board of directors. The directors of the three RAI channels and of the news programs are changed too.
- September 9: all the RAI TV and radio channels are broadcast satellite by Hotbird.

=== Fininvest-Mediaset ===
- April 4: Massimo D'Alema, PDS secretary, in full election campaign, visits the Fininvest studios and calls the Berlusconi's estate "a national resource to be saved"; so, he breaks up with the traditional hostility of the Italian left towards the private television.
- April 19: at the eve of the elections, on Canale 5 debate between the leaders of the two opposite coalitions, Silvio Berlusconi and Romano Prodi; the match, moderated by Enrico Mentana, ends in a draw.
- July 16: Fininvest channels enter in the new society Mediaset, which is listed in the stock exchange with an 8.200 billion liras capital. With the operation, the Berlusconi’s firm reduces its debt level and its dependence by the creditors.
- August 28: the decree 444 by the Prodi cabinet prorogues the airing of Rete 4 till to the January 1997. The channel would have to go on satellite, according to a sentence of the Constitutional court.
- December 5: Michele Santoro debuts on Italia 1 with the talk show Moby Dick; the first episode arouses many quarrels for a "virtual interview" with Antonio Di Pietro (played by the impersonator Alessandro Villeggia). In the year, other two RAI stars (Paolo Bonolis and Pippo Baudo) pass to Mediaset, but the experience is successful only for Bonolis.

=== Other channels ===
- January 3: Italian television enter in the satellite era. debut of DSTV, the first Italian satellite pay-tv. The initial bouquet includes the three Telepiù channels and MTV Europe. In the summer, the offer grows, including also TMC and TMC2, the Italian versions of Cartoon Network and Discovery Channel, BBC News, CNN, ten radio channels and the service +Calcio, allowing to see every match of Serie A.
- February 28: the Cecchi Gori group buys the TV right for the Serie A; after complex negotiations, however, in December it resells most of them to RAI.
- June 1: Videomusic changes name in TMC2 and gradually turns from music to generalist channel.
- The toys entrepreneur Enrico Preziosi gets the direction of Junior TV; the syndication has a restyling and changes name in JTV.

=== Judiciary enquiries ===
Four years after Tangentopoli, a wave of judiciary enquiries invest also the Italian television.

- March 4: Il maresciallo Rocca is inquired by the antitrust office, because the accuses of hidden product placement made by Striscia la notizia and by a consumer's association; the popular serial is absolved.
- May 9: Pippo Baudo is inquired by the Milan tribunal, with the charge to have received payments off-the-book by the sponsors of his shows; in October, the enquiry involves also Mara Venier and Rosanna Lambertucci, host of a fitness program. In 1998, the three presenters are sentenced for concussion (Baudo to twenty months with probation), but the condemnation doesn't harm their careers.
- June 18: Gigi Sabani, the most popular Italian impersonator, is arrested for sexual harassment. The enquiry, nicknamed "Vallettopoli", involves also the showman Valerio Merola and the TV author Gianni Boncompagni. Also if all the defendants are absolved before the trial, the Sabani's career never recovers by the reputational damage.
- November 13: Pippo Baudo is inquired by the Milan tribunal as artistic director of the Sanremo festival; he's accused to have manipulated the contest, favouring the victory of Ron (see over). The charge is not proved.

== Awards ==
13. Telegatto award, for the season 1995–1996.

- Show of the year: Il Maresciallo Rocca.
- Man and woman of the year: Pippo Baudo and Mara Venier.
- Best TV movie: La voce del cuore.
- Best serial: Norma e Felice (for Italy), X-Files (for abroad) and Dallas (as cult serial).
- Best telenovela: The bold and the beautiful.
- Best quiz: Luna Park.
- Best variety: Carramba che sorpresa.
- Best talk show: Amici di sera.
- Best Music show: Roxy bar.
- Best magazine: Il fatto (daily) and Target (weekly).
- Best sport magazine: Mai dire Gol.
- Best show for children: Solletico.
- Lifetime achievement awards: Tony Curtis and Mike Bongiorno.
- Special awards: Forum (for the service TV), Campioni di Ballo and Miss Italia, Mrs. Susanna Bastianini (reader of Sorrisi e Canzoni), Joe Pesci (for the cinema in TV), and Mauro Marino (for the radio).

== Debuts ==
=== RAI ===
==== Serials ====
- Il maresciallo Rocca ("Marshall Rocca") – from Laura Toscano's novels, directed by Giorgio Capitani and others, with Gigi Proietti, Stefania Sandrelli, Veronica Pivetti and Sergio Fiorentini; five seasons and a prequel (The childhood friend). It is the most popular Italian serial of the 1990s; the investigations and the family troubles of the protagonist (a Carabiniers Marshall in Viterbo, widow and with three sons) fascinate the public for a decade.
- Un posto al sole ("A place in the sun") – italian version of the Australian Neighbours, realized by the Naples RAI production Center and again on air. It is the most popular and longest living Italian soap-opera (26 seasons and around 6000 episodes, till now), the plot, set in an imaginary Naples apartment building (Palazzo Palladini) is characterized by the wide space given to the social themes.

==== Variety ====
- Ci vediamo in TV ("See us in TV") – show about vintage music, hosted by Paolo Limiti; 7 seasons.

==== News and educational ====
- Elisir – magazine about medicine, hosted by Michele Mirabella; again on air.
- Porta a porta ("Door to door") – talk show hosted by Bruno Vespa; again on air. It's the most followed and influential political program of Italian television; Giulio Andreotti called it "the third House of Italian parliament". However, it had been also hardly criticized, for its tones, often too sensationalistic or parlor, and for the evident Vespa's partiality in favor of Silvio Berlucsconi.

=== Fininvest-Mediaset ===
==== Serials ====
- Caro maestro ("Dear teacher") – by Rossella Izzo, with Marco Columbro as a bus driver become teacher in an elementary school and Elena Sofia Ricci; 2 seasons.
- Dio vede e provvede ("God sees and provides") by Enrico Oldoini, spin-off of the two homonym comic TV-movies; 2 seasons. Angela Finocchiaro plays the double role of a prostituted turned in nun and of her scheming twin sister.

==== Variety ====
- Uomini e donne ("Men and women") – reality show hosted by Maria De Filippi; again on air. It begins as a talk-show, with couples talking about their troubles; since 2001, becomes a dating show with a boy or a girl sitting on a throne (the "thronist") who chooses a partner among a crowd of pretenders; there is also a version with aged protagonists (Throne over). The show, considered by critics a typical example of "trash television", gets the same a durable public success; the format has been exported in Spain and Albany.
- Zelig (originally, Facciamo cabaret) – comic show aired from the homonymous cabaret in Milan; again on air. In the years, it has changed more times the title (Zelig circus, Zelig Event, Zelig off) and the hosts (Claudio Bisio, Michelle Hunziker and Vanessa Incontrada were the most active.)
- Paperissima sprint – summer version of Paperissima, hosted by Gabibbo; again on air.
- Tira e molla ("Push and pull") – quiz of the early evening; 4 seasons. Thanks to the histrionics of the host Paolo Bonolis, the show gets a great public success, but has a noticeable drop in ratings when the conduction passes to Giampiero Ingrassia (son of Ciccio).
- Chi mi ha visto? ("Who has seen me?") - celebrative show for the 15 years of the Fininvest televisions, hosted by Emanuela Foliero; 2 seasons.
- Galà della pubblicita ("Publicity gala") – award for the best television advertisement; 6 editions.
- Il grande bluff ("The big bluff") – candid camera, hosted by Luca Barbareschi and later by Marco Columbro, from a French format; 3 seasons. Barbareschi and, later, other TV stars, intervene disguised to disturb the Mediaset shows.
- Sotto a chi tocca ("Who's next?") – talent show among teams representing the Italian regions, hosted by Pippo Franco and Pamela Prati; 2 seasons.
- Campioni di ballo ("Dance champions") – talent show about social dance; 4 seasons.
- Vinca il migliore ("May the best win") – quiz hosted by Gerry Scotti, italian version of Everybody's 'equal; 2 seasons.

==== News and educational ====
- La domenica del villaggio ("The sunday of the village") – travel show about the italian villages and the traditional cuisine, hosted by Davide Mengacci and various female partners; 9 seasons.
- Moby Dick – political talk show, hosted by Michele Santoro; 3 seasons. Only program realized by Santoro for Mediaset, it doesn’t repeat the success of the ones for RAI, also if the journalist serves his independence and his populist formula.

However, in this year the Mediaset information bets moreover on the gossip magazines

- Verissimo ("Very true") – hosted by Cristina Parodi, Silvia Toffanin and many others, again on air. Born as a chronicle magazine, with the years it has focused more and more on gossip.
- Chi c'è... c'è – gossip and fashion magazine, hosted by Silvana Giacobini; 4 seasons.
- Papi quotidiani ("Daily Papi") – column of gossip, hosted by Enrico Papi; 2 seasons.

==== For children ====
- Game boat – block programming of cartoons and anime, hosted by Pietro Ubaldi; 3 seasons.

=== Other channels ===
- Zap-Zap (TMC) – block programming of cartoons and anime, with various hosts; 5 seasons.
- Cartoon network (TMC 2) – block programming of cartoons, hosted by Emanuela Panatta; 2 seasons.
- Musica insieme (7 Gold) – dance music show, hosted by Carlo Crocco; again on air in the Piedmonts channel Telecity.
- Telegaribaldi (on Naples television Canale 9; 7 seasons) and Seven show (on 7 Gold; 4 seasons); cabaret shows. They launch some comic actors who later have a career on national scope, as Alessandro Siani (Telegaribaldi), Enrico Bertolino and I Fichi d'India (Seven show).

== Shows of the year ==
=== RAI ===
==== Drama ====
- Samson and Delilah – by Nicoals Roeg, with Eric Thal (Samson) and Elizabeth Hurley (Delilah); sixth chapter of the Lux Vide Bible project.
- I grandi processi ("The great trials") – cycle of docudramas, care of Sandro Curzi, about the most sensational Italian crime stories.
- Ci vediamo in tribunale ("Meet us in the tribunal") – romantic comedy by Domenico Saverni, with Tullio Solenghi and Nancy Brilli. Two lawyers are both lovers and rivals in a divorce proceeding.
- Infiltrato – by Claudio Sestrieri, with Valerio Mastrandrea and Barbora Bobulova. A former convict, police informer, tries to redeem himself saving a woman addict.
- La tenda nera ("The black curtain") – by Luciano Manuzzi, from a Carlo Lucarelli’s tale, with Luca Barbareschi. A carabiners marshal enquiries about a satanic sect.
- Morte di una strega ("Death of a witch") – by Cinzia Th Torrini, from a Laura Toscano's novel, with Remo Girone and Eleonora Giorgi; 2 episodes. The murder of a fortune teller reveals the secrets of a Roman condominium.

==== Miniseries ====
- Nostromo – by Alastair Reid, international coproduction from the Joseph Conrad’s novel, with Claudio Amendola, Colin Firth, Albert Finney and Claudia Cardinale; 3 episodes.
- Positano – by Vittorio Sindoni, with Amanda Sandrelli, in 4 episodes; coming of age story of a band of teenagers improvised hoteliers.
- Donna – by Gianfranco Giagni, from the radio soap Matilde, with Ottavia Piccolo and Edwige Fenech; 6 episodes. An upper class woman must face the failure of his marriage and the troubles of her sons.

==== Serial ====
- Occhio di falco ("Hawkeye") – by Vittorio De Sisti, with Gene Gnocchi, parodic detective serial vaguely inspired to Giorgio Scerbanenco and suspended for low ratings; 7 episodes.
- Uno di noi ("One of us") – by Fabrizio Costa, with Gioele Dix and Lucrezia Lante della Rovere; 12 episodes. A successful architect leaves his work to take care of the orphanage where is grown.

==== Variety ====
- 40 minuti con Raffaella ("Forty minutes with Raffaella Carrà") – spin-off of Carramba che sorpresa, aired daily.
- Holywood party – by Marcello Cesena, hosted by Maurizio Crozza, with the comic group Broncoviz; variety in 12 episodes, focused on the parody of the cinematographic genres.
- Mille lire al mese ("A thousand liras by month") – hosted by Pippo Baudo and Giancarlo Magalli, variety retracing the story of Italian music and way of life in the Twentieth century.
- Su le mani ("Hands up!") – summer variety, with the couple Carlo Conti and Giorgio Panariello.

==== News and educational ====
- Atlantam tam – sporting talk show, hosted by Fabio Fazio, aired for the Atlanta Olimpic Games.
- Ventesimo secolo ("Twentieth century") – program of popular history, hosted by Gianni Bisiach.

=== Mediaset ===
==== Drama ====
- Favola – romantic comedy by Fabrizio De Angelis, inspired to Roman Holyday, with Ambra Angiolini (debuting as actress). It gets a good public success (6 million and half wieners) despite Angiolini herself, the day of the airing, had called it "a bad movie" and invited the spectators to avoid it.
- Fantaghirò 5, last, and least successful, episode of the Fantaghirò franchise, with Alessandra Martines, Remo Girone and Brigitte Nielsen and Sorellina e il principe del sogno ("Little sister and the prince of dreams") with Veronica Logan, Raz Degan and Christopher Lee – fantasy stories directed by Lamberto Bava, both in 2 episodes.

Mediaset airs even 3 TV movies about an innocent escaping from mafia.

- Una donna in fuga ("An escaping woman") – by Roberto Rocco, with Maria Michela Mari and Gina Lollobrigida; 2 episodes. A young woman, to avoid the mafia's revenge, assumes the identity of a dead girl.
- La signora della citta ("The lady of the town") – by Beppe Cino, from the Silvana Giacobini’s novel, with Barbara Blanc; 2 episodes. Another young woman in the same situation, instead, becomes top model in New York.
- Padre papà ("Father dad") – by Sergio Martino, with Antonio Sabato and Maria Grazia Cucinotta; 2 episodes. Here, the casual witness of a mafia crime is a child, natural son of a priest.

==== Miniseries ====
- The return of Sandokan – by Enzo G. Castellari, with Kabir Bedi, Mandala Taye and Fabio Testi; 6 episodes. Ideated as a sequel to Sergio Sollima's Sandokan, it doesn't repeat its popular success.

==== Serials ====
- Cascina Vianello ("Vianello farm") – spin-off of Casa Vianello; the couple Vianello-Mondaini goes to live in the country.
- Quei due sopra il varano ("Two guys over the varanus") – sitcom written by Antonio Ricci, with Enzo Iachetti and Lello Arena, about the misadventures of an actor and his agent, both not too successful. The title hints to an animals shop under the actor’s apartment.

==== Variety ====
- Il boom – tribute to the years of the Italian boom, hosted by Teo Teocoli and Gene Gnocchi. The show is a flop, also because productions problems (the soubrette Ambra Angiolini is summarily dismissed and substituted by Simona Ventura).
- La febbre del sabato sera ("Saturday night's fever") – one-man show by Fiorello, sided by Maurizio Costanzo.
- I guastafeste ("The buzzkills") – mix of variety and candid-camera, hosted by Luca Barbareschi and later by Massimo Lopez. Barbareschi, notorious right-wing sympathizer, is dismissed at the fourth episode, for having invited the audience to not pay the "tax for Europe", wanted by the Prodi cabinet.
- Rose rosse ("Red roses") – variety with the Bagaglino troupe.
- Telemania – quiz about the story of television, hosted by Mike Bongiorno.
- Tutti in piazza ("All in the square") – variety show from the squares of Italian provincial towns, with Gerry Scotti, Alba Parietti and a debuting Enrico Papi.

=== Other channels ===
==== Drama ====
- Il ragazzo dal kimono d'oro 6 (Odeon TV) – by Fabrizio De Angelis, last sequel to Karate Warrior, produced directly for television.

==== Variety ====
- Retromarsh!!! (TMC) – cabaret show, set in a barrack, and hosted by Gianfranco D'Angelo, that strictly traces the Drive-in formula.
- Strettamente personale ("Strictly personal") (TMC) – dating show, hosted by Marco Balestri, the first in Italy to show a gay looking for a male mate.

== Ending this year ==
- Agenzia matrimoniale
- Cinema insieme
- Cinico TV
- Pazza famiglia
- Perdonami
- I ragazzi del muretto
- Re per una notte
- Tempo reale

== Networks and services ==
=== Launches ===
Network	Type	Launch date	Notes	Source
Cartoon Network	Cable and satellite	31 July		

=== Conversions and rebrandings ===
Old network name	New network name	Type	Conversion Date	Notes	Source

=== Closures ===
Network	Type	Closure date	Notes	Source

== Deaths ==
- 12 February: Andrea Barbato, journalist, 61.
- 18 June: Gino Bramieri, comic actor, 67
- 19 December: Marcello Mastroianni, actor, 72
