= Chum Ehelepola =

Australian actor and filmmaker

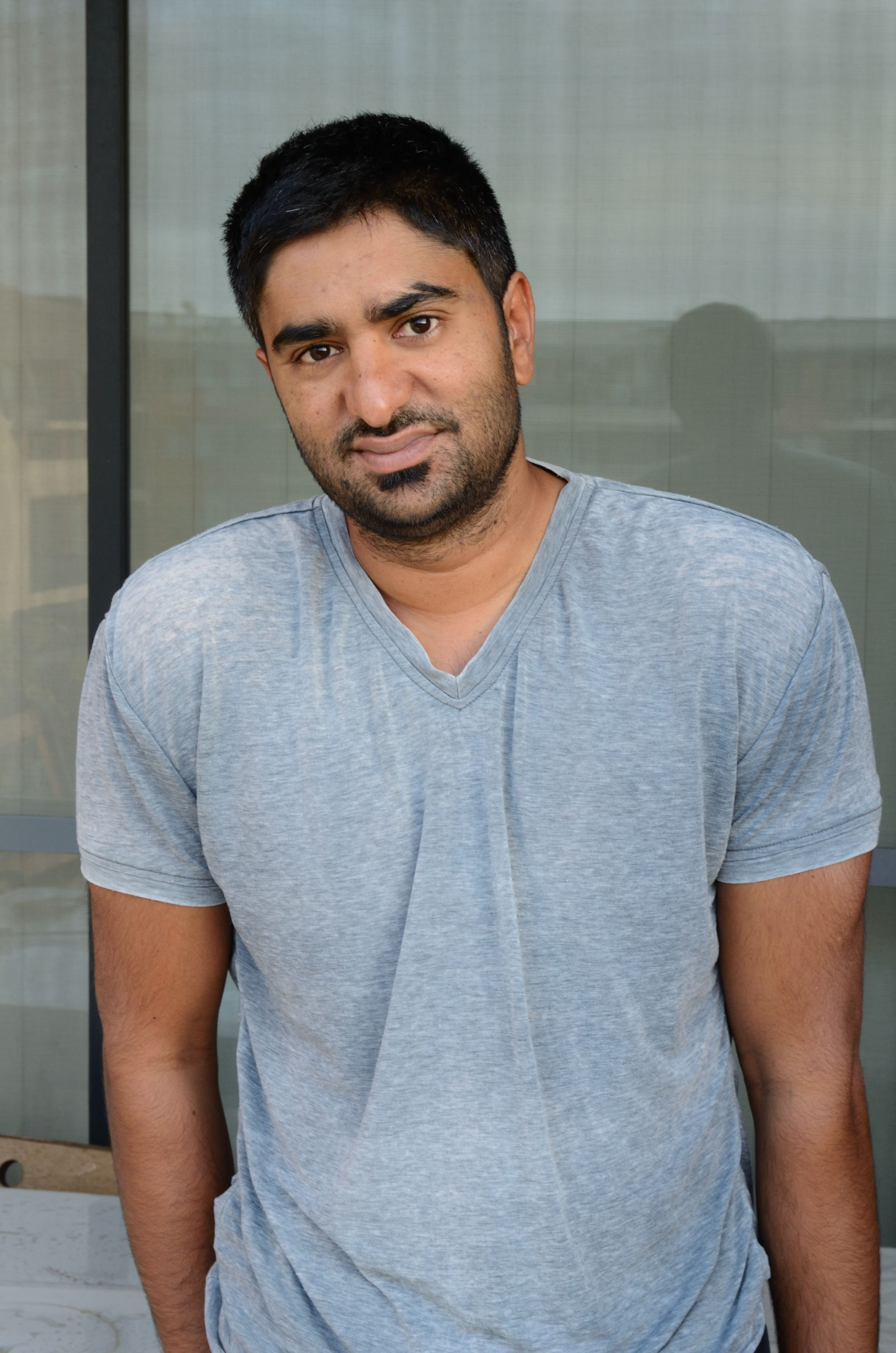
- Chum Ehelepola in 2012
- Born: New Zealand
- Occupation: Actor
- Notable work: The Newsreader

Chum Ehelepola is an Australian actor, filmmaker, and teacher. Ehelepola has recently starred as Dennis in the ABC TV series, The Newsreader, and is also cast as Jagadish in the streaming series Nautilus.

== Early life ==
Ehelepola was born in New Zealand and raised in both Sri Lanka and Australia. Ehelepola attended Hampton Senior High School in the Perth suburb of Morley, Western Australia.

== Career ==
Ehelepola has also starred in a number of Australian TV series, including No Activity, Stateless, The Straits, and as Lionel in the Australian comedy series Preppers.

Due to greater opportunities for actors from diverse backgrounds, Ehelepola relocated to Los Angeles and appeared in a number of US television shows whilst residing there, including the AMC series Lodge 49 and the Netflix series Lady Dynamite. He was also cast in the role of Ramtish in the Disney live action film, Mulan.

== Filmography ==
Television appearances
Year	Title	Role	Notes	Ref
2025	Sunny Nights	Dr Vega	4 episodes	
2024	Nautilus	Jagadish	6 episodes	
2021–2025	The Newsreader	Dennis Tibb	18 episodes	
2023	One Night	Andrew	4 episodes	
2023	We Interrupt This Broadcast	Antiques Roadshow Host	4 episodes	
2021	Preppers	Lionel	6 episodes	
2020	Stateless	Oshan	2 episodes	
2018–19	Lodge 49	Anil	4 episodes	
2017	Lady Dynamite	Dr Ronjon Runningstream	1 episode	
2017	Throwing Shade	Banker 3	1 episode	
2016	No Activity	Steve	3 episodes	
2016	Doctor Doctor	Daniel	1 episode	
2016	Rake	Jeffery	1 episode	
2014	Sequestered	Ramesh	12 episodes	
2014	How to Talk Australians	Mr D'Silva	1 episode	
2014	Courtside	Naveen	6 episodes	
2013	Bones	Mo Khan	1 episode	
2012	The Moodys	Chris	4 episodes	
2012	Redfern Now	Ubit	1 episode	
2012	The Straits	Joseph	5 episodes	
2011	Sea Patrol	Vadara	1 episode	
2011	Laid	Van	1 episode	
2007	Comedy Inc.		1 episode	
2007	All Saints	Chris	1 episode	
2005	The Surgeon	Dr Ravi Jayawardener	8 episodes	

Film appearances
Year	Title	Role	Notes	Ref
2020	Mulan	Ramtish		
2016	Another Time	Tim	Short	
2016	Open House on Beverley	Shuman	Short	
2015	Super Awesome	Shae da Silva		
2012	Intersecting Beauty	Hussain	Short	
2012	Four Season of Love	The Tree	Short	
2012	Status Update: A Facebook Fairytale	Amit	Short	
2009	Traces	Gunn	Short	
2009	Frances and Annie	Ambulance Officer No. 2	Short	
2009	Natural Selection	Nick	Short	
2009	Franswa Sharl	George	Short	
2008	Scary Loney Wolves			
2007	Spider	Gas Station Attendant	Short	
2007	Cross Life	Roman		
2006	Playing with Piranhas	Keith		
2006	Happy Birthday	El	Short	
2005	Don't Say a Word	Mahesh		

== Personal life ==
Ehelepola is a qualified Civil engineer, having attended Curtin University. Ehelepola followed his passion of acting, taking the path of washing dishes, serving coffee and acting classes on the way to building a successful acting career. After residing in Los Angeles for a period of time, Ehelepola returned with his family to Australia and currently resides in New South Wales.

Ehelepola also founded the Sydney Actors Collective, providing acting classes to aspiring Australian acting talent.
