= Fantaghirò 3 =

- German DVD cover
- Written by: Gianni Romoli
- Directed by: Lamberto Bava
- Starring: Alessandra Martines; Ursula Andress; Brigitte Nielsen
- Music by: Amedeo Minghi
- Country of origin: Italy
- Original language: Italian

Production
- Producers: Lamberto Bava; Andrea Piazzesi
- Cinematography: Romano Albani
- Editor: Piero Bozza
- Running time: 200 min (two parts)
- Budget: 6 billion Italian lira

Original release
- Release: 1993

Fantaghirò 3 (also known as The Cave of the Golden Rose 3) is the third film from the Fantaghirò series. It was directed by Lamberto Bava, starring Alessandra Martines as the title character. It originally aired on television in 1993 as a two-parter, and hence is alternately titled as a double-set of Fantaghirò 5 and Fantaghirò 6 in certain releases. Kim Rossi Stuart, who played the hero in the previous two films, returned in this film but his role was much reduced.

In the film, Princess Fantaghirò fights against the handsome but cruel wizard Tarabas (Nicholas Rogers) and his mother, the witch Xellesia (Ursula Andress), to bring back to life the prince Romualdo (Kim Rossi Stuart), turned into a stone statue, and save the child princess Esmeralda. Archenemy of Fantaghirò, the Black Witch (Brigitte Nielsen), also returns but this time as an unwilling helper of the princess.

== Plot ==
=== Part 1 ===
The evil wizard Tarabas has learned of a prophecy that a royal child no older than ten is destined to destroy his kingdom. Shocked to learn that he is not invincible, Tarabas sends his clay soldiers out to kidnap all the royal children of the world. His mother, Xellesia, disapproves of this, but Tarabas is obsessed with learning how he will be defeated. Among the children he targets are the babies of Catherine and Caroline, Fantaghirò's sisters.

Fantaghirò and Romualdo protect the babies from Tarabas's clay soldiers but, during the battle, Romualdo accidentally falls into a cursed river and turns into a statue. Fantaghirò seeks the help of the Elf Queen to cure Romualdo, but she is told that only "The Impossible Kiss" by Tarabas can cure Romualdo. Fantaghirò decides to track down Tarabas by following his clay soldiers. When she comes across the clay soldiers attacking another castle, she intervenes. However, she is too late to save the King who, with his dying breath, asks Fantaghirò to take care of his daughter, Princess Esmeralda. Fantaghirò agrees and takes Esmeralda away to safety.

Tarabas, who has learned about Fantaghirò's quest, deliberately crosses paths with Fantaghirò and Esmeralda as they are travelling in the forest. He claims to be a common traveller, and they agree to camp together for the night for safety. Although Esmeralda is suspicious, Fantaghirò does not suspect anything. As they sleep, Tarabas is overcome with the desire to kiss Fantaghirò, but as soon as he approaches her, he starts to transform into a hideous beast. Tarabas runs away from the camp, and as soon as he does, the transformation ceases and he returns to his human form. He is confronted by Xellesia, who explains that the dark magic within him does not allow him to fall in love, for as soon as he tries to kiss the one he desires, he will be transformed into a beast to devour them.

=== Part 2 ===
Fantaghirò and Esmeralda continue on their journey and are reunited with Lightning and Bolt who have a new plan to track down Tarabas. They decide to resurrect the evil Black Witch, who was destroyed in the previous adventure, and hold her heart hostage, promising to give her back her heart if she helps them find Tarabas. The witch reluctantly agrees and leads them to Tarabas' underground lair. There, Fantaghirò is shocked to learn that the man she befriended in the forest is the feared Tarabas. Tarabas agrees to give Fantaghirò the Impossible Kiss if she will marry him. Fantaghirò agrees. Tarabas chains himself up to prevent himself from devouring Fantaghirò and they kiss. The magic of the Impossible Kiss is captured by the Black Witch, who promises to take it back to Romualdo. As Fantaghirò is preparing to marry Tarabas, she is told by Lightning and Bolt that the witch has broken her promise, and the power of the Impossible Kiss is waning.

Tarabas agrees to let Fantaghirò go if she will promise to return him. Fantaghirò promises and chases after the Black Witch, but it is too late. Although Romualdo cannot be restored to life, Fantaghirò keeps her promise and returns to Tarabas. But Tarabas has had a change of heart and lets Fantaghirò go, realising that this is the only way to prove his love for her. A second Impossible Kiss is made when Tarabas kisses Esmeralda, whom he has also grown to care for. This second kiss revives Romualdo, the pair are finally married and they adopt Esmeralda as their daughter.

== Cast ==
- Alessandra Martines as Fantaghirò
- Nicholas Rogers as Tarabas (voice: Francesco Prando)
- Ursula Andress as Xellesia (voice: Angiola Baggi)
- Brigitte Nielsen as the Black Witch (voice: Aurora Cancian)
- Elena D'Ippolito as Esmeralda (voice: Perla Liberatori)
- Kim Rossi Stuart as Romualdo
- Lenka Kubálková as Bolt (voice: Rossella Acerbo)
- Jakub Zdeněk as Lightning (voice: Laura Lenghi)
- Anna Geislerová as the Queen of Elves (voice: Stella Musy)
- Barbora Kodetová as Catherine (voice: Francesca Draghetti)
- Kateřina Brožová as Caroline (voice: Paola Valentini)
- Gianni Giuliano as the Narrator

== Production and release ==
Of all the films in the series, Fantaghirò 3 is the favourite one of both by the director Lamberto Bava and the writer Gianni Romoli, as the story gives more horror vibes. Tarabas' character was born from Romoli being a fan of the comic book series Dylan Dog, where a character of this name appears in one story.

Fantaghirò 3 was filmed over six weeks of Summer 1993 in the former Czechoslovakia. In an unexcepted problem were torrential rains going on almost uninterruptedly for the entire time of the shooting. Some of the film's special effects were created using computer-generated imagery resources similar to these used for Terminator 2: Judgment Day.

Kim Rossi Stuart categorically refused to reprise his role as Romualdo, so his character's scenes in the third and the fourth films were created using old footage, except two short scenes in the third film on which he grudgingly agreed on. Nicholas Rogers in the role of Tarabas also caused problems, as he had declared during his audition that he was able to ride horses but as soon as the shooting began, he could not even mount a horse. It was then soon realized he was also not good at acting; Bava said that for the scene where Rogers has to say "I love you", they had to make three shots and then combine them later. He also injured himself on the set and had to be taken to hospital while still wearing his costume. The Black Witch was originally supposed to be killed off in the second film, but the highly positive feedback from the public convinced Bava to bring her back for more films. The scene of her head being reanimated, as she had been crumbled into many small stones, was created by simply sticking her head from a hole in a coffee table.

The film premiered on Canale 5 during Christmas 1993. It was later dubbed into multiple languages for foreign television broadcasts and released on home video (VHS and DVD) in Italy and in several other countries. Fantaghirò 3 and both of its prequels were recut (reduced and intersected with each other) into a 200-minute compilation film titled La meravigliosa storia di Fantaghirò ("The Wonderful Story of Fantaghirò") in 1995.

== Sequel ==
In the next sequel, after a mysterious black cloud destroys Fantaghirò's castle, she allies herself with Prince Parsel to track the cloud to its origins and stop whoever is casting it. The film featured very few returning characters from the previous films, and most notable is that Kim Rossi Stuart, Romualdo, did not return at all.
