= Skin Trade (film) =

- Theatrical release poster
- Directed by: Ekachai Uekrongtham
- Written by: Dolph Lundgren; Gabriel Dowrick; Steven Elder
- Produced by: Craig Baumgarten; Dolph Lundgren; Mike Selby
- Starring: Dolph Lundgren; Tony Jaa; Michael Jai White; Celina Jade; Peter Weller; Ron Perlman
- Cinematography: Ben Nott
- Edited by: Victor Du Bois
- Music by: Jacob Groth
- Production companies: BMP Productions; SC Films Thailand (Note: SC Films Thailand bears no relation to the UK-based production company SC Films International.); Thor Pictures
- Distributed by: Hyde Park International; Magnet Releasing; SC Films Thailand
- Release dates: November 7, 2014 (AFM premiere); April 23, 2015 (VOD & Thailand); May 8, 2015 (United States)
- Running time: 95 minutes
- Countries: Thailand; United States
- Languages: English; Thai; Serbian
- Budget: $9 million

Skin Trade is a 2014 American action thriller film directed by Ekachai Uekrongtham. It stars Dolph Lundgren and Tony Jaa, alongside Michael Jai White and Ron Perlman. Lundgren wrote the film with Gabriel Dowrick and Steven Elder, while John Hyams performed uncredited script revisions.

Development started in 2007 after Lundgren read a news report about a group of girls being smuggled into the United States from Mexico. The girls were left in a vehicle along the border and, trapped inside, they all died of heat stroke and suffocation.

Skin Trade had a $9 million production budget, and was shot over 50 days in Canada and Thailand. The film premiered at the American Film Market on November 7, 2014. This was followed by a limited theatrical release, starting on April 9, 2015, in the United Arab Emirates, and succeeded by Thailand (on April 23), Malaysia (on April 30), and the United States (on May 8). The film grossed $384,000 at the worldwide box office.

== Plot ==
Tony Vitayakul, a RTP detective in Thailand, subdues a group of human traffickers in pretext of "buying" a Thai girl. Tony collects information about the ship used to transport trafficked girls and its destination, where he learns that Viktor Dragovic, a Serbian mobster, will be there to receive the shipment.

Meanwhile, Nick Cassidy, a NPD detective in Newark, New Jersey, discovers that Dragovic is in New Jersey. Cassidy and his superior officer Captain Costello brief a group of cops on Dragovic, revealing that Dragovic is a major player in human trafficking worldwide. As the ship carrying Dragovic's container approaches the US, Cassidy and his men prepare to intercept it at the dock. When the ship arrives, Dragovic discovers the trafficked women have died during the transport. The ship's captain is held responsible, tortured and shot in the head. When the police move in, a shootout erupts in which Cassidy fatally shoots Dragovic's youngest son Andre in self-defense and Dragovic gets arrested.

While in custody, Dragovic arranges an attack on Cassidy's family in which Cassidy's wife and daughter Sofia are killed, but Cassidy survives. Costello and Reed, an FBI agent, visits Cassidy in the hospital and tell him that Dragovic has fled the US. After they leave, Cassidy steals clothing and an opiate drug before leaving the hospital. Cassidy gets his guns and goes to the restaurant of Dragovic's attorney. After forcing the attorney to reveal Dragovic's whereabouts, Cassidy shoots him and blows up the restaurant. In Cambodia, Senator Khat warns Dragovic that unless he leaves the country immediately, Dragovic will be arrested and extradited to the US. Dragovic blackmails the Senator into giving him two weeks to put his affairs in order and flee.

Cassidy travels to Thailand in pursuit of Dragovic. Believing that Cassidy has experienced a nervous breakdown, the US authorities have sent Reed to detain him. Vitayakul and his partner Nung are ordered to assist with the arrest. At Suvarnabhumi Airport, Cassidy escapes from the police. Reed, who has been bribed by Dragovic, kills Nung and blames Cassidy for the murder. Vitayakul pursues Cassidy through the streets, but is unable to capture him. Cassidy reaches a nightclub in Poipet. After torturing one of Dragovic's men, Cassidy discovers the location of Dragovic's current operations. Vitayakul and Reed arrive at the nightclub to arrest Cassidy. After fighting with Vitayakul, an injured Cassidy escapes again. Reed uses the timing of a call on Vitayakul's cell phone to discover an informant: Vitayakul's girlfriend Min.

While Cassidy is attempting to locate Dragovic's illegitimate son Janko, who oversees Dragovic's human trafficking business in Southeast Asia, a shootout erupts between Cassidy and Janko's men. Janko flees the warehouse, but he is killed by his half-brothers Ivan and Goran Dragovic. Vitayakul learns the truth about his partner's death, where he kills Reed instead. Janko reveals his father's location before dying. The next day, Cassidy and Vitayakul team up and storm Dragovic's compound. Ivan is holding Min at gunpoint, but Vitayakul shoots him. Cassidy destroys a vehicle with a rocket launcher. As a result, Dragovic's helicopter leaves without him. During a shootout between the two detectives and Dragovic's men, Goran is killed in a fight with Vitayakul. After that, Cassidy fights with Dragovic, ultimately stabbing him in the chest, despite Dragovic commandeering a second helicopter. Dragovic tells Cassidy that Sofia is alive and was sold into the human trafficking trade. Dragovic dies from his injuries, while Cassidy gets distraught about not learning Sofia's whereabouts.

In the aftermath, Cassidy bids farewell to Vitayakul and Min, where he gives them a picture of Sofia and asks them to keep it until he finds Sofia. Cassidy sets out in search Sofia on his own.

== Cast ==
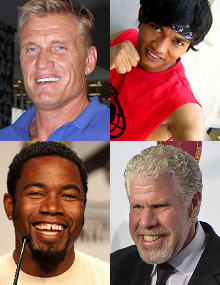
Clockwise: Dolph Lundgren, Tony Jaa, Ron Perlman, and Michael Jai White.

- Dolph Lundgren as Detective Nick Cassidy, a New Jersey police detective seeking to avenge the murder of his family
- Tony Jaa as Detective Tony Vitayakul, a Thailand police detective tasked with arresting Cassidy
- Michael Jai White as Agent Reed, a corrupt FBI agent working for Dragovic
- Ron Perlman as Viktor Dragović, a Serbian war criminal also a mobster running an international human trafficking ring
- Mike Dopud as Goran Dragovic, Viktor's eldest son, who oversees his father's operations in the Middle-East
- David Westerman as Ivan Dragovic, Viktor's other son, who oversees his father's operations in South-East Asia
- Leo Rano as Janko Dragovic, Viktor's son from another relationship, who manages a chain of nightclubs in Thailand
- Michael G. Selby as Andre Dragovic, Viktor's youngest son
- Celina Jade as Min, Tony's girlfriend
- Peter Weller as Captain Costello, the captain of Cassidy's police department in Newark, New Jersey
- Tasya Teles as Rosa Cassidy, Nick's wife
- Chloe Babcook as Sofia Cassidy, Nick's teenage daughter

The film also stars Cary-Hiroyuki Tagawa as Khat, a member of the Cambodian Senate; Maethi Thapthimthong as Nung, Vitayakul's partner on the Thai police force; and Bryce Hodgson as Dex, a petty criminal from New Jersey. The film's co-writer, Steven Elder, appears in a minor role as Dragovic's attorney.

== Production ==
=== Development and writing ===
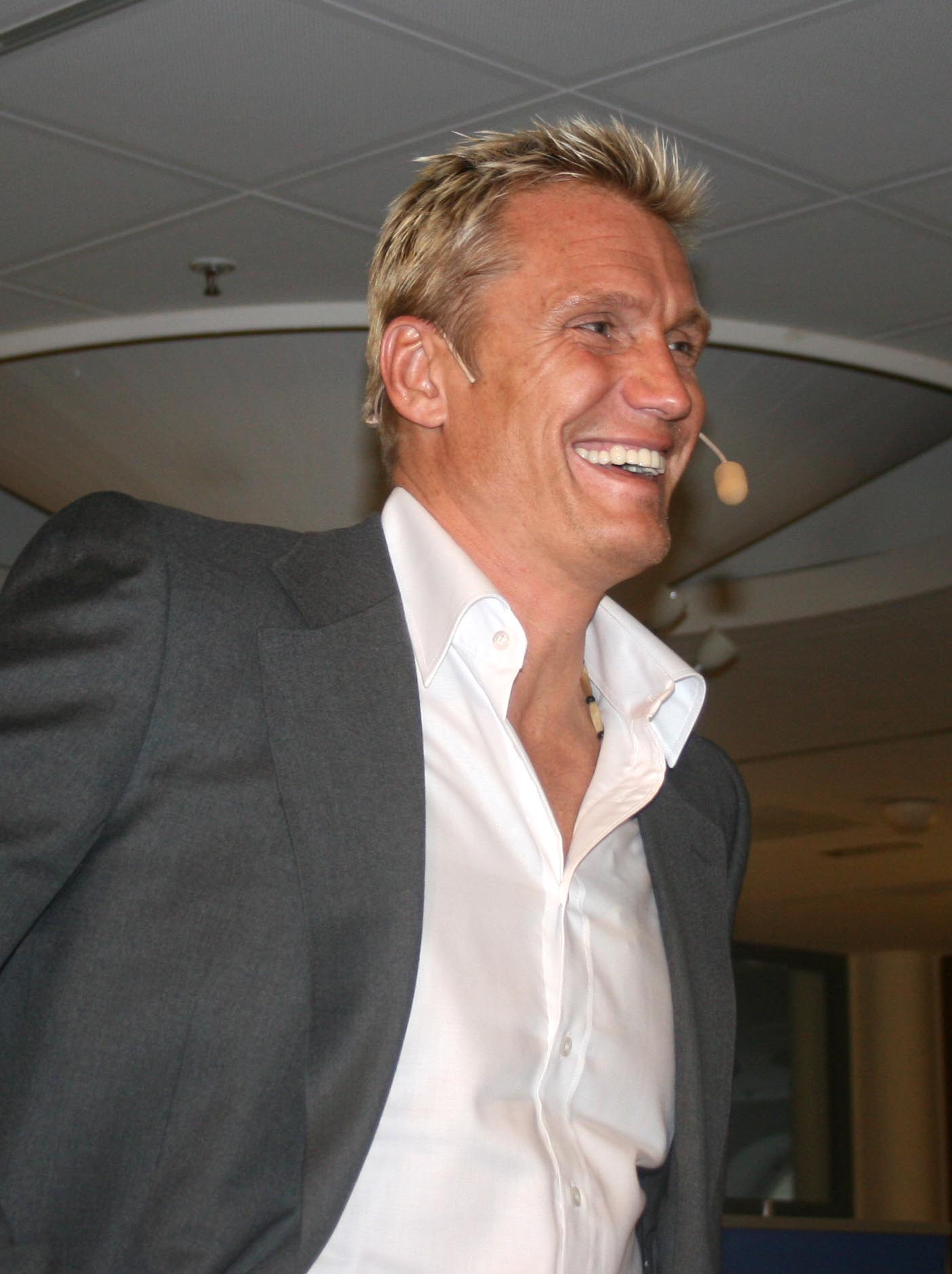
Lundgren in 2007, the year he devised Skin Trade.

Lundgren started researching human trafficking in 2005. He claimed there were "20 million slaves in the world", and that human trafficking was a "$20 billion industry"; the world's "second largest" illegal trafficking enterprise (as of 2015). He started developing Skin Trade in 2007, after reading a news report about a group of girls being smuggled into the United States from Mexico. The girls were left in a vehicle along the border; trapped inside and with no means of escape, they all died of heat stroke and suffocation. Lundgren, who had two young daughters at the time, felt the story of human trafficking "had to be told". He empathized with the victims, saying: "these people are physically humiliated [and] psychologically abused to have no self worth, sort of like [how] I used to feel".

Lundgren wrote the screenplay with Gabriel Dowrick and Steven Elder, while John Hyams performed uncredited script revisions, seven in total, frequently regarding the setting as Lundgren sought financing. The original script was set in Russia. Lundgren even went as far as to personally scout for locations and actors, and to seek financing in Moscow, but it "didn't work out". He changed the setting to Southeast Asia after meeting "someone" interested in financing the film.

=== Casting ===
Originally, Lundgren planned on playing a supporting role, with a more famous actor in the lead. He also considered directing the film, but decided against it, as he desired to learn more about producing. In 2013, Lundgren announced the casting of Tony Jaa, in the role of Tony Vitayakul; and Ekachai Uekrongtham as the director. Lundgren chose Uekrongtham after being impressed with his film, Beautiful Boxer. He contacted him through a mutual friend in Los Angeles, and in mid-2013, they arranged to meet in the city. While he had previously turned down scripts offered to him for international markets, Uekrongtham found Skin Trade "riveting". He said the script "[had] the potential to work as a character-driven piece while saying something about how we deal with scars, literal and otherwise". Jaa, on the other hand, met with Lundgren through his manager and film agent. He couldn't speak any English when cast, but claimed to have taken "intensive" lessons in preparation for his role; stating he is now "reasonably fluent" in "conversational" English.

Tasya Teles was cast as Rosa Cassidy on Christmas Day, 2013. She was heading to Thailand for a holiday "after a year of hard work", and her agent phoned to tell her about the "perfect role"; even insisting on her having a "quick look" at the script. Once Teles realized Skin Trade was about human trafficking, she was "instantly hooked".

On February 7, 2014, SC Films announced the casting of Michael Jai White, Ron Perlman, Peter Weller, Celina Jade, and Cary-Hiroyuki Tagawa. The film's co-producer, Craig Baumgarten, was White's and Weller's manager; he secured them both roles in the film. Weller was the original choice to play Viktor Dragovic, but due to scheduling issues, the role went to Perlman instead. Furthermore, Lundgren considered having White to co-star; White only accepted the role of FBI agent Reed after finding the script "appealing".

=== Filming ===
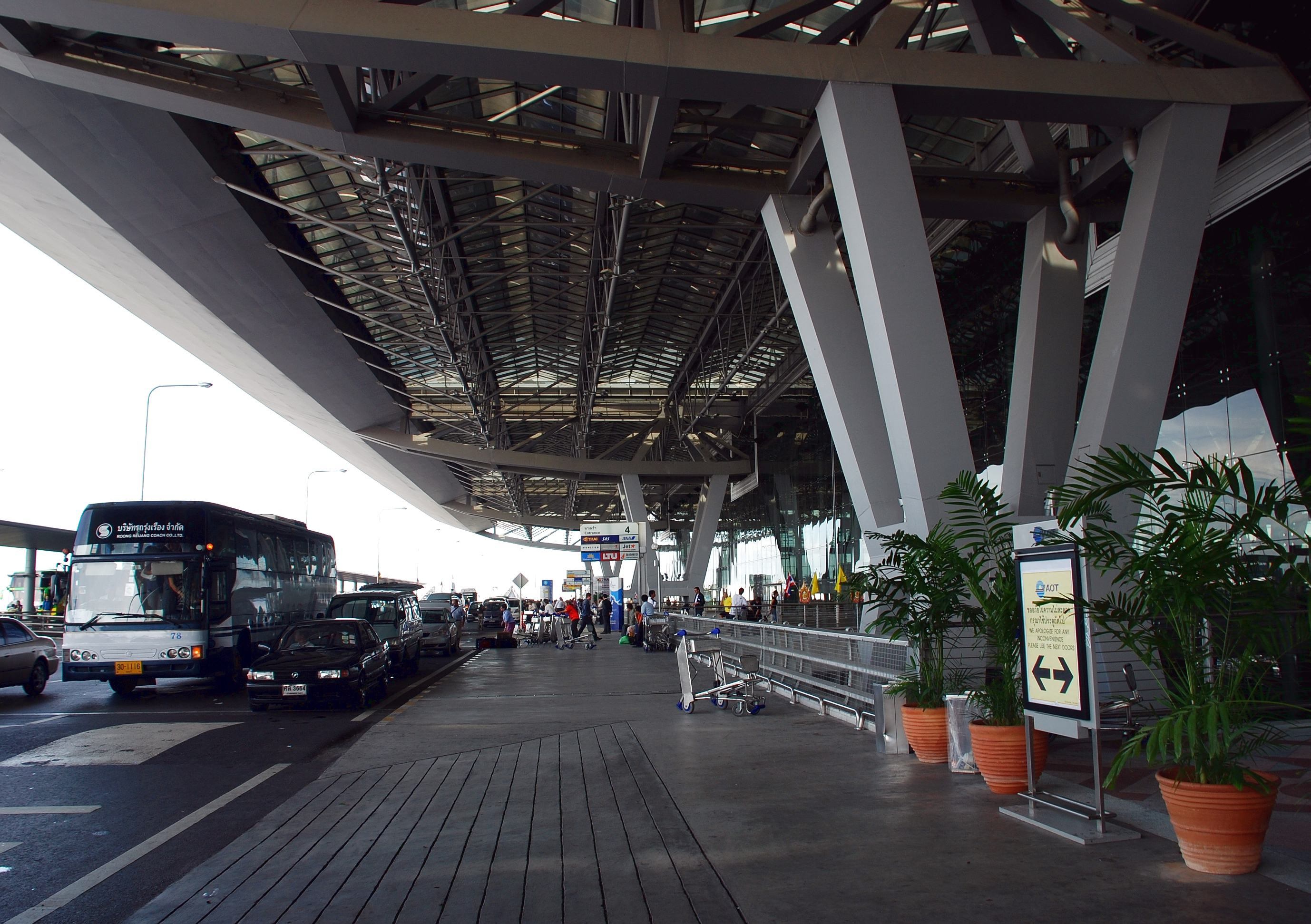
Suvarnabhumi Airport, pictured here in 2007.

Filming began on February 2, 2014, in Thailand. Skin Trade was shot over 50 days: 43 filming in Thailand, and four filming in Vancouver, British Columbia, Canada. In Thailand, filming locations included: Suvarnabhumi Airport, the Min Buri District, the Siam Kempinski Hotel, a rice mill, a leather-bleaching factory, and a century-old mansion. Filming was briefly disrupted by public protests relating to the Thai political crisis. To avoid any further interference, the cast and crew had to travel early to get through the traffic and to the set on time. Most of the film was shot on location, but some scenes were filmed at Baanrig Studios. Skin Trade was the first film to be shot in English by an organization based in Asia (outside of Hong Kong) for an international theatrical release.

Uekrongtham arranged "a few lunches and dinners" between Lundgren and his on-screen family (Tasya Teles and Chloe Babcook), so they could bond "on a personal level" before filming scenes together. Babcook spent a week and a half filming her scenes in Bangkok, followed by a few days of filming in Vancouver.

The "heavily choreographed" fight scene between Lundgren and Jaa was planned over "a month or two". It was rehearsed for two weeks and took a further week to film. Due to Lundgren's role as co-producer, the cast had a lot of freedom to improvise their scenes. Jaa filmed his fight scenes without using wirework or CGI. He felt this would give his character "more depth" and allow him to better display his acting abilities. Jaa also performed all of his own stunts. Lundgren stated he was "very impressed" by Jaa's acting and fighting abilities. In his opinion, the majority of people wouldn't be able to perform Jaa's stunts without using wirework.

"In a less sophisticated movie they'll just fight forever, on this rooftop, that rooftop, the street, on the bus - I mean, it's okay to do that in a comedy. But in a real fight? That's why the Rocky movies are great: there's a story within the fights. Who wins, who's on top at the beginning, and then this changes, and then that one gets injured and the other one takes over; there's a beginning, middle, and an end to every fight. That's what you need. You need to figure that out before you throw the moves in there."

— Lundgren discussing the choreography in 2015.

According to White, his fight scenes with Jaa were in "large part" choreographed ten minutes before filming. On the contrary, Jaa described it as something they were practicing "right up until the shoot". He recalled that while they were rehearsing the sequences and moves together "quite extensively" for a "number of days", they didn't rehearse them on the film set. The fight was filmed in three takes.

=== Effects ===
Explosions were shot at Baanrig Studios, by the special effects team that had worked on The Expendables.

=== Post-production ===
According to Lundgren, the fact that "a lot of" editors worked on the film resulted in him not having "all the control [he] wanted" over the final product. As co-producer of the film, Lundgren had assumed he would have been more involved in the editing process.

== Music ==
=== Soundtrack ===
Skin Trade: Original Motion Picture Soundtrack

Film score (Digital audio) by Jacob Groth
- Released: May 26, 2015
- Genre: Soundtrack
- Length: 34:48
- Label: MovieScore Media

Professional ratings
Review scores
Source	Rating
Soundtrack Geek	9.3/10 stars
Soundtrack Mania	2/5 stars

All of the music was written and composed by Jacob Groth. The song "Unzip Me" by Belle Rev was played in the film, but not included in the soundtrack.

Skin Trade: Original Motion Picture Soundtrack
No.	Title	Length
1.	"Nick Is Framed"	4:21
2.	"Girl in a Cage"	3:35
3.	"Nick's Revenge"	3:34
4.	"Before Disaster"	2:52
5.	"Tony's Investigation"	1:52
6.	"We Are Human"	2:07
7.	"The Harbour"	5:22
8.	"She's Alive"	2:29
9.	"Fighting"	3:34
10.	"Theme for Min"	2:16
11.	"The Big Battle"	4:46
Total length:		34:48

== Release ==
Second from left to right: Celina Jade, Tony Jaa, and Ekachai Uekrongtham at the Thailand Gala Premiere, July 23, 2015.

=== Theatrical ===
The worldwide premiere was held at California's American Film Market on November 7, 2014, while the Thailand premiere was held in Bangkok at the Siam Paragon on April 23, 2015. This was followed by theatrical releases in the United Arab Emirates (on April 9, 2015), Malaysia (on April 30), and the United States (on May 8).

On May 21, 2015, the film was screened at a fundraising event for CAST (The Coalition to Abolish Slavery & Trafficking), a charitable organization based in Los Angeles that helps to rescue and reintegrate victims of human trafficking back into society. Lundgren, who was looking for ways to "help out", started volunteering for CAST during the film's development stage.

=== Marketing ===
A teaser poster was released in 2013, followed by a teaser trailer on March 26, 2014. On April 7 of the same year, Lundgren promoted Skin Trade on CNN. He appeared live in the studio and discussed the film with news anchor Richard Quest. At the 2014 Cannes Film Festival, Hyde Park International presented potential buyers with nine minutes of footage. Magnolia Pictures acquired the U.S. distribution rights on February 20, 2015, and announced they were releasing the film through their subsidiary label, Magnet Releasing. The film's official trailer was released on March 12, 2015.

=== Home media ===
Skin Trade was released through Video-on-Demand on April 23, 2015. On August 25, Magnet Releasing distributed the film on Blu-ray and DVD. In the United States, the film was given an R rating by the Motion Picture Association of America, while in the United Kingdom, it was issued a 15 rating by the British Board of Film Classification. As of April 21, 2017, Skin Trade has grossed $1.94 million in domestic home video sales.

== Reception ==
=== Box office ===
The film debuted in the United Arab Emirates on April 9, 2015. It peaked in fifth place at the box office, and made $79,286 from 19 screenings ($4,173 per theater). No information is available for the film's Thailand debut, but it peaked in fifth place during the second week, and grossed $137,643 from 40 screenings ($3,441 per theater). By the end of the third week, the film dropped to eleventh place at the Thai box office, making a further $3,686 (bringing the entire gross to $141,329 in Thailand). For its debut in Malaysia, Skin Trade came in sixth place, and made $98,559 from 42 screenings ($3,861 per theater). By the end of the second week, it dropped two places at the box office, making a further $32,917 from 39 screenings (bringing the entire gross to $162,163 in Malaysia). Skin Trade grossed a total of $382,784 at the foreign box office.

The film debuted in the United States on May 8, 2015, making $162 (from one theater showing) during its opening weekend. It remained in the one theater for a second week, grossing a further $510. By the end of its third and final week of release in the US, Skin Trade grossed a total of $1,242 at the domestic box office, bringing the film's entire theatrical gross to $384,026.

Theatrical release date(s)	Budget	Box office revenue		
Theatrical release date(s)	Budget	United States (domestic)	Other markets	Worldwide
April 9, 2015 (United Arab Emirates); April 23, 2015 (Thailand); April 30, 2015 (Malaysia); May 8, 2015 (United States)	$9 million	$1,242	$382,784	$384,026

=== Critical response ===
Rotten Tomatoes reports that 25 percent of critics gave a positive review, the "average" rating being 4.8/10. On Metacritic, the film has a score of 39 out of 100, also indicating "generally unfavorable" reviews.

Tony Jaa speaking English in Skin Trade
Many critics felt Jaa lacked fluency in English.

Martin Tsai of LA Times wrote "If bare-knuckle fights are what you seek, director Ekachai Uekrongtham certainly delivers, but the film scarcely scratches the surface of the horrors of human trafficking." Nick Schager of Variety wrote "Dolph Lundgren and Tony Jaa star in this tedious, formulaic actioner." Ignatiy Vishnevetsky of A.V. Club praised the action sequences, but criticized it as a formulaic actioner.

"Offering literally nothing original, Skin Trade is just a bargain bin action vehicle for an aging star."

— Adam DiLeo, of IGN Movies (2015).

Chuck Bowen of Slant Magazine heavily criticized the film and wrote "There’s no beauty to this film, little rhythm, none of the physical grace that action-film fans crave even if they don’t know they do." Frank Scheck of The Hollywood Reporter wrote "The screenplay is far more complicated than it needed to be, featuring enough plot twists and character reversals to fuel a dozen thrillers, but it hardly matters, since the film’s main impetus is to provide a nonstop series of action sequences featuring its formidable leads."

Scott Tobias of The Dissolve gave 2.5/5 stars and wrote "Skin Trade is a throwback to the one-man-army actioners of the ’80s, sprinkled with updated stats on human trafficking. If the film happens to raise awareness, then that’s more bonus than objective." Simon Abrams of Rogerebert gave 3/5 stars and wrote "Skin Trade is best enjoyed if you take its most blissfully absurd qualities in stride with its most appreciably well-crafted assets [action sequences]." Eoin Friel of The Action Elite gave 4/5 stars and wrote "Skin Trade isn’t the most original movie ever but it was massively entertaining with some spectacular action and a stellar cast that is a must-see for action fans."

== Potential sequel ==
Teles said she would be open to returning for a sequel; she feels the film was "set [...] up very nicely for" one, and claims "[e]verybody's wondering" if there will be a follow-up. On the possibility of a sequel, Lundgren said: "I didn't consider [Skin Trade] as a franchise, but when I was over there [in Thailand], I started thinking, 'How would I do this different? How would I stay close to the subject matter?' Organ trafficking is quite big as well, so I thought that could be interesting. We could follow up with some kind of other trade."
