= Preppers (TV series) =

Australian TV series

- Genre: Comedy
- Created by: Nakkiah Lui; Gabriel Dowrick
- Written by: Nakkiah Lui; Gabriel Dowrick
- Directed by: Steven McGregor
- Country of origin: Australia
- Original language: English
- No. of series: 1
- No. of episodes: 6

Production
- Executive producers: Liz Watts; Sally Riley; Margaret Ross; Jo Bell
- Producer: Sylvia Warmer
- Running time: 30 minutes
- Production companies: Porchlight Films; Spirit Pictures

Original release
- Network: ABC
- Release: 10 November 2021

Preppers is a 2021 Australian television comedy series that aired on ABC Television.

== Plot ==
Preppers follows Charlie, a young Aboriginal woman who encounters a community of preppers at a place they call "Eden 2".

== Cast ==
- Nakkiah Lui as Charlie
- Ursula Yovich as Kelly
- Chum Ehelepola as Lionel
- Meyne Wyatt as Guy
- Aaron McGrath as Jayden
- Eryn Jean Norvill as Kirby
- Jack Charles as Monty
- Grant Denyer as Thomas
- Christine Anu as Marie
- Miranda Tapsell as Young Nan
- Joseph Althouse as Young Monty
- Brooke Satchwell as Sophie
- Luke Carroll as Quincy
- Luke Arnold as Fig
- Tony Briggs as Kevin
- Shareena Clanton as Treena
- Annie Maynard as Gwynn
- Kate Miller-Heidke as herself
- Leeanna Walsman as Clementine
- Toby Schmitz as Brody

== Production ==
The six-part series is created and written by Nakkiah Lui and Gabriel Dowrick and directed by Steven McGregor.

== Episodes ==
=== Series 1 (2021) ===
No. overall	No. in series	Title	Directed by	Written by	Original release date
1	1	"Welcome to Eden 2"	Steven McGregor	Nakkiah Lui & Gabriel Dowrick	10 November 2021
A young Aboriginal woman, Charlie, suffers her own personal cataclysmic event and finds herself at the centre of a mismatched community of 'preppers' planning for the apocalypse at Eden 2.
2	2	"The Penrith Panther"	Steven McGregor	Nakkiah Lui & Gabriel Dowrick	17 November 2021
The preppers attempt a First Nations survival exercise, but after they get lost, find themselves being tracked by a mythical creature.
3	3	"Skeletons"	Steven McGregor	Nakkiah Lui & Gabriel Dowrick	24 November 2021
After finding a skeleton buried at Eden 2, the preppers kidnap an Aboriginal archaeologist to determine who the bones belong to.
4	4	"The Bunker"	Steven McGregor	Nakkiah Lui & Gabriel Dowrick	1 December 2021
Charlie accidentally locks the preppers in the Eden 2 bunker and they must decide who should be sacrificed to ensure enough air remains for the group.
5	5	"The First Annual, Semi-Inaugural Eden 2 Blackfulla Royale"	Steven McGregor	Nakkiah Lui & Gabriel Dowrick	8 December 2021
Charlie's mother arrives at Eden 2 to reconnect with her, and a secret mission to take on Monty's claim to the land.
6	6	"Shangri-La 2"	Steven McGregor	Nakkiah Lui & Gabriel Dowrick	15 December 2021
Fig returns to Eden 2 with a treaty to share the prepper's land in exchange for the luxuries of his new white prepping community, Shangri-La.

== Awards ==
Preppers was nominated for Best Narrative Comedy Series and Best Comedy Performer (Nakkiah Lui) at the 2021 AACTA Awards.
