= Ludwig Briand =

French actor (born 1981)

- Born: 9 May 1981 (age 45); Soisy-sous-Montmorency, Val-d'Oise, Île-de-France.
- Years active: 1993–1999

Ludwig Briand (born 9 May 1981 at Soisy-sous-Montmorency) is a French actor. Named after Ludwig van Beethoven, he got his first acting job in 1991 at the age of ten as Gavroche in the stage musical Les Misérables. Then another musical Paul And Virginie as Paul. After his role in the worldwide hit film Un indien dans la ville he returned to the stage as the lead in the musical Petit Arthur.

== Filmography ==
- Un indien dans la ville (1994)... Mimi-Siku
- Fantaghirò 5 (1996)... Masala
