= Les Misérables (1995 film) =

Film by Claude Lelouch

- Theatrical release poster
- Directed by: Claude Lelouch
- Written by: Claude Lelouch
- Based on: Les Misérables by Victor Hugo
- Produced by: Claude Lelouch
- Starring: Jean-Paul Belmondo; Michel Boujenah; Alessandra Martines
- Cinematography: Claude Lelouch; Philippe Pavans de Ceccatty
- Edited by: Hélène de Luze
- Music by: Didier Barbelivien; Erik Berchot; Francis Lai; Michel Legrand; Philippe Servain
- Production companies: Canal + Les Films 13; TF1
- Distributed by: BAC Films
- Release date: 22 March 1995 (France)
- Running time: 175 minutes
- Country: France
- Language: French
- Box office: 1,001,967 admissions (France)

Les Misérables is a 1995 French war film written, produced and directed by Claude Lelouch. Set in France during the first half of the 20th century, the film concerns a poor and illiterate man named Henri Fortin (Jean-Paul Belmondo) who is introduced to Victor Hugo's classic 1862 novel Les Misérables and begins to see parallels to his own life. The film won the 1995 Golden Globe Award for Best Foreign Language Film.

== Plot ==
As the film opens, Henri's father, a chauffeur also named Henri, is falsely accused of having murdered his boss. During his trial and imprisonment, Henri's mother finds a job in a tavern on a Normandy beach. There Henri sees a film adaptation of Les Misérables. His father dies attempting to escape from prison, and upon hearing the news Henri's mother commits suicide. Henri grows up an orphan and learns boxing.

The film next takes up the story of Elisa, a ballerina, and André Ziman, a young Jewish journalist and law student. They meet following a performance of a ballet based on Les Misérables. Later, during World War II, André and Elisa, now married, and their daughter Salomé attempt to cross the Swiss border to escape the Nazis. They encounter Henri, who owns a moving company, and they discuss the Hugo novel. The Zimans entrust Salomé to Henri and enroll her in a Catholic convent school. André and Elisa are ambushed while trying to cross the frontier. Elisa is arrested and André wounded. Farmers who find him give him shelter.

The members of a local gang and Henri join the French Resistance, but the gang members take advantage of their anti-Nazi attacks to steal from local houses. Elisa and other women are forced to entertain the Nazi occupiers. She is sent to a concentration camp for being defiant. After staging an attack on a train transporting funds for the Vichy government, Henri and his mates travel to Normandy to visit the tavern where he lived as a child. The D-Day invasion is launched the next day and Henri supports the Allied forces when they conquer the beach. In the process he saves the life of the tavern owner's son Marius.

At the war's end, Henri accepts an offer to run a seaside camp in Normandy. There he receives a letter from Salomé, who has no way of contacting her family. He takes her with him to the resort, which he names Chez Jean Valjean. Elisa, having survived a Nazi concentration camp in German-occupied Poland, joins them later.

A former Vichy police agent accuses Henri of abetting the gang's activities during the war and of robbing and burning a train. He is imprisoned to await trial. Meanwhile, André's one-time rescuer is holding him captive, hoping to live off his bank account. The farmer has told André that the American D-Day invasion failed and the Nazis now rule the world. With evident reluctance, the farmer's wife supports her husband in these lies until he attempts to poison André. Then she shoots her husband before he can feed André the poisoned soup. As she checks to see if her husband is dead, he grabs her and chokes her to death. André escapes from his cellar prison on a bad leg and emerges to find the farmer couple dead and a liberated Europe. He rejoins his wife and daughter at Chez Jean Valjean and then represents Henri at his trial and wins his acquittal.

As the film ends, Henri, now the mayor, presides at the civil marriage of Salomé and Marius in the presence of André and Elisa and the mother superior of the school that sheltered Salomé. André Ziman quotes Victor Hugo: "The best of our lives is yet to come."

== Cast ==
- Jean-Paul Belmondo as Leopold/Henri Fortin/Henri's father (also named Henri Fortin)
- Michel Boujenah as André Ziman
- Alessandra Martines as Elisa Ziman
- Salomé Lelouch as Salomé Ziman, child
- Margot Abascal as Salomé Ziman, adult
- Annie Girardot as Madame Thénardier
- Philippe Léotard as Thénardier
- Clémentine Célarié as Catherine
- Philippe Khorsand as Policeman
- Ticky Holgado as Nice Street Urchin
- William Leymergie as Toureiffel
- Jean Marais as Msgr. Myriel
- Micheline Presle as Mother Superior
- Sylvie Joly as the Innkeeper
- Daniel Toscan du Plantier as Count de Villeneuve
- Michaël Cohen as Marius
- Jacques Boudet as Doctor
- Isabelle Sadoyan as Madame Magloire
- Robert Hossein as Ceremony Master
- Darry Cowl as Bookseller
- Antoine Duléry as Crazy Street Urchin
- Jacques Gamblin as Church Attendant
- Joseph Malerba as The pumpman
- Pierre Vernier as Prison Director
- Nicolas Vogel as Le général de Verdun

In the film within the film

- Jean-Paul Belmondo as Jean Valjean
- Rufus as Monsieur Thénardier
- Nicole Croisille as Mme. Thénardier
- Clémentine Célarié as Fantine
- Philippe Khorsand as Javert

== Reception ==
The film opened at number one at the French box office with a gross of 8,510,740 Francs ($1.7 million) for the week. The film received positive reviews from critics with a score of 80% on Rotten Tomatoes. Roger Ebert wrote he liked this film's "expansive freedom and (the) energy of its storytelling". The Los Angeles Times called it "a spectacular-looking film" that "eventually becomes needlessly drawn-out", and added: "the cast is staunch...but Belmondo...easily walks away with the picture." Variety said it was the "mightiest of Lelouch’s humanist hymns", and Belmondo "gives one of the finest perfs of his career". Janet Maslin, who reviewed the film for The New York Times, meanwhile complained about "odd variations on Hugo's themes."

== Accolades ==
The film won the 1995 Golden Globe Award for Best Foreign Language Film and Annie Girardot won the 1996 César Award for Best Supporting Actress.

== See also ==
- Adaptations of Les Misérables
