= Gabriel Dowrick =

Australian born screenwriter and editor

- Born: Sydney, Australia
- Occupations: Writer, Editor (Film & TV)
- Years active: 2005–present
- Notable work: Preppers, Skin Trade
- Website: www.gabedowrick.com

Gabriel Dowrick (born 4 September 1983) is an Australian born screenwriter and editor.

== Screenwriting ==
Gabriel co-wrote and created the Australian ABC TV comedy series Preppers with Nakkiah Lui in 2021. Preppers was nominated for Best Narrative Comedy Series and Best Comedy Performer (Nakkiah Lui) at the 2021 Australian Academy of Cinema and Television Arts Awards.

Feature film credits include Skin Trade, directed by Ekachai Uekrongtham and starring Dolph Lundgren and Tony Jaa and Terminus, directed by Marc Furmie and exec-produced by Shane Abbess.

Gabriel has twice been a finalist in the Script Pipeline screenwriting contest, in 2012 and 2016, for scripts co-written with Ben Phelps.

== Editing ==
=== TV ===
Gabriel has worked as an editor on many Australian TV series', including Bali 2002, Preppers, Total Control, Wakefield, Barons, Informer 3838, Black Comedy, Doctor Doctor, Squinters, Kiki and Kitty, The Other Guy, The Family Law, Soul Mates, No Activity, Wham Bam Thank You Ma'am and The Elegant Gentleman's Guide to Knife Fighting.

=== Film ===
Gabriel edited the feature film Terminus and worked on the anthology drama The Turning.

=== Awards ===
Gabriel was nominated for Best Editing in Television at the 2021 Australian Academy of Cinema and Television Arts Awards for his work on Wakefield.

Other awards include "Best Young Talent" at Tropfest in 2005; "Best Action Sequence" at the Action On Film International Film Festival in 2007 with the short movie "The razor's edge" starring Nicholas Rogers; plus nominations for "Best Achievement in Editing" at the 2013 St Kilda Short Film Festival for the short The One Who Broke Your Heart; and an Australian Film Institute / Australian Academy of Cinema and Television Arts (AACTA) nomination for his work on the anthology film The Turning.

Gabriel has been nominated for six Australian Screen Editors awards and won twice, for the ABC TV series Wakefield and for the Stan original series The Other Guy. He was nominated twice for his work on Soul Mates, as well as for The Family Law and Nakkiah Lui's short film Brown Lips.
