= Fantaghirò 5 =

- Written by: Gianni Romoli
- Directed by: Lamberto Bava
- Starring: Alessandra Martines; Remo Girone; Ludwig Briand; Brigitte Nielsen
- Music by: Amedeo Minghi
- Country of origin: Italy
- Original language: Italian
- No. of episodes: 2

Production
- Producers: Lamberto Bava; Andrea Piazzesi
- Cinematography: Romano Albani
- Editor: Mauro Bonanni

Original release
- Network: Canale 5
- Release: November 23 – November 25, 1996

Fantaghirò 5 it is an Italian television miniseries, the fifth belonging to the homonymous romantic fantasy franchise. The miniseries was broadcast for the first time by the Italian TV channel Canale 5 in two parts of 100 minutes each, on 23 and 25 December 1996.

== Plot ==
=== Part one ===
Terrifying events begin to happen in a continent far away from the realm of Fantaghirò. The vegetables and fruits have begun to rebel against people, sowing terror among the incredulous population. The Kingdom is besieged by strange malignant soldiers made of vegetables that kidnap the inhabitants — preferring children — to feed them to Nameless, the dark captain of a Floating Vessel.

The surviving rebels find refuge at the underground hiding place of Asteria, a sorceress who offers them not only asylum but also a possibility of salvation: thanks to a magical talking plant the children who survived the slaughter can summon a hero. Each child must do nothing but pluck one of the leaves, express a desire, and eat it. The boys want a strong, combative, courageous hero, but two of them wish for someone who can also cook.

In the meantime, Fantaghirò is imprisoned by the Black Witch in her realm. Deprived of most of her magical powers due to her previous good deeds, the Black Witch hopes to recover them by killing a selfless and good-hearted person like the young queen. But, just as she is about to sacrifice Fantaghirò, the magical plant recognizes in Fantaghirò all the requirements expressed by the children and the woman escapes once again from certain death, finding herself in the other world.

In the beginning, the children are not very happy, believing that a female hero is not the one they wanted, but over time they discover that Fantaghirò is exactly the one who can cope with the mortal danger that fell into their peaceful land. However, Fantaghirò would like to return to her world, so Asteria applies to a sleeping Fantaghirò some "memoryeech", small magical animals that eat away any feeling related to her home world.

The situation worsens rapidly and is complicated by an invincible warrior made of metal raised by Asteria. The sorceress is in love with him and believes that she can assist the rebels through the warrior. The warrior, however, immediately allies with enemy forces, increasing their fierceness and ruthlessness.

=== Part two ===
Fantaghirò finds an ally in Aries, a wandering knight who has feelings for the young queen. Aries never fails to annoy her with his out-of-place irony. Despite his inconstant and childish personality, the knight is an extremely valid asset for the rebels, as Aries demonstrates an incredible skill at fighting, acquired through years of travel around the world. Thanks to Aries's swordsmanship, Fantaghirò managed to defeat the Iron Warrior, who sinks into a river. When Fantaghirò begins to fall in love with Aries, the man decides to test her love and convince Asteria to give her back her old feelings.

The situation worsens during a fight between Fantaghirò and Nameless, the captain of the vessel. The captain proves to be a sort of automaton built by a magic craftsman with the wood of a bewitched tree, the apalicandro, which is completely indestructible.

Nameless reveals to Fantaghirò that since he came to life, he began to travel through the worlds feeding on human flesh. The more he ate and the more he became human himself. The final struggle between the Captain and Fantaghirò is decidedly unequal, as the woman does not have weapons or magical abilities capable of countering him. It seems that her end is near, but Fantaghirò makes use of the help of a couple of magic woodworms, ravenous devourers of apalicandro wood. The Captain's body is, in fact, still largely woody, therefore the woodworms devour him to his death.

Once the cannibal monster is defeated, peace is restored and Fantaghirò takes part in the celebrations. The girl who originally wished for a heroine goes to Fantaghirò to gift her the magic plant that grants wishes — Fantaghirò can thus go back to her realm. However, the girl sees Fantaghirò and Aries exchange passionate effusions, so she thinks that Fantaghirò is happy to stay there with them and throws away the root, leaving Fantaghirò in the dark about her true life.

== Cast ==
- Alessandra Martines as Fantaghirò
- Remo Girone as Nameless
- Luca Venantini as Aries
- Ludwig Briand as Masala
- Michaela May as Asteria
- Brigitte Nielsen as Black Witch
- Ariadna Caldas as Azela
- Joan Fort as Sarsut
- Casar Luis Gonzales as Gurdalak
- Amarilys Nunez Barrioso as Masala's mom
- Morgane Slemp as Elina

== Reception ==
The last installment of the series is regarded as its lowest point, being "universally hated not only by those who played in it but also by the most avid fans." Its poor reception and low ratings resulted in the cancellation of the planned further sequels.
