= No Activity =

- Genre: Comedy
- Written by: Trent O'Donnell
- Directed by: Trent O'Donnell
- Starring: Patrick Brammall; Darren Gilshenan; Harriet Dyer; Genevieve Morris; Dan Wyllie; David Field; Damon Herriman; Rose Byrne
- Country of origin: Australia
- Original language: English
- No. of seasons: 2
- No. of episodes: 12

Production
- Executive producer: Jason Burrows
- Producer: Chloe Rickard
- Camera setup: Single-camera
- Production company: Jungle Entertainment

Original release
- Network: Stan
- Release: 22 October 2015 – 14 December 2018

No Activity is an Australian comedy television series which debuted on Stan in 2015, about two detectives on a stakeout. The show was the first commission for the Australian streaming service. It comes from the production company Jungle Entertainment, a partnership between Trent O'Donnell, Jason Burrows, Chloe Rickard and Phil Lloyd. It is written and directed by Trent O'Donnell with executive producer Jason Burrows and producer Chloe Rickard.

The first season, consisting of six episodes, premiered in its entirety on 22 October 2015. The second season was released on 26 October 2016.

== Cast ==
=== Main cast ===
- Patrick Brammall as Detective Hendy, an ambitious detective keen to restore his reputation after a disastrous drug bust. He talks a lot.
- Darren Gilshenan as Detective Stokes, a hopeful dreamer whose detective work leaves a lot to be desired.
- Daniel Wyllie as Jimmy, a colorful character who has returned to a life of crime after his failed endeavour in hospitality.
- Harriet Dyer as April, a young police officer on dispatch duty who is waiting for reinstatement into active duty after she tasered a man to death because he did not listen or take her seriously.
- Genevieve Morris as Carol, a straight talking police dispatch officer, who isn't afraid to call you out if you're an arsehole; babies and disabled people included.
- David Field as Bruce, an older career criminal with an unlikely passion for fine art and a talent for the mandolin. His prior attempts at going straight have met with mixed success, but after sensing something isn't right about the kidnapping job, he comes up with an idea for a new venture.
- Damon Herriman as Bernie (season 2), a wealthy businessman who spends most of his money on unsuccessful charity fundraisers hosted by his wife. In a marriage that has been loveless for years, the kidnapping might be the best thing that's ever happened to him.
- Rose Byrne as Elizabeth (season 2), Bernie's wife who hasn't seen him naked in ten years. She enjoys his credit card much more than she does his company. The kidnapping forces her to question how she'd wish to die, with some unexpected results.
- Chum Ehelepola as Steve (season 2), a budding criminal who desperately wants to be Australia's best kidnapper of Sri Lankan descent, even if he's the only one. Learning the ropes as an underworld criminal, he's sure his parents would be proud of what he's accomplished in his first outing in the big leagues.
- Anthony Hayes as Neddy (season 2), a criminal partnered with Steve by the powers that be in the criminal hierarchy. Neddy's been around the traps, seen a lot and done some bad things. Prior to becoming a criminal, he worked as security in a brothel, a job that gave him a lot of hands on experience, and he's not shy of sharing it with his inexperienced partner in crime.

=== Guest cast ===
- Sam Simmons as Glen (season 1), Bruce’s replacement.
- Tim Minchin as Jacob (season 1).
- Kat Stewart as Tanya (season 1).
- Jaxon Graham-Wilson as Lachy, Carol’s son.
- Jake Johnson as Cutler (season 1).
- Kim Gyngell as Rainer (season 2), an older detective who, some say, should have retired 10 years ago. His clear disdain for his new partner Stokes raises his temper to deadly effect.
- Alan Dukes as Lee (season 2 + Christmas special), a disabled police dispatch officer who Carol openly dislikes.
- Susie Youssef as Anousha (season 2), a young, tech- and social media-savvy dispatch officer. A product of modern society, who challenges Carol's more traditional ideas of Muslim culture, she's a keen roller derby aficionado and introduces Carol to the sport.
- Steve Le Marquand as Voice (3 episodes).

== Episodes ==
=== Season 1 (2015) ===
No. overall	No. in season	Title	Directed by	Written by	Original release date
1	1	"The Dolphin"	Trent O'Donnell	Trent O'Donnell	22 October 2015
A large concrete dolphin is in the back of the car on the stakeout, causes Hendy to question Stokes’ professionalism. The cops debate the erotic advantages of Siamese twins. April has her first day in dispatch. In the warehouse Jimmy updates Bruce on the search for his dad.
2	2	"Two Vomits"	Trent O'Donnell	Trent O'Donnell	22 October 2015
An overly eager security guard (guest star Tim Minchin) disrupts the dockside stakeout. April tells Carol the grim tale of why she was taken off the beat. Hendy prepares to make an important call to dispatch (he wants to ask April out). Stokes shoots someone in error.
3	3	"The Date"	Trent O'Donnell	Trent O'Donnell	22 October 2015
Hendy and April have an awkward radio exchange after their date. He thinks it was great, she thinks it was the worst date ever. The crims (including guest star Sam Simmons) lament the lack of imagination in the Aussie crime industry. Carol’s son Lachy is suspended from school in unusual circumstances.
4	4	"The Witness"	Trent O'Donnell	Trent O'Donnell	22 October 2015
What would a high quality TV show of Hendy and Stokes be like? Tanya (guest star Kat Stewart) a witness with the cops, finds out. The crims have a reunion. Carol brings Lachy to work, with awkward consequences for April as he takes pictures of her for personal use.
5	5	"The American"	Trent O'Donnell	Trent O'Donnell	22 October 2015
Hendy’s is starstruck by U.S. detective Cutler (guest star Jake Johnson). Stokes is being interviewed over the shooting but mistakes his interviewer for a counsellor. Hendy goes to collect a takeaway and has an earnest chat about family with one of the crims whilst waiting at the counter.
6	6	"The Coffee Raid"	Trent O'Donnell	Trent O'Donnell	22 October 2015
The cops are bullet-proofed and raid ready, staying alert with good coffee.

=== Season 2 (2016) ===
No. overall	No. in season	Title	Directed by	Written by	Original release date
7	1	"Missing Persons"	Trent O'Donnell	Trent O'Donnell	26 October 2016
Stokes and Hendy receive an emergency call. Meanwhile, wealthy couple Bernie and Elizabeth Doolan have been reported missing from their mansion. Newly single Stokes asks Hendy to help him with a non-hipster profile pic for Tinder.
8	2	"Death of an Eel"	Trent O'Donnell	Trent O'Donnell	26 October 2016
Stokes gets surprised by Hendy and dispatch for his 50th birthday until they realise he’s only 48 so the celebrations are cut short. Later, Stokes and Hendy watch a video of Burrows’ acts with an eel.
9	3	"Silent Night"	Trent O'Donnell	Trent O'Donnell	26 October 2016
Stokes has manicured his pubes and the boys find out there's been a surprise passenger with them all along. April gets a haircut that's very similar to Carol's causing some tension in the dispatch.
10	4	"The Butterfly Tattoo"	Trent O'Donnell	Trent O'Donnell	26 October 2016
Stokes wakes up from a big nap. Carol meets her new dispatch partner, Anousha, who’s Muslim and she tells her she's glad Waleed Aly’s Logie win ended racism in Australia. Jimmy and Bruce discuss losing their art cafe during honesty hour.
11	5	"Noughts and Crosses"	Trent O'Donnell	Trent O'Donnell	26 October 2016
Stokes and Hendy have been separated for Code 4 Misconduct. Stokes has a new partner, Rainer. He calls Hendy, who also has a new partner... April.
12	6	"La Traviata"	Trent O'Donnell	Trent O'Donnell	26 October 2016
Hendy and Stokes are outside the house where Stokes thinks the Doolans are being held captive. Hendy is jealous when Stokes reveals what he wants to say at Rainer's funeral.

== Release ==
The first season, consisting of six episodes, premiered in its entirety on 22 October 2015. The second season was released on 26 October 2016.

A one-off Christmas special titled No Activity: The Night Before Christmas was commissioned and premiered on Stan in December 2018.

== Reception ==
The show was met with positive reviews. Justin Burke of The Australian wrote that it is "the funniest new comedy I’ve seen in years". James Mitchell from The Sydney Morning Herald suggested it was "the Seinfeld of Cop Shows".

== Awards and nominations ==
No Activity became the first SVOD program ever nominated for a Logie Award in 2016.

Year	Award	Category	Recipients and nominees	Result	Refs.
2016	Logie Awards of 2016	Most Outstanding Supporting Actor	Dan Wylie	Nominated	
2016	Logie Awards of 2016	Most Outstanding Supporting Actor	Tim Minchin	Nominated	
2016	Logie Awards of 2016	Most Outstanding Comedy Program	No Activity	Nominated	

== American adaptation ==
In October 2017, it was announced that CBS was developing their own version of the Australian series, No Activity with Will Ferrell, Adam McKay along with their production company, Funny or Die, as executive producers. The series was greenlit for an 8-episode first season which premiered on 12 November 2017 on CBS All Access. The series stars Patrick Brammall (from the Australian series) as Det. Nick Cullen and Tim Meadows as Det. Judd Tolbeck with a range of guest stars such as Mackenzie Davis, Jason Mantzoukas, Jesse Plemons, J.K. Simmons, Michaela Watkins, Jake Johnson (guest starred on the Australian series) along with Ferrell himself.

== Arabic adaptation ==
In August 2021, it was announced that OSN was developing their own version of the Australian series with Sally Waly along with their production company, S Productions, as executive producers Trent O'Donnell and Chloe Rickard. The series was greenlit for an 12-episode second season which premiered on 5 September 2021 on OSN Yahala Bil Arabi, OSN & S Productions collaborate on their first comedy-drama series: No Activity - الوضع مستقر (El Wad3 Mostaker).

The show saw some of Egypt's top comedic talent such as Khaled Mansour, Shadi Alfons and Sayed Ragab, take a satirical, light-hearted look at the misadventures of cops and criminals.

== Japanese adaptation ==
No Activity's Japanese adaptation stars Etsushi Toyokawa and Tomoya Nakamura. Tsutomu Hanabusa directed the series, whose scripts were written by Jiro of the comedy duo Sissonne. The series premiered on Amazon Prime Video on 17 December 2021.

== Italian adaptation ==
An Italian remake of the show, titled No Activity: Niente da Segnalare, was released on Amazon Prime Video on 18 January 2024. It stars Luca Zingaretti, Alessandro Tiberi, Emanuela Fanelli and Carla Signoris.

== Spanish adaptation ==
A Spanish remake of the show, titled Sin novedad, was released on HBO Max on 19 December 2021. It stars Omar Banana, Adriana Torrebejano, Pilar Castro and Carlos Areces.

== Flemish adaptation ==
A Flemish remake of the show, titled Niets Te Melden, was released on Streamz on 12 October 2020. It stars Charlotte Timmers, Koen De Bouw, Barbara Sarafian and Jonas Van Geel.

== See also ==
- List of Stan original programming
