= Alessandra Martines =

Italian-French dancer and actress

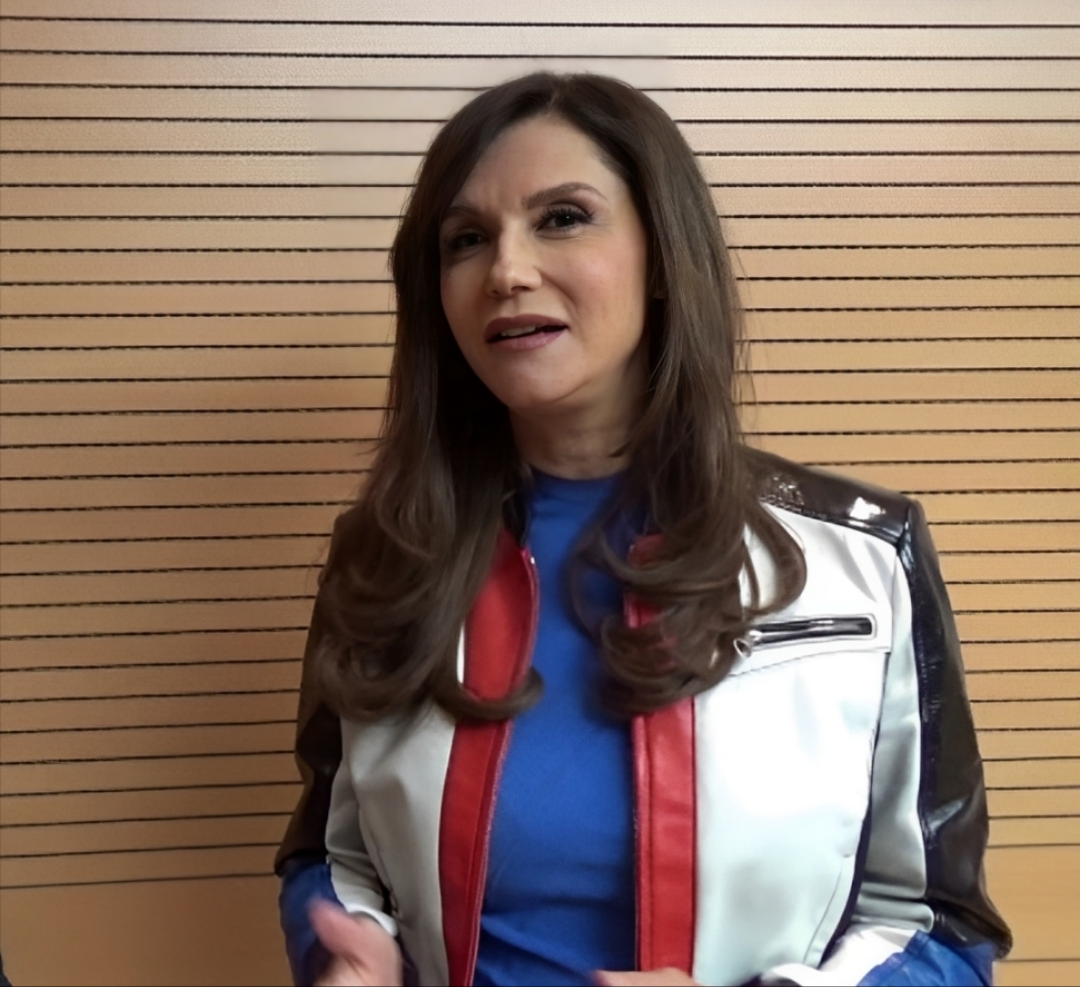
- Born: 19 September 1963 (age 63); Rome, Italy
- Education: Conservatoire de Paris
- Occupations: Dancer; actress
- Spouse: Claude Lelouch (m. 1993; div. 2009)
- Partner: Cyril Descours (2008–2018)
- Website: https://www.alessandramartines.com/

Alessandra Martines (born 19 September 1963) is an Italian French dancer and actress mainly working in the English-, French-, and Italian-speaking worlds. She started young in ballet on opera stages in Switzerland, France, the United States and then Italy before becoming a lead on television for RAI captured ballets and entertainment shows (the Italian national public broadcasting) in the eighties.

She is primarily known for portraying the main role in the cult Fantaghirò series, consisting of five films (1991–1996) still regularly re-run across Europe as of 2020, and for her work in auteur productions such as nine films by Claude Lelouch to whom she was married until 2009.

She was awarded numerous prizes including the Best Actress Telegatto for The Cave of the Golden Rose (1991), the Grolla d'oro for Edda (2005), the Silver Hugo for Best Actress at the Chicago International Film Festival (1998) for Chance or Coincidence, the Diamanti al Cinema Award in Cannes (2007) or the 2009 European Golden Globe in Rome. In 2008, she was made Knight of the Ordre national du Mérite awarded by the President of the French Republic. She received the lifetime achievement Kineo Award at the 71st Venice International Film Festival in 2014.

== Early life ==
Second cousin of Carla Bruni and Valeria Bruni Tedeschi, she moved to France with her family at the age of five. As a teenager, she enrolled at the Conservatoire de Paris where she studied solfeggio, history and theory of dance and classical music and dance.

== Career ==
Martines debuted at a young age as a dancer at the Zurich Opera House in 1972. After some time working in the United States, including the Chicago City Ballet, she moved to Rome where she worked at the Teatro dell'Opera. In 1985 she began her collaboration with RAI, with the lunchtime chat / quiz show Pronto, chi gioca?; she later gained great popularity with the Saturday Night shows Fantastico and Europa Europa, and then for her portrayal of Princess Fantaghirò in the Fantaghirò series.

In cinema, she is best known for her interpretations under the direction of her ex-husband, the French director Claude Lelouch, in several film including Les Misérables and And now... Ladies and Gentlemen. She also starred on stage, most notably in L'appartamento by Franca Valeri.

== Personal life ==
Martines has a daughter with Claude Lelouch to whom she was married between 1995 and 2009. In 2012, at the age of 49, she had a son with her partner Cyril Descours.

== Stage ==
=== Dancer ===
Year	Company	Director
1972	Ballett Zürich	Patricia Neary
1975	New York City Ballet	George Balanchine
–	Chicago Ballet	Maria Tallchief & Paul Mejia
–	Teatro dell'Opera di Roma (Fedra (Mayr) & Carmen)	Maïa Plissetskaïa
–	Opéra de Marseille	Roland Petit
	Teatro Lirico Giuseppe Verdi	Roland Petit

=== Theatre ===
Year	Play	Playwright	Director
1987–1988	Adriana Lecouvreur	An opera in four acts by Francesco Cilea to an Italian libretto by Arturo Colautti, based on the 1849 play Adrienne Lecouvreur by Eugène Scribe and Ernest Legouvé.	Mauro Bolognini
1988–1989	The Apartment	Billy Wilder	Franca Valeri
2016	Lady Windermere's Fan	Oscar Wilde – Mrs. Erlynne	Jean-Luc Revol – Théâtre Tête d'or / France national tour: 3 September – 31 December 2016.

== Filmography ==
=== Cinema ===
Year	Film	Role	Director
1988	Miss Arizona	Marta	Pál Sándor
1989	Sinbad of the Seven Seas	Alina	Enzo G. Castellari, Luigi Cozzi
1989	Saremo felici	Jole	Gianfrancesco Lazotti
1989	Passi d'amore	Elisa	Sergio Sollima
1993	Tout ça... pour ça!	Allessandra Barrucq	Claude Lelouch
1995	Les Misérables	Elise Ziman	Claude Lelouch
1996	Men, Women: A User's Manual	Doctor Nitez	Claude Lelouch
1998	Chance or Coincidence	Miriam Lini	Claude Lelouch
1999	One 4 All	Maxime	Claude Lelouch
2001	Day Off	Francesca Socoa	Pascal Thomas
2001	J'ai faim !!!	Anaïs Pommard	Florence Quentin
2002	Amnèsia	Virginie	Gabriele Salvatores
2002	And Now... Ladies and Gentlemen	Françoise	Claude Lelouch
2004	Le genre humain – 1ère partie: Les Parisiens	Herself	Claude Lelouch
2005	Le courage d'aimer	Alessandra	Claude Lelouch
2007	L'Heure Zéro	Marie-Adeline	Pascal Thomas
2008	Love Me No More	Marion Dange	Jean Becker
2011	Je m'appelle Bernadette	Louise Soubirous	Jean Sagols
2017	L'Araignée Rouge	Sonia Stern	Franck Florino

=== Television ===
Year	Film	Role	Director
1988	Cinema che follia!		Antonello Falqui
1991	Fantaghirò	Fantaghirò	Lamberto Bava
1992	Processo di famiglia		Giovanni Fabbri
1992	Fantaghirò 2	Fantaghirò	Lamberto Bava
1993	Fantaghirò 3	Fantaghirò	Lamberto Bava
1993	Colpo di coda	Paola	José María Sánchez
1994	Fantaghirò 4	Fantaghirò	Lamberto Bava
1996	Fantaghirò 5	Fantaghirò	Lamberto Bava
2003	Quelques jours entre nous	Juliette	Virginie Sauveur
2004	Saint John Bosco: Mission to Love	Marchesa Barolo	Lodovico Gasparini
2005–2010	Caterina e le sue figlie	Adele Parisi	Several
2005	I colori della vita	Giulia	Stefano Reali
2005	Edda	Edda Ciano	Giorgio Capitani
2006	L'onore e il rispetto	Francesca De Santis	Alessio Inturri, Luigi Parisi, Salvatore Samperi
2008	Il sangue e la rosa	Ortensia Damiani	Luciano Odorisio, Luigi Parisi, Salvatore Samperi
2009	La reine et le cardinal	Anne of Austria	Marc Rivière
2009	L'onore e il rispetto	Francesca De Santis	Luigi Parisi, Salvatore Samperi
2009	Panique !	Clémentine	Benoît d'Aubert
2011	Inspector Rex	Malice Bonomi	Marco Serafini
2012	Le Romancier Martin		Jérôme Foulon
2014	Furore	Luciana Belgrano	Alessio Inturri
2016	Il bello delle donne... alcuni anni dopo	Françoise Leroux	Eros Puglielli

=== Presenter or Jury member ===
Year	Film	Role	Director
2011	Danse avec les stars (French version of Strictly Come Dancing)	Jury member for season 1 & season 2.	TF1 – several.
2013–2014	The Best : Le Meilleur Artiste	Jury member for season 1 & season 2.	TF1 – several.
