= Romano Albani =

Italian cinematographer and camera operator

- Born: 25 September 1945 (age 80); Livorno, Tuscany, Italy
- Occupation: Cinematographer
- Years active: 1975 – 2008

Romano Albani (born 25 September 1945) was an Italian cinematographer and camera operator.

== Career ==
Albani started his career with commercials. His film credits include Marco Ferreri's La Dernière femme (U.S. title: The Last Woman) (1976), Dario Argento's Inferno (1980) and Phenomena (1985), Troll (1986), a remake of Roman Holiday (1987) and four of the movies in the Fantaghirò series.
