= Fantaghirò (film series) =

- Directed by: Lamberto Bava
- Written by: Gianni Romoli
- Produced by: Roberto Bessi
- Starring: Alessandra Martines; Kim Rossi Stuart; Brigitte Nielsen
- Music by: Amedeo Minghi
- Production companies: Mediaset; Reteitalia; Silvio Berlusconi Communications
- Country: Italy
- Language: Italian

Fantaghirò, also known as The Cave of the Golden Rose (La Grotta della Rosa d'Oro), is an Italian fantasy romance adventure series consisting of five television films directed by Lamberto Bava and released between 1991 and 1996. The first film was originally based on Italo Calvino's "Fanta-Ghiro the Beautiful", and takes place in a fairy tale setting, featuring princesses, princes, witches, wizards and talking animals. Shot mostly in the Czech Republic and Slovakia with the participation of local actors, and highly popular in Italy during the 1990s, it was loosely adapted into a cartoon series of the same title. A reboot series was announced in 2021.

== Films ==
=== Fantaghirò (1991) ===
Fantaghirò is the youngest of three princesses born to a warrior king. Although beautiful and intelligent, Fantaghirò causes many problems for her family because she goes against everything expected of a woman in her kingdom by being literate, adventurous, and rebellious; this makes her father furious. One day, the King receives an invitation from the enemy prince Romualdo to a duel that can potentially end the centuries-long war that has been going on between the two kingdoms. While the King learns that only one of his three daughters can win the fight, Fantaghirò sees this as a chance for her to prove herself.

=== Fantaghirò 2 (1992) ===
Fantaghirò and Romualdo are due to be married, but their wedding is cut short when news arrives that Fantaghirò's father has been kidnapped by the evil Black Witch, the queen of the Dark Kingdom. The witch demands that the kingdoms of Fantaghirò and Romualdo submit to her rule, but they refuse, and Romualdo declares war. He sets out with his army, leaving behind Fantaghirò, who has sworn not to lift another weapon for the rest of her life. Now, forced to break her oath, Fantaghirò secretly sets out to the Dark Kingdom alone to face and defeat the evil queen, who plots to separate Fantaghirò from Romualdo forever and to make him her lover.

=== Fantaghirò 3 (1993) ===
The dark wizard Tarabas learns that his powerful kingdom will be defeated by a royal child of no more than ten years of age. He becomes obsessed with learning how this will happen, so he orders his clay warriors to kidnap all of the world's royal children. When the children of Fantaghirò's sisters become targets, Fantaghirò and Romualdo protect them from the attacking clay soldiers. However, during the fight, Romualdo accidentally falls into a cursed river and turns into stone. Fantaghirò then learns that she has to find Tarabas if she wants to save her beloved Romualdo, and for that, she will need the aid of the Black Witch.

=== Fantaghirò 4 (1994) ===
A black cloud is travelling throughout the land, destroying everything it touches. When the black cloud consumes Fantaghirò's castle, she allies herself with Prince Parsel to track the black cloud to its origins and stop whoever is casting it. Along the way, Fantaghirò is reunited with the wizard Tarabas, who agrees to help them on their quest and Princess Anjelica, who is in love with Tarabas.

=== Fantaghirò 5 (1996) ===
Fantaghirò is captured by the Black Witch, who has been unable to perform her evil magic ever since she helped Fantaghirò in their previous adventures. The witch is about to execute the captured Fantaghirò when the princess is suddenly whisked away into an alternative reality where she has to join forces with a scoundrel named Aries in defeating a child-eating monstrous villain known as the Nameless.

=== Cancelled sequels ===
The producers planned a further continuation of the series, which would have included two more chapters (sixth and seventh). In these, Fantaghirò would have continued to travel to parallel worlds, each from a different fairy tale, and to our world in the modern era, helping people in need before returning home to her kingdom only to find it an alternative and dark reality where she would face an evil version of herself. Another sequel, Il ritorno di Fantaghirò (The Return of Fantaghirò), was considered by Lamberto Bava and Gianni Romoli in 2007.

== Characters ==
=== Main characters ===
==== Fantaghirò ====
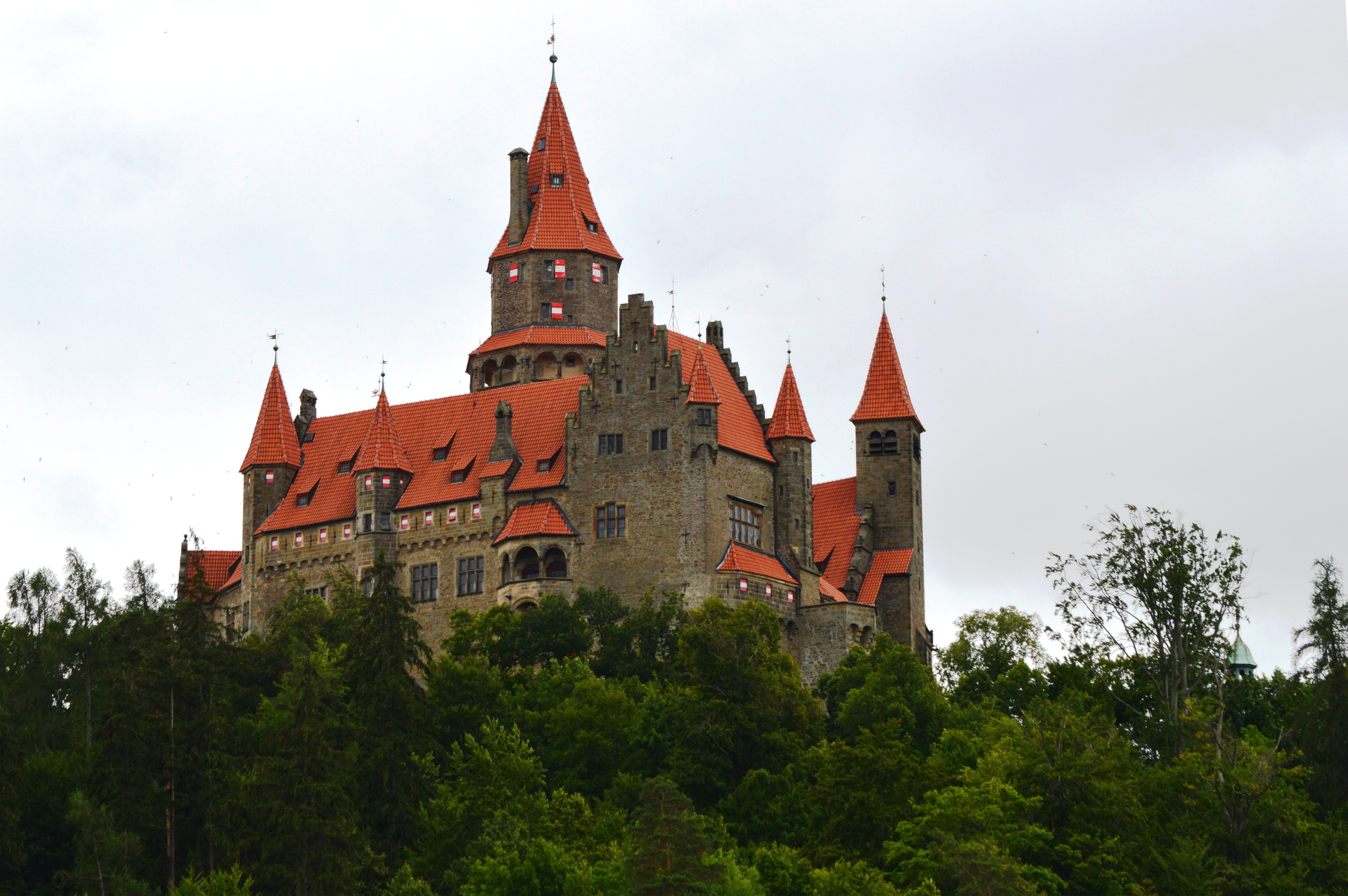
"Fantaghirò's castle" (Bouzov Castle)

Fantaghirò, portrayed by Alessandra Martines, is a strong and beautiful warrior-princess who is the main character in all five films. The youngest princess of three, she is outspoken, rebellious, and courageous, never retreating from a battle. In the first film, she is an impulsive troublemaker who grew up fascinated by weapons and adventure and who likes to provoke her father and sisters, but underneath it, she has a good heart. Fantaghirò is mentored and protected by the White Witch, also known as the White Knight, who teaches her to understand and communicate with animals; her own masculine counter-ego persona's pseudonym is the "Count of Valdoca". After Fantaghirò's mother did not survive childbirth, the baby was taken by the King to the cave where a ferocious beast lived, in order to be sacrificed there. The White Witch appeared for the first time in Fantaghirò's life to save her, explaining to the King the importance of the child.

From the second film onwards, the heroine is accepted as a female knight who will do whatever it takes to protect her loved ones, even if that means sacrificing her own life. She is deeply in love with Romualdo, previously the enemy prince and their kingdoms are now finally at peace thanks to Fantaghirò, who briefly vows to put down her sword forever. After she wins back Romualdo from her evil rival the Black Witch in the second film, they are married in the third film, adopting the orphaned Princess Esmeralda as their daughter. In the third film, Fantaghirò learns the secrets of dark magic from the Black Witch to rescue Romualdo from the evil wizard Tarabas, another of her suitors. In the fifth film, Fantaghirò becomes romantically engaged with Ares, a pirate from another world. She often rides on a white-maned palomino horse.

The series' writer Gianni Romoli said, "What fascinates me about Fantaghirò is that it is a female but also a male character, without any ambiguity. She is a friend, but also a woman partner, the one who both solves your problems and causes them." Fantaghirò has long red-brown hair which she twice cuts with a sword into a boy-cut in the first and second films, but in the third film onwards she only has a boy-cut. She tries to befriend all creatures and people she meets unless they try to harm those she cares about. In the first chapter, Fantaghirò wears a blue and orange tunic, the sky blue and gold being the colours of the heirs to the throne in Italian tradition, before disguising herself as a man in order to fight. She is very forgiving and looks past physical appearances. The role launched Martines' career.

==== Romualdo ====
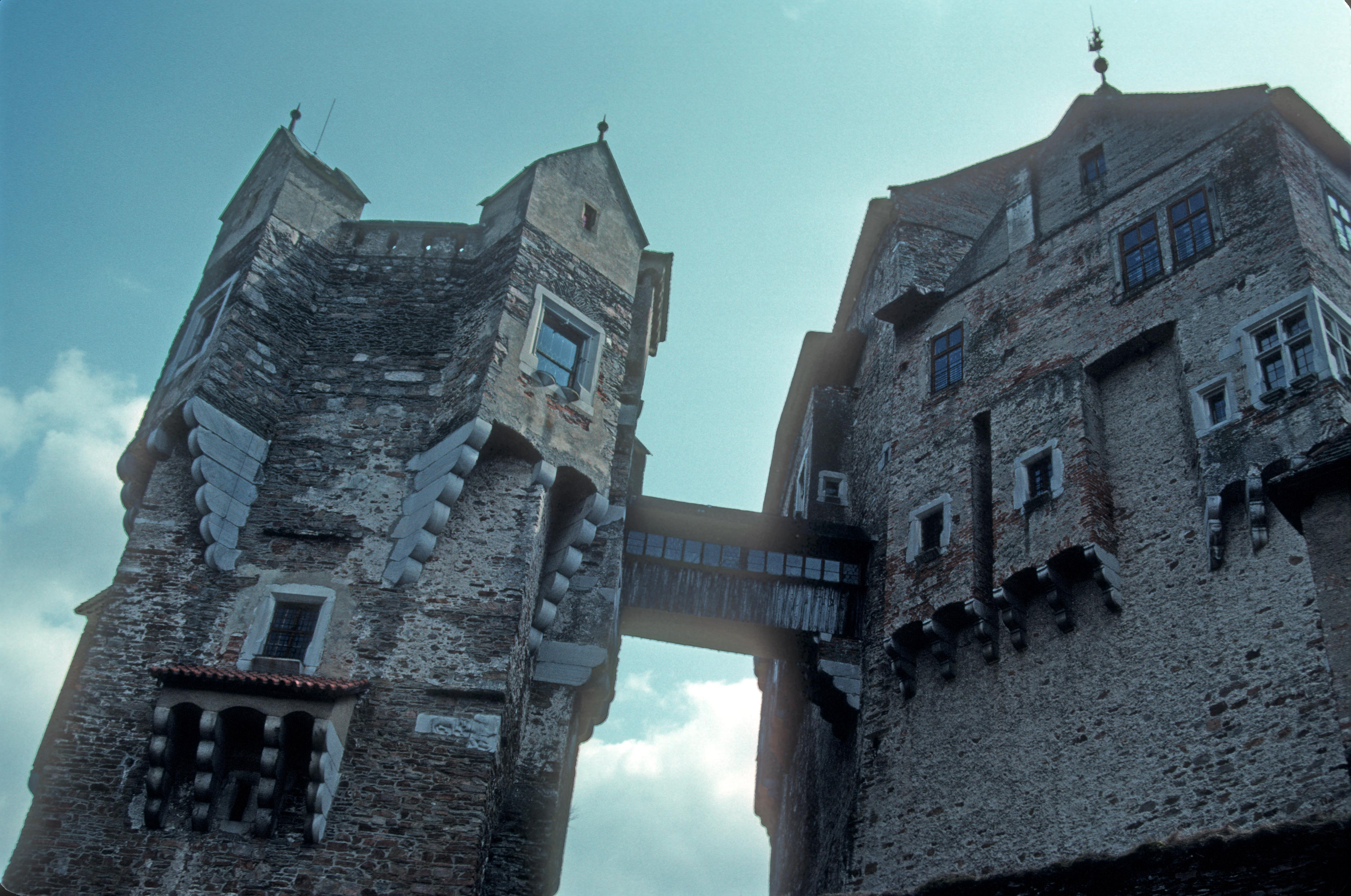
"Romualdo's castle" (Pernštejn Castle)

Romualdo, portrayed by Kim Rossi Stuart, is a prince who becomes Fantaghirò's beloved and later her husband. After the death of his father, Romualdo seeks to end the centuries-long war his ancestors have waged against Fantaghirò's people by challenging her father to single combat. He falls in love with Fantaghirò in the first film and becomes obsessed with finding her, even as he is initially confused by her androgynous traits. He is shocked when he meets her properly for the first time, as she has chosen to replace her father as Romualdo's opponent, and is disguised as a man, and experiences an inner conflict over his feeling for his opponent. Eventually, he learns that she is a princess. The two are betrothed and their kingdoms reconcile.

They are due to be married early in the second film, but the ceremony is postponed when the Black Witch kidnaps Fantaghirò's father. Romualdo becomes the witch's next target and she puts a spell on him to make him completely forget about Fantaghirò. He becomes the lover of the Black Witch who sends him as her champion to a duel against Fantaghirò; however, he regains his memories thanks to Fantaghirò and the White Witch. Stuart named his character's alternate persona RomuAltro, saying, "In fact, ensnared by the Black Witch, I change nature. I confess that this new character amused me more than the other."

After that, Romualdo is reduced to a secondary character. In the third film, he is turned into a statue whilst fighting Tarabas' men and is only revived near the end of the movie, when the pair are finally married. In the fourth film, Stuart did not want to return for the role, so Romualdo was transformed into the hideously ugly Fiodor, portrayed by Riccardo Serventi Longhi. At the end of the film, Fiodor is transformed back into Romualdo. Romualdo does not appear at all in the fifth film, except in flashbacks.

==== Black Witch ====
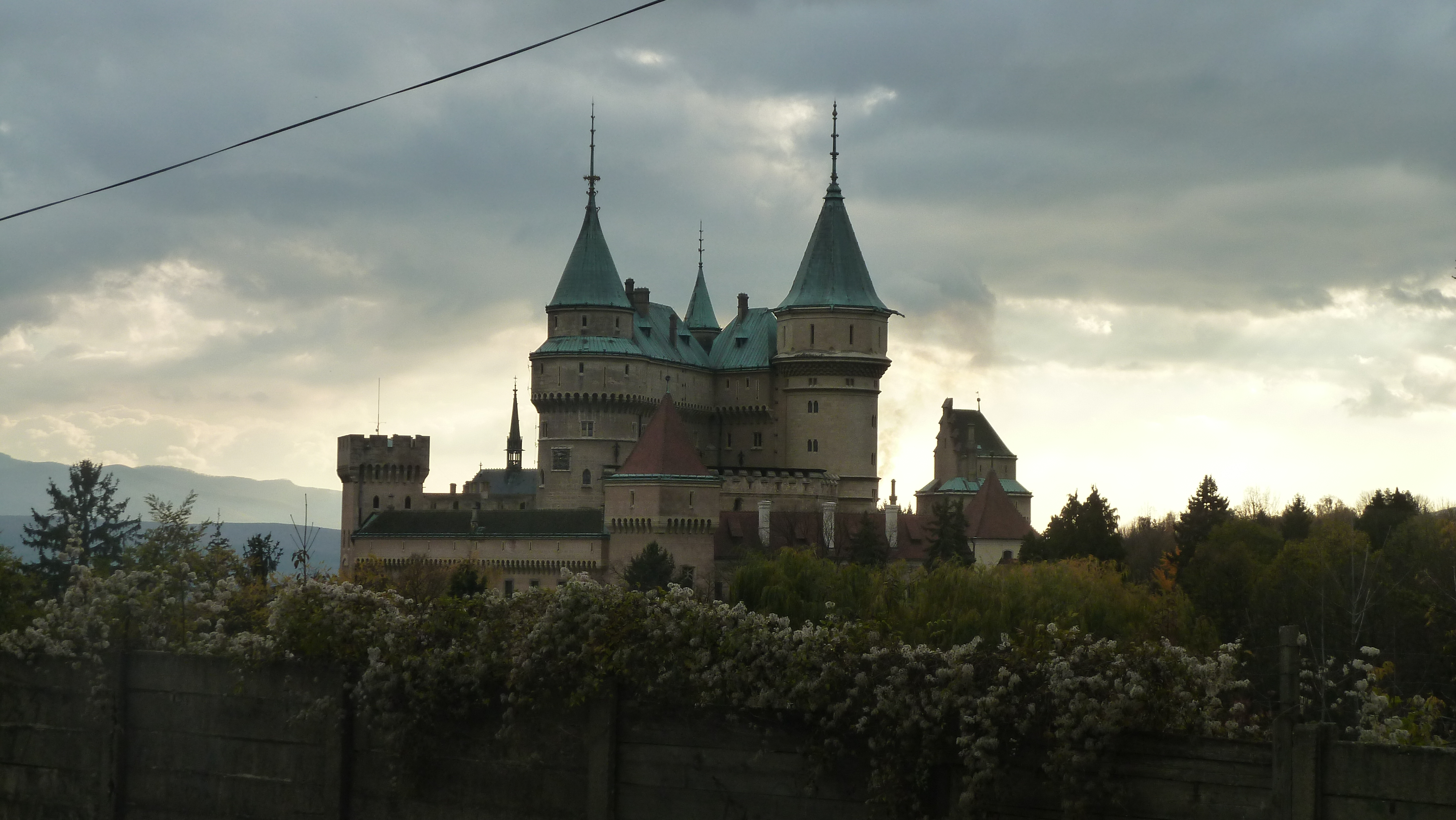
"Black Witch's castle" (Bojnice Castle)

The Black Witch (Strega Nera), also known as the Black Queen (Regina Nera), portrayed by Brigitte Nielsen (original Italian dubbing by Aurora Cancian), is the evil counterpart of the White Witch and the self-declared arch-enemy of Princess Fantaghirò. She is introduced in the second film as the vain and cruel ruler of the faraway Dark Kingdom who plots to destroy Fantaghirò and Romualdo's pure romantic relationship. At first, the witch demands to rule their lands, but soon she also begins to desire the handsome prince for herself. She lures them both to her kingdom by kidnapping Fantaghirò's father, who becomes her figurehead, the Dark King. She then turns herself into Fantaghirò to make Romualdo kiss her for a spell that turns him into her slave whom she orders to slay the princess. But Fantaghirò manages to outsmart her rival and the Black Witch is turned to crystal (later retconned to stone) and smashed into pieces. A part of herself is preserved inside Romualdo's mind until it is eradicated by the White Witch as she again comes to Fantaghirò's rescue.

However, the Black Witch's character turned out to be so popular that the director decided to bring her back for all the next chapters of the saga. In the third film, Fantaghirò and the Black Witch's former apprentice minions, Bolt and Lightning, reluctantly restore her to life because Fantaghirò needs the help of her magic against Tarabas, and the witch is forced to teach the princess. At the height of her power in the second film, she could transform herself as well as other living beings and objects near her into anyone or anything at will (including turning herself into an eagle and Fantaghiro into a bullfrog). However, once the Black Witch has helped the good Fantaghirò, her evil powers become greatly weakened. In the fourth and fifth films, she constantly tries to get rid of Fantaghirò so she can be powerful again.

The original script envisioned the Black Witch as a blonde. Director Lamberto Bava said that otherwise, she looked just as he and the screenwriter imagined her: "gigantic (between heels and helmet she reaches two meters), beautiful, with all the sexy power that transpires from her costume's abysmal slit and generous décolleté." Nielsen said she based her deliberately over-the-top "seductive, sinister, choleric, and excessive in everything" acting in Fantaghiro 2 on a deliberately greatly exaggerated interpretation of the character of the Evil Queen (known in Italy as Grimilde) in Disney's Snow White, adding she really enjoyed being "an angry and screaming witch". According to the Italian Wired in 2017, she was one of the reasons for the series' popularity in the country, described as "a unique and memorable character ... a majestic monument of irrational evil, busty and very tall, with heavy make-up and strictly black and skimpy dresses, the wicked queen is the ultimate glamorous incarnation of any fairy tale villain." Her wardrobe and hair colour (from long red to medium black) radically change between the second film and the later instalments after her resurrection, as do most of her other aspects. Nevertheless, despite having been reduced from an imperious and sensual villainess remembered for her imposing figure and cold gaze to a comically hysterical character in a much more campy, even drag queen-like portrayal in the sequels, the Black Witch has remained a fan-favourite and one of the few roles in Nielsen's career of which she remained proud.

==== Tarabas ====
Tarabas, portrayed by Nicholas Rogers (original Italian dubbing by Francesco Prando), is a broodingly attractive wizard who appears in the third and fourth films as the son of the terrible wizard Darken and the evil witch Xellesia, living with the latter. His name came from the writer Gianni Romo's passion for the comic book series Dylan Dog, where a character named Xarabas appears in one story. Rogers' role was known for having "charmed the female and gay male audience with his penetrating gaze".

He is initially a very powerful villain who is feared by magicians in every kingdom, but he discovers a prophecy that a royal child no older than ten years shall defeat him. Tarabas becomes obsessed with learning how he will be defeated and sends his men to kidnap all royal children, during which the parents of young Princess Esmeralda are killed. He crosses paths with Fantaghirò and falls madly in love with her, eventually asking her to marry him in exchange for reviving Romualdo, whom he has been turned into stone. Eventually, Tarabas lets Fantaghirò free from her promise and the two kiss once, restoring him from being transformed into a beast back into his human form, and promises Fantaghirò not to be evil anymore for her sake before she returns to her true love.

He then redeems himself with Esmeralda by allowing her to see her parents one last time, an act of kindness which fulfils the prophecy of his dark powers' downfall. Tarabas renounces his evil ways and lives in peace until the fourth film when he is accused of creating a destructive black cloud consuming all in its path. Tarabas reunites with Fantaghirò to track down the source of the black cloud and discovers that it was conjured by his father, Darken. At the end of the fourth film, Tarabas decides to renounce his love for Fantaghirò and stay with Princess Angelica of Tohor.

=== Other major characters ===
- Angelica, portrayed by Agathe de La Fontaine, is the princess of the oriental kingdom of Tohor. She has listened to stories of Tarabas since he was a dark wizard. When she learns that Tarabas is in her kingdom, she finds him and declares her love for him. Tarabas rebuffs her affections throughout the entire movie until the very end when he promises to try to love her.
- Bolt (Saetta), portrayed by Lenca Kubalkova, is a magical sprite and sister of Lightning. Introduced in the second film, she is originally a minion of the Black Witch, but betrays her and joins the side of good with Fantaghirò. In the third film, Bolt says that she and her brother are now training to be angels. They both can transform into flying bolts of lightning.
- Caroline (Carolina), portrayed by Kateřina Brožová, is one of Fantaghirò's sisters. She has golden hair, is a romantic and is aware of her beauty, traits that usually infuriate Fantaghirò. In the first film she marries Ivaldo, she is pregnant in the second film, and in the third film, she has a son. She can briefly be seen in the fourth film, but only at distance, and her face cannot be seen clearly.
- Cataldo, portrayed by Stefano Davanzati, is one of Romualdo's closest friends. He appears in the first and second films as Romualdo's companion. He comes up with the idea of holding a swimming competition to reveal Fantaghirò's true gender in the first film. He later falls in love with and marries Catherine.
- Catherine (Caterina), portrayed by Ornella Marcucci in the first film and Barbora Kodetová in the second and third films, is the eldest sister of Fantaghirò. She is level-headed, wise and patient. She marries Cataldo in the first film, is pregnant in the second film, and has a son in the third film. She has a non-speaking role in the fourth film when their castle is shrunk to the size of a toy, but her face cannot be seen clearly.
- Darken, portrayed by Horst Buchholz, is a cruel wizard so powerful that it is forbidden to speak his name. He is the father of Tarabas and wants his son to be just as evil as he is. He appears in the fourth film as the main villain who creates a black cloud that causes destruction wherever it goes. He is powerful enough to revive the dead with a kiss and wields a sword forged from the blood of giants.
- Esmeralda (Smeralda), portrayed by Elena D'Ippolito, is a young princess seen in the third film. Her parents are killed when Tarabas's clay soldiers attack under his command to kidnap all the royal children of the world. Fantaghirò takes Esmeralda under her care and eventually adopts her. Esmeralda is playful and headstrong, much like Fantaghirò was in her youth.
- Goldeye (Occhio d'Oro), portrayed by Karel Roden, is a minor villain in the second film. He is a bandit who robs anyone he comes across. Fantaghirò humiliates him at the beginning of the film by beating him in armed combat. Later their paths cross again and Goldeye tries to get his revenge by making Fantaghirò dress up as a belly dancer.
- Ivaldo, portrayed by Tomáš Valík, is one of Romualdo's closest friends and appears in the first and second films. He later falls in love with and marries Caroline.
- The King, portrayed by Mario Adorf, is Fantaghirò's father and appears in the first two films. He is initially disappointed by Fantaghirò's birth, as he had been expecting a son, who would become his heir. His disappointment worsens when she grows up refusing to be meek and obedient as all women in his kingdom are expected to be. However, he grows to care for Fantaghirò over the first film and accepts her as she is. In the second film, he is kidnapped by the Black Witch (Black Queen) and is magically hypnotised into becoming the figure of Dark King, a supposed ruler of the Dark Kingdom and the witch's consort but really just her mindless slave.
- Lightning (Fulmine), portrayed by Jakub Zdeněk, is a magical sprite and older brother of Bolt. He secretly hates his evil mistress, the Black Witch, and starts to rebel against her early in the second film, and instigates Bolt to do the same. At the end of the movie, he gladly helps the White Witch to destroy the Black Witch, saying that he had waited for a long time to do it. In the third film, when he and Bolt reluctantly put all the stone pieces of the Black Witch back together to restore her to life, Lightning keeps the witch's heart as leverage.
- Nameless (Senza Nome), portrayed by Remo Girone, is the villain of the fifth film. He is an ogre made of enchanted apalicandro wood, which renders him invulnerable to almost all attacks. Created with the magic of a hundred witches, Nameless was created in order to end a centuries-long magical war of attrition, only to rebel against his creators and destroy them. Since then he travels through different worlds on a flying galleon in order to become more human by feeding on children. His presence alone is enough to transform food items into deadly monsters.
- The Queen of the Elves (Regina Degli Elfi), portrayed by Aňa Geislerová, is the Queen of the Forest Elves. She is beautiful and wears a gown of red and gold leaves. In the second film, she stops Romualdo and his army who are on the way to the Dark Kingdom. She gives Romualdo three tests to prove his worth. In the third film, she is visited by Fantaghirò, who needs help in breaking a curse that has turned Romualdo into a stone. The Queen of the Elves tells Fantaghirò that the wizard she seeks is Tarabas.
- The White Witch (Strega Bianca), portrayed by Ángela Molina in the first film and Katarína Kolajová in the second film, is a good witch and friend of Fantaghirò. She has been instrumental in protecting and guiding Fantaghirò ever since she was a baby. The White Witch can turn herself into various animals, including a goose, a mouse and a cat. She also transformed herself into her White Knight persona in order to train Fantaghirò in the art of swordsmanship. In the second film, the White Witch renounces her powers in order to free Fantaghirò from a promise that the princess had made, but later shows up to destroy the remnants of the Black Witch. Although she does not appear in the later films, early in the third film it is mentioned that she has retired to the country.
- Xellesia, portrayed by Ursula Andress, is an evil witch and the mother of Tarabas, also known as the Queen of Darkness. She is conniving, and wicked, and tries her best to keep her son away from all things good and warm. She appears in the third and fourth films. By the end of the third film, the reformed Tarabas tires of his mother's evil ways and robs her of her powers. In the fourth film, she confesses that she has always loved Tarabas but has had to keep her love hidden from him. She proves this by sacrificing herself so that Tarabas can escape to safety.

== Production and release history ==
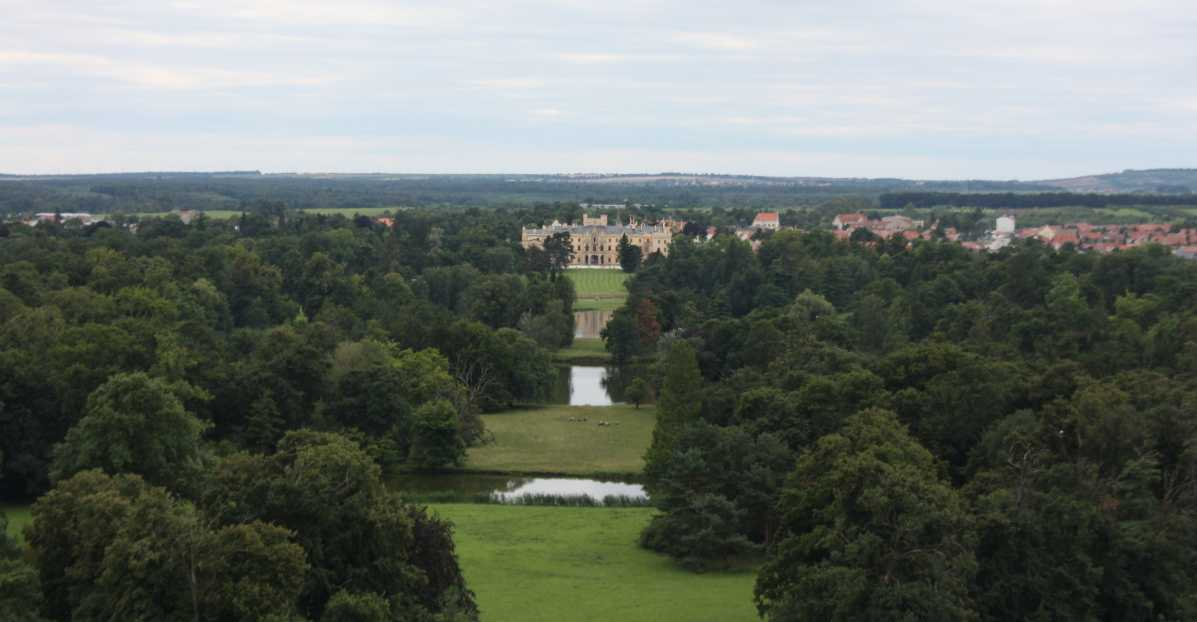
Much of the early series was shot in a park in Lednice, Czech Republic

The series' premise is based on Italo Calvino's "Fanta-Ghiro the Beautiful", a short story inspired by a Tuscan folk tale from the late 19th century. Director Lamberto Bava said the films were influenced by Legend, Ladyhawke and Willow, as well as by Disney animated movies and the 1950s fantasy cinema. Initially Fantaghirò was to be a single film but the production costs were excessive and so it was decided to make it as a miniseries. Fantaghiro was produced by Rete Italia and filmed mostly in the former Czechoslovakia; the last two films were shot Thailand and Cuba. The musical score, including the theme song "Mio nemico" ("My Enemy"), was written by Amedeo Minghi and performed by Rossana Casale.

Brigitte Nielsen's role as the Black Witch was received so well by the public that Bava decided to revive her killed-off character for three successive chapters of the saga. Kim Rossi Stuart, who has auditioned for the part of Romualdo at the age of 22, after only two films in the TV series has already decided to not want to play his character anymore (his brief appearance in the fourth film was achieved through the use of stock footage from the first film); for this reason, every sequel in the series has been developed based on the choices of the actors to stay or leave the cast.

The series has been shown in more than 50 countries and was dubbed in several languages, Bulgarian, Czech, Slovak, English, French, Polish, German, Spanish, Hungarian, Ukrainian, Russian, Georgian and Sinhala. Martines gained popularity thanks to the success of Fantaghirò and voiced herself in the French version. The first three films were recut (reduced and intersected with each other) into a 200-minute compilation film titled La meravigliosa storia di Fantaghirò ("The Wonderful Story of Fantaghirò") in 1995. Between December 22, 2011 (20 years to the first airing), and January 30, 2012, the saga was aired on Italia 1 as a television series of 40 episodes lasting 20 minutes each. Its new theme song by Amedeo Minghi and Arianna Bergamaschi, Crederò ("I Will Believe") was included on the 2011 compilation soundtrack CD Il Fantastico Mondo di Fantaghirò ("The Fantastic World of Fantaghirò"). A restored and remastered edition of the series was released on DVD and Blu-ray in 2016 in Italy, Germany, and France. The series was also made available at streaming services Netflix and Amazon Prime.

The sixth and seventh films in the series were never realized due to a dramatic decline of audience recorded during the airing of Fantaghirò 5 on Christmas 1996, and so the project was shelved. A proposal for another sequel was again presented to Mediaset by Bava and Romo in 2007, following the continuous pressure of the fans of the series who were disappointed by how the fifth episode ended. Martines, Nielsen and Rogers confirmed their availability, but the project never came to fruition due to difficulties in co-production and the costs being deemed too high for its realization.

== Legacy ==
The series' high popularity and cult success during the early 1990s led Bava to make a few other television movies in a similar style for Mediaset, including Desideria e l'Anello del Drago (Desideria), La Principessa e il Povero (The Princess and the Pauper) and Sorellina e il Principe del Sogno (Princess Alisea). It also led to the creation of a 1999-2000 Spanish-Italian animated television series by BRB Internacional and Mediaset, also titled Fantaghirò and co-written by Bava but only loosely based on the live-action series. A theme restaurant Fantaghiro opened in Rome in 2001. Italian writer Doriana DelGallo wrote three books published only in Germany in the Prinzessin Fantaghiro series in 1995–1997.

== Reboot ==
A reboot television series, titled Fantaghirò: La Regina dei Due Regni (Fantaghirò: The Queen of Two Kingdoms), was announced as in development in late February 2021 by Leone Film Group's Lotus Production, to be produced by Gianni Romoli and directed by Nicola Abbatangelo. Abbotangelo said, "It is not a remake and I am treating it with gloves starting from the original fairy tale to reach the hearts of many people today. It has to be a story of now and it has to be contextualized." Albeit it is unknown who may replace them as Fantaghiro and The Black Witch, Martinez and Nielsen are rumored to return in the other roles. The reboot will be released on Disney Plus. The original series' director Bava commented: "I read it in the newspapers a few months ago, nobody told me about it and nobody asked me to cooperate. If they want to make a great Italian production, that's fine, but if they want to re-propose the same characters, that was our lot because Calvino's fairy tale is only 4 pages long."
