= List of films: F =

indexed lists of films
0–9	A	B	C	D	E	F
G	H	I	J–K	L	M	N–O
P	Q–R	S	T	U–V–W	X–Y–Z	

This is an alphabetical list of film articles (or sections within articles about films). It includes made for television films. See the talk page for the method of indexing used.

== F ==
- F (2010)
- F1 (2025)
- F2: Fun and Frustration (2019)
- F3 (2022)
- F for Fake (1974)
- The F Word: (2005 & 2013)
- F.I.S.T. (1978)
- F/X (1986)
- F/X2 (1991)
- The F**k-It List (2020)

=== Fa ===
==== Faa–Fag ====
- Faactory (2021)
- Faand: The Trap (2014)
- Faas (2022)
- Faat Kiné (2000)
- Faati Ne? (2023)
- The Fab Five (2011 TV)
- Fab Five: The Texas Cheerleader Scandal (2008 TV)
- The Fabelmans (2022)
- Fabian (1980)
- Fabian: Going to the Dogs (2021)
- Fabiola: (1918 & 1949)
- The Fable of Elvira and Farina and the Meal Ticket (1915)
- The Fable of the Kid Who Shifted His Ideals to Golf and Finally Became a Baseball Fan and Took the Only Known Cure (1916)
- The Fable of the Roistering Blades (1915)
- The Fable of the Small Town Favorite Who Was Ruined by Too Much Competition (1916)
- Fabulous (2019)
- The Fabulous Allan Carr (2017)
- The Fabulous Baker Boys (1989)
- The Fabulous Baron Munchausen (1962)
- The Fabulous Bastard from Chicago (1969)
- Fabulous Boys (2013)
- The Fabulous Doctor Fable (1973)
- The Fabulous Dorseys (1947)
- The Fabulous Joe (1947)
- The Fabulous Senorita (1952)
- The Fabulous Suzanne (1946)
- The Fabulous Texan (1947)
- The Fabulous Udin (2016)
- The Fabulous Voyage of the Angel (1991)
- Face: (1997, 2000, 2004 & 2009)
- The Face of Another (1966)
- A Face in the Crowd (1957)
- A Face to Die For (1996 TV)
- Face to Face: (1952, 1963, 1967, 1976, 1979, 1984 & 2011)
- Face 2 Face: (2012 American & 2012 Malayalam)
- The Face of Fu Manchu (1965)
- Face of the Screaming Werewolf (1964)
- Face/Off (1997)
- Faceless: (1988 & 2016)
- Faces: (1934 & 1968)
- Faces of Death: (1978 & 2026)
- Faces Places (2017)
- Facing the Giants (2006)
- Facing the Wall (2016)
- Facing Windows (2003)
- Fackham Hall (2025)
- Factory Boss (2014)
- Factory Girl (2006)
- Factotum (2006)
- The Faculty (1998)
- Fade to Black: (1980 & 2004)
- Fading of the Cries (2011)
- Fading Gigolo (2013)
- Fading Wave (2015)
- Faeries: (1981 & 1999)
- Fag Hag (1998)
- Fagara (2019)
- Fager er lien (1925)
- Faggot (2016)
- Fags in the Fast Lane (2017)

==== Fah–Fai ====
- Fah (1998)
- Fahavalo, Madagascar 1947 (2018)
- Fahim (2019)
- Fahrenheit 451: (1966 & 2018)
- Fahrenheit 9/11 (2004)
- Fahrenheit 11/9 (2018)
- FahrenHYPE 9/11 (2004)
- Fahuneyvaa (1998)
- Fail-Safe: (1964 & 2000 TV)
- Failan (2001)
- Failure! (2023)
- Failure to Launch (2006)
- The Fair (1960)
- Fair Enough (1918)
- Fair Exchange (1936)
- Fair Game: (1928, 1986, 1995, 2005 & 2010)
- Fair Haven (2016)
- Fair Lady (1922)
- Fair & Lovely (2014)
- Fair and Muddy (1928)
- Fair Passenger (1957 TV)
- Fair Play: (1925, 2014 & 2023)
- Fair Sex (2012)
- Fair and Warmer (1919)
- Fair Warning: (1931 & 1937)
- Fair Week (1924)
- Fair Wind, "Blue Bird"! (1967)
- Fair Wind to Java (1953)
- Fair and Worm-er (1946)
- Fairhaven (2012)
- The Fairly OddParents series:
  - A Fairly Odd Movie: Grow Up, Timmy Turner! (2011 TV)
  - A Fairly Odd Christmas (2012 TV)
  - A Fairly Odd Summer (2014 TV)
- Fairplay (2022)
- Fairy (2020)
- The Fairy (2011)
- Fairy Folk (2024)
- Fairy Tail series:
  - Fairy Tail the Movie: Phoenix Priestess (2012)
  - Fairy Tail: Dragon Cry (2017)
- Fairy Tale Killer (2012)
- Fairy Tales (1978)
- Fairyland (2023)
- The Fairylogue and Radio-Plays (1908)
- Fairytale (2022)
- Fairytale of Kathmandu (2007)
- FairyTale: A True Story (1997)
- Fais-moi plaisir! (2009)
- Faith: (1916, 1919 &1920)
- Faith Based (2020)
- Faith, Fraud, & Minimum Wage (2011)
- Faith, Hope & Love (2019)
- Faith, Hope and Witchcraft (1960)
- Faith of My Fathers (2005)
- Faith of Our Fathers (2015)
- Faith like Potatoes (2006)
- Faith School Menace? (2010 TV)
- Faithful: (1910, 1936 & 1996)
- The Faithful Heart: (1922 & 1932)
- Faithful in My Fashion (1946)
- The Faithful Son (2017)
- Faithfully Yours: (1988 & 2022)
- Faithfulness (1965)
- Faithless: (1932 & 2000)
- Faithless Lover (1928)

==== Fak ====
- Fake (2003)
- The Fake (1927)
- The Fake (1953)
- The Fake (2013)
- A Fake Diamond Swindler (1908)
- The Fake Emir (1924)
- Fake Famous (2021)
- Fake Fiction (2013)
- Fake Fruit Factory (1986)
- Fake It So Real (2011)
- Fake-Out (1982)
- Fake Tattoos (2017)
- The Faker (1929)
- Fakers (2004)
- Fakin' da Funk (1997)
- Faking a Murderer (2020)
- The Fakir of the Grand Hotel (1934)
- The Fakir of Venice (2009)
- Faktas (1981)

==== Fal ====
- Falcon Rising (2014)
- The Falcon and the Snowman (1985)
- The Falcon Takes Over (1942)
- Falcons (2002)
- Falkenberg Farewell (2006)
- Fall (2022)
- Fall 2: Deadpoint (2026)
- The Fall: (2006 & 2008)
- The Fall of Ako Castle (1978)
- The Fall of the Essex Boys (2013)
- A Fall from Grace (2020)
- Fall Guy: (1947 & 1982)
- The Fall Guy: (1921, 1930 & 2024)
- The Fall of the House of Usher: (1928 American, 1928 French & 1950)
- Fall in Love Like a Star (2015)
- Fall of the Mohicans (1965)
- The Fall of the Roman Empire (1964)
- Fallen: (1998 & 2016)
- Fallen Angel: (1945, 1981 TV & 2003 TV)
- Fallen Angels (1995)
- The Fallen Idol (1948)
- Fallen Leaves (2023)
- Falling: (2015, 2017 & 2020)
- The Falling: (1986 & 2014)
- Falling for Christmas (2022)
- Falling Down (1993)
- Falling Flowers (2012)
- Falling Hare (1943)
- Falling Leaves: (1912 & 1966)
- Falling in Love: (1935 & 1984)
- The Fallout (2021)
- The Falls: (1980 & 2021)
- False Arrest (1991)
- False Hare (1964)
- False Positive (2021)
- Falstaff (1965)

==== Fam ====
- Fame: (1936, 1980 & 2009)
- Fame and Fortune (1918)
- Fame Is the Name of the Game (1966)
- Fame Is the Spur (1947)
- Familia: (1996, 2005, 2023 & 2024)
- Familiar Grounds (2011)
- Familiar Strangers (2008)
- Familiar Touch (2024)
- Familien på Borgan (1939)
- Familien Gyldenkål (1975)
- Familien Olsen (1940)
- Familien Pille som Spejdere (1915)
- Families (2015)
- La Famille Bélier (2014)
- Famille et variations (1977)
- Familles je vous hais (1997)
- Family: (2001 Dutch, 2001 Japanese, 2006, 2018, 2023 & 2024)
- Family 2 (2001)
- Family Affair (2010)
- Family Affairs (2024)
- Family Album: (2023, 2024 Argentine & 2024 Peruvian)
- Family Blood (2018)
- Family Bonus (1937)
- Family Business: (1986 & 1989)
- Family Camp (2022)
- Family Circles (1949)
- Family Circus: (2001 & 2018)
- Family Demons (2009)
- Family Diary (1962)
- Family Drama: (2021 & 2024)
- Family Film (2015)
- Family First (2018)
- Family Flight (1972 TV)
- Family Game: (2007 & 2022)
- The Family Game (1983)
- Family Gathering (1988)
- Family Gathering in the House of Prellstein (1927)
- Family Gbese (2024)
- Family Happiness (1969)
- Family History: (2006 & 2019)
- Family Honeymoon (1949)
- The Family Jewels (1965)
- Family Katta (2016)
- Family Law (2006)
- Family Life: (1971 British, 1971 Polish, 1985 & 2017)
- The Family Man (2000)
- Family Matters: (1993 & 2022)
- The Family McMullen (2025)
- Family Meeting (2019)
- Family Name (2006)
- Family Nest (1979)
- Family Pack: (2000, 2022 & 2024)
- Family Padam (2024)
- Family Parade (1936)
- Family Party (2015)
- Family Pictures (1993 TV)
- Family Plan: (1997 & 2005 TV)
- Family Plot (1976)
- Family Portrait in Black and White (2011)
- Family Portraits: A Trilogy of America (2003)
- Family Prayers (1993)
- Family Relations (1981)
- Family Resemblances (1996)
- Family Reunion: (1981 TV & 1988 TV)
- Family Reunion: A Relative Nightmare (1995)
- Family Romance, LLC (2019)
- The Family Secret: (1924, 1936 & 1951)
- Family Secrets: (1984 TV & 2011)
- Family Sins (1987 TV)
- Family Squares (2022)
- The Family Stone (2005)
- Family Switch (2023)
- The Family That Preys (2008)
- Family Therapy (2024)
- Family Ties (2006)
- Family Time (2023)
- Family Tree: (1999 & 2010)
- Family Troubles (1943)
- Family United (2013)
- Family Video Diaries: Daughter of the Bride (1997)
- Family Viewing (1987)
- Family Way (2012)
- The Family Way (1966)
- Family Weekend (2013)
- Familyhood (2016)

==== Fan ====
- Fan: (2007 & 2016)
- The Fan: (1949, 1951, 1958, 1981 & 1996)
- Fan Chan (2003)
- Fan Girl: (2015 & 2020)
- A Fan's Notes (1972)
- Fanaa: (2006 & 2010)
- Fanatic: (1965 & 1982)
- The Fanatic (2019)
- Fanatical: The Catfishing of Tegan and Sara (2024)
- Fanatics: (1917 & 2012)
- Fanatisme (1934)
- Fanboys (2009)
- Fanchon the Cricket (1915)
- Fancy Baggage (1929)
- Fancy Dance (2023)
- Fancy Dress: (1919 & 2019)
- Fancy Pants (1950)
- Fancy Paradise (1968)
- Fandango: (1949 & 1985)
- Fando and Lis (1972)
- The Fandom (2020)
- Fanfan la Tulipe: (1925, 1952 & 2003)
- Fanfare (1958)
- Fanfare for a Death Scene (1964 TV)
- Fanfare of Marriage (1953)
- Fanfares of Love (1951)
- Fanfic (2023)
- Fang: (2018 & 2022)
- Fang and Claw (1935)
- Fangio, the Demon of the Tracks (1950)
- Fangio: Una vita a 300 all'ora (1981)
- Fangs of the Arctic (1953)
- Fangs of Destiny (1927)
- Fangs of Fate: (1925 & 1928)
- Fangs of Justice (1926)
- Fangs of the Wild: (1928, 1939 & 1954)
- Fanie Fourie's Lobola (2013)
- Fanmi (2021)
- Fanny: (1932, 1933, 1961 & 2013)
- Fanny and Alexander (1982)
- Fanny Elssler: (1920 & 1937)
- Fanny Foley Herself (1931)
- Fanny by Gaslight (1944)
- Fanny Hill: (1964, 1968 & 1983)
- Fanny Hill series:
  - Fanny Hill Meets Lady Chatterly (1967)
  - Fanny Hill Meets Dr. Erotico (1967)
  - Fanny Hill Meets the Red Baron (1967)
- Fanny Lye Deliver'd (2019)
- Fanny: The Right to Rock (2021)
- Fanny Straw Hair (1984)
- Fant (1937)
- Fantabulous Inc. (1968)
- Fantaghirò series:
  - Fantaghirò (1991 TV)
  - Fantaghirò 2 (1992 TV)
  - Fantaghirò 3 (1993 TV)
  - Fantaghirò 4 (1994 TV)
  - Fantaghirò 5 (1996 TV)
- Fantasia: (1940, 2004 & 2014)
- Fantasia 2000 (1999)
- Fantasia Among the Squares (1971)
- Fantasies (1981)
- The Fantasist (1986)
- Fantasm (1976)
- Fantasm Comes Again (1977)
- Fantasma d'amore (1981)
- Fantasmagorie (1908)
- Fantasmas asustados (1951)
- Fantasmas en Buenos Aires (1942)
- Fantastic Beasts and Where to Find Them series:
  - Fantastic Beasts and Where to Find Them (2016)
  - Fantastic Beasts: The Crimes of Grindelwald (2018)
  - Fantastic Beasts: The Secrets of Dumbledore (2022)
- A Fantastic Fear of Everything (2012)
- Fantastic Four:
  - Fantastic Four: (1994, 2005 & 2015)
  - Fantastic Four: Rise of the Silver Surfer (2007)
  - The Fantastic Four: First Steps (2025)
- Fantastic Fungi (2019)
- Fantastic Journey to Oz (2017)
- Fantastic Machine (2023)
- Fantastic Mr. Fox (2009)
- Fantastic Night: (1942 & 1943)
- Fantastic Planet (1973)
- The Fantastic Plastic Machine (1969)
- Fantastic Return to Oz (2019)
- A Fantastic Tale of Naruto (1957)
- Fantastic Voyage (1966)
- A Fantastic Woman (2017)
- Fantastica: (1980 & 2018)
- A Fantastical Meal (1900)
- The Fantasticks (1995)
- Fantasy (2025)
- Fantasy A Gets a Mattress (2023)
- Fantasy Football (2022)
- Fantasy of the Girls (2018)
- Fantasy Island (2020)
- Fantasy Life (2025)
- Fantasy Man (1984)
- Fantasy Mission Force (1983)
- Fante-Anne (1920)
- Fantegutten (1932)
- Fantômas: (1913, 1920, 1932, 1946 & 1964)
- Fantomas Against Fantomas (1949)
- Fantozzi series:
  - Fantozzi (1975)
  - Il secondo tragico Fantozzi (1976)
  - Fantozzi contro tutti (1980)
  - Fantozzi subisce ancora (1983)
  - Superfantozzi (1986)
  - Fantozzi va in pensione (1988)
  - Fantozzi alla riscossa (1990)
  - Fantozzi in paradiso (1993)
  - Fantozzi – Il ritorno (1996)
  - Fantozzi 2000 – La clonazione (1999)

==== Faq ====
- FAQ: Frequently Asked Questions (2004)

==== Far ====
- Far from the Apple Tree (2019)
- Far and Away (1992)
- Far Away Lands (2017)
- Far Away and Long Ago (1978)
- Far Away Love (1947)
- Far from Bashar (2020)
- Far Beyond the Pasturelands (2021)
- Far Cry (2008)
- Far East (1982)
- Far East Deep South (2020)
- Far from Erin's Isle (1912)
- Far Far Away (2021)
- Far Harbor (1996)
- Far Haven (2023)
- Far from Heaven (2002)
- Far from Home: (1975 & 1989)
- Far from Home: The Adventures of Yellow Dog (1995)
- Far from the Madding Crowd: (1915, 1967, 1998 & 2015)
- Far Marfa (2013)
- Far from Men (2014)
- Far from Moscow (1950)
- Far from the Motherland (1960)
- Far North: (1988 & 2007)
- Far och flyg (1955)
- Far Out Isn't Far Enough: The Tomi Ungerer Story (2012)
- Far Out: Life On & After the Commune (2024)
- Far Out Man (1990)
- Far Side of The Moon (2003)
- Far skal giftes (1941)
- Far til fire med fuld musik (1961)
- Far from the Tree (2021)
- Far from the Trees (1972)
- Far from Vietnam (1967)
- Far from You Sweetheart (1976)
- Fara (1990)
- Faraaz (2023)
- Farah (2022)
- Farandole (1945)
- Faraway, So Close! (1993)
- Farce of the Penguins (2007)
- Fareb (1996)
- Farewell: (1930, 1983 & 2009)
- The Farewell: (2000 & 2019)
- Farewell Again (1937)
- Farewell Amor (2020)
- A Farewell to Arms: (1932 & 1957)
- Farewell Herr Schwarz (2014)
- A Farewell to Jinu (2015)
- Farewell to the King (1989)
- Farewell Love! (1943)
- Farewell Mister Grock (1950)
- Farewell My Concubine (1993)
- Farewell, My Lovely: (1944 & 1975)
- Farewell, My Queen (2012)
- Farewell Performance (1963)
- Farewell to St. Petersburg (1972)
- Farewell Waltz (1934)
- Farewells (1958)
- Fargo (1996)
- Farhana (2023)
- Farinelli (1994)
- Farishta Ya Qatil (1977)
- Farm House II (2014)
- The Farmer (1977)
- The Farmer Takes a Wife: (1935 & 1953)
- The Farmer's Daughter: (1928, 1940, 1947 & 1962 TV)
- Farmer's Daughters (1976)
- The Farmer's Wife: (1928 & 1941)
- Farsighted for Two Diopters (1976)
- Farz: (1967 & 2001)

==== Fas–Faz ====
- The Fascinating Mrs. Francis (1909)
- Fascinating Youth (1926)
- Fascination: (1922, 1931, 1979 & 2004)
- Fascination Amour (1999)
- The Fascination of the Fleur de Lis (1915)
- Fascination: Portrait of a Lady (1977)
- The Fascist (1961)
- Fasel Men El Lahazat El Lazeeza (2024)
- Fashion (2008)
- Fashion 99 (1987)
- Fashion Designer s/o Ladies Tailor (2017)
- Fashion King (2014)
- Fashion Madness (1928)
- Fashion Model (1945)
- Fashion Row (1923)
- Fashion Story: Model (2012)
- Fashion Victims (2007)
- Fashionable Fakers (1923)
- Fashionistas (2002)
- Fashions of 1934 (1934)
- Fashions in Love (1929)
- Fashions for Women (1927)
- Fassbinder's Women (2000)
- Fast Break (1979)
- Fast Bullets (1936)
- Fast Charlie (2023)
- Fast Charlie... the Moonbeam Rider (1979)
- Fast, Cheap & Out of Control (1997)
- Fast Color (2018)
- Fast Company: (1918, 1924, 1929, 1938, 1953 & 1979)
- Fast on the Draw (1950)
- The Fast Express (1924)
- Fast and Fearless (1924)
- Fast and Feel Love (2022)
- Fast Fightin' (1925)
- Fast Film (2003)
- Fast Food: (1989 & 1998)
- Fast Food Fast Women (2000)
- Fast Food Nation (2006)
- Fast Forward (1985)
- Fast Freight (1929)
- The Fast Freight (1921)
- Fast Friends (1979 TV)
- Fast and Furious: (1927 & 1939)
- The Fast and the Furious (1954)
- The Fast and the Furious series:
  - The Fast and the Furious (2001)
  - 2 Fast 2 Furious (2003)
  - The Fast and the Furious: Tokyo Drift (2006)
  - Fast & Furious (2009)
  - Fast Five (2011)
  - Fast & Furious 6 (2013)
  - Furious 7 (2015)
  - The Fate of the Furious (2017)
  - F9 (2021)
  - Fast X (2023)
- Fast and Furry-ous (1949)
- Fast Getaway (1991)
- Fast Getaway II (1994)
- Fast Girls (2012)
- Fast Gun (1988)
- Fast Horse (2018)
- The Fast Lady (1962)
- Fast Life: (1929 & 1932)
- Fast and Loose: (1930, 1939 & 1954)
- The Fast Mail (1922)
- The Fast Set (1924)
- Fast Sofa (2001)
- The Fast Sword (1971)
- Fast Talking (1984)
- Fast Times at Ridgemont High (1982)
- Fast Track: No Limits (2008)
- Fast Train (1988)
- The Fast Worker (1924)
- Fast Workers (1933)
- Fast-Walking (1982)
- Fasten Your Seatbelt (2013)
- Fasten Your Seatbelts (2014)
- Faster: (2003 & 2010)
- Faster Fene (2017)
- A Faster Horse (2015)
- Faster, Pussycat! Kill! Kill! (1965)
- Fastest (2011)
- The Fastest Guitar Alive (1967)
- The Fastest Gun Alive (1956)
- Fastest with the Mostest (1960)
- The Fastest Sword (1968)
- Fasthand (1973)
- Fat Albert (2004)
- Fat, Bald, Short Man (2012)
- Fat Choi Spirit (2002)
- Fat City (1972)
- Fat Girl (2001)
- Fat Man and Little Boy (1989)
- Fat People (2009)
- Fat Pizza (2003)
- Fat Pizza vs. Housos (2014)
- Fat Slags (2004)
- Fat, Sick & Nearly Dead (2010)
- Fata Morgana: (1965, 1971 & 2007)
- Fatal Attraction (1987)
- Fatal Beauty (1987)
- Fatal Fury 2: The New Battle (1993)
- Fatal Fury: Legend of the Hungry Wolf (1994)
- Fatal Fury: The Motion Picture (1994)
- Fatal Instinct (1993)
- Fatal Intuition (2015)
- Fatale (2020)
- Fate: (1913, 2001 & 2008)
- Fate series:
  - Fate/stay night: Unlimited Blade Works (2010)
  - Fate/Grand Order: First Order (2016 TV)
  - Fate/kaleid liner Prisma Illya: Vow in the Snow (2017)
  - Fate/stay night: Heaven's Feel I. presage flower (2017)
  - Fate/stay night: Heaven's Feel II. lost butterfly (2019)
  - Fate/stay night: Heaven's Feel III. spring song (2020)
  - Fate/Grand Order: Final Singularity-Grand Temple of Time: Solomon (2021)
- The Fate of Lee Khan (1973)
- Fateless (2005)
- Father: (1966, 1990, 2000, 2007 & 2011)
- The Father: (1979, 1996, 2019 & 2020)
- Father & Soldier (2023)
- Father of the Bride: (1950, 1991 & 2022)
- Father of the Bride Part II (1995)
- Father Brown (1954)
- Father Christmas (1991)
- Father Christmas Is Back (2021)
- Father Figures (2017)
- Father Goose (1964)
- Father of My Children (2009)
- Father Sergius (1917)
- Father Stu (2022)
- Father of the Year (2018)
- Father's Day: (1930, 1996, 1997, 2011 & 2012)
- Father's Little Dividend (1951)
- Fatherland: (1986 & 1994 TV)
- Fathom: (1967 & 2021)
- Fatima: (1938, 2015 & 2020)
- Fatman (2020)
- Fatty Finn (1980)
- Fatty and Mabel Adrift (1916)
- Fatty's Tintype Tangle (1915)
- Fatwa: (2006 & 2018)
- Fauci (2021)
- Faust: (1926, 1960, 1994 & 2011)
- Faust: Love of the Damned (2001)
- Fausto (2018)
- Le fauteuil (2009)
- The Favor: (1994 & 2006)
- The Favorite: (1935, 1976 & 1989)
- Favoriten (2024)
- Favorites of the Moon (1984)
- The Favourite (2018)
- Fay Grim (2006)
- Faya Dayi (2021)
- Fazil (1928)

=== Fb–Ff ===
- The FBI Story (1959)
- FDR: American Badass! (2012)
- Fear: (1917, 1946, 1954, 1990, 1996, 2020 & 2023)
- The Fear: (1966, 1995 & 2015)
- Fear of a Black Hat (1994)
- Fear Below (2025)
- Fear and Desire (1953)
- Fear Is the Key (1972)
- Fear and Loathing in Las Vegas (1998)
- Fear Me Not (2008)
- Fear in the Night: (1947 & 1972)
- Fear No Evil: (1945, 1969 TV & 1981)
- Fear of Rain (2021)
- Fear Street series:
  - Fear Street Part One: 1994 (2021)
  - Fear Street Part Two: 1978 (2021)
  - Fear Street Part Three: 1666 (2021)
  - Fear Street: Prom Queen (2025)
- Fear and Trembling (2003)
- Fear X (2003)
- FeardotCom (2002)
- Fearless: (1993 & 2006)
- The Fearless Hyena (1979)
- The Fearless Vampire Killers (1967)
- Feast: (2014 & 2021)
- Feast series:
  - Feast (2005)
  - Feast 2: Sloppy Seconds (2008)
  - Feast III: The Happy Finish (2009)
- The Feast (2021)
- Feast of July (1995)
- Feast of Love (2007)
- Feast of the Seven Fishes (2018)
- Fedora: (1913, 1918, 1926, 1942 & 1978)
- Feds (1988)
- Feed: (2005 & 2017)
- Feed Me (2013)
- Feeders (1996)
- Feeling Minnesota (1996)
- Feeling Randy (2024)
- Feet of Clay: (1960 & 2007)
- Feet First (1930)
- Felicia's Journey (1999)
- Felicity (1978)
- Felicity: An American Girl Adventure (2005 TV)
- Fellers (1930)
- Fellini Satyricon (1969)
- Fellini's Casanova (1977)
- The Female Brain (2017)
- Female Convict Scorpion: Jailhouse 41 (1972)
- The Female Highwayman (1906)
- Female Trouble (1974)
- Female Vampire (1973)
- Femme Fatale: (1991 & 2002)
- La Femme Nikita (1990)
- Feminism WTF (2023)
- The Fencer (2015)
- Fences (2016)
- Fengming, a Chinese Memoir (2007)
- Ferdinand (2017)
- FernGully: The Last Rainforest (1992)
- FernGully 2: The Magical Rescue (1998)
- Ferris Bueller's Day Off (1986)
- Ferry Tales (2003)
- Festen (1998)
- Festival: (1967, 1996, 2001 & 2005)
- Festival in Cannes (2001)
- Festival Express (2003)
- Fetih 1453 (2012)
- Fetters (1961)
- Feu Mathias Pascal (1925)
- The Feud: (1910 & 1919)
- A Feud in the Kentucky Hills (1912)
- Feud of the Range (1939)
- Feud of the West (1936)
- Fever Lake (1996)
- Fever Pitch: (1985, 1997 & 2005)
- A Few Good Men (1992)
- Ffolkes (1979)

=== Fi ===
==== Fia–Fif ====
- Fiancée for Hire (1950)
- Fiat Lux (1923)
- Fib the Truth (2021)
- Ficció (2006)
- Fickle Fatty's Fall (1915)
- Fiction (2006)
- Fiction and Other Truths: A Film About Jane Rule (1995)
- Fidaa: (2017 & 2018)
- Fiddle (2010)
- Fiddler on the Roof (1971)
- Fiddler: A Miracle of Miracles (2019)
- Fiddlers Three: (1944 & 1948)
- Fiddlesticks: (1927 & 1930)
- Fidel: (2002 & 2009)
- Fidel: The Untold Story (2001)
- Fidelio: Alice's Odyssey (2014)
- Fidelity: (2000 & 2019)
- Fido (2006)
- Fiebre (1971)
- Fiebre de amor (1985)
- Fiebre de juventud (1966)
- Fiebre de primavera (1965)
- Field of Dreams (1989)
- A Field in England (2013)
- Field of Honor: (1986 & 1987)
- Field of Lost Shoes (2014)
- Field Niggas (2015)
- Fields of Sacrifice (1964)
- Fiend (1980)
- Fiend of Dope Island (1961)
- Fiend Without a Face (1958)
- The Fiendish Plot of Dr. Fu Manchu (1980)
- Fierce Creatures (1997)
- Fierce People (2005)
- Fierro (2007)
- Fierrot le pou (1990)
- Fiery Fireman (1928)
- Fiery Summer (1939)
- Fiesta: (1941 & 1947)
- Fiesta Fiasco (1967)
- Fiestapatria (2007)
- Fiete im Netz (1958)
- Fietje Peters, Poste Restante (1935)
- Fietsen naar de Maan (1963)
- Fiffty Fiffty (1981)
- Fifi Blows Her Top (1958)
- Fifteen and Pregnant (1998 TV)
- Fifteen Wives (1934)
- Fifth Avenue (1926)
- Fifth Avenue Girl (1939)
- Fifth Avenue Models (1925)
- The Fifth Cord (1971)
- The Fifth Element (1997)
- The Fifth Estate (2013)
- The Fifth Horseman Is Fear (1965)
- The Fifth Missile (1986 TV)
- The Fifth of November (2018)
- The Fifth Wave (2016)
- Fifth Ward (1997)
- Fifty (2015)
- Fifty Candles (1921)
- Fifty Dead Men Walking (2008)
- Fifty Fathoms Deep: (1931 & 1932)
- Fifty-Fifty: (1916, 1925 & 1971)
- Fifty/Fifty (1992)
- Fifty Million Frenchmen (1931)
- Fifty Pills (2006)
- Fifty Roads to Town (1937)
- Fifty Shades series:
  - Fifty Shades of Grey (2015)
  - Fifty Shades Darker (2017)
  - Fifty Shades Freed (2018)
- Fifty Shades of Black (2016)

==== Fig ====
- A Fig Leaf for Eve (1944)
- Fig Leaves (1926)
- Fig Tree (2018)
- Fig Trees (2009)
- Figaro (1929)
- Figaro Here, Figaro There (1950)
- Figaro and His Great Day (1931)
- Figght (2019)
- Fight for '84 (TBD)
- Fight Back to School series:
  - Fight Back to School (1991)
  - Fight Back to School II (1992)
  - Fight Back to School III (1993)
- Fight Batman Fight! (1973)
- Fight Club (1999)
- Fight Club – Members Only (2006)
- Fight for the Dardanelles (1915)
- A Fight to the Finish: (1925 & 1937)
- Fight or Flight (2007 & 2025)
- Fight Girl (2018)
- A Fight for Honor (1924)
- Fight It Out (1920)
- Fight Lah! Kopitiam (2020)
- Fight Life (2012)
- Fight for Life (1987)
- A Fight for Love (1919)
- Fight for Nanjing, Shanghai and Hangzhou (1999)
- Fight Night (2009)
- Fight for the Planet (2009)
- Fight of the Tertia: (1929 & 1952)
- Fight That Ghost (1946)
- Fight for Us (1989)
- Fight Valley (2016)
- Fight to Win (1987)
- Fight for Your Life (1977)
- Fight for Your Lady (1937)
- Fight, Zatoichi, Fight (1964)
- Fighter in the Wind (2004)
- The Fighter: (1921, 1952 & 2010)
- Fighter: (2000, 2007 & 2012)
- A Fighter's Blues (2000)
- Fighter's Paradise (1924)
- The Fighters (1974)
- Fighters (2014)
- Fighting: (2009 & 2014)
- The Fighting 69th (1940)
- A Fighting Choice (1986 TV)
- A Fighting Colleen (1919)
- Fighting Elegy (1966)
- A Fighting Heart (1924)
- The Fighting Kentuckian (1949)
- A Fighting Man (2014)
- Fighting with My Family (2019)
- The Fighting Prince of Donegal (1966)
- The Fighting Seabees (1944)
- The Fighting Sullivans (1944)
- The Fighting Temptations (2003)
- Figures in a Landscape (1970)

==== Fij–Fil ====
- Fiji Love (2014)
- Filantropica (2002)
- File 13 (2010)
- File 113 (1933)
- The File of the Golden Goose (1969)
- Filhaal (2002)
- Filibus (1915)
- Filipinas (2003)
- Fill Me with Life (2000)
- Fill the Void (2012)
- Filling His Own Shoes (1917)
- Fillmore (1972)
- Film (1965)
- Film, Film, Film (1968)
- Film Geek (2005)
- Film Geek (2023)
- Film Portrait (1970)
- Film Stars Don't Die in Liverpool (2017)
- A Film Unfinished (2010)
- Film Without a Title (1948)
- Filmed in Supermarionation (2014)
- Filming Othello (1978 TV)
- Filmlovers! (2024)
- Filmmaker (1968)
- Filmpje! (1995)
- Filmworker (2017)
- Filth (2013)
- Filth City (2017)
- The Filth and the Fury (2000)
- Filth: The Mary Whitehouse Story (2008 TV)
- Filth and Wisdom (2008)
- Filthy Gorgeous: The Bob Guccione Story (2013)

==== Fin ====
- Fin: (2021 & 2023)
- Final (2001)
- The Final (2010)
- Final Accord: (1938 & 1960)
- Final Account (2020)
- Final Analysis (1992)
- Final Approach: (1991 & 2007 TV)
- Final Assignment (1980)
- The Final Close-Up (1919)
- Final Combination (1994)
- The Final Comedown (1972)
- The Final Countdown (1980)
- Final Curtain (1957 TV)
- The Final Curtain (2002)
- Final Cut: (1980 & 1998)
- The Final Cut (2004)
- Final Cut of Director (2008)
- Final Cut: Ladies and Gentlemen (2012)
- A Final Cut for Orson (2018)
- The Final Days: (1989 TV & 2000)
- Final Days of Planet Earth (2006 TV)
- Final Descent (1997 TV)
- Final Destination series:
  - Final Destination (2000)
  - Final Destination 2 (2003)
  - Final Destination 3 (2006)
  - The Final Destination (2009)
  - Final Destination 5 (2011)
  - Final Destination Bloodlines (2025)
- Final Draft (2007)
- The Final Edition (1932)
- The Final Encounter (1953)
- Final Exam: (1981 & 2017)
- Final Examination (2003)
- The Final Executioner (1984)
- The Final Exit (2017)
- The Final Extra (1927)
- Final Fantasy series:
  - Final Fantasy: Legend of the Crystals (1994)
  - Final Fantasy: The Spirits Within (2001)
  - Final Fantasy VII Advent Children (2005)
  - Last Order: Final Fantasy VII (2005)
  - Kingsglaive: Final Fantasy XV (2015)
- The Final Fix (2020)
- Final Flesh (2009)
- The Final Game: (1998 & 2022)
- Final Girl (2015)
- The Final Girls (2015)
- The Final Hour (1936)
- Final Impact (1992)
- The Final Impulse (1914)
- The Final Inch (2009)
- Final Jeopardy: (1985 TV & 2001 TV)
- The Final Journey (2010)
- The Final Judgement (1992)
- Final Judgment (1992)
- The Final Judgment (1915)
- Final Justice: (1985, 1988, & 1997)
- The Final Lesson (2015)
- The Final Mask (1924)
- The Final Master (2015)
- Final Mission: (1984 & 2013)
- Final Offer (1985)
- The Final Option (1994)
- Final Pardon (1952)
- The Final Patient (2005)
- The Final Payment (1917)
- Final Portrait (2017)
- The Final Programme (1973)
- The Final Project (2015)
- The Final Quarter (2019)
- Final Recipe (2013)
- A Final Reckoning (1928)
- Final Reprisal (1988)
- Final Romance (2001)
- Final Run (1999 TV)
- The Final Sacrifice (1990)
- The Final Sanction (1990)
- Final Score: (2007 & 2018)
- The Final Season (2007)
- Final Set (2020)
- Final Shot: The Hank Gathers Story (1992 TV)
- Final Solution: (2001 & 2004)
- The Final Storm (2010)
- Final Straw: Food, Earth, Happiness (2015)
- Final Take (1986)
- The Final Terror (1983)
- The Final Test (1953)
- Final Verdict (1991 TV)
- Final Victory (1987)
- Final Voyage (1999)
- The Final Winter (2007)
- The Final Wish (2018)
- The Final Year (2017)
- Finale (2009)
- Finalement (2024)
- Finality of Dusk (2023)
- Finally! (1941)
- Finally Bhalobasha (2019)
- Finally Dawn (2023)
- Finally Found Someone (2017)
- Finalmente la felicità (2011)
- Finals (2019)
- Finch (2021)
- Find Me Falling (2024)
- Find Me Guilty (2006)
- Finder's Fee (2001)
- Finding Forrester (2000)
- Finding Nemo series:
  - Finding Nemo (2003)
  - Finding Dory (2016)
- Finding Neverland (2004)
- Finding 'Ohana (2021)
- Finding Vivian Maier (2013)
- Finding You (2021)
- The Fine Art of Love (2005)
- The Fine Feathers (1912)
- A Fine Madness (1966)
- A Fine Mess (1986)
- A Fine Pair (1968)
- A Fine Romance (1991)
- A Fine, Windy Day (1980)
- The Finest Hours: (1964 & 2016)
- The Finger of Justice (1918)
- The Finger Points (1931)
- Fingers: (1941 & 1978)
- Finian's Rainbow (1968)
- The Finished People (2003)
- The Finishers (2013)
- The Finishing Line (1977)
- The Finishing Touch (1928)
- Finn on the Fly (2008)
- Finn and Hattie (1931)
- Finn's Girl (2007)
- Finnegan's Ball (1927)
- Finnegan's Foursome (2026)
- Finnick (2022)
- The Finnish Line (2024 TV)
- A Finnish Summer with Turisas (2008)
- Finzan (1989)
- The Finzi Detective Agency (1979)

==== Fio ====
- Fiore (2016)
- Fioretta (2023)
- Fiori, Fiori, Fiori (2020)
- Fiorina la vacca (1973)

==== Fir ====
- F. I. R. (1999)
- The Fire: (1916 & 2015)
- Fire: (1996, 2002 & 2020)
- Fire!: (1901, 1977 TV & 1991)
- Fire Birds (1990)
- Fire Down Below: (1957 & 1997)
- Fire Festival (1985)
- Fire Fighters (1922)
- Fire with Fire: (1986 & 2012)
- Fire and Ice: (1983 & 1986)
- Fire and Ice: The Dragon Chronicles (2008 TV)
- Fire and Ice: The Winter War of Finland and Russia (2005)
- Fire Island (2022)
- Fire of Love: (1925, 1967 & 2022)
- Fire Maidens from Outer Space (1956)
- Fire on the Mountain: (1981 & 1996)
- Fire Over England (1937)
- Fire Sale (1977)
- Fire in the Sky (1993)
- The Fire Within (1963)
- Fireball 500 (1966)
- Firebird (2021)
- The Firebird: (1934 & 1952)
- Firebreather (2010 TV)
- Firecreek (1968)
- Fired Up! (2009)
- Fireflies in the Garden (2008)
- Firefox (1982)
- Firehouse: (1987 & 1997)
- Firehouse Dog (2007)
- Firelight: (1964 & 1998)
- The Fireman: (1916 & 1931)
- Fireman (2015)
- The Firemen's Ball (1967)
- Fireproof (2008)
- Fires on the Plain: (1959 & 2014)
- Fires Were Started (1943)
- Firestarter: (1984 & 2022)
- Firestorm: (1998 & 2013)
- Firewalker (1986)
- Firewall (2006)
- Firewater (1994)
- Fire!: (1901, 1977 & 1991)
- The Firm: (1989 TV, 1993 & 2009)
- The First $20 Million Is Always the Hardest (2002)
- First Ball (1941)
- The First Beautiful Thing (2010)
- First Blood (1982)
- The First Born: (1921 & 1928)
- First Born (2007)
- First Cow (2019)
- First Daughter: (1999 TV & 2004)
- First Descent (2005)
- The First Film (2015)
- The First Great Train Robbery (1978)
- First Knight (1995)
- First Love, Last Rites (1997)
- First Man (2018)
- First Man into Space (1959)
- First of May: (1958 & 2015)
- The First of May (1998)
- The First Men in the Moon: (1919 & 1964)
- The First Monday in May (2016)
- First Monday in October (1981)
- First on the Moon (2005)
- First Name: Carmen (1983)
- The First Omen (2024)
- The First Purge (2018)
- First Reformed (2017)
- First Spaceship on Venus (1962)
- First Sunday (2008)
- First They Killed My Father (2017)
- The First Time: (1952, 1969 & 2012)
- First Time (2012)
- The First Wave (2021)
- The First Wives Club (1996)
- Firstborn (1984)

==== Fis–Fiu ====
- Fish Above Sea Level (2011)
- A Fish in the Bathtub (1999)
- A Fish Called Wanda (1988)
- Fish n' Chips (2011)
- Fish and Elephant (2001)
- Fish Fry (1944)
- Fish Hawk (1979)
- Fish Hooky (1933)
- Fish Meat (2012)
- Fish Out of Water: (1993, 2009 & 2023)
- Fish Story (2009)
- Fish Tales (1936)
- Fish Tank (2009)
- Fish War (2024)
- Fishbone (2021)
- Fisher Folks (1911)
- The Fisher King (1991)
- Fisher's Ghost (1924)
- Fisherman's Friends (2019)
- Fisherman's Friends: One and All (2022)
- Fisherman's Wharf (1939)
- Fishin' Around (1931)
- Fishing Without Nets: (2012 & 2014)
- Fissures (2009)
- Fist & Faith (2017)
- Fist of Fear, Touch of Death (1980)
- Fist Fight (2017)
- Fist to Fist (1973)
- Fist of Fury (1972)
- Fist of Fury II (1977)
- Fist of Fury III (1979)
- Fist of Fury 1991 (1991)
- Fist of Fury 1991 II (1992)
- Fist of Legend (1994)
- Fist of the North Star: (1986 & 1995)
- Fist of the Warrior (2009)
- A Fistful of Dollars (1964)
- A Fistful of Dynamite (1971)
- A Fistful of Fingers (1995)
- Fistful of Vengeance (2022)
- Fists of Bruce Lee (1979)
- Fists of Legend (2013)
- Fists in the Pocket (1965)
- Fists of Fury (1971)
- Fit (2010)
- Fit to Fight (1919)
- Fit to Kill (1993)
- Fit Lover (2008)
- Fitna (2008)
- Fitness Tour (1997)
- Fitoor (2016)
- The Fits (2015)
- Fits and Starts (2017)
- A Fitting Tribute (2007)
- Fitzcarraldo (1982)
- The Fitzgerald Family Christmas (2012)
- Fitzwilly (1967)
- Fiume o morte! (2025)

==== Fiv–Fiz ====
- Five: (1951, 1964, 2003, 2011 & 2016)
- Five Aces (1999)
- Five Across the Eyes (2006)
- Five Anxious Days (1928)
- Five Ashore in Singapore (1967)
- Five Bad Men (1935)
- Five Blind Dates (2024)
- Five Bloody Graves (1969)
- Five Bottles of Vodka (2001)
- Five Boys from Barska Street (1954)
- Five Branded Women (1960)
- Five Breakups and a Romance (2023)
- Five Brides (2011)
- Five Bumpkins (1974)
- Five Came Back (1939)
- Five Cartridges (1960)
- Five Children and It (2004)
- Five Cities (2010)
- Five Corners (1987)
- Five Dances (2013)
- Five Day Lover (1961)
- Five Days (1954)
- The Five Days (1973)
- Five Days, Five Nights: (1960 & 1996)
- Five Days from Home (1978)
- Five Days to Live (1922)
- Five Days One Summer (1982)
- Five Deadly Venoms (1978)
- Five Desperate Women (1971 TV)
- Five Dollars a Day (2008)
- Five Dolls for an August Moon (1970)
- Five Easy Pieces (1970)
- Five Elements Ninjas (1982)
- Five Evenings (1978)
- Five Faces of Woman (1947)
- Five Feet Apart (2019)
- Five Finger Exercise (1962)
- Five Fingers: (2005 & 2006)
- Five Fingers for Marseilles (2017)
- Five Gates to Hell (1959)
- Five Girls (2006)
- Five Golden Dragons (1967)
- Five Golden Flowers (1959)
- Five Golden Hours (1961)
- Five Graves to Cairo (1943)
- Five Guns to Tombstone (1960)
- Five Guns West (1955)
- The Five Heartbeats (1991)
- Five for Hell (1969)
- Five Hours from Paris (2009)
- Five Hundred Miles (2023)
- Five Killers (2009)
- The Five Man Army (1969)
- Five Marines (1961)
- Five Miles to Midnight (1962)
- Five Million Look for an Heir (1938)
- Five Minarets in New York (2010)
- Five Minutes of Heaven (2009)
- Five Minutes to Live (1961)
- Five Minutes of Love (1941)
- Five Minutes to Tomorrow (2014)
- Five Moons Square (2003)
- Five Nights at Freddy's (2023)
- Five Nights at Freddy's 2 (2025)
- Five Nights in Maine (2015)
- The Five Obstructions (2003)
- The Five Pennies (1959)
- Five Red Tulips (1949)
- Five Roads to Freedom: From Apartheid to the World Cup (2010 TV)
- Five Scouts (1938)
- Five Star Final (1931)
- The Five Year Engagement (2012)
- Fix (2008)
- The Fix (1997)
- Fixed (2025)
- Fixed Bayonets! (1951)
- Fiza (2000)

=== Fj ===
- Fjols til fjells (1957)
- Fjord (2026)

=== Fl ===
==== Fla ====
- Flachsmann the Educator (1930)
- Flag Day (2021)
- The Flag: A Story Inspired by the Tradition of Betsy Ross (1927)
- Flag Wars (2003)
- Flags of Our Fathers (2006)
- Flagpole Jitters (1956)
- Flakes (2007)
- Flame (1975)
- Flame (1996)
- Flame of Araby (1951)
- Flame of the Argentine (1926)
- The Flame and the Arrow (1950)
- Flame of Barbary Coast (1945)
- Flame of Calcutta (1953)
- Flame & Citron (2008)
- Flame of the Desert (1919)
- Flame and the Flesh (1954)
- Flame in the Heather (1935)
- Flame of the Islands (1956)
- Flame of My Love (1949)
- Flame of Passion (1915)
- Flame Over Vietnam (1957)
- Flame of Stamboul (1951)
- Flame in the Streets (1961)
- Flame Top (1980)
- Flame in the Valley (1967)
- Flame of the West (1945)
- Flame of Youth (1920)
- Flame of Youth (1940)
- The Flame of Youth (1917)
- Flaming Star (1960)
- The Flamingo Kid (1984)
- Flamingo Road (1949)
- Flap (1970)
- Flarsky (2019)
- The Flash (2023)
- Flash of Genius (2008)
- Flash Gordon: (1936 & 1980)
- Flash Gordon Conquers the Universe (1940)
- Flash Gordon's Trip to Mars (1938)
- Flashback: (1969 & 1990)
- Flashbacks of a Fool (2008)
- Flashdance (1983)
- The Flat: (1921, 1968 & 2011)
- Flatland (2007)
- Flatland: The Movie (2007)
- Flatland 2: Sphereland (2012)
- Flatliners: (1990 & 2017)
- Flat! (2010)
- The Flavor of Corn (1986)
- The Flavor of Green Tea over Rice (1952)
- The Flaw: (1933 & 1955)
- Flawless: (1999 & 2008)

==== Fle ====
- The Flea Circus (1954)
- A Flea in Her Ear (1943)
- A Flea in Her Ear (1968)
- A Flea on the Scales (1953)
- Flea-picking Samurai (2018)
- Flecha de oro (1940)
- Fled (1996)
- Die Fledermaus (1923)
- Flee (2021)
- Fleeing the Trap (1971)
- The Fleet That Came to Stay (1945)
- Fleet of Time (2014)
- The Fleet's In (1928)
- The Fleet's In (1942)
- A Fleeting Encounter (2022)
- Fleetwing (1928)
- Fleisch (1979)
- The Flemish Farm (1943)
- Flemish Heaven (2016)
- The Flesh (1991)
- Flesh (1932)
- Flesh (1968)
- Flesh for the Beast (2003)
- Flesh and Blood (1922)
- Flesh and Blood (1951)
- Flesh and Blood (1968) (TV)
- Flesh and Blood (1985)
- Flesh and Blood (2017)
- The Flesh and Blood Show (1972)
- Flesh and Bone (1993)
- Flesh and Bullets (1985)
- The Flesh Commands (1948)
- Flesh and the Devil (1927)
- The Flesh Eaters (1964)
- Flesh and Fantasy (1943)
- Flesh Feast (1970)
- The Flesh and the Fiends (1960)
- Flesh for Frankenstein (1973)
- Flesh and Fuel (2026)
- Flesh and Fury (1952)
- Flesh of the Gods (TBD)
- Flesh Gordon (1974)
- Flesh Gordon Meets the Cosmic Cheerleaders (1989)
- The Flesh Is Weak (1957)
- Flesh Market (1962)
- Flesh and Sand (2017)
- Flesh and Spirit (1922)
- Flesh and the Spur (1956)
- Flesh Will Surrender (1947)
- Flesh and the Woman (1954)
- Flesheater (1988)
- Fleshtone (1994)
- Fletch (1985)
- Fletch Lives (1989)
- Fleur (TBD)
- Flexing with Monty (2010)

==== Fli ====
- Flic Story (1975)
- Flick (2000)
- Flick (2008)
- Flicka series:
  - Flicka (2006)
  - Flicka 2 (2010)
  - Flicka: Country Pride (2012)
- Flicka i kasern (1955)
- Flickan från Paradiset (1924)
- Flickan från Värmland (1931)
- Flicker (2008)
- The Flicker (1966)
- Flickering Lights (2000)
- Flicks (1981)
- Fliers of the Open Skies (1977)
- Flies (2023)
- Flies (2026)
- Flight (1929)
- Flight (2009)
- Flight (2012)
- Flight (2021)
- Flight 6 (1944)
- Flight 90: Disaster on the Potomac (1984) (TV)
- Flight 93 (2006) (TV)
- Flight 175: As the World Watched (2006) (TV)
- Flight 222 (1985)
- Flight 404 (2024)
- Flight of the Albatross (1996)
- Flight Angels (1940)
- Flight Around the World (1925)
- Flight from Ashiya (1964)
- Flight of Black Angel (1991) (TV)
- Flight of the Butterflies (2012)
- Flight Crew (2016)
- Flight from Death (2003)
- Flight from Destiny (1941)
- Flight of the Doves (1971)
- The Flight of Dragons (1982)
- Flight of the Eagle (1982)
- Flight to Fame (1938)
- Flight of Fancy (2000)
- Flight from Folly (1945)
- Flight for Freedom (1943)
- Flight of Fury (2007)
- Flight from Glory (1937)
- Flight to Hong Kong (1956)
- Flight of the Ibis (1996)
- Flight of the Innocent (1992)
- Flight to Mars (1951)
- Flight Into Nowhere (1938)
- Flight of the Intruder (1991)
- Flight Lieutenant (1942)
- Flight of the Living Dead: Outbreak on a Plane (2008)
- Flight of the Lost Balloon (1961)
- Flight to Mars (1951)
- Flight at Midnight (1939)
- Flight from the Millions (1934)
- Flight of the Navigator (1986)
- Flight North (1986)
- Flight to Nowhere (1946)
- Flight Nurse (1953)
- Flight from Paradise (1990)
- The Flight of the Phoenix: (1965 & 2004)
- Flight Plan (1950)
- Flight of the Raven (1984)
- Flight of the Red Balloon (2007)
- Flight of the Red Tail (2009)
- Flight Risk (2025)
- Flight from Singapore (1962)
- Flight to Tangier (1953)
- Flight from Vienna (1955)
- Flight of the White Wolf (1990)
- Flightplan (2005)
- Flights in Dreams and Reality (1983)
- Flim Flam Films (1927)
- The Flim-Flam Man (1967)
- Fling (2008)
- Fling in the Ring (1955)
- Flint (2017)
- Flintesønnerne (1956)
- The Flintstones series:
  - The Flintstones (1994)
  - A Flintstones Christmas Carol (1994)
  - The Flintstones in Viva Rock Vegas (2000)
  - The Flintstones: On the Rocks (2001)
  - The Flintstones & WWE: Stone Age SmackDown! (2015)
- Flipped (2010)
- Flipped (2015)
- Flipper: (1963 & 1996)
- Flipper's New Adventure (1964)
- Flipping Out (2007)
- Flipside (2023)
- Flirt (1983)
- Flirt (1995)
- Flirt (2025)
- The Flirt: (1917 & 1922)
- Flirtation (1927)
- Flirtation (1934)
- Flirtation Walk (1934)
- Flirting (1991)
- Flirting in the Air (2014)
- Flirting with Anthony (2005)
- Flirting with Danger (1934)
- Flirting with Death (1917)
- Flirting with Disaster (1996)
- Flirting with Fate (1916)
- Flirting with Fate (1938)
- Flirting with Forty (2008) (TV)
- The Flirting Husband (1912)
- Flirting with Love (1924)
- Flirting Scholar (1993)
- Flirting Scholar 2 (2010)
- Flirty Four-Flushers (1926)

==== Flo ====
- Float (2019)
- Float (2023)
- Float Like a Butterfly (2018)
- Floating (1997)
- Floating City (2012)
- Floating Clouds (1955)
- The Floating Dutchman (1952)
- Floating Life (1996)
- Floating Melon (2015)
- Floating Skyscrapers (2013)
- Floating Weeds (1959)
- The Flock (2007)
- Flock of Dodos (2006)
- The Floorwalker (1916)
- Flora (2017)
- Flora & Ulysses (2021)
- Florence Foster Jenkins (2016)
- The Florentine (1999)
- A Florida Enchantment (1914)
- A Florida Feud (1909)
- The Florida Project (2017)
- Flow (2024)
- Flower Drum Song (1961)
- The Flower of Evil (2003)
- Flower & Garnet (2002)
- The Flower Girl (1972)
- The Flower of My Secret (1995)
- Flower and Snake: Zero (2014)
- The Flower Woman of Potsdam Square (1925)
- Flowers in the Attic: (1987 & 2014)
- Flowers from Nice (1936)
- Flowers in the Shadows (2008)
- Flowers of Shanghai (1998)
- The Flowers of St. Francis (1950)
- Flowers and Trees (1932)
- The Flowers of War (2011)

==== Flu–Fly ====
- Flu (2013)
- Flu Bird Horror (2008) (TV)
- Flubber (1997)
- The Fluffer (2002)
- Fluffy (1965)
- Fluffy (2016)
- The Fluffy Movie (2014)
- Fluke (1995)
- Flunked (2008)
- Flunky, Work Hard! (1931)
- Flush (1977)
- Flushed (1999)
- Flushed Away (2006)
- The Flute and the Arrow (1957)
- The Flute Concert of Sanssouci (1930)
- Flutter (2006)
- Flutter (2011)
- Flux (2002)
- Flux Gourmet (2022)
- The Fly: (1958 & 1986)
- The Fly II (1989)
- Fly Away Home: (1996 & 2016)
- Fly Me to the Moon (2008)
- Fly-by-Night (1942)
- Flyboys (2006)
- Flying Boys (2004)
- The Flying Deuces (1939)
- Flying Disc Man from Mars (1950)
- Flying Down to Rio (1933)
- The Flying Dutchman: (1957, 1995 & 2000)
- Flying the Feathered Edge: The Bob Hoover Project (2014)
- The Flying Fool: (1925, 1929 & 1931)
- Flying from Justice (1915)
- The Flying Liftboy (1998)
- Flying Leathernecks (1951)
- The Flying Monster (1985)
- Flying with Music (1942)
- Flying Padre (1951)
- The Flying Squad: (1929, 1932 & 1940)
- Flying Squadron (1949)
- Flying Swords of Dragon Gate (2011)
- Flying Tigers (1942)
- Flying Wild (1941)
- Flynn (1996)
- Flyover (2021)
- Flypaper (1998)
- Flypaper (2011)
- Flyway of Life (2025)
- Flywheel (2003)

=== Fm ===
- FM (1978)

=== Fo ===
==== Foa–Fon ====
- Foam (2020)
- Focus: (2001 & 2015)
- Focus, Please! (1956)
- Fodder and Son (1957)
- Foe (2023)
- Foetus (1994)
- Fog: (1932 & 1933)
- The Fog: (1980 & 2005)
- Fog in August (2016)
- Fog Bound (1923)
- Fog City Mavericks (2007)
- Fog and Night (2007)
- Fog Over Frisco (1934)
- Fog and Sun (1951)
- The Fog of War: Eleven Lessons from the Life of Robert S. McNamara (2004)
- Fog Warning (2008)
- Foghorn (1952)
- Fogo (2012)
- Fogo de Palha (1926)
- Foil (2023)
- Folklore: The Long Pond Studio Sessions (2020)
- Folks! (1992)
- Follie di notte (1978)
- Follies Girl (1943)
- Follow the Band (1943)
- Follow the Boys: (1944 & 1963)
- Follow the Crowd (1918)
- Follow the Fleet (1936)
- Follow the Fox (2014)
- Follow the Girl (1917)
- Follow Kadri, Not Your Heart (2009)
- Follow the Lady (1933)
- Follow the Leader: (1930 & 1944)
- Follow the Legion (1942)
- Follow Me: (1989 & 2022)
- Follow Me! (1972)
- Follow Me Home (1996)
- Follow Me My Queen (2015)
- Follow Me Quietly (1949)
- Follow Me, Boys! (1966)
- Follow Me, Scoundrels (1964)
- Follow Me: The Yoni Netanyahu Story (2012)
- Follow the Prophet (2009)
- Follow the River (1995 TV)
- Follow a Star (1959)
- Follow the Star (1978)
- Follow the Stars Home (2001 TV)
- Follow the Sun (1951)
- Follow That Camel (1967)
- Follow That Dream (1962)
- Follow That Horse! (1960)
- Follow That Man: (1953 & 1961)
- Follow That Woman (1945)
- Follow Thru (1930)
- Follow Your Heart: (1936 & 1996)
- Follow Your Star (1938)
- Followed (2018)
- Followers (2000)
- Following (1998)
- Following Her Heart (1994 TV)
- Following Sean (2005)
- Folly to Be Wise (1953)
- Folly of Love (1928)
- Foma Gordeyev (1959)
- Fong Sai-yuk (1993)
- Fong Sai-yuk II (1993)
- Fontamara (1980)

==== Foo ====
- Food (1992)
- Food for Fighters (1943)
- The Food of the Gods (1976)
- Food of the Gods II (1989)
- Food, Inc. (2009)
- Food of Love: (1997 & 2002)
- Food and Magic (1943)
- Food for Scandal (1920)
- Food Stamped (2010)
- Food Will Win the War (1942)
- Foodfight! (2012)
- Foodland (2010)
- A Fool (2014)
- The Fool: (1913, 1925, 1990 & 2014)
- Fool Circle (2014)
- Fool Coverage (1952)
- A Fool and His Money: (1912, 1920, 1925 & 1989)
- Fool for Love: (1985 & 2010)
- Fool Moon (2016)
- A Fool There Was: (1914, 1915 & 1922)
- Fool's Gold: (1919, 1947 & 2008)
- Fool's Luck (1926)
- Fool's Mate: (1956 & 1989)
- Fool's Paradise (1921)
- Foolish (1999)
- Foolish Age (2013)
- Foolish Happiness (1929)
- Foolish Heart (1998)
- Foolish Plans (2016)
- Foolish Wives (1922)
- Foolishness of His Love (1929)
- Foolproof (2003)
- Fools (1970)
- Fools of Fashion (1926)
- Fools of Fate (1909)
- Fools First (1922)
- Fools of Fortune (1990)
- Fools Highway (1924)
- Fools for Luck (1928)
- Fools and Riches (1923)
- Fools Rush In: (1949, 1973 & 1997)
- Fools for Scandal (1938)
- Fools and Their Money (1919)
- Fools' Parade (1971)
- Football (1982)
- Football Days (2003)
- The Football Factory (2004)
- Football of the Good Old Days (1973)
- Football, Love, and Bullfighting (1929)
- Football Under Cover (2008)
- Footfalls (1921)
- Footlight Fever (1941)
- Footlight Glamour (1943)
- Footlight Parade (1933)
- Footlight Serenade (1942)
- Footlights (1921)
- Footlights and Fools (1929)
- Footloose: (1984 & 2011)
- Footloose Widows (1926)
- Footnote (2011)
- Footpads (1895)
- Footpath: (1953 & 2003)
- Footprint in the Ocean (1964)
- Footprints: (2011 & 2015)
- Footprints on the Moon: (1969 & 1975)
- Footrot Flats: The Dog's Tale (1986)
- Footskating 101 (2007)
- Footsteps (2003 TV)
- Footsteps in the Dark (1941)
- Footsteps in the Fog (1955)
- Footsteps in the Night (1957)
- Footsteps in the Sand (2010)
- Footsteps in the Snow (1966)
- Footy Legends (2006)

==== For ====
- For All Mankind (1989)
- For the Birds (2000)
- For Colored Girls (2010)
- For Eternal Hearts (2007)
- For a Few Bullets (2016)
- For a Few Dollars More (1965)
- For the First Time: (1959 & 2008)
- For a Good Time, Call... (2012)
- For Heaven's Sake: (1926, 1950 & 2008)
- For a Lost Soldier (1992)
- For the Love of Ada (1972)
- For Love or Country: The Arturo Sandoval Story (2000) (TV)
- For Love of the Game (1999)
- For Love or Money (1993)
- For Me and My Gal (1942)
- For No Good Reason (2012)
- For One Night (2006) (TV)
- For Queen and Country (1989)
- For Richer or Poorer (1997)
- For Sama (2019)
- For Scent-imental Reasons (1949)
- For Those in Peril: (1944 & 2013)
- For Those Who Think Young (1964)
- For Whom the Bell Tolls (1943)
- For Worse (2026)
- For Your Consideration (2006)
- For Your Eyes Only (1981)
- Forbidden: (1919, 1932, 1949, 1953 & 1984)
- The Forbidden Door (2009)
- Forbidden Dream (2019)
- Forbidden Dreams (1987)
- Forbidden Forest (2004)
- Forbidden Fruit: (1921, 1952, 1953, 2000 & 2009)
- Forbidden Fruits (2026)
- Forbidden Games (1952)
- The Forbidden Kingdom (2008)
- Forbidden Love: The Unashamed Stories of Lesbian Lives (1992)
- Forbidden Planet (1956)
- The Forbidden Room: (1914, 1977 & 2015)
- Forbidden Zone (1982)
- The Force (2019)
- Force 10 from Navarone (1978)
- Force of Evil (1948)
- Force Majeure (2014)
- Force of Nature (2020)
- Force of Nature: The Dry 2 (2024)
- A Force of One (1979)
- Forces of Nature: (1999 & 2004)
- Ford v Ferrari (2019)
- A Foreign Affair (1948)
- Foreign Correspondent (1940)
- A Foreign Field (1993) (TV)
- Foreign Intrigue (1956)
- The Foreigner: (2003 & 2017)
- Foreigners (1972)
- The Forest: (1953, 1982, 2002, 2005, 2009 & 2016)
- The Forest of Love (2019)
- The Forest of the Wolf (1970)
- Forever After (1926)
- Forever Amber (1947)
- Forever and a Day: (1943 & 2011)
- Forever Enthralled (2008)
- Forever Love: (2014 & 2015)
- Forever Mine (1999)
- Forever the Moment (2008)
- The Forever Purge (2021)
- Forever Young: (1992 & 2014)
- Forge (2026)
- The Forger: (1928, 2011 & 2014)
- Les Forgerons (1895)
- Forget All Remember (2014)
- Forget Paris (1995)
- Forgetting Sarah Marshall (2008)
- Forgive and Forget: (1923 & 2000 TV)
- The Forgiveness of Blood (2011)
- Forgotten: (1933, 2012 TV, 2013 & 2017)
- The Forgotten: (1973, 2003, 2004, 2014 & 2019)
- The Forgotten Battle (2020)
- The Forgotten Frontier (1931)
- Forgotten Island (2026)
- Forgotten Silver (1995)
- Forgotten We'll Be (2020)
- Forklift Driver Klaus – The First Day on the Job (2000)
- Formosa (2005)
- The Formula: (1980 & 2002)
- Formula 17 (2004)
- Formula 51 (2001)
- Forrest Gump (1994)
- The Forsaken (2001)
- Fort Apache (1948)
- Fort Saganne (1984)
- Fort Ti (1953)
- Fortress: (1985, 1992 & 2012)
- The Fortress: (1979, 1994, 2017 & 2022)
- Fortress 2: Re-Entry (1999)
- The Fortune (1975)
- The Fortune Cookie (1966)
- Fortune Favors the Brave (1908)
- Fortune Favors Lady Nikuko (2021)
- Fortune Is a Woman (1957)
- Forty Guns (1957)
- Forty Little Mothers: (1936 & 1940)
- Forty Shades of Blue (2005)
- Forty Thieves (1944)
- Forty Thousand Horsemen (1940)

==== Fos–Fox ====
- Fossil (2023)
- Foster (2011)
- The Foster Boy (2011)
- Foster Child: (1987 & 2007)
- Foster Daddy, Tora! (1980)
- The Foster Gang (1964)
- Foster and Laurie (1975 TV)
- Foster's Release (1971)
- Fotógrafo de señoras (1978)
- Fotonovela (2008)
- Fotos (1996)
- Fouetté (1986)
- The Foul King (2000)
- Foul Play: (1920, 1977 & 1978)
- Found: (2012 & 2021)
- Found Alive (1933)
- Found Footage 3D (2016)
- Found Memories (2011)
- The Founder (2016)
- Founders Day (2023)
- Foundry Town (1962)
- The Fountain (2006)
- Fountain of Trevi (1960)
- Fountain of Youth (2025)
- The Fountainhead (1949)
- Four: (2011 & 2012)
- Four Adventures of Reinette and Mirabelle (1987)
- Four of the Apocalypse (1975)
- Four Around a Woman (1921)
- Four Assassins (2011)
- Four Billion in Four Minutes (1976)
- Four Boxes (2009)
- Four Boys and a Gun (1957)
- Four Brothers (2005)
- Four Christmases (2008)
- Four Corners (2013)
- Four Daughters (1938)
- Four Days (1951)
- Four Days in July (1984 TV)
- Four Days in November (1964)
- Four Days in September (1997)
- Four Dogs Playing Poker (2000)
- Four Eyes and Six Guns (1992 TV)
- Four Faces of God (2002)
- Four Faces West (1948)
- Four Falls of Buffalo (2015)
- Four Fast Guns (1960)
- Four Feathers (1915)
- The Four Feathers: (1921, 1929, 1939 & 2002)
- Four First Nights (1990)
- Four Flies on Grey Velvet (1971)
- Four Friends: (1981 & 2010)
- Four Frightened People (1934)
- Four Girls from Hong Kong (1972)
- Four Girls in Town (1957)
- Four Girls in White (1939)
- Four Good Days (2020)
- Four Gunmen of the Holy Trinity (1971)
- Four Guns to the Border (1954)
- Four Hands (2011)
- Four Hands Dinner (1999)
- Four Hearts: (1939 & 1941)
- Four Hits and a Mister (1962)
- Four Horsemen (2012)
- The Four Horsemen of the Apocalypse (1921)
- The Four Horsemen of the Apocalypse (1962)
- Four Hours Before His Death (1953)
- Four Hours to Kill! (1935)
- Four Jacks (2001)
- Four Jacks and a Jill (1942)
- Four Jills in a Jeep (1944)
- Four Kids and It (2020)
- Four Last Songs (2007)
- Four Letter Words (2000)
- Four Lions (2010)
- Four Loves (1965)
- Four Mothers (1941)
- The Four Musketeers: (1934, 1936, 1963 & 1974)
- Four Nights of a Dreamer (1971)
- Four Rooms (1995)
- The Four Seasons: (1979 & 1981)
- Four Shades of Brown (2004)
- Four Sisters Before the Wedding (2020)
- Four Sisters and a Wedding (2013)
- Four for Venice (1998)
- Four Weddings and a Funeral (1994)
- Four Wives (1939)
- Four's a Crowd (1938)
- Fourteen (2019)
- Fourteen Hours (1951)
- The Fourteenth Man (1920)
- The Fourth Estate (1940)
- The Fourth Kind (2009)
- The Fourth Man: (1983 & 2007)
- Fowl Play (2026)
- Fowl Weather (1953)
- The Fox: (1921, 1967 & 2025)
- The Fox Family (2006)
- The Fox of Glenarvon (1940)
- Fox and His Friends (1976)
- The Fox and the Hound (1981)
- The Fox and the Hound 2 (2006)
- The Fox with Nine Tails (1994)
- Foxcatcher (2014)
- Foxes (1980)
- Foxfire: (1955, 1987 & 1996)
- Foxtrot: (1976 & 2017)
- The Foxtrot (1971 TV)
- Foxy Brown (1974)

=== Fp ===
- The FP (2011)
- FP2: Beats of Rage (2018)

=== Fr ===
==== Fra ====
- Fracchia contro Dracula (1985)
- Fracchia la belva umana (1981)
- Frackman (2015)
- Fracture: (2004 & 2007)
- Fractured: (2013 & 2019)
- Fractured Follies (1988)
- Fractured Land (2015)
- A Fractured Leghorn (1950)
- Fragile (2005)
- Fragile Storm (2015)
- A Fragile Trust (2013)
- Fragility (2016)
- Fragment of an Empire (1929)
- Fragment of Fear (1970)
- Fragments of Life (1929)
- Frailty: (1921 & 2001)
- The Frame (2014)
- Frame 394 (2016)
- Frame Up (1997)
- Framed: (1930, 1947, 1975 & 1990 TV)
- Frames of Reference (1960)
- Framing Britney Spears (2021 TV)
- Framing John DeLorean (2019)
- Framing Youth (1937)
- Fran (1985)
- Fran the Man (2025)
- Franca: Chaos and Creation (2016)
- France (2021)
- Frances (1982)
- Frances Ferguson (2019)
- Frances Ha (2013)
- Francesca (2009)
- Francesco: (1989 & 2020)
- Francheska: Prairie Queen (2022)
- Francia (2009)
- Francine (2012)
- Francis of Assisi (1961)
- Francis the First (1937)
- Francis the Talking Mule series:
  - Francis (1950)
  - Francis Goes to the Races (1951)
  - Francis Goes to West Point (1952)
  - Francis Covers the Big Town (1953)
  - Francis Joins the WACS (1954)
  - Francis in the Navy (1955)
  - Francis in the Haunted House (1956)
- Francisca (1981)
- Franco, Ciccio e il pirata Barbanera (1969)
- Frangipani (2016)
- Frank (2014)
- Frank & Ava (2018)
- Frank Duck Brings 'Em Back Alive (1946)
- Frank en Eva (1973)
- Frank Film (1973)
- Frank Gardiner, the King of the Road (1911)
- Frank Hansen's Fortune (1917)
- Frank & Lola (2016)
- Frank & Louis (TBD)
- Frankenfish (2004)
- Frankenhooker (1990)
- Frankenstein: (1910, 1973 TV, 1992 TV, 2004, 2007 TV, 2015 & 2025)
- Frankenstein series:
  - Frankenstein (1931)
  - Bride of Frankenstein (1935)
  - Son of Frankenstein (1939)
  - Ghost of Frankenstein (1942)
  - Frankenstein Meets the Wolf Man (1943)
  - House of Frankenstein (1944)
  - House of Dracula (1945)
  - Abbott and Costello Meet Frankenstein (1948)
- Frankenstein 1970 (1958)
- Frankenstein Conquers the World (1965)
- Frankenstein Created Woman (1967)
- Frankenstein and the Monster from Hell (1974)
- Frankenstein Must Be Destroyed (1969)
- Frankenstein Unbound (1990)
- Frankenstein: The True Story (1973) (TV)
- Frankenstein's Daughter (1958)
- Frankenweenie: (1984 & 2012)
- Frankie and Johnny: (1966 & 1991)
- Franklin and the Green Knight (2000)
- Franklin and the Turtle Lake Treasure (2006)
- Franklin's Magic Christmas (2001)
- Franklyn (2009)
- Frantic (1988)
- Frantz (2016)
- Franz (1971)
- Franz Schubert (1953)
- Frat House (1998)
- Fraternity Row (1977)
- Fraternity Vacation (1985)
- Frau im Mond (1929)
- Fraud (2016)
- Fraud Saiyaan (2019)
- Frauds (1993)
- Fray (2012)

==== Fre ====
- Freak (1998)
- Freak Talks About Sex (1999)
- Freaked (1993)
- Freakier Friday (2025)
- Freaks: (1932 & 2018)
- Freaks of Nature (2015)
- Freaks: You're One of Us (2020)
- Freakshow (2007)
- Freaky (2020)
- Freaky Friday: (1976, 1995 TV, 2003 & 2018 TV)
- Freaky Tales (2024)
- Freakdog (Red Mist) (2008)
- Fred (2014)
- Fred Claus (2007)
- Fred Ott's Sneeze (1894)
- Fred: The Movie series:
  - Fred: The Movie (2010)
  - Fred 2: Night of the Living Fred (2011)
  - Fred 3: Camp Fred (2012)
- Freddy Got Fingered (2001)
- Freddy's Dead: The Final Nightmare (1991)
- Free (2001)
- Free Birds (2013)
- Free Fire (2016)
- Free Guy (2021)
- Free Hand for a Tough Cop (1976)
- Free Solo (2018)
- A Free Soul (1931)
- Free Willy series:
  - Free Willy (1993)
  - Free Willy 2: The Adventure Home (1995)
  - Free Willy 3: The Rescue (1997)
  - Free Willy: Escape from Pirate's Cove (2010)
- Freebie and the Bean (1974)
- Freedom Downtime (2001)
- Freedom Fields (2018)
- Freedom Writers (2007)
- Freedomland (2006)
- Freejack (1992)
- Freelance: (1971, 2007 & 2023)
- Freelancers (2012)
- Freeway (1988 & 1996)
- Freeway II: Confessions of a Trickbaby (1999)
- Freeze Frame (2004)
- Freeze Me (2000)
- French Cancan (1955)
- The French Connection (1971)
- French Connection II (1975)
- The French Dispatch (2021)
- French Exit: (1995 & 2020)
- French Kiss: (1995, 2011 & 2015)
- The French Kissers (2009)
- The French Lieutenant's Woman (1981)
- The French Minister (2013)
- A French Mistress (1960)
- French Rarebit (1951)
- French Twist (1996)
- A Frenchman (2019)
- Frenemies (2012)
- Frenzy (1972)
- Frequency (2000)
- Frequently Asked Questions About Time Travel (2009)
- Fresh: (1994 & 2009)
- A Fresh Air Romance (1912)
- Fresh Hare (1942)
- Fresh Horses (1988)
- A Fresh Start (1910)
- The Freshman: (1925 & 1990)
- Freud: The Secret Passion (1962)

==== Fri ====
- Fric-Frac (1939)
- Frida: (2002 & 2024)
- Frida – Straight from the Heart (1991)
- Frida, en trotjänarinna (1999 TV)
- Friday: (2012, 2016 & 2023)
- Friday series:
  - Friday (1995)
  - Next Friday (2000)
  - Friday After Next (2002)
- Friday the 13th series:
  - Friday the 13th: (1980 & 2009)
  - Friday the 13th Part 2 (1981)
  - Friday the 13th Part III (1982)
  - Friday the 13th: The Final Chapter (1984)
  - Friday the 13th: A New Beginning (1985)
  - Friday the 13th Part VI: Jason Lives (1986)
  - Friday the 13th Part VII: The New Blood (1988)
  - Friday the 13th Part VIII: Jason Takes Manhattan (1989)
  - Freddy vs. Jason (2003)
- Friday or Another Day (2005)
- Friday Download: The Movie (2015)
- Friday Foster (1975)
- Friday Night: (2000 & 2002)
- Friday Night Lights (2004)
- Friday Night Plan (2023)
- Friday the Thirteenth: (1933 & 1949)
- Fridericus (1937)
- Fridericus Rex (1922)
- Fridericus Rex – elfter Teil (1957)
- Fridolf in the Lion's Den (1933)
- Fridolf Stands Up! (1958)
- Fried Barry (2020)
- Fried Fish, Chicken Soup and a Premiere Show (2011)
- Fried Green Tomatoes (1991)
- Frieda (1947)
- Friedemann Bach (1941)
- Friedrich Schiller (1923)
- Friedrich Schiller – The Triumph of a Genius (1940)
- Friend: (1987 & 2001)
- The Friend (2024)
- A Friend of the Deceased (1997)
- A Friend to Die For (1994) (TV)
- Friend of the Family (1995)
- A Friend of the Family (2005) (TV)
- Friend or Foe (1982)
- Friend: The Great Legacy (2013)
- Friend Husband (1918)
- A Friend of Mine (2011)
- Friend Request (2016)
- Friend Request Pending (2011)
- Friend Ripp (1923)
- Friend of the World (2020)
- Friend Zone (2009)
- Friendly Enemies: (1925 & 1942)
- Friendly Fire: (1979, 2006 & 2024)
- A Friendly Husband (1923)
- Friendly Neighbors (1940)
- Friendly Persuasion: (1956 & 1975 TV)
- Friends: (1912, 1938, 1971, 1988, 1993, 1999, 2001, 2002 & 2016)
- Friends 'Til the End (1997 TV)
- Friends After 3.11 (2011)
- Friends with Benefits (2011)
- Friends by Chance (2017)
- The Friends of Eddie Coyle (1973)
- Friends & Family (2001)
- Friends from France (2013)
- Friends of God: A Road Trip with Alexandra Pelosi (2007 TV)
- Friends Have Reasons (2000)
- Friends with Kids (2012)
- Friends for Life (1955)
- Friends & Lovers (1999)
- Friends and Lovers (1931)
- Friends with Money (2006)
- Friends: Mononoke Shima no Naki (2011)
- Friends but Married (2018)
- Friends and Neighbours (1959)
- Friends and Romans (2014)
- Friends and Strangers (2021)
- Friends Till Death (2023)
- Friends in Trouble (2018)
- Friends and Years (1965)
- Friendsgiving (2020)
- Friendship! (2010)
- A Friendship in Vienna (1988) (TV)
- Friendship's Death (1987)
- Friendship's Field (1995)
- Fright Night: (1985 & 2011)
- Fright Night Part 2 (1988)
- The Frighteners (1996)
- Frigid Hare (1949)
- Frisco Kid (1935)
- The Frisco Kid (1979)
- Fritz the Cat (1972)
- Frivolous Wife (2008)

==== Fro ====
- The Frog Prince: (1971, 1985 & 1986)
- Frogs (1972)
- Frogs for Snakes (1998)
- The Frogville (2014)
- Frolicking Fish (1930)
- From A to B (2014)
- From Afar (2015)
- From Bangkok to Mandalay (2016)
- From Bedrooms to Billions (2014)
- From Beijing with Love (1994)
- From Beyond (1986)
- From Beyond the Grave (1974)
- From Bondage to Freedom (1911)
- From C to C: Chinese Canadian Stories of Migration (2011)
- From Cherry English (2004)
- From Corleone to Brooklyn (1979)
- From Dawn Till Sunset (1975)
- From the Drain (1967)
- From Dreams to Reality: A Tribute to Minority Inventors (1986)
- From Dusk till Dawn series:
  - From Dusk till Dawn (1996)
  - From Dusk till Dawn 2: Texas Blood Money (1999)
  - From Dusk till Dawn 3: The Hangman's Daughter (2000)
- From the Earth to the Moon (1958)
- From Generation to Generation (1959)
- From Hand to Mouth (1919)
- From Hare to Eternity (1997)
- From Hare to Heir (1960)
- From Hell (2001)
- From Hell to Heaven (1933)
- From Hell to Hell (1997)
- From Hell It Came (1957)
- From Hell to Texas (1958)
- From Hell to Victory (1979)
- From Here to Eternity (1953)
- From Hilde, with Love (2024)
- From Hollywood to Deadwood (1988)
- From Hollywood to Rose (2017)
- From Jennifer (2017)
- From Justin to Kelly (2003)
- From Karkheh to Rhein (1993)
- From Language to Language (2004)
- From Leadville to Aspen: A Hold-Up in the Rockies (1906)
- From the Life of a Chief of the Criminal Police (1983)
- From the Life of Fyodor Kuzkin (1989)
- From the Life of the Marionettes (1980) (TV)
- From Madrid to Heaven (1952)
- From the Manger to the Cross (1912)
- From Mao to Mozart: Isaac Stern in China (1979)
- From Mexico with Love (2009)
- From the Mixed-Up Files of Mrs. Basil E. Frankweiler: (1973 & 1995 TV)
- From Morn to Midnight (1920)
- From My Window, Without a Home… (2006)
- From Noon till Three (1976)
- From Now On (2007)
- From Nowhere (2016)
- From Other Worlds (2004)
- From Paris with Love (2010)
- From Patrice to Lumumba (2019)
- From Prada to Nada (2011)
- From Russia with Love (1963)
- From Saigon to Dien Bien Phu (1967)
- From Saturday to Sunday (1931)
- From Soup to Nuts (1928)
- From Stump to Ship (1930)
- From Sudan to Argentina (2022)
- From Sydney with Love (2012)
- From the Terrace (1960)
- From This Day Forward (1946)
- From Time to Time (2009)
- From Up on Poppy Hill (2011)
- From Vegas to Macau (2014)
- From Vegas to Macau II (2015)
- From Vegas to Macau III (2016)
- From What Is Before (2014)
- From Where They Stood (2021)
- From a Whisper to a Scream (1987)
- From Within (2008)
- From Zero to I Love You (2019)
- The Front (1976)
- The Front Page: (1931 & 1974)
- The Front Room (2024)
- The Front Runner (2018)
- Frontier Crucible (2025)
- Frontier Horizon (1939)
- Frontier(s) (2008)
- Frost/Nixon (2009)
- Frostbite: (2005 & 2006)
- Frostbiter: Wrath of the Wendigo (1995)
- Frosty Roads (1985)
- Frosty the Snowman (1969) (TV)
- Frownland (2007)
- Frozen: (1997, 2005, 2007, 2010 American, 2010 Hong Kong & 2013)
- Frozen 2 (2019)
- Frozen 3 (2027)
- Frozen with Fear (2000)
- A Frozen Flower (2008)
- Frozen River (2008)

==== Fru–Fry ====
- Fruit Fly (2009)
- The Fruit Hunters (2012)
- The Fruit Machine: (1988 & 2018)
- Fruit in the Neighbour's Garden: (1935 & 1956)
- Fruit and Nut (2009)
- Fruit of Paradise (1970)
- The Fruitless Tree (2016)
- Fruits Basket: Prelude (2022)
- Fruits of Desire (1916)
- Fruits of Passion (1919)
- Fruits of Passion (1981)
- Fruitvale Station (2013)
- Frybread Face and Me (2023)
- Frække Frida og de frygtløse spioner (1994)

=== Fu ===
- Fu Bo (2003)

==== Fub–Fue ====
- FUBAR (2002)
- FUBAR 2 (2010)
- Fuck (2006)
- Fuck for Forest (2012)
- Fucking Idiots (2020)
- Fuck My Life (2010)
- Fuck My Son! (2025)
- Fuck Up (2012)
- Fuck You (2018)
- A Fucking Cruel Nightmare (2010)
- Fucking with Nobody (2020)
- Fuckland (2000)
- Fucktoys (2025)
- Fudge 44 (2005)
- Fudoh: The New Generation (1996)
- Fuego: (1969, 2007 & 2014)
- Fuego en el alma (2005)
- Fuego en la sangre (1966)
- Fuel (2008)
- The Fuel of Life (1917)
- Fueled: The Man They Called Pirate (2016)
- Fuelin' Around (1949)
- Fuelling Poverty (2012)
- Fuera de la ley (1964)

==== Fug–Fum ====
- Fuga (2006)
- Fugitive (2019)
- The Fugitive: (1910, 1920, 1925, 1933, 1947 American, 1947 French, 1972, 1993 & 2003)
- Fugitive Dreams (2020)
- The Fugitive Kind (1959)
- Fugitive Lady: (1934 & 1950)
- Fugitive at Large (1939)
- Fugitive Lovers (1934)
- A Fugitive from Matrimony (1919)
- Fugitive Mind (1999)
- Fugitive from Montreal (1950)
- A Fugitive from the Past (1965)
- Fugitive Pieces (2007)
- Fugitive Rage (1996)
- Fugitive Road (1934)
- Fugitive in the Sky (1936)
- Fugitive from Sonora (1943)
- Fugitive Valley (1941)
- Fugitives for a Night (1938)
- Fugue (2018)
- Fuji (1975)
- Fujian Blue (2007)
- Fukrey series:
  - Fukrey (2013)
  - Fukrey Returns (2017)
  - Fukrey 3 (2023)
- Fukri (2017)
- Fukouka (2020)
- Full 3 Dhamaal (2008)
- Full Alert (1997)
- Full Blast (1999)
- Full Body Massage (1995)
- Full Clip (2004)
- Full Confession (1939)
- Full Contact (1992)
- A Full Day's Work (1973)
- Full Disclosure: (2001 & 2005)
- Full Eclipse (1993)
- Full Fathom Five (1990)
- Full and Final (2013)
- Full Frontal (2002)
- Full Grown Men (2006)
- Full House (1952)
- Full Metal Jacket (1987)
- The Full Monteverdi (2007)
- The Full Monty (1997)
- Full Moon in Blue Water (1988)
- Full Moon High (1981)
- Full Moon in New York (1989)
- Full Moon in Paris (1984)
- Full Out (2015) (TV)
- Full River Red (2023)
- Full Tilt Boogie (1997)
- Full Time (2021)
- Full-Court Miracle (2003) (TV)
- Fullmetal Alchemist series:
  - Fullmetal Alchemist the Movie: Conqueror of Shamballa (2005)
  - Fullmetal Alchemist: The Sacred Star of Milos (2011)
  - Fullmetal Alchemist (2017)
- Fulltime Killer (2001)
- Fumō Chitai (1976)

==== Fun ====
- Fun (1994)
- Fun in Acapulco (1963)
- Fun Asaru (1996)
- Fun Bar Karaoke (1997)
- Fun with Dick and Jane: (1977 & 2005)
- Fun Down There (1988)
- Fun and Fancy Free (1947)
- The Fun House (1973)
- Fun Is Beautiful (1980)
- Fun Mom Dinner (2017)
- Fun Size (2012)
- Fun2shh... Dudes in the 10th Century (2003)
- Funan (2018)
- The Funeral: (1984 & 1996)
- Funeral in Berlin (1966)
- Funeral Home (1980)
- The Funeral Home (2020)
- A Funeral for Lightning (2016)
- Funeral Parade of Roses (1969)
- The Funeral Party (2007)
- Funhouse (2019)
- The Funhouse (1981)
- The Funhouse Massacre (2015)
- Funky Forest (2005)
- Funky Monkey (2004)
- Funkytown (2011)
- Funland (1987)
- Funniest Show on Earth (1953)
- Funny About Love (1990)
- Funny Bones (1995)
- Funny Boy (2020)
- Funny Cow (2017)
- Funny Dirty Little War (1983)
- Funny Face: (1957 & 2020)
- The Funny Face of the Godfather (1973)
- Funny Farm (1988)
- Funny Games (1997 & 2007)
- Funny Girl (1964)
- Funny Ha Ha (2007)
- Funny Lady (1975)
- Funny Magic (1969)
- A Funny Man (2011)
- Funny Pages (2022)
- Funny People (2009)
- Funny Stories (1962)
- Funny Story (2018)
- A Funny Thing Happened on the Way to the Forum (1966)
- A Funny Thing Happened on the Way to the Moon (2001)
- Funny Things Happen Down Under (1965)
- Funny Valentines (1999)
- Funral (2022)
- Funuke Show Some Love, You Losers! (2007)

==== Fur ====
- Fur: An Imaginary Portrait of Diane Arbus (2006)
- The Fur Collar (1962)
- Furie (2019)
- The Furies: (1930 & 1950)
- Furiosa: A Mad Max Saga (2024)
- Furioso (1950)
- Furious (2017)
- Furious Slaughter (1972)
- Furlough (2018)
- Furnace (2007)
- Furrows (1951)
- Furry Vengeance (2010)
- Fursat (2023)
- Fursonas (2016)
- The Further Adventures of the Flag Lieutenant (1927)
- The Further Adventures of Tennessee Buck (1988)
- The Further Adventures of Uncle Sam (1970
- The Further Adventures of the Wilderness Family (1978)
- Further Beyond (2016)
- A Further Gesture (1997)
- The Further Mis-Adventures of Cliff Booth (2026)
- Further Up the Creek (1958)
- Fury: (1923, 1936, 1947, 2012 & 2014)
- The Fury (1978)
- The Fury of Achilles (1962)
- Fury Below (1936)
- Fury of the Demon (2016)
- Fury at Furnace Creek (1948)
- The Fury of Hercules (1962)
- Fury in the Pacific (1945)
- Fury of the Pagans (1960)
- The Fury of a Patient Man (2016)
- Fury at Smugglers' Bay (1961)
- The Fury of the Wolfman (1972)

==== Fus–Fuz ====
- Fuse (2003)
- The Fuse: Or How I Burned Simon Bolivar (2011)
- Fuses (1967)
- Fuss and Feathers (1918)
- Fuss of the Fusses (1979)
- Futari no hitomi (1952)
- Futile Attraction (2004)
- A Futile and Stupid Gesture (2018)
- Futtocks End (1970)
- Futurama series:
  - Futurama: Bender's Big Score (2007)
  - Futurama: The Beast with a Billion Backs (2008)
  - Futurama: Bender's Game (2008)
  - Futurama: Into the Wild Green Yonder (2009)
- The Future (2011)
- Future '38 (2017)
- The Future Ahead (2017)
- Future Block (1987)
- Future Cops (1993)
- The Future of Emily (1984)
- The Future of Food (2004)
- Future Force (1989)
- Future Hunters (1986)
- Future Lasts Forever (2011)
- Future Past (1987)
- Future Shock (1972)
- Future Shock! The Story of 2000AD (2014)
- Future War (1997)
- Future Weather (2012)
- The Future of Work and Death (2016)
- Future X-Cops (2010)
- Future Zone (1990)
- Future-Kill (1985)
- Futuresport (1998) (TV)
- Futureworld (1976)
- Futuro Beach (2014)
- Fuuto PI: The Portrait of Kamen Rider Skull (2024)
- Fuze (2025)
- Fuzz (1972)
- Fuzzbucket (1986) (TV)
- Fuzzy the Hero (1973)
- Fuzzy Settles Down (1944)

=== Fy ===
- Fyre (2019)
- Fyre Fraud (2019)

Previous: List of films: E Next: List of films: G

== See also ==
- Lists of films
- Lists of actors
- List of film and television directors
- List of documentary films
- List of film production companies
