= Feast (disambiguation) =

A feast or banquet is a large meal.

Feast may also refer to:

== Events or meals ==
- Feast day, commemorating a certain saint or blessed
- Feast Festival, Adelaide's annual LGBT festival
- Festival, an event ordinarily celebrated by a community and centering on some characteristic aspect of that community
- Nineteen Day Feast, a monthly meeting held in Bahá'í communities to worship, consult, and socialize

== People ==
- Michael William Feast, astronomer

== Art, entertainment, and media ==
=== Films ===
- Feast (2005 film), an American horror comedy film
- Feast (2014 film), an American animated short film
- Feast (2021 film), a Dutch film
- The Feast, a 2021 Welsh film
- Feast, a 2021 Philippine film

=== Music ===
- Feast (The Creatures album), 1983
- Feast (Annihilator album), 2013
- .Feast, a stoner rock band from Indonesia
- "Feast", a 2025 single by Hakos Baelz

== Other uses ==
- Families Empowered and Supporting Treatment of Eating Disorders (F.E.A.S.T.)
- FEAST test, used to assess candidates for training as Air Traffic Controllers in Europe
- Feast, an ice cream bar manufactured by Wall's
