= Bailey Spinn =

- Born: Bailey Rose Spinnenweber; August 5, 2002 (age 24); Fairfax, Virginia
- Genres: Pop rock, Pop-punk, Rock
- Occupations: Singer, songwriter, influencer
- Instruments: Vocals, electric guitar
- Years active: 2022–present
- Label: AWAL
- Website: baileyrosespinn.com

Bailey Rose Spinnenweber (born August 5, 2002), known professionally as Bailey Spinn, is an American singer-songwriter and TikTok creator. She rose to prominence through her point-of-view videos on TikTok and has been included in People magazine's list of emerging artists.

== Life and career ==
=== Early life ===
Bailey Spinn is from Fairfax, Virginia, and has two sisters. Growing up, she was a musical theater fan and played several instruments (viola, flute, trombone, and ukulele), as well as sang karaoke in her basement. She was inspired by influencers such as Emma Chamberlain to be a content creator.

=== 2020–2022: Influencer career ===
Spinn started out on Instagram when she was 15, then transitioned to TikTok during the 2020 COVID-19 pandemic. On TikTok, she began making point-of-view videos and acting out skits, gaining 100,000 followers within her first three days and 5 million within her first three months. She enrolled at San Diego State University with a major in marketing but dropped out after a year to focus on her social media presence.

=== 2022–present: Music career ===
In 2022, Spinn started posting covers on YouTube, gaining 3 million subscribers within a year. Her first cover, "Traitor" by Olivia Rodrigo, received 1.5 million views within its first month.

In April 2023, Spinn released her debut single, "Romance is Dead", which she premiered on Tamron Hall. She released her debut EP, My Worst Enemy, in August 2023. Within a year of her debut, Spinn garnered more than 25 million streams and 300,000 monthly Spotify listeners. In 2024, she did her first headline tour, the Happy Ending Tour, which sold out. She also performed in the Emo Night side show at the When We Were Young festival in Las Vegas.

Spinn's debut album, Loser, came out on March 28, 2025. She attended the Billboard Women in Music event a day later. In September 2025, Spinn was included in People magazine's list of emerging artists. She released "Fear of Going Out" in October 2025 and "Critical" in November 2025 as singles for her upcoming sophomore album, which she has said will be "darker" and "heavier".

== Artistry ==
=== Musical styles ===
Spinn's music is largely labeled as 2000s pop rock and pop-punk and is noted for its distortion, heavy guitars, and heavy drum beats. Her album Loser explores numerous alternative rock genres, including a fully orchestrated track that draws on Evanescence's music. She cites Pierce the Veil, All Time Low, Paramore, Evanescence, Flyleaf, Olivia Rodrigo, and Avril Lavigne as musical influences.

=== Songwriting ===
Spinn's songwriting frequently tackles mental health topics and has been noted for its authenticity and vulnerability. Her lyrics draw from both personal experiences and fictional scenarios, and she describes songwriting sessions as focusing on her emotions. She purposefully omits gendered pronouns from her music.

== Cultural influence ==
Spinn is an anti-bullying advocate because of her experiences with bullying growing up. She has partnered with the National Eating Disorder Association. In 2024, she collaborated with Dr. Chukwuemeka Nwuba to compile stories for Eating Disorders Don't Discriminate: Stories of Illness, Hope and Recovery from Diverse Voices.
