= Eating Disorders Coalition =

Advocacy group

The Eating Disorders Coalition (EDC) is a Washington, D.C. advocacy organization working to advance the federal recognition of eating disorders as a public health priority. The EDC was founded in 2000 and is incorporated in Massachusetts. The full legal name of the organization is the Eating Disorders Coalition for Research, Policy & Action.

== Operation ==
The EDC works with the U.S. Congress, with the executive branch of government, with national nonprofit organizations, and with the media to focus attention on the need for better treatment, research, and prevention of anorexia nervosa (AN), bulimia nervosa (BN), binge eating disorder (BED), and eating disorders not otherwise specified (ED-NOS).

== Funding ==
The United States spends relatively little money on eating disorder-specific programs and research. For example, in 2006 the U.S. spent $21 million on eating disorders research for a population of 5-10 million affected individuals. By comparison, in 2006 over $300 million was spent on schizophrenia, which impacts approximately the same number of people as eating disorders.

== Awareness ==
In 2008, the Eating Disorders Coalition provided extensive support for a national public awareness campaign organized by Congressman Patrick J. Kennedy of Rhode Island and Congressman Jim Ramstad of Minnesota. The campaign included town hall rallies across the country in which people with eating disorders or their surviving family members spoke about barriers to treatment and called for legislation to expand access to care. The EDC also identified speakers for a series of congressional hearings organized by Rep. Kennedy. Congress passed the Mental Health Parity Act later that year.

== See also ==
- National Eating Disorders Association
- Families Empowered and Supporting Treatment of Eating Disorders
