= Fiction (film) =

- Spanish film poster
- Catalan: Ficció
- Spanish: Ficción
- Directed by: Cesc Gay
- Written by: Tomas Aragay; Cesc Gay
- Produced by: Marta Esteban; Gerardo Herrero
- Starring: Eduard Fernández; Javier Cámara; Montse Germán; Carme Pla; Àgata Roca
- Cinematography: Andreu Rebés
- Music by: Cesc Gay; Xavier Salvà
- Production company: Messidor Films
- Distributed by: Alta Films S.A.
- Release dates: 9 September 2006 (Toronto); 10 November 2006 (Spain)
- Running time: 107 minutes
- Country: Spain
- Languages: Catalan; Spanish

Fiction (Catalan: Ficció; Spanish: Ficción) is a 2006 Spanish romantic drama film directed by Cesc Gay. The film follows a couple in their thirties who fall in love during a brief encounter while holidaying in the Pyrenees. It features dialogue in Catalan and Spanish.

== Plot ==
Àlex, a shy and reserved filmmaker suffering from screenwriter's block, goes on holiday to a village in the Pyrenees to stay with his old friend Santi, who has a cabin there. Together the two friends go to have dinner with Santi's lesbian neighbor, Judith, who in turn is receiving the visit of a Monica, a violinist. At Judith's house an attraction between Alex and Monica starts almost imperceptibly over the dinner table when Monica identifies with the character that Àlex describes at the protagonist of his next film project. The friendship between Monica and Àlex develops further when they go horseback riding.

During an excursion to the nearby lakes Àlex and Monica become separated from Santi and Judith on a mountain walk, and are forced to stay overnight in a mountain shelter. The wild setting is just right for romance and clearly there is a deep connection between them, but they do not act on their feelings of talk about them, instead their friendship deepens while talking about their lives. Àlex is married with two daughters. His wife, Silvia, was his high school sweetheart. Their marriage had not been an easy road and they even had to separate for one year. Monica has recently adopted a daughter from Africa. She has settled in the last two years with a journalist in the first steady relationship of her life.

Both Àlex and Santi ache to communicate but are embarrassed to do so. The usually carefree Santi has been re-evaluating his own aimless life in the face of mortality and is planning to have a child with Judith, a project that had to be postponed by Judith's recent health scare. Unable to find motivation in his self-imposed exile to finish his work, Àlex decides to return home early, and agrees to join Santi and the others on a final camping trip to the Pyrenees in a show of solidarity for their ailing friend before heading back to the city. However, when Alex and Monica become hopelessly lost after hiking on the wrong mountain on their way back to the base of the trail, the two find themselves drawn even further together by their shared misadventure. Similar to the unmotivated, 39-year-old protagonist of his latest film, Alex, too, faces a daunting blank page, vacillating between the commercial demands of his profession and integrity of his creative vision, youthful liberation and middle-aged inhibition. Like Àlex's unfinished script, their brief encounter, too, remains an unwritten fiction charged with imagined possibility and resigned regret.

When Silvia, Àlex's wife, surprisingly appears at the countryside retreat with the couple two daughters, the connection between Àlex and Monica seems to have come to an abrupt ending. Monica, strolling around town, meets Alex's family. Her trip is near its end and she plans to leave the area early the next day. That morning Àlex, leaving his family still sleeping, take his car and reach Judith and his lesbian girlfriend who are driving Monica to take the train. Stopping on the road, Monica and Alex confess to each other the love that they are feeling; they kiss passionately and continued their lives separate ways.

== Cast ==
- Eduard Fernández as Àlex
- Javier Cámara as Santi
- Montse Germán as Mónica
- Carme Pla as Judith
- Àgata Roca as Silvia

== Release ==
The film was theatrically released in Spain on 10 November 2006.

It was made available in Region 1 DVD in Spanish with English subtitles.

== Reception ==
Jonathan Holland of Variety deemed the film to be a "beautifully muted, minimalist take on two thirtysomethings tripped up by their unforeseen passion for one another".

== See also ==
- List of Spanish films of 2006
