= FEAST test =

European air traffic controller selection test

The First European Air Traffic Controller Selection Test (FEAST) is a tool that helps Air Navigation Service Providers (ANSPs) identify the most suitable candidates for the job of air traffic controllers. FEAST was designed by and made available by Eurocontrol, the European Organisation for the Safety of Air Navigation. It is used by 44 organisations, including civil and military European Air Navigation Service Providers and certified ATC aviation training academies and universities.

== Structure ==
The FEAST test package consists of 3 modules:

- FEAST I – a set of cognitive tests and an English language test
- FEAST II – two ATC work sample tests
- FEAST III – a personality questionnaire

Tests are administered in a standardized way, and all results are scored by computer. This is done to ensure the objectivity of the process. The first phase of FEAST aims at measuring basic skills and abilities in decision-making, logical reasoning, visual perception, attention, multi-tasking, and spatial orientation. This phase also includes a test on English language knowledge. All parts of the FEAST I consist of multiple choice questions. Once the candidate has successfully passed the FEAST I tests, they may be invited to attend a second round of testing. In this second phase they do one or two work sample tests:

- the FEAST Dynamic ATC Radar test (FEAST DART)
- and possibly the FEAST Multipass test

These tests are aimed at measuring the multi-tasking abilities. The tests are more complex and require the candidates to perform a number of different tasks at the same time. The third phase of FEAST consists of the assessment of personality traits and behavioral tendencies. The exact content of this phase differs among organizations that use FEAST.

== Preparation for FEAST ==
The tests are demanding in terms of concentration. Resilience and perseverance are required. Therefore, EUROCONTROL advises that the candidates should only attend the testing in a good physical and mental condition. EUROCONTROL discourages specific test preparation; however, there are some general areas in which the candidates can prepare themselves:

- In case of non-native speakers of English, applicants can prepare by improving their general level of English proficiency.
- Applicants may familiarize themselves with basic aviation concepts and terminology (although no ATC background knowledge is required to perform FEAST).
- Candidates could look for information about Air Traffic Control (ATC) and the job of an Air Traffic Controller to familiarise themselves with the challenges and demands of the job.

FEAST tests are designed for beginners with no background in ATC. The tests instructions are very detailed and ensure that everything is explained before the tests start.

== Result ==
A result is given directly after the test, or via a letter, e-mail or phone call. These results are computed by the central computer of Eurocontrol in Brussels (each candidate is connected with this computer via internet). The score required to proceed to the next round of selection differs from one air traffic control organisation to another. If a candidate has already successfully participated in a FEAST test, Eurocontrol offers a special certificate for trying it again elsewhere. Each company has a different opinion of whether an applicant is allowed to try the test again or not. According to the rules of Eurocontrol, unsuccessful applicants must wait 2 years before a second attempt.

== Criticism and commendation of the FEAST test ==
Although 44 member states of Eurocontrol use the FEAST test, it is not as popular elsewhere. The reason for this is that, until January 2015, the test could only be provided to ANSPs and ATC training academies in Eurocontrol member states. A particular criticism of the FEAST test refers to the English part of the FEAST test: some national air traffic control organisations add (after a successful FEAST test) an oral English test (a conversation with a native English speaking air traffic controller). The results of this oral English test are equivalent to the so-called "ICAO Level 4 English Knowledge Requirement"[1], which every pilot and air traffic controller must have. People who obtain relatively low scores in the English part of the FEAST test often pass this second English test easily and one can doubt how objective the English part of the FEAST test actually is.

On the other hand, the FEAST test is seen to be a very fair test: if this test is taken directly at Eurocontrol, all travel expenses and costs of hotels are reimbursed, as far as the applicant's residence is out of an area of 50 km from the Maastricht upper area control centre. Everyone, especially those of poorer member-countries of Eurocontrol, has a fair and realistic chance. Excessively so, no specific knowledge of mathematics or physics are required. Psychological "pre-selections" do not exist either. Applicants from all member countries of Eurocontrol are encouraged to participate and since the systems of education of each of the member states are rather different, Eurocontrol sets the priority of the FEAST test on basic skills. Additionally, unlike some other national air traffic control organisations, multiple attempts are possible.
