= A Fucking Cruel Nightmare =

2010 horror film by Sebastian Zeglarski

- Film poster
- Directed by: Sebastian Zeglarski
- Starring: Raul Maximilian; Christian Nowak; Sebastian Zeglarski
- Release date: 2010
- Running time: 83 min.
- Country: Germany
- Language: English

A Fucking Cruel Nightmare is a 2010 German horror film directed by Sebastian Zeglarski. The film starring Raul Maximilian, Christian Nowak and Sebastian Zeglarski in the lead roles.

== Cast ==
- Raul Maximilian
- Christian Nowak
- Sebastian Zeglarski
