= The Forgotten (2019 film) =

- Directed by: Daria Onishchenko
- Written by: Claudia Lehmann; Daria Onyshchenko
- Produced by: Dmytro Kozhema; Claudia Lehmann; Igor Savychenko
- Cinematography: Erol Zubcevic
- Edited by: Simon Gutknecht
- Music by: Martin Skalsky
- Distributed by: Arthouse traffic
- Release dates: 12 October 2019 (WFF); 3 September 2020
- Running time: 105 minutes
- Language: Ukrainian

The Forgotten (Ukrainian: «Забуті», romanized: Zabuti) is a Ukrainian-Swiss co-production drama directed by Daria Onishchenko in 2019. The film tells the story of a thirty-year-old Ukrainian language teacher, Nina, who lives in Luhansk, occupied during the Russian-Ukrainian war, and who, due to the ban on the Ukrainian language by the Russian occupation authorities, is forced to retrain from a Ukrainian language teacher to a Russian language teacher, and at the same time struggle with internal experiences and feelings due to a sudden outbreak of love between her and a local seventeen-year-old boy.

The world premiere of the film took place on October 12, 2019, at the 35th Warsaw Film Festival as part of the competition program "1-2" ("Competition of the first and second feature films of young directors"), where the film received a special mention from the jury. The film was presented in Ukraine on August 22, 2020, as part of the non-competitive program of the 49th Kyiv International Film Festival "Molodist". The film was released in Ukrainian limited rental on September 3, 2020, and is distributed by Arthouse traffic.

== Plot ==
Thirty-year-old Nina, a Ukrainian language teacher, lives in occupied Luhansk during the Russian-Ukrainian war (since 2014). Due to the Russian occupation authorities’ ban on the Ukrainian language, she is forced to take retraining courses to become a Russian language teacher. Because of her husband's work, Nina cannot leave occupied Luhansk.

Seventeen-year-old Andriy, orphaned by the war, tries to connect with the “outside world” and remind it that he exists. Their paths cross on the first day of September when Andriy ends up in the police station for putting a Ukrainian flag on the school roof. Risking her own life, Nina saves him. A strange friendship develops between them, sometimes resembling love.

When Nina's husband, a small-time smuggler named Yuriy, is forced to urgently leave the Russian-occupied territory of the so-called “LPR” and move to mainland Ukraine, Nina is uncertain whether she wants to leave Russian occupation with him. Fear of the unknown future and her growing strong feelings for seventeen-year-old Andriy make her even more conflicted.

== See also ==
- Russo-Ukrainian War
- War in Donbas
- Cinema of Ukraine
