= From Dreams to Reality: A Tribute to Minority Inventors =

1986 documentary

From Dreams To Reality: A Tribute to Minority Inventors is a 1986 documentary featuring African-American actor, writer and director Ossie Davis. It features several notable African Americans, Native Americans, Asian Americans, and Latinos who have made significant contributions to science, technology, and medicine. With a 27-minute runtime, the documentary film was executive produced by Robert B. Amdur and the U.S. Patent and Trademark Office (USPTO) to encourage more Americans to prepare for and consider careers in science and technology.

== Plot ==
Davis begins the film with a tour of the U.S. Patent Office in Virginia, a facility that processes over four million patents yearly.

The film profiles the following scientists:

- Louis Latimer; an African American collaborator with Thomas Edison. Latimer is credited with numerous patents including advances in electricity
- Randall Woods; an African American inventor responsible for over sixty railroad industry patents including the three-rail system currently used in subway cars
- George Washington Carver; African-American inventor and scientist at Tuskegee Institute. he is noted for his agricultural and chemical research with numerous plants including peanuts.
- Garrett Morgan; an African American inventor who patented the traffic signal
- Dr. Charles Drew; an African-American physician, who modernized methods to preserve blood plasma.
- Dr. An Wang; an Asian-American inventor with patents involving the basic digital computer machine.
- Philip Stevens; a Native American inventor of defense system missiles.
- Ysidore Martinez; an Hispanic American inventor of knee implants for victims of arthritis.
- Dr. Meredith Gourdine; an African-American inventor responsible for designing a fog dispersal system used on airport runways.
- Mildred Smith; an African-American inventor of the genealogy game "Family Traditions".

== Cast and crew ==
- Ossie Davis - Narrator
- Robert B. Amdur - Executive Producer
- Vicki Kodama - Director, Writer, Producer
- EVKO Productions - Producer
- Nicholas Anderson - Editor
- Patricia Carter Sluby - Technical Advisor
- William Mears - Original Music
- Nicholas Anderson - Guitar Music
- Bob Waybright- Director of Photography
- Animation House, Inc. - Animation
