= Falling (2017 film) =

2017 film directed by Marina Stepanskaya

Falling is a 2017 Ukrainian psychological drama film directed by Marina Stepanskaya. The film participated in the main competition program of the 52nd Karlovy Vary International Film Festival and the National Competition Program of the 8th Odesa International Film Festival.

In August 2017, the film took part in the selection for the nomination of the film from Ukraine for the 90th anniversary Academy Award of the American Academy of Motion Picture Arts and Sciences in the category "Best International Feature Film."

== Plot ==
The film takes place in modern Kyiv, where the main 27-year-old "non-heroes" are trying to make a difficult choice in the conditions of a "heroic time."

Anton, a musical prodigy who failed to meet the expectations placed on him, returns home after two years of study in Switzerland and six months of treatment for alcohol addiction in a neuropsychiatric dispensary near Kyiv. His grandfather, a man of strict principles, takes the guy to the village, far from the charms of the big city. One day Anton meets Katya, who, like him, is trying to find her own way in life. She is due to travel to Berlin soon with her boyfriend Johann, a German photojournalist whom she met during the Maidan events. However, her meeting with Anton brings a new impetus to her life and has a profound impact on both of them...
