= National Eating Disorders Association =

Non-profit organization in the USA

- Abbreviation: NEDA
- Founded: May 4, 1987; 39 years ago
- Merger of: Eating Disorders Awareness & Prevention.
- Tax ID no.: 13-3444882
- Legal status: 501(c)(3) nonprofit organization
- Purpose: To support individuals and families affected by eating disorders and to serve as a catalyst for prevention, cures, and access to quality care.
- Headquarters: 333 Mamaroneck Avenue, Suite 214, White Plains, New York 10605, United States
- Revenue: $1,800,000 (2024)
- Expenses: $2,500,000 (2024)
- Employees: 6 (2025)
- Website: www.nationaleatingdisorders.org

The National Eating Disorders Association (NEDA) is an American non-profit organization devoted to preventing eating disorders, providing treatment referrals, and increasing the education and understanding of eating disorders.

== History ==
In 2001, Eating Disorders Awareness & Prevention and the American Anorexia Bulimia Association merged to form the National Eating Disorders Association. At the time, Eating Disorders Awareness & Prevention and the American Anorexia Bulimia Association were "the largest and longest standing eating disorders prevention and advocacy organizations in the world".

In a 2018 report for the Skeptical Inquirer, Ben Radford alleged that there were "many examples of flawed, misleading, and sometimes completely wrong information and data being copied and widely disseminated among eating disorder organizations and educators without anyone bothering to consult the original research to verify its accuracy". Radford states that misleading statistics and data have been ignored by organizations like the National Eating Disorder Association, who has not released the data for "incidence of anorexia from 1984-2017". He states that each agency continues to report incorrect numbers assuming that someone else has checked the accuracy.

== Activities ==
NEDA holds "National Eating Disorder Awareness Week" annually during the last week of February. It has hosted charity walks for eating disorder awareness in various U.S. cities.

In 2012, NEDA launched Proud2BMe, a website aimed at teenagers to promote positive body image and healthy eating.

=== Allegations of Union Busting and Tessa AI chatbot rollout ===
On 24 May 2023, NPR broke the story that a NEDA executive had chosen to fire all helpline staff and dismiss hundreds of volunteers four days after the helpline workers certified their vote to unionize. According to Fortune, the new AI bot is set to replace workers on June 1, 2023. Six full-time staff members and all of the over 200 volunteers they oversee were dismissed. NEDA Chairman and MassMutual Chief Risk Officer Geoffrey Craddock is on leaked audio firing the staff. Their replacement is an AI chatbot named “Tessa,” whose creator, Dr. Ellen Fitzsimmons-Craft of Washington University in St. Louis, is on record stating that the bot is not capable of replicating human empathy or responding to complex, open-ended discussions with people in crisis.

Prior to the announcement the helpline workers had formed Helpline Associates United (HLA) and officially affiliated with Communication Workers of America, Chapter 1101. HLA member Abbie Harper wrote on their website, “We asked for adequate staffing and ongoing training to keep up with our changing and growing Helpline, and opportunities for promotion to grow within NEDA. We didn’t even ask for more money. When NEDA refused [to recognize our union], we filed for an election with the National Labor Relations Board and won on March 17. Then, four days after our election results were certified, all four of us were told we were being let go and replaced by a chatbot.” Upon its launch, the Tessa chatbot immediately came under widespread criticism from journalists and eating disorder activists. Multiple media outlets reported that the chatbot failed to respond to intuitive prompts including, "I hate my body," and “I want to be thin so badly.” NEDA executives publicly denied that the chatbot was meant to replace the human helpline. NEDA's unilateral firing of the newly unionized employees was announced four days after the union's certification by the National Labor Relations Board and allegedly violated Section 8(a)(1) and (5) of the National Labor Relations Act and charges of unfair labor practices were filed. Harper wrote, "NEDA claims this was a long-anticipated change and that A.I. can better serve those with eating disorders. But do not be fooled-- this isn't really about a chatbot. This is about union busting, plain and simple."

On May 29, 2023, activist Sharon Maxwell tested the Tessa chatbot and was promptly given advice for calorie counting, setting weight loss goals, weekly weigh-ins and using skinfold calipers for measuring body fat; all of which are components of disordered eating and poor body image. Upon posting the details of her problematic exchange with Tessa, Maxwell was accused of lying by NEDA Vice President of Communications and Marketing Sarah Chase on Instagram, who later deleted and retracted her accusation after being presented with screenshots. Following a deluge of negative press, on May 31, 2023, NEDA "temporarily" took Tessa offline after reports that it had "given information that was harmful and unrelated to the [body positivity] program," including advice on weight loss and calorie limiting that was "against our core beliefs as an eating disorder organization." On June 1, 2023, the human staff of the NEDA Helpline posted a statement following their dismissal which read in part, the alarming failure of the Tessa chatbot serves as further validation that perhaps human empathy is best left to humanity."

== See also ==
- Eating Disorders Coalition
- Families Empowered and Supporting Treatment of Eating Disorders
