= Flame of Passion =

- Directed by: Tom Terriss
- Written by: Tom Terriss
- Screenplay by: Tom Terriss
- Starring: Tom Terriss; Ellaline Terriss; Rienzi De Cordova
- Release date: October 11, 1915 (US)
- Running time: 5 reels
- Country: United States
- Language: English

Flame of Passion is a 1915 American silent film directed by Tom Terriss. The film was produced by Terriss Feature Film Company and released on 11 October 2015 in the United States.

== Cast ==
- Tom Terriss as Dick Lorient
- Ellaline Terriss as Vampire Woman
- Rienzi De Cordova as John Stark
- Marguerite Hanley as Dulcie Lanyon
