= The Fable of the Small Town Favorite Who Was Ruined by Too Much Competition =

1916 American short comedy silent film

- Directed by: Unnamed
- Written by: George Ade
- Production company: Essanay Film Manufacturing Company
- Distributed by: General Film Company
- Release date: July 12, 1916 (United States)
- Country: United States
- Language: English

The Fable of the Small Town Favorite Who Was Ruined by Too Much Competition is a 1916 American short comedy silent film, the director unnamed and written by George Ade. It was released in cinemas on July 12, 1916, in the United States.
