= A Fake Diamond Swindler =

- Directed by: Georges Méliès
- Production company: Star Film Company
- Release date: May 1908
- Country: France
- Language: Silent

A Fake Diamond Swindler (French: L'Habit ne fait pas Lemoine ou Fabricant de diamants) is a 1908 French silent comedy film directed by Georges Méliès.

== Plot ==
A fraudster is at work in his laboratory, where he pretends to make synthetic diamonds. He is visited by numerous angry customers who have discovered the deception, as well as by the president of a South African diamond mining company, who watches the fraudster at work and is presented with a diamond tie pin for his cravat. Policemen carry the fraudster off to trial, but during the mayhem of the court case, he upends his opponents and escapes through a window. A chase ensues before the fake diamond swindler is finally caught and imprisoned.

== Production and release ==
As the film historian Georges Sadoul noted, the film parodies the career of Henri Lemoine, an engineer who had conned the diamond merchant De Beers into believing he had invented a process for making synthetic diamonds.

A Fake Diamond Swindler was released by Méliès's Star Film Company and is numbered 1116–1123 in its catalogues, where it was advertised as a vue d'actualité satirique. The film is currently presumed lost.
