= From Patrice to Lumumba =

2019 documentary film by Patrick Kabeya

From Patrice To Lumumba
- Directed by: Patrick Kabeya
- Written by: Patrick Kabeya; Mina Malu
- Produced by: KM Media Production; UPAF
- Narrated by: Mina Malu
- Edited by: Patrick Kabeya
- Release date: 16 April 2019 (Festival International du film Panafricain)
- Running time: 70 minutes
- Countries: Canada; Switzerland
- Language: French

From Patrice to Lumumba is a 2019 independent documentary story of Patrice Lumumba, written by Patrick Kabeya. This film chronicles the story of Patrice Lumumba, the first prime minister of the Democratic Republic of Congo and one of the faces associated with the country's liberation after Belgian colonization.

The film focuses on Lumumba's last letter to his wife Pauline. In the letter Lumumba keeps a militant tone but also reveals a more private side of the man, yet to be shown before. This story, mainly told in his own words, gives Lumumba back the humanity he was not afforded throughout his career.

The film premiered in April 2019 at the Festival international du film Panafricain de Cannes.

The film was nominated for the Flemish Commission For UNESCO for Best African Documentary for 2020.
