= The Fabulous Udin =

- Directed by: Herdanius Larobu
- Written by: Rons Imawan
- Produced by: Chand Parwez Servia; Fiaz Servia
- Starring: Ajil Ditto; Bella Graceva Amanda Putri; Aldy Rialdy Indrawan; Difa Ryansyah; Zulfa Maharani Putri; Raza Adhanzio; Musdalifah Basri; Lidya Kandou; Fandy Christian; Ussy Sulistiawaty
- Cinematography: Farro Fauzi
- Edited by: Cesa David Luckmansyah
- Music by: The Overtunes
- Production company: Starvision Plus
- Distributed by: Starvision Plus
- Release date: May 12, 2016
- Country: Indonesia
- Language: Indonesian

The Fabulous Udin is a 2016 Indonesian film directed by Herdanious Larobu as well as starred Ajil Ditto, Bella Graceva Amanda Putri, Aldy Rialdy Indrawan, Difa Ryansyah, Zulfa Maharani Putri, Raza Adhanzio, Musdalifah Basri, Lidya Kandou, Fandy Christian, and Ussy Sulistiawaty. The movie was adapted from a novel with same name by Rons Imawan.

== Cast ==
- Ajil Ditto as Udin
- Bella Graceva as Suri
- Aldy Rialdy Indrawan as Ucup
- Difa Ryansyah as Jeki
- Zulfa Maharani as Inong
- Raza Adhanzio as Sading
- Musdalifah Basri as Ainun
- Lydia Kandou as Udin's mother
- Fandy Christian as Cakka
- Ussy Sulistiawaty as Suri's mother

=== Special Performance ===
- The Overtunes

== Production ==
The Fabulous Udin was directed by Herdanius Larobu. The script was written by Cassandra Massardi. The producer of the film was Chand Parwez Servia of Starvision. The shooting began in the end of March 2016. The shooting was taken for about 15 days.

The story of the film was adapted from a novel of a same name by Rons Imawan.

== Release ==
The Fabulous Udin was released on May 12, 2016.

== Reception ==
A review from Republika stated that the main character, Udin, who is a middle-schooler is portrayed in the film too mature because of there are too much motivational phrases. The development process of the main character is also not clearly presented.
