= From Hollywood to Rose =

- Directed by: Liz Graham; Matt Jacobs
- Written by: Matt Jacobs
- Produced by: Liz Graham; Matt Jacobs; Eve Annenberg; Jon Schweigart
- Starring: Eve Annenberg; Maxx Maulion; Brad Herman
- Cinematography: James Carman; Jon Schweigart
- Edited by: Jack Haigis; Christine Kelley
- Music by: Joel Diamond
- Release date: 16 June 2017
- Running time: 96 minutes
- Country: United States
- Language: English

From Hollywood to Rose is an American comedy-drama film released on 16 June 2017 and directed by Liz Graham and Matt Jacobs, starring Eve Annenberg, Maxx Maulion and Brad Herman.

== Cast ==
- Eve Annenberg as Woman in Wedding Dress
- Maxx Maulion as Man in Cargo Paints
- Brad Herman as Guy in X-men Shirt
- Dave Wilder as Stanley
- Isadora O’Boto as Woman in the Pink Dress
- Chia Chien as Chinese Girl
- Linda Bisesti as The Lady with the Green Scarf
- Eric Deskin as Lizard Guy
- Danny Cleary as Meltdown Bus Driver

== Reception ==
Norman Gidney of Film Threat rated the film 3 stars out of 4 and wrote that the "respect it has for everyone’s story" makes the film "work". Simi Horwitz of Film Journal International wrote that while the film has "self-conscious quirkiness" and "wink-wink moments", it has "unexpected charm, appeal, even depth". The Hollywood Reporter wrote that the film "has a hard time getting beyond its ostentatious quirks and getting to the point; for some viewers who catch what will likely be a very short run, though, that aimlessness will be its main virtue."

Chelsea Phillips-Carr of PopMatters gave the film a rating of 4/10, praising Annenberg's performance while calling the film "clunky" and "unenjoyable". Katie Walsh of the Los Angeles Times wrote that the story is "thin and clichéd, relying on tired gags and stereotypes for humor."
