= The Fable of the Kid Who Shifted His Ideals to Golf and Finally Became a Baseball Fan and Took the Only Known Cure =

- Directed by: Unnamed
- Written by: George Ade
- Production company: Essanay Film Manufacturing Company
- Distributed by: General Film Company
- Release date: October 4, 1916 (U.S.)
- Country: United States
- Language: English

The Fable of the Kid Who Shifted His Ideals to Golf and Finally Became a Baseball Fan and Took the Only Known Cure is a 1916 American short comedy silent film pertaining to baseball, the director unnamed and distributed by Golden Film Company. Filming taking place in Chicago, it was released in cinemas on October 4, 1916, in the United States.
