= The Final Sacrifice =

- Promotional poster
- Directed by: Tjardus Greidanus
- Written by: Tjardus Greidanus; Christian Malcolm (uncredited); Bruce J. Mitchell (uncredited)
- Produced by: Tjardus Greidanus
- Starring: Christian Malcolm; Bruce J. Mitchell
- Cinematography: Jim Stacy
- Edited by: Tjardus Greidanus (as The Flying Dutchman); Glen Ludlow
- Music by: Robert Skeet
- Production company: Flying Dutchman Productions Ltd.
- Distributed by: Astral Video
- Release dates: 1990 (Canada); June 22, 1994 (United States)
- Running time: 78 minutes
- Country: Canada
- Language: English
- Budget: CAD$1,500

The Final Sacrifice (also known as Quest for the Lost City) is a 1990 independent Canadian adventure film produced and directed by Tjardus Greidanus, a freshman at Southern Alberta Institute of Technology, and stars Christian Malcolm and Bruce J. Mitchell. It faded into obscurity not long after its release but saw a renewed interest following its exposure on Mystery Science Theater 3000. In November 2025, Greidanus announced a new film, The Making of The Final Sacrifice, which he successfully funded through Kickstarter.

== Plot ==
Teenage Troy McGreggor finds a map belonging to his late father, Thomas, who was murdered seven years earlier. Thomas, an archaeologist, met his untimely death after becoming involved with a mysterious cult led by a sinister man with supernatural powers known only as Satoris. The orphaned Troy decides to study the map to learn about the circumstances of his father's death. Sensing that the map has been uncovered, the cultists track Troy down. After a failed home invasion, they give chase as Troy flees via bicycle. Eventually, Troy escapes by jumping into the back of a battered pickup truck heading into the Albertan countryside. Soon, the truck breaks down, and Troy meets its owner: an alcoholic drifter named Zap Rowsdower. The two are able to get the truck to run again, and Zap warms up to Troy as they head to a nearby town. Upon arriving at a gas station to refuel, Zap phones the police to report finding Troy. As he does this, the cultists slowly approach them and begin to pursue them by vehicle into the countryside, where Zap and Troy are able to lose them.

Later that night, Zap reveals to Troy that the cult are known as the Ziox, as well as details about his own life before becoming a vagabond. The next morning, the truck stalls, and the two are left with no other option than to walk the rest of the way back to civilization, unaware that the cultists are still in pursuit. The two wander through the countryside and through a hidden cave. They find themselves pursued by the cult again as this leads them to the lodge of a shotgun-wielding hermit, Mike Pipper. A tear in Rowsdower's jacket reveals he has one of the cultists' signature tattoos. Before Pipper can open fire on him, Rowsdower calls Troy by his surname, pleading for help. Pipper, recognizing the name, reveals that he was a close friend as well as an expedition partner of Thomas' and has been hiding in the woods from Satoris for the past seven years. He later explains that the cultists are the last descendants of an ancient and advanced race called the Ziox, who inhabited the area long before the Indians, and whose civilization was destroyed by their god in a month-long rainstorm after they turned to worshiping an unholy idol. According to Pipper, the Ziox built a great city that was more advanced than "anything the ancient Egyptians or Romans ever knew", but which sank into the ground due to the flooding. He believes that Satoris wants to make a sacrifice to the idol in the belief that it will restore power to the Ziox, and raise an army of the dead which will allow him to conquer/rule the entire world; but according to legend, "if the idol is ever destroyed, the city will return to its former glory". After Zap leaves the two, Pipper confides to Troy that Rowsdower was with the cult the night Troy's father was killed and that Zap may have possibly been the one that killed him. In a dream sequence, Rowsdower relives the night the cult's insignia was branded on his arm, like the other cultists. Satoris seems to be able to torment Rowsdower through the mark, as we see Rowsdower writhing in agony while asleep, presumably having a Satoris-induced nightmare.

Troy is captured by Satoris, who uses the map to locate their ancient idol. Satoris means to make Troy the titular final sacrifice. Pipper gives Rowsdower his horse and a rifle, directing him to the ancient Ziox sacrifice site that he was able to decipher from Troy's map. Rowsdower discovers the site of the idol and duels with Satoris. During the fight, Satoris mocks Rowsdower with the fact that he could not bring himself to kill Troy's father, implying Satoris had to do it himself. Satoris is about to kill Rowsdower when Troy manages to intervene, shooting the cult leader. Satoris' death causes the destruction of the idol. With the idol destroyed, the lost city of the Ziox does indeed rise from the ground, and Satoris' cult breaks up as its members are freed from his evil influence. Troy and Rowsdower observe the rise of the lost city, then drive off together.

== Cast ==
- Bruce J. Mitchell as Zap Rowsdower
- Christian Malcolm as Troy McGreggor
- Shane Marceau as Satoris
- Ron Anderson as Mike Pipper
- Bharbara Egan as Aunt Betty
- Randy Vasseur as Thomas McGreggor

== Production ==
The Final Sacrifice was the project of film student Tjardus Greidanus, who was enrolled in the filmmaker program at the Southern Alberta Institute of Technology. The film was completed with a budget of approximately CA$1,500 using school cameras. Christian Malcolm, who starred as Troy, was a fellow student of Greidanus and co-wrote the screenplay. Filming took place in Water Valley, Alberta, and Cremona, Alberta.

Since making the film, Greidanus has gained success as a director of making-of documentaries, including several for the films of Michael Mann. Malcolm has continued working on stage and screen, and Mitchell continued as a stage actor and musician until his April 2018 death.

== Home media ==
The Final Sacrifice was released under the title of Quest for the Lost City on VHS and LaserDisc.

=== Mystery Science Theater 3000 ===
The film was featured on Mystery Science Theater 3000 (MST3K) as experiment #910, which debuted on the Sci-Fi Channel on July 25, 1998. The Final Sacrifice was one of seven 1990s-era films showcased on the series during its original run. In the episode, Mike Nelson, Tom Servo, and Crow T. Robot poke fun at the film's characters (mostly Troy McGreggor and Zap Rowsdower) and Canadian stereotypes. Writer/performer Mary Jo Pehl especially mocks Zap Rowsdower, writing, "You know what? You lose me straight away when your movie's protagonist is named 'Zap Rowsdower'. ... Zap was clearly supposed to be the intermediary guy; the hard-drinking, tough-but-lovable, car-won't-start sidekick to the hero. However, we were short one hero, and its not till the end of the movie that you realize that ... Zap is the hero."

The episode finished fourth in a poll of MST3K Season 11 Kickstarter backers, which qualified it to be one of six episodes chosen to appear on the MST3K 2016 Turkey Day Marathon. Writer Jim Vorel chose the episode as the series' best (Note: Ranking based on 197 episodes as of 2018.) in his rankings of the first 12 seasons of MST3K. Vorel calls "Zap Rowsdower ... the dumbest, and thereby most unforgettable name in cinema history" and calls Troy "snarling-faced" and "Larry Csonka-worshiping [and] irritating." According to Vorel, "Every minute of screen time is packed to the gills with more memorable moments than you can possibly summarize."

The episode featuring the film was included in the Mystery Science Theater 3000: Volume XVII DVD collection by Shout Factory on March 16, 2010. The disc of episode #910 includes an interview with Bruce J. Mitchell discussing the film and the MST3K treatment. This DVD has been out of print since 2017, but returned to streaming in November 2024.
