= The Final Fix =

2020 documentary film

- Promotional poster for The Final Fix
- Directed by: Norman Stone
- Produced by: Steve Talbott; Richard Bedser
- Starring: Eric Clapton; Pete Townshend; Meg Patterson
- Narrated by: Ewan McGregor
- Cinematography: Francis Hellyer; Phil Sheerin
- Edited by: Roddy Buxton
- Music by: Ben Bartlett
- Production companies: G2 Media; The Final Fix Ltd
- Distributed by: Independent (Amazon Prime Video)
- Release date: 2020
- Running time: 88 minutes
- Country: United Kingdom
- Language: English

The Final Fix is a 2020 British documentary film directed by Norman Stone and narrated by Ewan McGregor. The film examines the development and reception of Neuro-Electric Therapy (NET), a non-pharmacological method for treating substance addiction that was developed by Scottish surgeon Dr. Meg Patterson.

The documentary covers the history of the treatment, its use by public figures such as Eric Clapton, and the challenges faced by proponents of NET in seeking medical and regulatory recognition. It was released on streaming platforms including Amazon Prime Video and was screened at several international film festivals.

== Synopsis ==
The film uses archival material, interviews, and narration to trace the origins of Neuro-Electric Therapy (NET). It begins in the early 1970s in Hong Kong, where Dr. Meg Patterson was working as a surgeon and began exploring the use of electroacupuncture to relieve pain. Her research led to the development of a small, non-invasive device—nicknamed the "Black Box"—which used specific electrical frequencies in an effort to alleviate withdrawal symptoms associated with opioid addiction.

One segment focuses on Patterson’s treatment of musician Eric Clapton in 1974 for heroin addiction. The film presents his reported recovery as a pivotal moment that brought wider media attention to the therapy. It also includes testimonies about other individuals who have undergone NET, including Pete Townshend and Boy George.

The documentary portrays the therapy's trajectory as one of continued resistance from mainstream medicine and regulatory institutions. According to the film, although the NET device received limited FDA clearance, its adoption has been minimal, with the medical establishment favoring pharmaceutical-based interventions.

== Themes ==
The documentary centers on the "David vs. Goliath" dynamic between non-pharmacological innovators and the established pharmaceutical industry. The film argues that Neuro-Electric Therapy has been marginalized not due to lack of efficacy, but due to a systemic bias in medical research funding that favors pharmaceutical interventions.

This narrative is supported by broader academic research into "sponsorship bias." A 2017 Cochrane Review found that industry-sponsored studies are significantly more likely to produce favorable results for the sponsor's product than independent studies. Additionally, an investigation by the Center for Public Integrity found that pharmaceutical companies spent over $880 million on lobbying between 2006 and 2015 to influence opioid-related legislation, creating significant barriers for alternative treatments.

== Production ==
The Final Fix was directed by Norman Stone, an Emmy and BAFTA Award-winning filmmaker best known for works such as Shadowlands. It was produced by Steve Talbott and Richard Bedser. The film features narration by actor Ewan McGregor, with original music composed by Ben Bartlett.

The cinematography was led by Francis Hellyer and Phil Sheerin, and the film was edited by Roddy Buxton. The production was a collaboration between G2 Media and The Final Fix Ltd.

The documentary includes interviews with Dr. Patterson’s family, medical professionals familiar with the device, and individuals who have undergone the treatment. According to the filmmakers, the documentary was intended to introduce NET to a wider audience during an ongoing public health crisis related to opioid addiction.

Director Norman Stone described the project as an effort to "tell the truth about a treatment that has been too easily dismissed" and to "offer hope to a new generation struggling with addiction." Producer Steve Talbott said the film aimed to revive awareness of a "forgotten legacy" of medical innovation from Scotland.

== Reception ==
The film received positive coverage in independent media outlets and was featured in the Scottish press at the time of its release.

=== Critical response ===
- The Herald covered the film's release and contextualized it within the ongoing opioid crisis in the United States and rising drug-related deaths in Scotland. The newspaper referred to NET as a Scottish innovation with potential to contribute to addiction treatment.
- UK Film Review awarded the film 4 out of 5 stars, describing it as a "gripping documentary" and praising its narrative structure and emotional impact. The review also commented on the portrayal of resistance from the medical establishment to the adoption of NET.
- Movieguide described the documentary as "compelling" and noted its exploration of non-traditional approaches to addiction recovery, alongside a presentation of the personal and spiritual aspects of the therapy.
- The Daily Record covered the film's release, describing it as a documentary that "sheds light on an electric cure for addiction once used on rock legends like Eric Clapton and Boy George." The article emphasized the film's relevance during the ongoing opioid crisis and highlighted the filmmakers' intent to reignite interest in a controversial therapy with historical roots in Scottish medicine.

=== Accolades ===
The film received recognition on the international festival circuit:

- Winner: Best Documentary – Lonely Wolf: London International Film Festival (2020)
- Winner: Award of Merit – Accolade Global Film Competition (2020). The competition described the film as "well-paced, informative and alarming," and praised Stone's direction.

== See also ==
- Cranial electrotherapy stimulation
- Meg Patterson
