= Far Out: Life On & After the Commune =

Far Out: Life On & After the Commune is a 2024 documentary film which explores the founding and history of two communes in rural New England. Directed by Charles Light of Green Mountain Post Films.

Aside from original music composed and performed by Patty Carpenter and the Dysfunctional Family Jazz Band, Far Out includes music from Jackson Browne, John Hall, Country Joe McDonald, Graham Nash, Bonnie Raitt, Pete Seeger, Carly Simon, Steven Stills, James Taylor, Jesse Colin Young, and others.
