= Families Empowered and Supporting Treatment of Eating Disorders =

US-based non-profit organization

Families Empowered and Supporting Treatment of Eating Disorders (F.E.A.S.T.) is an international 501(c)(3) organization created by and for families who are helping loved ones recover from eating disorders. F.E.A.S.T. promotes evidence-based treatment to reduce the suffering associated with eating disorders such as anorexia nervosa (A.N.), bulimia nervosa (B.N.), and eating disorders not otherwise specified (E.D.N.O.S.). The organization provides information, mutual support, and advocates for research and education on behalf of families.

F.E.A.S.T.'s primary focus is helping families and caregivers. The organization does not offer treatment advice to patients, in the belief that patient safety requires this to be the responsibility of families working in conjunction with licensed clinical specialists in eating disorders treatment. F.E.A.S.T.'s Advisory Panel is composed of internationally recognized leaders in research and treatment of eating disorders, and from eating disorders support organizations around the world.

F.E.A.S.T. is dedicated to remaining independent and family-focused. Donations are accepted from individuals only. Advertisements or sponsorships from eating disorder treatment clinics and providers, as well as monetary contributions from business concerns who sell or provide services to families, are declined by the organization.

The F.E.A.S.T. Eating Disorders Glossary is included as a reference tool by the U.S. National Library of Medicine (MedlinePlus) and the Academy for Eating Disorders.

== See also ==
- Eating Disorders Coalition
- National Eating Disorders Association

== External list ==
- Official website
