= Fish Above Sea Level =

- Theatrical release poster
- Directed by: Hazim Bitar
- Written by: Hazim Bitar
- Produced by: Hazim Bitar
- Starring: Abdallah Dghemaal; Rabee Zureikat
- Cinematography: Hazim Bitar
- Edited by: Hazim Bitar
- Music by: Aziz Maraqa
- Production company: Tashkeel Films
- Distributed by: Hazim Bitar (JO)
- Release date: 29 June 2011 (Jordan)
- Running time: 80 minutes
- Country: Jordan
- Languages: Arabic; English Subtitles

Fish Above Sea Level (Arabic: سمك فوق سطح البحر, translit. Samak fawqa satah al-bahr) is an independent 2011 drama film directed and written by Hazim Bitar. Leading Jordanian film critic Adnan Madanat called the film "The best Jordanian feature film."

== Synopsis ==
Fish Above Sea Level is about Talal (Rabee Zureikat) a young Ammani professional, who discovers upon his father's death that he is penniless. His late father, in an attempt to shore up his failing investments, mortgaged the family house. Talal has few days to save the family house in Amman from foreclosure. His only way out is to sell a farm house once owned by his late father in a village by the Dead Sea with a dark past. At the village he meets Dawoud (Abdallah Dghemaat) a young farmer who lives in the farm house. Before Talal can do anything with the farm house, Dawoud's approval is essential.

== Main Film Festivals ==
- African Diaspora Film Festival 2011
- Hollywood Black Film Festival 2011
