= Fog Warning =

- Directed by: Christopher Ward
- Written by: Christopher Ward
- Produced by: Marty Lang; Jeffrey Marvin
- Starring: Michael Barra; Elise Rovinsky; Cuyle Carvin; Alice Snow Johnson
- Cinematography: Alan McIntyre Smith
- Edited by: Richard Byard
- Music by: Jeff Preston
- Distributed by: iTunes
- Release date: August 16, 2008 (Fright Night Film Festival)
- Running time: 103 minutes
- Country: United States
- Language: English

Fog Warning is a 2008 American independent physiological thriller horror film written and directed by Christopher Ward in New Haven, Connecticut.

== Plot ==
When a series of gruesome murders start plaguing a small New England town, people suspect it's a vampire. Ronny (Michael Barra), manager of a local comic book store and, decides to kidnap Anna (Elise Rovinsky), a woman who he believes is with Satan. He locks her up in the attic of the historical home. He's joined by two thugs, Karl (Cuyle Carvin) and Eddie (Joe Kathrein), who enjoy tormenting the woman until she confesses that she's the vampire. All they want is a confession Ronny can record to sell to the media, however the captive alarms them with odd behavior. Their dreams of becoming rich and famous turn into a violent nightmare.

== Cast ==
- Michael Barra as Ronny
- Elise Rovinsky as Anna
- Cuyle Carvin as Karl
- Alice Snow Johnson as Linda
- Joe Kathrein as Eddie
- Madeline Reed as Detective Powell
- Marty Lang as Detective
- Jacqueline Shea as Trudy 'Trippy' Miller

Additional cast

- Ashley Bates as Woman in Car,
- David Michaels as Art Gallery Waiter
- Gary Ploski as Gas Station Attendant
- Lou Ursone as Wino

== Reception ==
Although the film has not had its theatrical release, it has been shown at film festivals and has received a mostly positive response. Nic Brown of B Movie Man wrote, "Writer/director Christopher Ward has brings an interesting twist to the vampire tale...", and "If you are looking for an intelligent thriller that will keep you guessing, then check out Christopher Ward’s FOG WARNING", while after its screening the Fright Night Film Festival, while praising Christopher for being a 2001 Emmy winner.
