= Feast (2021 film) =

2021 Dutch film

- Directed by: Tim Leyendekker
- Written by: Tim Leyendekker; Gerardjan Rijnders
- Produced by: André Schreuders; Marc Thelosen
- Starring: Eelco Smits; Trudi Klever
- Cinematography: Benito Strangio
- Edited by: Tim Leyendekker; Matte Mourik
- Release date: 3 February 2021
- Running time: 84 minutes
- Country: Netherlands
- Language: Dutch

Feast is a 2021 Dutch drama film directed by Tim Leyendekker. The film is based on a real-life crime case that happened in the Dutch city of Groningen in 2007, Where at a party multiple unconscious gay men were injected with the HIV-virus. It premiered at the International Film Festival Rotterdam.

== Awards and nominations ==
Year	Result	Award	Category	Ref.
2021	Nominated	International Film Festival Rotterdam	Tiger Award	
2021	Won	Cinéma du Réel	CNAP Award	
2021	Won	Vilnius International Film Festival	Special Mention	
