= 1989 in Italian television =

This is a list of Italian television related events from 1989.

== Events ==
=== RAI ===
- 25 February: Anna Oxa and Fausto Leali win the Sanremo festival with Ti lascerò. The hosting, entrusted to four young sons of art (Rosita Celentano, Paola Dominguin, Danny Quinn and Gianmarco Tognazzi), completely inexperienced, a sketch, judged blasphemous, by the Marchesini-Solenghi-Lopez trio and the virulent intervention of Beppe Grillo, cause much quarrels.
- 20 March: the last episode of La piovra 4, with the killing of Corrado Cattani, the hero of the series, gets 17.2 million viewers, an absolute record for an Italian fiction.
- 7 April: Adriano Celentano returns to television, for the first time since Fantastico, as a guest of Pippo Baudo at Serata d'onore. Immediately, the singer sparked a new controversy, for his stance against abortion.
- 30 April: debut of Chi l'ha visto? ; already in the first episode, a missing person is found. The American soldier Jennifer Muir, who fled from a NATO base for sentimental reasons, telephones the studio answering the appeal made live by her father.
- 24 May: the 1989 European Cup Final Milan-Steaua is the most watched program of the year, with 19.673 million viewers.
- 4 June: the Beijing correspondent Ilairo Fiore witnesses for Rai the Tien An Men Square massacre.
- 9 November: the TG2 special correspondent Lilli Gruber (German native speaker) describes, for RAI, the fall of the Berlin Wall and the following events.
- 10 November : RAI director general Biagio Agnes, a left-wing Catholic, resigns. For months he had been the target of a press campaign, accused of bad management and excessive spending.
- 12 November: RAI 1 broadcasts the first episode of The betrothred (see below). Realized with a 20 billion liras budget, in coproduction with Bayerischer Rundfunk and the Croatian television, the series gets high ratings in Italy; it is instead ravaged by critics, who reproach it the infidelity to the book, transformed into a cloak and dagger story, and the mediocrity of the two lead actors.

== Awards ==
6. Telegatto Award, for the season 1988–1989.

- Man and woman of the year: Marco Columbro and Marisa Laurito; Piero Chiambretti as revelation of the year.
- Best TV show :Biberon.
- Best TV movie: La piovra 4
- Best serial: Big man (for Italy) and Dynasty (for abroad).
- Best miniseries: La romana
- Best spot: Associazione nazionale Lega Handicappati.
- Best quiz: Telemike.
- Best game show: Tra moglie e marito.
- Best variety: Odiens.
- Best talk show : Maurizio Costanzo show
- Best educational: Alla ricerca dell'arca.
- Best news program: Linea diretta.
- Best music show: International D.O.C. club
- Best sport magazine: La domenica sportiva.
- Best show for children: Big.
- Best title track : C'è da spostare una macchina by Francesco Salvi.
- Awards for the foreign TV: Juan Lisiard, (France), Suscè (UK), Gudrun Landgrebe (Germany).
- Special awards: Telelombardia (best local channel), Mrs. Lucia Baldi (reader of Sorrisi e canzoni TV), Happy days, Fame, Loving (for having gotten 500 episodes), Emilio.

== Debuts ==
=== Rai ===
==== Variety ====
- Mattina 2, then Unomattina in famiglia – morning show of the weekend by Michele Guardì, with various hosts; again on air, it has generated some spin-offs.
- Ci vediamo - morning show, with Claudio Lippi; 3 seasons.
- Piacere Raiuno – midday traveling show, from the Italian provincial towns, with Toto Cotugno, Piero Badaloni, Simona Marchini and then Gigi Sabani.
- Lascia o raddoppia? – unlucky remake of the legendary quiz of the Fifties, with Bruno Gambarotta and Lando Buzzanca ; 2 seasons.
- Gli antennati – care of Nicoletta Leggeri; 2 seasons. Satire of television, based on the comic editing of the material from the RAI archive.

==== News and educational ====
- Caramella – tutorial with entertainment moments, aimed to the parents of young children, with Pieralvise Zorzi; 3 seasons.
- Donnavventura – travel program with an entirely female cast; again on air, after being migrated to Mediaset and Sky.

RAI 3, directed by literary critic Angelo Guglielmi, stands out for its sometimes discussed, but nevertheless innovative programs.

- Blob, di tutto di più – daily column showing the worst of the day in television, care of Enrico Ghezzi and Marco Giusti; very acclaimed by critics for its satirical use of editing, it's still on the air.
- Chi l'ha visto? - true crime program, hosted by Donatella Raffai and many others (actually by Federica Sciarelli); again on air.
- I racconti del 113 (113's stories) real TV program, following the daily work of the police in Rome, by Gilberto Squizzato, 2 seasons.
- Cartolina (Postcard) – daily column by Andrea Barbato, consisting of a five minutes open letter addressed to a personality of politics or everyday life; five seasons.
- Fluff, processo alla tv (The TV on trial) – magazine about television, always with Andrea Barbato; 2 seasons.

=== Fininvest ===
==== Serials ====
- Chiara e gli altri – by Andrea Barzini and Gianfrancesco Lazotti, with Ottavia Piccolo and Alessandro Haber; 2 seasons.
- I-taliani – sitcom with Trettré; 2 seasons. It's a series of satirical sketch, without fixed characters.
- Classe di ferro by Bruno Corbucci, with Massimo Reale, Paolo Sassanelli and Rocco Papaleo; 2 seasons.

==== Variety ====
- Emilio – comic variety, set in an imaginary newsroom, with Athina Cenci, Zuzzurro e Gaspare, Silvio Orlando and Teo Teocoli; 2 seasons.
- Buon pomeriggio – afternoon show, aimed to the female public, hosted by Patrizia Rossetti; 5 seasons.
- Bellezze al bagno (Bathing beauties) – game show, aired in the summer from the most famous Italian water parks; 5 seasons.
- Sabato al circo (Saturday at the circus) – hosted by Gigi e Andrea and others; 5 seasons.
- Una rotonda sul mare (A gazebo on the sea) – music show, hosted by Red Ronnie, tribute to the summer tunes of the Sixties; 2 editions.
- C'era una volta il festival – contest among the best songs in the Sanremo festival history, hosted by Mike Bongiorno; 2 seasons.
- Zio Tibia Picture Show – festival of horror film and serials, presented by Uncle Creepy's puppet; 2 seasons.

===== People shows =====
- Agenzia matrimoniale (Marriage agency) – people show, hosted by Marta Flavi (by then wife of the producer Maurizio Costanzo) and later by Barbara D'Urso; 9 seasons. In every episode, two lonely hearts have a blind date in front of the cameras.
- C'eravamo tanto amati (Once we loved each other so much) – talk-show, hosted by Luca Barbareschi; 5 seasons. The program, forerunner of the future trash-TV, is focused on the angry quarrels (largely staged) of couples in crisis; despite its bad taste, it gets public success and has an American version (That's amore).
- Cerco e offro - talk show with people offering and seeking work; care of Maurzio Costanzo, 2 seasons.

==== News and educational ====
- Radio Londra - column with Giuliano Ferrara; 3 seasons.
- Guida al campionato (Guide to Serie A) – football magazine, hosted by Sandro Piccinini and others; lasted till 2012.
- Calciomania – football magazine, with Cesare Cadeo and Maurizio Mosca; 3 seasons.

=== Other channels ===
- Appunti disordinati di viaggio (Disordered travel sketches) – travel program, hosted by Andrea Gris; 6 seasons (Telemontecarlo).
- Vernice fresca – cabaret hosted by Carlo Conti; 6 seasons. It launches Tuscan stand-up comedians as Giorgio Panariello and Leonardo Pieraccioni (Cinquestelle).
- Campo base, il mondo dell'avventura – adventure magazine, with Ambrogio Fogar; 3 seasons (TV Koper, then Tele+2).

=== International ===
- (United States) Max Headroom (RAI 3)
- (United States) Hunter (RAI 2)
- (United States) Batman (Italia 1)

== Television shows ==
=== Rai ===
==== Comedy ====
- Allacciate le cinture di sicurezza (Fasten your seat belts) with the trio Marchesini-Solenghi-Lopez, parody of Othello, The cherry orchard and Agatha Christiie's plays, with a willingly absurd plot.
- E se poi se ne vanno? (If they leave home actually) –, by Giorgio Capitani, with Turi Ferro and Virna Lisi; sequel of ... e non se ne vogliono andare.
- Una casa a Roma (A house in Rome) – by Bruno Cortini, with Thomas Millian and Valerie Perine.

==== Drama ====
- Una donna spezzata – by Marco Leto, from Simone de Beauvoir's La femme rompue, with Lea Massari and Erland Josephson, in 2 parts. A middle-class woman has to face the crumbling of her seemingly happy family.
- Quattro storie di donne (Four women's stories) – cycle of TV-movie (Emma by Carlo Lizzani with Mariangela Melato, Carla by Dino Risi with Gudrun Landgrebe, Luisa by Franco Giraldi with Senta Berger, Rose by Tomaso Sherman with Valerie Perrine) showing the evolution of woman in Italy from the Fifties to the Eighties.
- Una lepre con la faccia da bambina (A hare with a child's face) – by Gianni Serra, from the Laura Conti's novel about the Seveso disaster, with Franca Rame, Gianni Cavina and Lydia Alfonsi.
- Marco e Laura dieci anni fa (Ten years ago) by Carlo Tuzii, with Christian Vadim and Mapi Galan; a love story with the movement of 1977 on the background.
- Uomo contro uomo (Man vs. man) – by Sergio Sollima, with Christopher Bucholz and Barbara De Rossi, in 2 parts. It's the story of a men of honor in the Calabrian 'ndrangheta and of his sister, a teacher enemy of the organized crime.
- Il colpo (The heist) - by Sauro Scavolini, with Fabio Testi, Luigi Diberti and Marcel Bozzuffi.
- The jeweler's shop – by Michael Anderson, from the Karol Woytila's play, with Burt Lancaster and Olivia Hussey.
- Sound – by Biagio Proietti, with Peter Fonda and Elena Sofia Ricci. The life of a space engineer is turned upside down by a message from the sky.

==== Miniseries ====
- Come stanno bene insieme (How well they fit together) – by Vittorio Sindoni, with Sergio Castellitto and Stefania Sandrelli; 3 episodes. It's the story of thirty years in the life of a couple, from the falling in love and the marriage to the separation and the reconciliation.
- La piovra 4 by Luigi Perelli, with Michele Placido, Patricia Millardet and Remo Girone (see over).
- Affari di famiglia (Family affairs) by Marcello Fondato; 6 episodes. Love triangle among a man (Jean Sorel) and two sisters (Florinda Bolkan and Catherine Spaak) in the Italian upper class.
- Appuntamento a Trieste by Bruno Mattei, from the Giorgio Scerbanenco's novel, with Tony Musante; a story of love and espionage, set in post-war Trieste; 3 episodes.
- Io Jane, tu Tarzan – musical comedy by Enzo Trapani, with Carmen Russo, Franco and Ciccio and Nino Manfredi; 4 episodes.
- Rally - sporting miniseries by Sergio Martino with Giuliano Gemma.
- (France) Chateauvallon

===== Period dramas =====
- I promessi sposi (The Betrothed) – by Salvatore Nocita, adapted from Alessandro Manzoni's novel The Betrothed, with Danny Quinn and Delphine Forest as protagonists and a stellar cast in the minor roles (Alberto Sordi, Burt Lancaster, F. Murray Abraham, Franco Nero, Dario Fo); in 5 episodes.
- Modì, vita di Amedeo Modigliani (Life of Amedeo Modigliani) – by Franco Brogi Taviani, with Richard Berry in the title role; 3 episodes.
- The last days of Pompei, by Peter Hunt, from the Edward Bulwer-Lytton's novel, with Nicholas Clay, Olivia Hussey and Franco Nero; 4 episodes.

==== Serials ====
- Passioni – soap-opera, with Elisabetta Viviani and Carlo Hintermann.
- È proibito ballare (Dancing forbidden) – sitcom set in a jazz club, by Fabrizio Costa and Cesare Bastelli, supervision by Pupi Avati. with Nestor Garay and Arnaldo Ninchi.
- Stazione di servizio (The filling station) – sit-com by Felice Farina, with Marco Messeri.
- Il vigile urbano (The traffic policeman) – by Castellano & Pipolo, with Lino Banfi.

==== Variety ====
- Ars Amanda – malicious talk show, hosted by Amanda Lear, set in a bed where the singer and her guests chats about eroticism.
- Prove tecniche di trasmissione (Technical transmission tests), with Piero Chiambretti, broadcast from a circus tent outside a stadium where a Serie A match is played.
- Uno su cento – with Pippo Baudo; contest to choose the most popular Italian personality (the winners are Giulio Andreotti and Alberto Sordi.)
- L'amore è una cosa meravigliosa (Love Is a Many-Splendored Thing) – talk-show about love, hosted by Sandra Milo.
- Chiappala chiappala with Giorgio Bracardi.
- Il sicario (The hitman) – game show hosted by Gino La Monica.
- Stasera Lino - with Lino Banfi and Heather Parisi.
- Sulla cresta dell'onda - with Edwige Fenech.

==== News and educational ====
- La notte della repubblica (The night of the republic) – by Sergio Zavoli; monumental enquiry in 18 episodes about the Years of lead, with precious witnesses of many protagonists of the tragic season, politicians or terrorists.
- Napoli, stagione dell'anima (Naples, season of the soul) – documentary by Paolo Jono; 10 episodes.
- Rosso di sera - column with Paolo Guzzanti.

=== Fininvest ===
==== Drama and comedy ====
- Amori: cycle of TV movies directed by renowned directors. It includes Il vizio di vivere, by Dino Risi; The tenth one in hiding by Lina Wertmuller, from Giovanni Guareschi with Piera Degli Esposti and Dominique Sanda; La moglie ingenua e il marito malato (The naïve wife and the ill husband) by Mario Monicelli, from Achille Campanile, with Fernando Rey and Stefania Sandrelli; Mano rubata by Alberto Lattuada (last work), from Tommaso Landolfi; Gioco di società by Nanni Loy; Cinema by Luigi Magni.
- La bugiarda (The deceitful woman) by Franco Giraldi, from the Diego Fabbri's piece, with Francesca Dellera.
- Running away by Dino Risi, from Alberto Moravia's novel Two women, with Sophia Loren (in the same role played in the 1960 film) and Sydney Penny.
- La trappola (The trap) by Carlo Lizzani, from the novel Selina by Mino Milani, with Johnny Dorelli, Mario Aforf and Florinda Bolkan; an Italian businessman is involved in a spy story.

===== Horror =====
- Brivido giallo - cycle of four horror TV-movies, directed by Lamberto Bava (Dinner with a vampire, Graveyard disturbance, Until death, The ogre).

Other cycles of horror movies are produced but not broadcast because judged too violent and are released only years later, in the local circuits or in home video.

- Le case maledette – cycle of movies about the theme of the haunted house, (La casa dei sortilegi and La casa delle anime erranti by Umberto Lenzi, The house of clocks and The sweet house of horrors by Lucio Fulci)
- Alta tensione, cyvle of thrillers directed by Lamberto Bava (Il gioko, L'uomo che non voleva morire, Il maestro del terrore, Testimone oculare).
- I maestri del brivido (Massacre by Andrea Bianchi).
- I maestri del thriller (Le porte dell'inferno by Umberto Lenzi).

==== Miniseries ====
- Disperatamente Giulia by Enrico Maria Salerno, with Tahnee Welch, Fabio Testi and Dalila Di Lazzaro; 6 episodes. Melodrama about the long-life love story between a female writer and a surgeon.
- Il ricatto (Blackmail) – by Tonino Valeri, Ruggero Deodato and Vittorio De Sisti, with Massimo Ranieri; 5 episodes and a sequel. A postal police chief conducts a private investigation to avenge his brother.
- Tutti in palestra (Everybody to the gym) comedy by Vittorio De Sisti, with Jenny Tamburi; 3 episodes.

==== Serial ====
- Valentina - from the Guido Crepax's comics, with Demetra Hampton.
- Cristina – sequel of Arriva Cristina, with Cristina D'Avena.
- Ovidio – sit-com by Paolo Pietrangeli, with Maurizio Costanzo as an Italian wine-seller migrated in Munich.

==== Variety ====
- Finalmente venerdì (Friday, at least) – with Johnny Dorelli and Heather Parisi; one of the most sumptuous variety ever produced by Fininvest.
- Televiggiù – satirical variety by Enrico Vaime, with Gianfranco D'Angelo, set in an imaginary local television.
- Trisitors – with Trettrè playing three aliens visiting the Fininvest studios.

===== Quiz and game shows =====
- Per la strada - traveling quiz with competitors chosen at random from the audience, hosted by Marco Balestri.
- Casa mia – game show with two families as contestants, with Lino Toffolo and Gino Riveccio.
- Il principe azzurro (The charming prince) – game show, hosted by Raffaella Carrà, aimed to choose the ideal man among the contenders.

==== News and educational ====
- Il mondo del terrore (World of terror) – enquiry about Italian and international terrorism, by Giorgio Bocca.
- Visita medica - medical magazine, with Pier Gildo Bianchi.

=== Other channels ===
- Caffè Italia – magazine about Italian pop music, with Gianni De Berardinis (Odeon TV).
- Quattro carogne a Malopasso – amateurish spaghetti-western directed by the Sicilian quarrier Vito Colomba and broadcast on the Trapani channel TRC, infamous as example of trash-movie.

== Ending this year ==
- Aboccaperta
- Buona fortuna
- C'est la vie
- Calcio spettacolo
- Cocco!
- D.O.C.: musica e altro a denominazione d'origine controllata
- Discoring
- Paroliamo
- Piccoli fans
- Quark
- I ragazzi della 3. C
- Tuttinfamiglia
- La TV delle ragazze
- Va' pensiero
- Videobox

== Deaths ==
- 4 January : Pino Calvi, musician, 58.
- 10 March: Maurizio Merli, actor, 49.
- 12 August: Olga Villi, actress, 67.
- 29 September: Gianni Santuccio, actor, 78.
- 1 October: Carlo Dapporto, comic actor, 78.
- 2 October: Vittorio Caprioli, actor, 68.
- 5 November: Enzo Trapani, TV shows director, 67, suicide.
- 17 December: Luciano Salce, actor, director and TV presenter, 67
