= Roberto Pedicini =

Italian voice actor

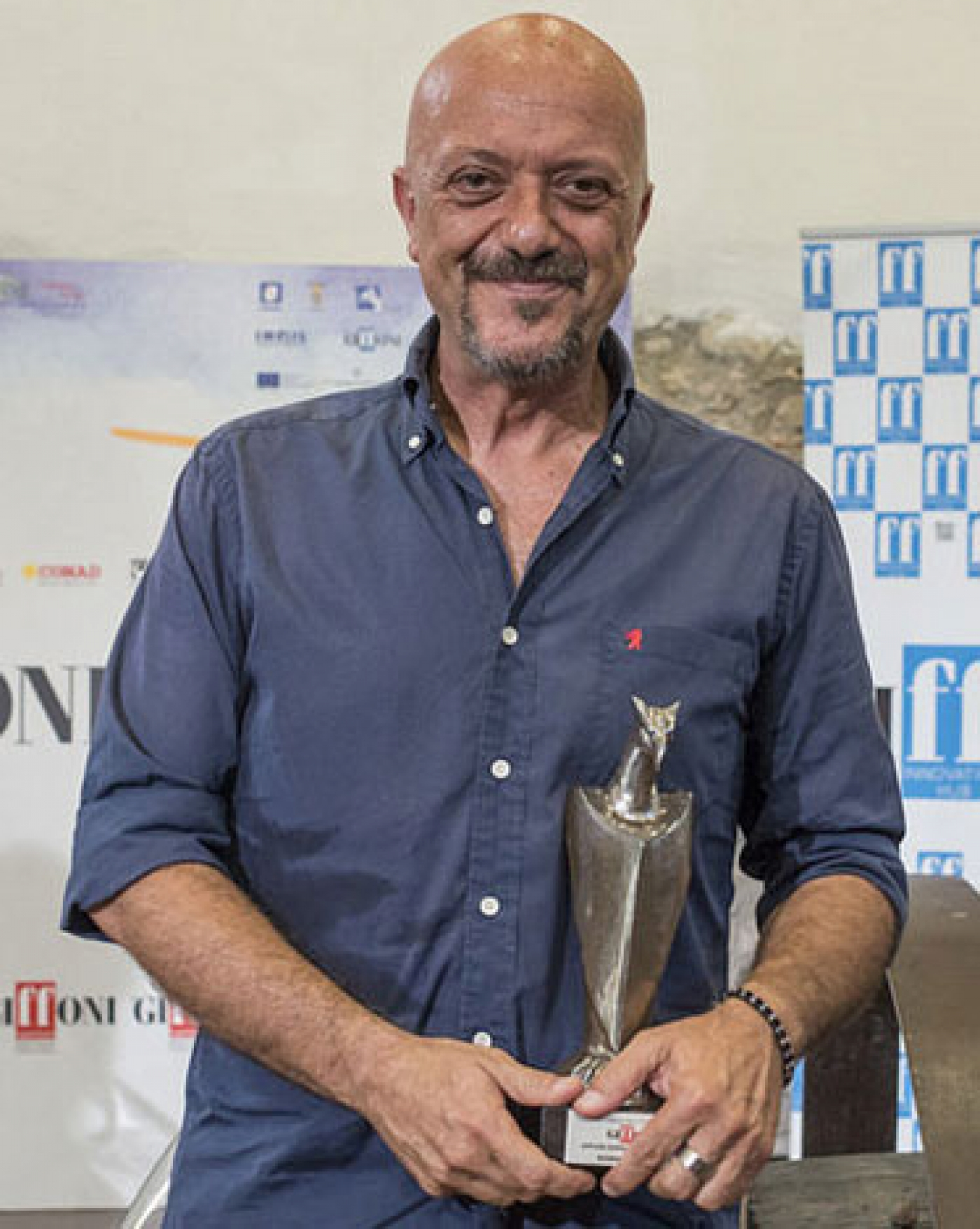
- Pedicini in 2021
- Born: 18 January 1962 (age 64); Benevento, Italy
- Occupations: Actor; voice actor; acting coach; dialogue coach; dubbing director
- Years active: 1980–present
- Spouse: Desirée Noferini (divorced)

Roberto Pedicini (born 18 January 1962) is an Italian actor and voice actor.

== Biography ==
Born in Benevento from humble parents, Pedicini and his family moved to Pescara when he was young. Still a teenager, he made most of his living as a wandering street performer, singing while accompanying himself with the guitar, also working as a radio host. In 1980, he moved to Rome pursuing a career in acting and dubbing. He was soon cast as a voice actor in many roles, while his onscreen acting debut happened 8 years later, in Lamberto Bava's horror cable series Brivido Giallo.

Pedicini is thus best known as a voice dubber, serving as the official Italian voice actor of Kevin Spacey and Jim Carrey; he also regularly dubs Woody Harrelson, Javier Bardem, Ralph Fiennes, Temuera Morrison and Ricky Gervais in most of their movies. He has provided voice acting work for the radio industry, TV commercials, film trailers and audiobooks.

Pedicini has dubbed both Sylvester the Cat and the Tasmanian Devil from 1996 until 2022 and has been the official Italian voice of Goofy since 1999 (replacing Vittorio Amandola), as well as dubbing Timon in most of his cartoon appearances, Phoebus in The Hunchback of Notre Dame, Hopper in A Bug's Life and Gaston in Beauty and the Beast, also voicing Scarpa/Rocko the Burglar in the Italian animated film How the Toys Saved Christmas. He has even dubbed characters in video games.

In 1999, Pedicini was awarded a Nastro d'Argento for Best Dubbing due to his contribution to the Italian-dubbed edition of Woody Allen's film Celebrity, where he provided Kenneth Branagh's dub voice as Lee Simon, and Peter Weir's The Truman Show, having dubbed Jim Carrey in the role of Truman Burbank.

In 2015, Pedicini took part in Jordan Ledy's documentary about the Italian dubbing industry, It's Better in Italian, and performed Stanley Kubrick's off-screen voice in S Is for Stanley. Since 2018 he has announced the David di Donatello awards ceremony.

== Filmography ==
=== Television ===
Year	Title	Role(s)	Notes
1987	Night Shift	Painter	TV series, 2nd episode
1988	Brivido Giallo: Until Death	Luca	TV film
1989	Brivido Giallo: Dinner with a Vampire	a director	TV film
2006	Father Matthew	Bonetti	TV Series, episode 5x09
2008	The Teacher	Alvaro Roncati	TV Series, episode 1x07
2011	Fratelli detective	nurse	TV Series
2016	Boris Giuliano - Un poliziotto a Palermo	Umberto Madia	TV Miniseries

=== Cinema ===
Year	Title	Role(s)
2001	The House of Chicken	Alex's boss
2006	The Inquiry	Vulpes
2017	I peggiori	Commissioner
2018	Humanism! - A New Comedy	

=== Documentaries ===
Year	Title
2014	It's Better in Italian
2020	All'ombra del microfono

=== Music videos ===
Year	Title	Artist
2016	La Fenice	Paul Bryan feat. Roberto Pedicini
2018	Faccio quello che voglio	Fabio Rovazzi

== Voice work ==
Year	Title	Role	Notes
1992	Gesù, un mondo senza confini	Gesù (Jesus)	Animated film
1996	How the Toys Saved Christmas	Scarpa	Animated film
2006	Olè	Narrator	Comedy
2006	Really SSSupercool: Chapter Two	Narrator	Comedy
2006	La tomba	Narrator	Horror film
2009	Pathos	Voice-over	Short film
2015	S Is for Stanley	Stanley Kubrick	Documentary
2015	21 gradi	Voice-over	Web-series
2019	The Beth Avalanche - In the footsteps of Pietro Giani	Voice-over	Docu-film
2019	Adrian	High commissioner	Animated series
2020	Essere Colapesce	Voice-over	Short film
2020	Le reti fantasma	Voice of the Sea	Documentary short
2023	Safara	Voice-over	Documentary
2024	Rotta 230 - Ritorno alla Terra dei Padri	Voice-over	Documentary
2024	Rino Della Negra, calciatore partigiano	Voice-over	Docu-film

=== Dubbing ===
==== Films (Animation, Italian dub) ====
Year	Title	Role(s)	Ref
1991	Beauty and the Beast	Gaston	
1996	The Hunchback of Notre Dame	Phoebus	
1996	Space Jam	Sylvester, Taz	
1997	Armitage III: Poly-Matrix	Renè d'Anclaude	
1997	The Swan Princess: Escape from Castle Mountain	Sir Clavius	
1998	A Bug's Life	Hopper	
1998	The Prince of Egypt	Moses, God	
1998	The Lion King II: Simba's Pride	Timon	
1998	Kirikou and the Sorceress	Adult Kirikou	
1999	Madeline: Lost in Paris	Uncle Horst	
1999	Madeline: Lost in Paris	Henri	
1999	Mickey's Once Upon a Christmas	Goofy	
2000	An Extremely Goofy Movie	Goofy	
2000	The Adventures of Rocky and Bullwinkle	Bullwinkle J. Moose	
2000	Titan A.E.	Captain Joseph Korso	
2000	Tweety's High-Flying Adventure	Sylvester	
2001	Final Fantasy: The Spirits Within	Captain Gray Edwards	
2001	Mickey's Magical Christmas: Snowed in at the House of Mouse	Goofy	
2002	The Hunchback of Notre Dame II	Phoebus	
2002	Mickey's House of Villains	Goofy	
2003	Looney Tunes: Back in Action	Sylvester	
2003	Looney Tunes: Back in Action	Taz	
2004	Mickey, Donald, Goofy: The Three Musketeers	Goofy	
2004	Team America: World Police	Kim Jong Il	
2004	The Wonderful World of Puss 'n Boots	Lucifer (2004 redub)	
2004	The Adventures of Ichabod and Mr. Toad	District Attorney (2004 redub)	
2004	Mickey's Twice Upon a Christmas	Goofy	
2005	Wallace & Gromit: The Curse of the Were-Rabbit	Lord Victor Quartermaine	
2006	The Ugly Duckling and Me!	Ratso	
2006	The Wild	Blag	
2006	Shark Bait	Nelson	
2006	Happy Feet	Memphis	
2006	Bah, Humduck! A Looney Tunes Christmas	Sylvester	
2007	Meet the Robinsons	Bowler Hat Guy	
2007	Meet the Robinsons	Mike "Goob" Yagoobian	
2008	Madagascar: Escape 2 Africa	Moto Moto	
2009	A Christmas Carol	Ebenezer Scrooge	
2010	Megamind	Megamind	
2012	The Pirates! In an Adventure with Scientists!	Black Bellamy	
2013	Free Birds	Jake	
2016	Moana	Tui	
2017	The Lego Batman Movie	Alfred Pennyworth	
2017	Deep	Darcy	
2019	The Lego Movie 2: The Second Part	Alfred Pennyworth	
2021	Space Jam: A New Legacy	Sylvester	
2021	Space Jam: A New Legacy	Taz	
2022	Puss in Boots: The Last Wish	Papa Bear	
2023	Once Upon a Studio	Goofy	
2023	Once Upon a Studio	Timon	
2024	Moana 2	Tui	

==== Films (Live action, Italian dub) ====
Year	Title	Role(s)	Original actor	Ref
1983	Rumble Fish	The Motorcycle Boy	Mickey Rourke	
1983	Eureka	Aurelio D'Amato	Mickey Rourke	
1983	Star 80	Paul Snider	Eric Roberts	
1984	Amadeus	Wolfgang Amadeus Mozart	Tom Hulce	
1984	Deadly Impact	Al	Giovanni Lombardo Radice	
1985	Demons	George	Urbano Barberini	
1986	Aliens	Carter J. Burke	Paul Reiser	
1986	Short Circuit	Newton Crosby	Steve Guttenberg	
1986	The Mission	Felipe Mendoza	Aidan Quinn	
1986	Echo Park	Jonathan	Tom Hulce	
1987	Good Morning, Babylon	Nicola Bonanno	Vincent Spano	
1987	The Princess Bride	Westley	Cary Elwes	
1987	Wall Street	Marvin	John C. McGinley	
1987	Dirty Dancing	Johnny Castle	Patrick Swayze	
1987	Prick Up Your Ears	Joe Orton	Gary Oldman	
1987	The Fourth Protocol	Valeri Petrofsky, James Ross	Pierce Brosnan	
1987	D'Annunzio	Gabriele D'Annunzio	Robert Powell	
1987	The Principal	Principal Rick Latimer	Jim Belushi	
1987	Beauty and the Beast	Beast / Prince	John Savage	
1988	Big	Paul Davenport	John Heard	
1988	Die Hard	John McClane	Bruce Willis	
1988	Dominick and Eugene	Dominick "Nicky" Luciano	Tom Hulce	
1988	Off Limits	Buck McGriff	Willem Dafoe	
1988	Young Guns	Richard M. Brewer	Charlie Sheen	
1988	The Mask	Leonardo	Michael Maloney	
1989	Dead Calm	Hughie Warriner	Billy Zane	
1989	Best of the Best	Alex Grady	Eric Roberts	
1989	Blood Red	Marco Collogero	Eric Roberts	
1989	Pet Sematary	Louis Creed	Dale Midkiff	
1989	Winter People	Wayland Jackson	Kurt Russell	
1989	Wait Until Spring, Bandini	Svevo Bandini	Joe Mantegna	
1990	Darkman	Louis Strack Jr.	Colin Friels	
1990	Memphis Belle	Val Kozlowski	Billy Zane	
1990	The Dark Sun	Ruggero Brickman	Michael Paré	
1990	The Palermo Connection	Ted	Vyto Ruginis	
1990	Chicago Joe and the Showgirl	Karl Hulten	Kiefer Sutherland	
1991	Fried Green Tomatoes	Frank Bennett	Nick Searcy	
1991	New Jack City	Nino Brown	Wesley Snipes	
1991	Ricochet	Nick Styles	Denzel Washington	
1991	Curly Sue	Bill Dancer	Jim Belushi	
1991	One Good Cop	Detective Artie Lewis	Michael Keaton	
1991	Homicide	Bobby Gold	Joe Mantegna	
1991	Door to Silence	Melvin Dovereux	John Savage	
1991	Naked Tango	Zico Borenstein	Esai Morales	
1991	Oscar	Anthony Rossano	Vincent Spano	
1992	1492: Conquest of Paradise	Christopher Columbus	Gérard Depardieu	
1992	Glengarry Glen Ross	John Williamson	Kevin Spacey	
1992	Basic Instinct	Dr. Lamott	Stephen Tobolowsky	
1992	Wind	Joe Heiser	Stellan Skarsgård	
1992	Orlando	Shelmerdine	Billy Zane	
1992	One False Move	Ray Malcolm	Billy Bob Thornton	
1992	Straight Talk	Steve	Michael Madsen	
1992	Passenger 57	John Cutter	Wesley Snipes	
1992	CIA Code Name: Alexa	Mark Graver	Lorenzo Lamas	
1992	Timescape	Ben Wilson	Jeff Daniels	
1992	Body Puzzle	Michael	Tomas Arana	
1992	The Mambo Kings	Nestor Castillo	Antonio Banderas	
1993	Schindler's List	Amon Göth	Ralph Fiennes	
1993	Sliver	Zeke Hawkins	William Baldwin	
1993	True Romance	Lee Donowitz	Saul Rubinek	
1993	Free Willy	Glen Greenwood	Michael Madsen	
1993	CIA II: Target Alexa	Mark Graver	Lorenzo Lamas	
1993	Much Ado About Nothing	Don Pedro	Denzel Washington	
1993	Body Bags	Brent Matthews	Mark Hamill	
1993	Kalifornia	Early Grayce	Brad Pitt	
1993	Romeo Is Bleeding	Jack Grimaldi	Gary Oldman	
1994	Natural Born Killers	Mickey Knox	Woody Harrelson	
1994	Cemetery Man	Francesco Dellamorte	Rupert Everett	
1994	Once Were Warriors	Jake "The Muss" Heke	Temuera Morrison	
1994	The Adventures of Priscilla, Queen of the Desert	Adam Whitely, Felicia Jollygoodfellow	Guy Pearce	
1994	Quiz Show	Charles Van Doren	Ralph Fiennes	
1994	The Madness of King George	George, Prince of Wales	Rupert Everett	
1994	Ladybird, Ladybird	Simon	Ray Winstone	
1994	Nell	Sheriff Todd Peterson	Nick Searcy	
1994	Richie Rich	Professor Keenbean	Mike McShane	
1994	The Childhood Friend	Arnold Gardner	Jason Robards III	
1994	The Jungle Book	Captain William Boone	Cary Elwes	
1994	Of Love and Shadows	Francisco	Antonio Banderas	
1994	Rapa-Nui	Make	Esai Morales	
1994	Blown Away	Anthony Franklin	Forest Whitaker	
1995	Batman Forever	Edward Nygma / The Riddler	Jim Carrey	
1995	Braveheart	Hamish Campbell	Brendan Gleeson	
1995	Clockers	Victor Dunham	Isaiah Washington	
1995	The Usual Suspects	Roger "Verbal" Kint	Kevin Spacey	
1995	La Haine	Vinz	Vincent Cassel	
1995	Othello	Roderigo	Michael Maloney	
1995	Species	Dan Smithson	Forest Whitaker	
1995	Free Willy 2: The Adventure Home	Glen Greenwood	Michael Madsen	
1995	Sudden Death	Darren McCord	Jean-Claude Van Damme	
1995	Empire Records	Joe Reaves	Anthony LaPaglia	
1995	12 Monkeys	Dr. Peters	David Morse	
1995	Stonewall	Bostonia	Duane Boutte	
1995	Guardian Angels	Antoine Carco	Gérard Depardieu	
1996	Bambola	Furio	Jorge Perugorría	
1996	The Cable Guy	Ernie "Chip" Douglas	Jim Carrey	
1996	Looking for Richard	Buckingham	Kevin Spacey	
1996	Sleepers	Sean Nokes	Kevin Bacon	
1996	Space Jam	Larry Johnson	Larry Johnson	
1996	The Sunchaser	Michael Reynolds	Woody Harrelson	
1996	Kingpin	Roy Munson	Woody Harrelson	
1996	The Ghost and the Darkness	John Henry Patterson	Val Kilmer	
1996	Big Night	Secondo	Stanley Tucci	
1996	Feeling Minnesota	Detective Ben Costikyan	Dan Aykroyd	
1996	Come mi vuoi	Pasquale	Vincent Cassel	
1996	Head Above Water	Kent Draper	Billy Zane	
1996	The Elective Affinities	Edoardo	Jean-Hugues Anglade	
1996	Jingle All the Way	Myron Larabee	Sinbad	
1996	Freeway	Robert "Bob" Wolverton	Kiefer Sutherland	
1996	Exit in Red	Ed Altman	Mickey Rourke	
1996	Guy	Guy	Vincent D'Onofrio	
1997	Alien Resurrection	Jonathan Gediman	Brad Dourif	
1997	Live Flesh	David	Javier Bardem	
1997	The Saint	Simon Templar	Val Kilmer	
1997	Murder at 1600	Detective Harlan Regis	Wesley Snipes	
1997	Liar Liar	Fletcher Reede	Jim Carrey	
1997	Wag the Dog	Sergeant William Schumann	Woody Harrelson	
1997	Doing Time for Patsy Cline	Boyd	Richard Roxburgh	
1997	Dobermann	Yann Lepentrec / Dobermann	Vincent Cassel	
1997	Contact	Palmer Joss	Matthew McConaughey	
1997	The Locusts	Clay Hewitt	Vince Vaughn	
1997	Breakdown	Jeff Taylor	Kurt Russell	
1997	Marquise	Molière	Bernard Giraudeau	
1997	Marianna Ucrìa	Grass	Bernard Giraudeau	
1997	The Truce	Primo Levi	John Turturro	
1997	Mean Guns	Lou	Christopher Lambert	
1997	Nirvana	Jimi Dini	Christopher Lambert	
1997	Hoodlum	Lucky Luciano	Andy García	
1997	George of the Jungle	Narrator	Keith Scott	
1998	Blues Brothers 2000	Cabel Chamberlain	Joe Morton	
1998	Celebrity	Lee Simon	Kenneth Branagh	
1998	The Theory of Flight	Richard	Kenneth Branagh	
1998	The Mask of Zorro	Harrison Love	Matt Letscher	
1998	The Thin Red Line	Sergeant William Keck	Woody Harrelson	
1998	Great Expectations	Joe Coleman	Chris Cooper	
1998	Saving Private Ryan	Mike Horvath	Tom Sizemore	
1998	The Truman Show	Truman Burbank	Jim Carrey	
1998	Letters from a Killer	Race Darnell	Patrick Swayze	
1998	The Avengers	John Steed	Ralph Fiennes	
1998	He Got Game	Jake Shuttlesworth	Denzel Washington	
1998	New Rose Hotel	X	Willem Dafoe	
1998	The Lost Son	Lombard	Daniel Auteuil	
1998	Sometimes They Come Back... for More	Sam Cage	Clayton Rohner	
1999	American Beauty	Lester Burnham	Kevin Spacey	
1999	The Big Kahuna	Larry Mann	Kevin Spacey	
1999	Man on the Moon	Andy Kaufman, Tony Clifton	Jim Carrey	
1999	What Becomes of the Broken Hearted?	Jake "The Muss" Heke	Temuera Morrison	
1999	Play It to the Bone	Vince Boudreau	Woody Harrelson	
1999	Unruly	Pitou	Vincent Cassel	
1999	An Ideal Husband	Lord Arthur Goring	Rupert Everett	
1999	Breakfast of Champions	Dwayne Hoover	Bruce Willis	
1999	At First Sight	Virgil Adamson	Val Kilmer	
1999	The Mod Squad	Billy Waites	Josh Brolin	
1999	From Dusk Till Dawn 2: Texas Blood Money	Jesus Draven	Raymond Cruz	
1999	The Thirteenth Floor	Jerry Ashton, Jason Whitney	Vincent D'Onofrio	
2000	U-571	Lieutenant Michael Hirsch	Jake Weber	
2000	Before Night Falls	Reinaldo Arenas	Javier Bardem	
2000	Pay It Forward	Eugene Simonet	Kevin Spacey	
2000	The Monkey's Mask	Nick Maitland	Marton Csokas	
2000	Gangster No. 1	Young Gangster	Paul Bettany	
2000	The Little Vampire	Frederick Sackville-Bagg	Richard E. Grant	
2000	Shanghai Noon	Chon Wang	Jackie Chan	
2000	Nurse Betty	Del Sizemore	Aaron Eckhart	
2000	State and Main	Doug Mackenzie	Clark Gregg	
2000	Hellraiser: Inferno	Pinhead	Doug Bradley	
2001	Final Fantasy: The Spirits Within	Captain Gray Edwards	Alec Baldwin	
2001	A Knight's Tale	Geoffrey Chaucer	Paul Bettany	
2001	K-PAX	Prot, Robert Porter	Kevin Spacey	
2001	The Shipping News	Quoyle	Kevin Spacey	
2001	Sweet November	Chaz Watley	Jason Isaacs	
2001	Donnie Darko	Jim Cunningham	Patrick Swayze	
2001	Thomas	Longinus	Mathias Herrmann	
2001	The Majestic	Peter Appleton	Jim Carrey	
2001	Brotherhood of the Wolf	Jean-François de Morangias	Vincent Cassel	
2001	Harry Potter and the Philosopher's Stone	Firenze	Ray Fearon	
2002	The Importance of Being Earnest	Algernon "Algy" Moncrieff	Rupert Everett	
2002	Red Dragon	Francis Dolarhyde	Ralph Fiennes	
2002	Maid in Manhattan	Christopher Marshall	Ralph Fiennes	
2002	The Count of Monte Cristo	Luigi Vampa	JB Blanc	
2002	Mondays in the Sun	Santa	Javier Bardem	
2002	Star Wars: Episode II – Attack of the Clones	Jango Fett, Clone Troopers	Temuera Morrison	
2002	Austin Powers in Goldmember	Austin Powers, Dr. Evil, Fat Bastard, Goldmember	Mike Myers	
2002	The Soul Keeper	Carl Gustav Jung	Iain Glen	
2002	Windtalkers	Major Mellitz	Jason Isaacs	
2002	The Tuxedo	Clark Devlin	Jason Isaacs	
2002	Killing Me Softly	Adam Tallis	Joseph Fiennes	
2002	E.T. the Extra-Terrestrial (2002 redub)	Keys	Peter Coyote	
2002	Igby Goes Down	D. H. Banes	Jeff Goldblum	
2002	Rabid Dogs (2002 alternate edit)	Police Inspector	Stefano De Sando	
2003	The Life of David Gale	David Gale	Kevin Spacey	
2003	The United States of Leland	Albert T. Fitzgerald	Kevin Spacey	
2003	Shanghai Knights	Chon Wang	Jackie Chan	
2003	The Rundown	Beck	Dwayne Johnson	
2003	The Recruit	Dennis Slayne	Karl Pruner	
2003	Luther	Pope Leo X	Uwe Ochsenknecht	
2003	A Touch of Spice	Fanis Iakovidis	Georges Corraface	
2003	X2	Kurt Wagner / Nightcrawler	Alan Cumming	
2003	Bulletproof Monk	Monk with No Name	Chow Yun-fat	
2003	Anger Management	Chuck	John Turturro	
2003	George of the Jungle 2	Narrator	Keith Scott	
2003	Coffee and Cigarettes	Bill Murray	Bill Murray	
2003	The Hunted	Dale Hewitt	Mark Pellegrino	
2003	The Missing	Jim Ducharme	Val Kilmer	
2003	One Last Dance	Travis MacPhearson	Patrick Swayze	
2003	Take My Eyes	Antonio	Luis Tosar	
2004	50 First Dates	Nick	Pomaika'i Brown	
2004	After the Sunset	Stan Lloyd	Woody Harrelson	
2004	She Hate Me	Leland Powell	Woody Harrelson	
2004	Catwoman	George Hedare	Lambert Wilson	
2004	Downfall	Joseph Goebbels	Ulrich Matthes	
2004	Evilenko	Vadim Timurovich Lesiev	Marton Csokas	
2004	Lemony Snicket's A Series of Unfortunate Events	Count Olaf	Jim Carrey	
2004	Eternal Sunshine of the Spotless Mind	Joel Barish	Jim Carrey	
2004	Mindhunters	Jake Harris	Val Kilmer	
2004	Spider-Man 2	Dr. Curt Connors	Dylan Baker	
2004	Van Helsing	Count Vladislaus Dracula	Richard Roxburgh	
2004	The Sea Inside	Ramón Sampedro	Javier Bardem	
2004	Stage Beauty	King Charles II	Rupert Everett	
2004	A Different Loyalty	Leo Cauffield	Rupert Everett	
2004	Around the World in 80 Days	Passepartout, Lau Xing, Tiger	Jackie Chan	
2004	Anchorman: The Legend of Ron Burgundy	Arturo Mendez	Ben Stiller	
2004	Crash	Cameron Thayer	Terrence Howard	
2004	Eyes of Crystal	Professor Avildsen	Carmelo Gómez	
2004	Mr. 3000	Stan Ross	Bernie Mac	
2004	Ella Enchanted	Sir Edgar	Cary Elwes	
2005	Batman Begins	Arnold Flass	Mark Boone Junior	
2005	King Kong	Captain Englehorn	Thomas Kretschmann	
2005	Keeping Mum	Lance	Patrick Swayze	
2005	Must Love Dogs	Bob Connor	Dermot Mulroney	
2005	Edison	Levon Wallace	Kevin Spacey	
2005	Fun with Dick and Jane	Dick Harper	Jim Carrey	
2005	The Big White	Raymond Barnell	Woody Harrelson	
2005	Separate Lies	William "Bill" Bule	Rupert Everett	
2005	Star Wars: Episode III – Revenge of the Sith	Commander Cody, Clone Troopers	Temuera Morrison	
2005	Æon Flux	Trevor Goodchild	Marton Csokas	
2005	The Great Raid	Captain Redding	Marton Csokas	
2005	Asylum	Edgar Stark	Marton Csokas	
2005	Hide and Seek	Sheriff Hafferty	Dylan Baker	
2005	Stealth	Captain Dick Marshfield	Joe Morton	
2005	Sahara	Yves Massarde	Lambert Wilson	
2005	The Constant Gardener	Justin Quayle	Ralph Fiennes	
2005	Stories of Lost Souls	Y	Paul Bettany	
2006	A Scanner Darkly	James Barris	Robert Downey Jr.	
2006	The Da Vinci Code	Silas	Paul Bettany	
2006	Goya's Ghosts	Lorenzo Casamares	Javier Bardem	
2006	Superman Returns	Lex Luthor	Kevin Spacey	
2006	Night at the Museum	Dr. McPhee	Ricky Gervais	
2006	The Departed	Captain George Ellerby	Alec Baldwin	
2006	A Prairie Home Companion	Dusty	Woody Harrelson	
2006	The White Countess	Todd Jackson	Ralph Fiennes	
2006	Gridiron Gang	Coach Sean Porter	Dwayne Johnson	
2006	Game 6	Nicky Rogan	Michael Keaton	
2006	School for Scoundrels	Dr. P, Dennis Sherman	Billy Bob Thornton	
2006	Unknown	Snakeskin Boots, Stefan Burian	Peter Stormare	
2006	The Illusionist	Chief Inspector Walter Uhl	Paul Giamatti	
2006	Curse of the Golden Flower	Emperor Ping	Chow Yun-fat	
2006	Bernard and Doris	Bernard Lafferty	Ralph Fiennes	
2006	Stranger than Fiction	Dr. Cayly	Tom Hulce	
2006	My Best Friend	François Coste	Daniel Auteuil	
2007	American Gangster	Detective Trupo	Josh Brolin	
2007	Love in the Time of Cholera	Florentino Ariza	Javier Bardem	
2007	No Country for Old Men	Anton Chigurh	Javier Bardem	
2007	Beowulf	Unferth	John Malkovich	
2007	The Walker	Carter Page III	Woody Harrelson	
2007	Mother of Tears	Michael Pierce	Adam James	
2007	Pirates of the Caribbean: At World's End	Sao Feng	Chow Yun-fat	
2007	Spider-Man 3	Dr. Curt Connors	Dylan Baker	
2007	Stardust	Prince Septimus	Mark Strong	
2007	Transformers	Ironhide	Jess Harnell	
2007	Fred Claus	Clyde Archibald Northcutt	Kevin Spacey	
2007	The Number 23	Walter Sparrow, Detective Fingerling	Jim Carrey	
2007	St Trinian's	Camilla Fritton, Carnaby Fritton	Rupert Everett	
2007	Towelhead	Travis Vuoso	Aaron Eckhart	
2007	300	Leonidas	Gerard Butler	
2007	Code Name: The Cleaner	Jake Rogers	Cedric the Entertainer	
2007	Anamorph	Blair Collet	Peter Stormare	
2007	The Godfather (2007 redub)	Sonny Corleone	James Caan	
2007	The Godfather Part II (2007 redub)	Sonny Corleone	James Caan	
2008	21	Micky Rosa	Kevin Spacey	
2008	Get Smart	Agent 23	Dwayne Johnson	
2008	Frost/Nixon	Jack Brennan	Kevin Bacon	
2008	Rambo	Michael Burnett	Paul Schulze	
2008	Valkyrie	Henning von Tresckow	Kenneth Branagh	
2008	Seven Pounds	Ezra Turner	Woody Harrelson	
2008	Vicky Cristina Barcelona	Juan Antonio Gonzalo	Javier Bardem	
2008	Daddy Cool	Philippe Le Tallec	Daniel Auteuil	
2008	Yes Man	Carl Allen	Jim Carrey	
2008	Ghost Town	Bertram Pincus	Ricky Gervais	
2008	The Love Guru	Guru Maurice Pitka	Mike Myers	
2008	The Love Guru	Val Kilmer	Val Kilmer	
2008	In Bruges	Harry Waters	Ralph Fiennes	
2008	The Accidental Husband	Patrick Sullivan	Jeffrey Dean Morgan	
2008	Mamma Mia!	Harry Bright	Colin Firth	
2008	I’ll Live Alone Again	Nico	Don Johnson	
2009	Inglourious Basterds	General Ed Fenech	Mike Myers	
2009	Pope Joan	Johanna's father	Iain Glen	
2009	The Case of Unfaithful Klara	Denis	Iain Glen	
2009	Moon	GERTY	Kevin Spacey	
2009	The Men Who Stare at Goats	Larry Hooper	Kevin Spacey	
2009	Transformers: Revenge of the Fallen	Ironhide	Jess Harnell	
2009	Night at the Museum: Battle of the Smithsonian	Dr. McPhee	Ricky Gervais	
2009	I Love You Phillip Morris	Steven Russell	Jim Carrey	
2009	The Messenger	Captain Tony Stone	Woody Harrelson	
2009	The Young Victoria	King Leopold I of Belgium	Thomas Kretschmann	
2009	Old Dogs	Jimmy Lunchbox	Bernie Mac	
2009	Antichrist	He	Willem Dafoe	
2009	Shadow	Bartender, Doctor	Emilio De Marchi	
2010	Dylan Dog: Dead of Night	Vargas	Taye Diggs	
2010	Easy A	Dill Penderghast	Stanley Tucci	
2010	Burlesque	Sean	Stanley Tucci	
2010	Black Swan	Thomas Leroy / The Gentleman	Vincent Cassel	
2010	The Sorcerer's Apprentice	Maxim Horvath	Alfred Molina	
2010	Prince of Persia: The Sands of Time	Sheik Amar	Alfred Molina	
2010	Father of Invention	Robert Axle	Kevin Spacey	
2010	Casino Jack	Jack Abramoff	Kevin Spacey	
2010	Clash of the Titans	Hades	Ralph Fiennes	
2010	Nanny McPhee and the Big Bang	Lord Gray	Ralph Fiennes	
2010	The Tourist	Inspector John Acheson	Paul Bettany	
2010	Of Gods and Men	Christophe	Olivier Rabourdin	
2010	Eat Pray Love	Felipe	Javier Bardem	
2010	Biutiful	Uxbal	Javier Bardem	
2010	Confucius	Confucius	Chow Yun-fat	
2011	Sleep Tight	César	Luis Tosar	
2011	Horrible Bosses	Dave Harken	Kevin Spacey	
2011	Margin Call	Sam Rogers	Kevin Spacey	
2011	Johnny English Reborn	Simon Ambrose	Dominic West	
2011	Transformers: Dark of the Moon	Ironhide	Jess Harnell	
2011	Mr. Popper's Penguins	Tom Popper Jr.	Jim Carrey	
2011	Blood Out	Arturo	Val Kilmer	
2011	Priest	Priest	Paul Bettany	
2011	The Last Fashion Show	Federico Marinoni	Richard E. Grant	
2011	Peace, Love & Misunderstanding	Jude	Jeffrey Dean Morgan	
2012	The Hunger Games	Caesar Flickerman	Stanley Tucci	
2012	Skyfall	Raoul Silva	Javier Bardem	
2012	To the Wonder	Father Quintana	Javier Bardem	
2012	Seven Psychopaths	Charlie Costello	Woody Harrelson	
2012	Great Expectations	Magwitch	Ralph Fiennes	
2012	The Scorpion King 3: Battle for Redemption	King Talus	Billy Zane	
2012	Rock of Ages	Dennis Dupree	Alec Baldwin	
2012	Iron Sky	Klaus Adler	Götz Otto	
2012	The Five-Year Engagement	Tom Solomon	Jason Segel	
2013	The Hunger Games: Catching Fire	Caesar Flickerman	Stanley Tucci	
2013	Kick-Ass 2	Sal Bertolinni / Colonel Stars and Stripes	Jim Carrey	
2013	The Incredible Burt Wonderstone	Steve Gray	Jim Carrey	
2013	Anchorman 2: The Legend Continues	Scott Riles	Jim Carrey	
2013	Man of Steel	Colonel Nathan Hardy	Christopher Meloni	
2013	Now You See Me	Merritt McKinney	Woody Harrelson	
2013	Lovelace	Louis "Butchie" Peraino	Bobby Cannavale	
2014	Horrible Bosses 2	Dave Harken	Kevin Spacey	
2014	Autómata	Blue Robot	Javier Bardem	
2014	The Hunger Games: Mockingjay – Part 1	Caesar Flickerman	Stanley Tucci	
2014	Night at the Museum: Secret of the Tomb	Dr. McPhee	Ricky Gervais	
2014	The Equalizer	Nicolai "Teddy" Itchenko	Marton Csokas	
2014	Serena	Mr. Buchanan	David Dencik	
2014	Dumb and Dumber To	Lloyd Christmas	Jim Carrey	
2014	Beauty and the Beast	Beast / Prince	Vincent Cassel	
2014	Get On Up	Ben Bart	Dan Aykroyd	
2014	Piégé	Murat	Laurent Lucas	
2014	Sin City: A Dame to Kill For	Mort	Christopher Meloni	
2014	The Salvation	Henry Delarue	Jeffrey Dean Morgan	
2015	The Hunger Games: Mockingjay – Part 2	Caesar Flickerman	Stanley Tucci	
2015	The Gunman	Felix Marti	Javier Bardem	
2015	A Bigger Splash	Harry Hawkes	Ralph Fiennes	
2015	My King	Georgio	Vincent Cassel	
2015	Secret in Their Eyes	Martín Morales	Alfred Molina	
2015	Ricki and the Flash	Greg	Rick Springfield	
2016	Triple 9	Jeffrey Allen	Woody Harrelson	
2016	Now You See Me 2	Merritt McKinney / Chase McKinney	Woody Harrelson	
2016	Dark Crimes	Tadek	Jim Carrey	
2016	Elvis & Nixon	Richard Nixon	Kevin Spacey	
2016	Nine Lives	Tom Brand	Kevin Spacey	
2016	The Last Face	Miguel Leon	Javier Bardem	
2016	Hail, Caesar!	Laurence Laurentz	Ralph Fiennes	
2016	It's Only the End of the World	Antoine	Vincent Cassel	
2016	Jason Bourne	The Asset	Vincent Cassel	
2016	Special Correspondents	Ian Finch	Ricky Gervais	
2016	Ghostbusters	Mayor Bradley	Andy García	
2016	Live by Night	Irving Figgis	Chris Cooper	
2017	King Arthur: Legend of the Sword	Jack's Eye	Michael McElhatton	
2017	Pirates of the Caribbean: Dead Men Tell No Tales	Armando Salazar	Javier Bardem	
2017	Mother!	Him	Javier Bardem	
2017	Three Billboards Outside Ebbing, Missouri	Bill Willoughby	Woody Harrelson	
2017	Wilson	Wilson	Woody Harrelson	
2017	Baby Driver	Doc	Kevin Spacey	
2017	My Cousin Rachel	Nick Kendall	Iain Glen	
2017	The Hitman's Bodyguard	Mr. Seifert	Richard E. Grant	
2017	Abracadabra	Carlos	Antonio de la Torre	
2018	Billionaire Boys Club	Ron Levin	Kevin Spacey	
2018	The Apparition	Anton Meyer	Anatole Taubman	
2018	Everybody Knows	Paco	Javier Bardem	
2018	The White Crow	Alexander Pushkin	Ralph Fiennes	
2018	Black Tide	François Visconti	Vincent Cassel	
2018	Trading Paint	Bob Linsky	Michael Madsen	
2018	Mamma Mia! Here We Go Again	Harry Bright	Colin Firth	
2019	Midway	Chester W. Nimitz	Woody Harrelson	
2019	Dora and the Lost City of Gold	Powell	Temuera Morrison	
2020	Sonic the Hedgehog	Dr. Robotnik	Jim Carrey	
2021	Being the Ricardos	Desi Arnaz	Javier Bardem	
2021	Dune	Stilgar	Javier Bardem	
2021	The Good Boss	Julio Blanco	Javier Bardem	
2021	The Dig	Basil Brown	Ralph Fiennes	
2021	Ghostbusters: Afterlife	Ray Stantz	Dan Aykroyd	
2022	Amsterdam	Paul Canterbury	Mike Myers	
2022	The Man Who Drew God	Police Detective	Kevin Spacey	
2022	Sonic the Hedgehog 2	Dr. Robotnik	Jim Carrey	
2022	Lyle, Lyle, Crocodile	Hector P. Valenti	Javier Bardem	
2022	Fantastic Beasts: The Secrets of Dumbledore	Gellert Grindelwald	Mads Mikkelsen	
2022	Heatwave	Scott Crane	Sebastian Roché	
2023	The Little Mermaid	King Triton	Javier Bardem	
2023	The Wonderful Story of Henry Sugar	Roald Dahl / The Policeman	Ralph Fiennes	
2023	The Swan	Roald Dahl	Ralph Fiennes	
2023	The Rat Catcher	Roald Dahl / Rat Man	Ralph Fiennes	
2023	Poison	Roald Dahl	Ralph Fiennes	
2024	Dune: Part Two	Stilgar	Javier Bardem	
2024	Ghostbusters: Frozen Empire	Ray Stantz	Dan Aykroyd	
2024	Land of Bad	Saeed Hashimi	Robert Rabiah	
2024	Sonic the Hedgehog 3	Dr. Robotnik	Jim Carrey	

==== Television (Animation, Italian dub) ====
Year	Title	Role(s)	Notes	Ref
1990	DuckTales	Launchpad McQuack	Last 2 episodes; replacing Carlo Reali	
1990	The Flying House	Jesus	Recurring role	
1991–1992	Darkwing Duck	Launchpad McQuack	Main cast	
1992–1995	Giant Robo: The Day the Earth Stood Still	Komei	Recurring role	
1994–1995	Aladdin	Genie	Main cast	
1994–1995	New Cutie Honey	Spider	Recurring role	
1995	Street Fighter II V	Vega	Main cast	
1995	Armitage III	René D'Anclaude	Recurring role	
1995	Looney Tunes	Sylvester, Taz	Main cast; 1995 redubs	
1995	Merrie Melodies	Sylvester, Taz	Main cast; 1995 redubs	
1995, 2003, 2012	The Simpsons	Stan Taylor, Roy Snyder, Ricky Gervais, City Inspector	4 episodes	
1995–1999	Timon & Pumbaa	Timon	Main cast	
1996–2003	The Sylvester & Tweety Mysteries	Sylvester	Main cast	
1997	Quack Pack	Kent Powers	Recurring role	
1999–2000	Mickey Mouse Works	Goofy	Main cast	
2001	Duckman	Eric Tiberius Duckman	Main cast	
2001–2002	Teacher's Pet	Spot Helperman / Scott Leadready II	Main cast	
2001–2003	House of Mouse	Goofy, Timon, Launchpad McQuack, Genie, Gaston	Main cast	
2005	Hellsing	Alucard	Main cast	
2006–2016	Mickey Mouse Clubhouse	Goofy	Main cast	
2008	Yin Yang Yo!	The Manotaur	2 episodes	
2011–2013	Kung Fu Panda: Legends of Awesomeness	Fung	Recurring role	
2011–2015	The Looney Tunes Show	Sylvester, Taz	Recurring role	
2011	Family Guy	Patrick Swayze, Bruce Willis, Goofy	3 episodes	
2012	Crash Canyon	Colton Steel	Recurring role	
2013–2019	Mickey Mouse	Goofy	Main cast	
2015–2020	New Looney Tunes	Sylvester, Taz	Main cast	
2016–2022	The Lion Guard	Timon	Recurring role	
2017–2021	Mickey Mouse Mixed-Up Adventures	Goofy	Main cast	
2021	How to Stay at Home	Goofy	Main cast	
2021–present	Star Wars: Visions	Boba Fett	1 episode	
2021–2023	Looney Tunes Cartoons	Sylvester, Taz	Main cast; Seasons 1–4	
2021–present	Mickey Mouse Funhouse	Goofy	Main cast	
2021	What If...?	Dum Dum Dugan	1 episode	

==== Television (Live action, Italian dub) ====
Year	Title	Role(s)	Notes	Original actor	Ref
1983–1986	The Dukes of Hazzard	Luke Duke	Main cast; Seasons 5–7	Tom Wopat	
1983–1986	The Dukes of Hazzard	Cletus Hogg	6 episodes	Rick Hurst	
1984–1985	The A-Team	H.M. "Howling Mad" Murdock	Main cast; Seasons 1–2	Dwight Schultz	
1984–1986	Loving	Keith Lane / Jonathan Matalaine	9 episodes	John O'Hurley	
1989	The Firm	Clive "Bex" Bissell	TV film	Gary Oldman	
1990–1991	Twin Peaks	Hank Jennings	13 episodes	Chris Mulkey	
1993	Last Light	Denver Bayliss	TV film	Kiefer Sutherland	
1993	Adrift	Nick Terrio	TV film	Bruce Greenwood	
1997	Lois & Clark: The New Adventures of Superman	Lex Luthor	Guest role; Seasons 3–4	John Shea	
1997–1998	Soul Man	Mike Weber	Main cast	Dan Aykroyd	
1998	A Bright Shining Lie	Frank Drummond	TV film	Robert John Burke	
1998–2001	Dawson's Creek	Mitch Leery	Recurring role; Seasons 1–5	John Wesley Shipp	
1998–2001	Oz	Chris Keller	Recurring role	Christopher Meloni	
1999	Road Rage	Jim Carson	TV film	John Wesley Shipp	
2000	In the Beginning	Potiphar	TV miniseries	Steven Berkoff	
2000	Nuremberg	Robert H. Jackson	TV miniseries	Alec Baldwin	
2000	Les Misérables	Javert	TV miniseries	John Malkovich	
2001–2003	The Office	David Brent	Main cast	Ricky Gervais	
2002	Taken	Owen Crawford	TV miniseries	Joel Gretsch	
2004	Sherlock Holmes and the Case of the Silk Stocking	Sherlock Holmes	TV film	Rupert Everett	
2005	Imperium: Saint Peter	Jesus	TV film	Johannes Brandrup	
2005	Sometimes in April	Augustin Muganza	TV film	Idris Elba	
2005	Charmed	Drake	3 episodes	Billy Zane	
2005–2007	Extras	Andy Millman	Main cast	Ricky Gervais	
2006–2009	Law & Order: Special Victims Unit	Dean Porter	5 episodes	Vincent Spano	
2006–2010	Heroes	Noah Bennet	Main cast	Jack Coleman	
2007–2008	Shark	Wayne Robert Callison	1 episode	Billy Campbell	
2008	Recount	Ron Klain	TV film	Kevin Spacey	
2008–2009	Raising the Bar	Nick Balco	Main cast	Currie Graham	
2008–2011	CSI: Crime Scene Investigation	Nate Haskell	Recurring role	Bill Irwin	
2008–2012	Leverage	Jim Sterling	10 episodes	Mark Sheppard	
2009	Desperate Housewives	Dave Williams	Season 5	Neal McDonough	
2010	The Mentalist	Walter Mashburn	2 episodes	Currie Graham	
2011	CSI: NY	Russ Josephson	2 episodes	David James Elliott	
2012	Awake	Michael Britten	Main cast	Jason Isaacs	
2012–2013	Breaking Bad	Declan	3 episodes	Louis Ferreira	
2012–2015	The Walking Dead	Philip Blake / The Governor	19 episodes	David Morrissey	
2012–2016	Game of Thrones	Roose Bolton	19 episodes	Michael McElhatton	
2013–2014	Boardwalk Empire	Valentin Narcisse	11 episodes	Jeffrey Wright	
2013–2015	Hannibal	Hannibal Lecter	Main cast	Mads Mikkelsen	
2013–2017	House of Cards	Frank Underwood	Main cast; Seasons 1–5	Kevin Spacey	
2014	The Normal Heart	Ben Weeks	TV film	Alfred Molina	
2014	American Horror Story: Freak Show	Vince	3 episodes	Lee Tergesen	
2014–2021	Bosch	Irvin Irving	Main cast	Lance Reddick	
2015	Descendants	Jafar	TV film	Maz Jobrani	
2015–present	Chicago Med	Dr. Samuel Abrams	Recurring role	Brennan Brown	
2015–2016	Gotham	Theo Galavan / Azrael	16 episodes	James Frain	
2015–2016	Heroes Reborn	Noah Bennet	Main cast	Jack Coleman	
2016	Medici	Cossa	1 episode	Steven Waddington	
2017	L'onore e il rispetto	Nicola Maino	8 episodes	Bruno Eyron	
2018	American Horror Story: Apocalypse	Anton LaVey	3 episodes	Carlo Rota	
2018–2020	Kidding	Jeff Piccirillo	Main cast	Jim Carrey	
2020–2023	The Mandalorian	Boba Fett	4 episodes	Temuera Morrison	
2021–2022	The Book of Boba Fett	Boba Fett	Main cast	Temuera Morrison	

==== Video games (Italian dub) ====
Year	Title	Role(s)	Ref
1998	A Bug's Life	Hopper	
2000	Disney's Aladdin in Nasira's Revenge	Genie	
2000	Bugs Bunny & Taz: Time Busters	Taz	
2000	The Lion King: Simba's Mighty Adventure	Timon	
2001	Goofy's Fun House	Goofy	
2002	Disney Golf	Goofy	
2002	Taz: Wanted	Taz	
2003	Looney Tunes: Back in Action	Sylvester, Taz	
2008	Disney Think Fast	Goofy	
2011	Kinect: Disneyland Adventures	Goofy, Genie	
2012	Epic Mickey 2: The Power of Two	Goofy	
2014	Call of Duty: Advanced Warfare	Jonathan Irons	
2018	Assassin's Creed Odyssey	Leonidas	
2023	Disney Illusion Island	Goofy	
2023	Star Wars Jedi: Survivor	Boba Fett	
