= Until Death (1988 film) =

- DVD cover
- Italian: Per sempre
- Genre: Horror
- Screenplay by: Dardano Sacchetti; Lamberto Bava
- Story by: Elisa Briganti; Dardano Sacchetti
- Directed by: Lamberto Bava
- Starring: Gioia Scola; David Brandon: Urbano Barberini; Roberto Pedicini
- Composers: Simon Boswell; Mario Tagliaferri

Production
- Executive producers: Massimo Manasse; Marco Grillo Spina
- Cinematography: Gianlorenzo Battaglia; Gianfranco Transunto
- Editors: Mauro Bonnani; Daniele Alabis
- Running time: 93 minutes
- Production companies: Dania Film; Reteitalia

Original release
- Network: Italia 1
- Release: November 1988

Until Death (Italian: Per sempre) is a 1988 Italian made-for-TV horror film directed by Lamberto Bava.

== Plot ==
Eight years ago, Linda (Gioia Scola) and her lover Carlo (David Brandon) murdered Linda's husband Luca (Roberto Pedicini), while she was pregnant with his son. They hid the corpse and since then they have run a small hotel near a fishing lake. One rainy night, a drifter named Marco (Urbano Barberini) arrives at the hotel with apparent knowledge of Linda's dead husband.

== Production ==
Following the success of Demons, Demons 2 and other foreign horror films in Italy, the company Reiteitalia announced in July 1986 that a series titled Brivido giallo which would be made, featuring five made-for-television films directed by Lamberto Bava. Ultimately, four were made between 1987 and 1988: Graveyard Disturbance, Until Death, The Ogre and Dinner with a Vampire.

Until Death was based on an older script by Dardano Sacchetti. Director Lucio Fulci claimed to have created the original story for the film under title Evil Comes Back, based on the 1934 novel The Postman Always Rings Twice. Fulci claimed that Sacchetti then wrote it up and submitted it to several producers with Fulci's name attached, and then found it sold to Luciano Martino with only Sacchetti's name attached. Fulci decided not to sue Sacchetti but broke off relations with the screenwriter. Sacchetti claimed that he was working on a script about sex and ghosts but couldn't choose which one to focus on; Fulci asked him what he was working on, and then took the film to various producers without it going into production. Sacchetti claimed Fulci went as far as having it translated into English without Sacchetti's knowledge. While working on Brivido giallo, Sacchetti stated that Bava knew about the script and asked if it was still available for the series as they required one more episode.

== Release ==
Until Death was released on home video in Germany in November 1988. It had its television premiere in Italy, being shown on August 15, 1989 on Italia 1. In some markets, the film was promoted as a sequel to the film The Changeling as The Changeling 2.

MYA Communications released the film for the first time ever on region 1 DVD in 2009 with the Until Death title.
