= Brivido Giallo =

- Blu-ray Box Set by Cauldron Films
- Genre: Horror
- Written by: Dardano Sacchetti; Lamberto Bava
- Directed by: Lamberto Bava
- Composers: Simon Boswell; Mario Tagliaferri
- Country of origin: Italy
- Original language: Italian
- No. of seasons: 1
- No. of episodes: 4

Production
- Executive producers: Massimo Manasse; Marco Grillo Spina
- Cinematography: Gianfranco Transunto; Gianlorenzo Battaglia
- Editors: Mauro Bonnani; Daniele Alabis
- Production company: Reteitalia

Original release
- Network: Italia 1
- Release: August 8 – August 29, 1989

Brivido Giallo is an Italian horror cable series that featured four horror full-length films directed by Lamberto Bava. The films included in airing order are Graveyard Disturbance, Until Death, The Ogre, and Dinner with a Vampire. Bava would follow up this horror themed cable series with a thriller series of four films called High Tension.

== Production ==
In the late 1980s Italian film productions began to flounder, so director Lamberto Bava decided to make a jump to television. He struck a deal with executive producers Gianfranco Transunto and Gianlorenzo Battaglia for the company Reitalia to make a cable television series that would consist of five full-length films. The plan was to have each film have a different tone. Reiteitalia announce the Brivido Giallo series in July 1986 as a series of five made-for-television films. Of these films, only four would be made: Graveyard Disturbance, Until Death, The Ogre and Dinner with a Vampire. The films were shot between 1987 and 1988.

== Release ==
Some films in the series were shown prior to their scheduled television release in Italy. These include Graveyard Disturbance being screened at the Sitges Film Festival in Spain in October 1987, Until Death being released on home video in Germany in November 1988, and Dinner with a Vampire being released in Japan on April 22, 1989.

The films were released on Italia 1 on the following dates:

- Graveyard Disturbance on August 8, 1989
- Until Death on August 15, 1989
- The Ogre on August 22, 1989
- Dinner with a Vampire on August 29, 1989

Cauldron Films released all four films on a blu-ray box set titled Brivido Giallo in 2025.
