= Ghost Son =

- Directed by: Lamberto Bava
- Written by: Lamberto Bava
- Produced by: Pino Gargiulo, Enzo Giulioli, Marco Guidone, Terence S. Potter, Jacqueline Quella, Gianni Ricci, Paul Raleigh, Liza Essers, Enrico Coletti, Richard Green
- Starring: Laura Harring; John Hannah; Pete Postlethwaite; Coralina Cataldi-Tassoni
- Cinematography: Davide Bassan
- Music by: Simon Boswell
- Distributed by: Moviemax
- Release date: 2007
- Running time: 96 minutes
- Countries: Italy; Spain; United Kingdom
- Language: English

Ghost Son is a 2007 Italian horror-thriller film, written and directed by Lamberto Bava and produced by Pino Gargiulo.

== Plot ==
Stacey and Mark have recently married and are deeply in love with each other. They live on Mark's farm in South Africa. When Mark dies in a car accident, the widow Stacey misses him and decides to stay with their orphan teenage maid, Thandi, on the farm. Later, her friend and doctor Doc finds that Stacey is pregnant. After a complicated delivery, Stacey notes that her baby in some moments seems to be possessed by the spirit of Mark, trying to kill her to bring her to spend eternity with him.

== Cast ==
- Laura Harring as Stacey
- John Hannah as Mark
- Pete Postlethwaite as Doc
- Coralina Cataldi-Tassoni as Beth
- Mosa Kaiser as Thandi
- Susanna Laura Ruedenberg as pediatrician
- Jake David Matthewson as Martin
- Mary Twala as Leleti
- Vanessa Cooke as gynecologist
- Jeremiah Ndlovu as Bongani

== Reception ==
The film received poor response in Italy, with negative reviews in the Corriere della Sera and Il Messaggero.
