= Dinner with a Vampire =

Italian 1989 horror film by Lamberto Bava

- DVD cover
- Italian: A cena col vampiro
- Genre: Horror
- Screenplay by: Dardano Sacchetti; Lamberto Bava
- Story by: Luciano Martino
- Directed by: Lamberto Bava
- Starring: George Hilton; Patrizia Pellegrino; Riccardo Rossi
- Composers: Simon Boswell; Mario Tagliaferri
- Country of origin: Italy
- Original language: Italian

Production
- Executive producers: Massimo Manasse; Marco Grillo Spina
- Cinematography: Gianlorenzo Battaglia; Gianfranco Transunto
- Editors: Mauro Bonnani; Daniele Alabis
- Running time: 92 minutes
- Production companies: Dania Film; Reteitalia

Original release
- Network: Italia 1
- Release: August 29, 1989

Dinner with a Vampire (Italian: A cena col vampiro) is a 1989 Italian television horror film directed by Lamberto Bava and written by Dardano Sacchetti. It was among four films made for the Italian television series Brivido Giallo.

== Plot ==
Four actors win an audition to be in a horror movie and travel to the director's castle for a meeting and to spend the night. Unbeknown to them, the director is actually a vampire. The vampire challenges his guests to kill him. Killing this vampire, however, is achieved only in a unique way.

== Cast ==
- George Hilton as Jurek
- Riccardo Rossi as Gianni
- Patrizia Pellegrino as Rita
- Yvonne Sciò as Monica
- Valeria Milillo as Sasha
- Isabel Russinova as Veronica, Jurek's half vampire companion
- Daniele Aldrovandi as Gilles
- Igor Zalewsky as Ale
- Letizia Ziaco as Nadia
- Stefano Sabelli as Matteo
- Roberto Pedicini as a director

== Production ==
Following the success of the film Demons and Demons 2 and other foreign horror films in Italy, the company Reiteitalia would announce in July 1986 that a series titled Brivido giallo which would be made featuring five made-for-television films directed by Lamberto Bava. Only four would be completed and released. These included Graveyard Disturbance, Until Death, The Ogre and Dinner with a Vampire. The films were shot between 1987 and 1988. Dinner with a Vampire was shot at Castle Sammezzano near Florence, Italy.

Italian film historian Roberto Curti described Dinner with a Vampire as being more openly a parody film compared to Bava's other films made for the series.

== Release ==
Prior to its television premiere in Italy, Dinner with a Vampire was released in Japan by Humax on April 22, 1989. It aired on Italian television channel Italia 1 on August 29, 1989.
