= Sammezzano =

Palace in Tuscany, Italy

- Castello di Sammezzano
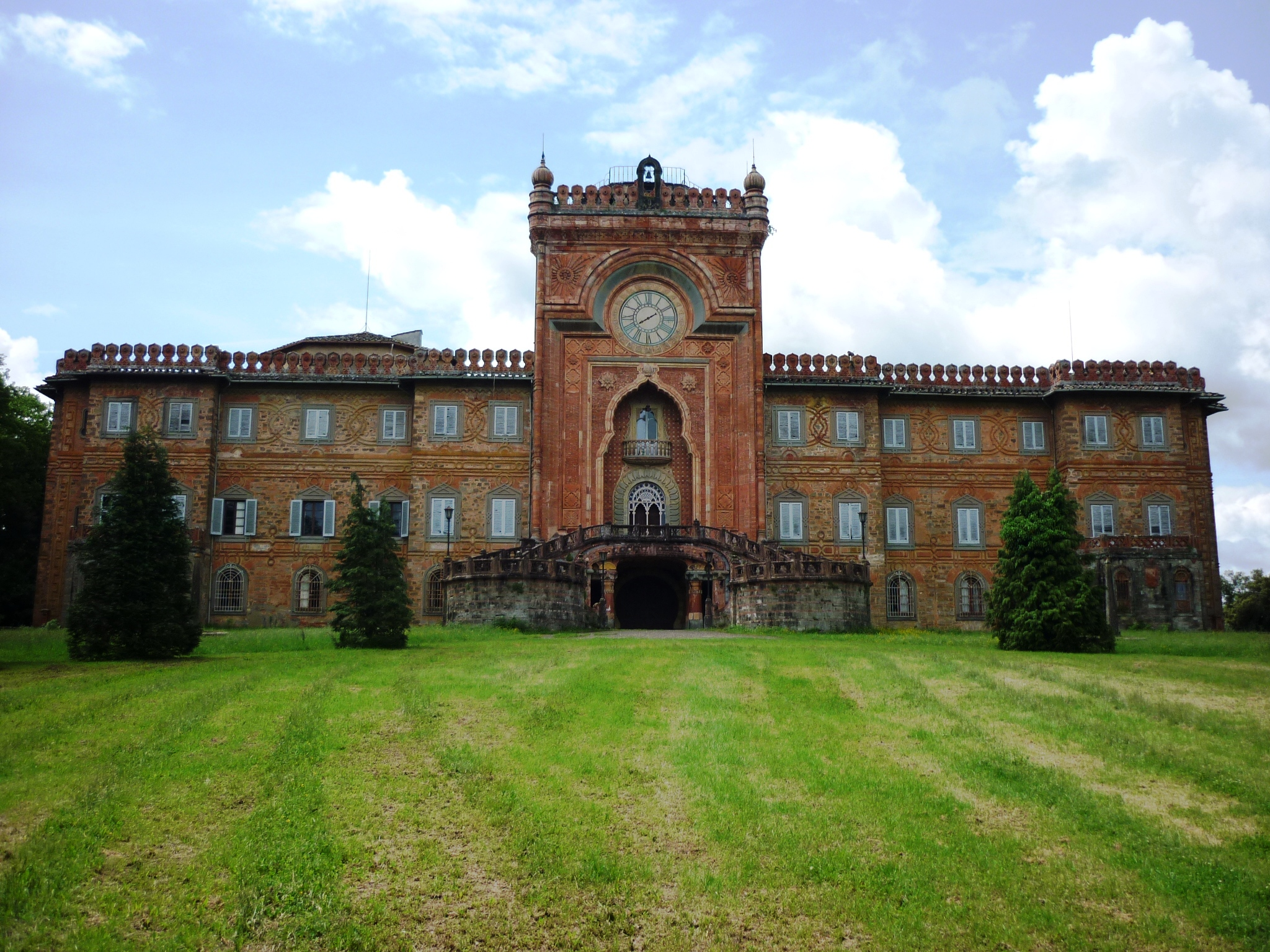
- Exterior of Sammezzano Castle

- Location within Tuscany

General information
- Location: Reggello, Italy, Locality Sammezzano, 50066 Leccio
- Coordinates: 43.703023°N 11.471757°E
- Construction started: 1605
- Completed: 1885

Sammezzano, or the Castle of Sammezzano, is an Italian palazzo in Tuscany featuring Moorish Revival architectural style. It is located in Leccio, a hamlet of Reggello, in the Province of Florence.

== Description ==
The original palazzo was erected in about 1605 by the Spanish nobleman Ximenes of Aragon. In the 19th century, Ferdinando Panciatichi Ximenes d'Aragona inherited the property and remodelled it into one of the largest examples of Moorish Revival architecture between 1853 and 1889. Umberto I, king of Italy, visited Ximenes at Sammezzano in 1878.

The palazzo served as a luxury hotel in the post World War II era; then was vacated and closed. A committee called FPXA 1813–2013, an abbreviation for Ferdinand Panciatichi Ximenes d’Aragon, was organized in 2012 to attempt to restore and preserve the palazzo, which has 365 rooms, each with unique Moorish revival decoration.

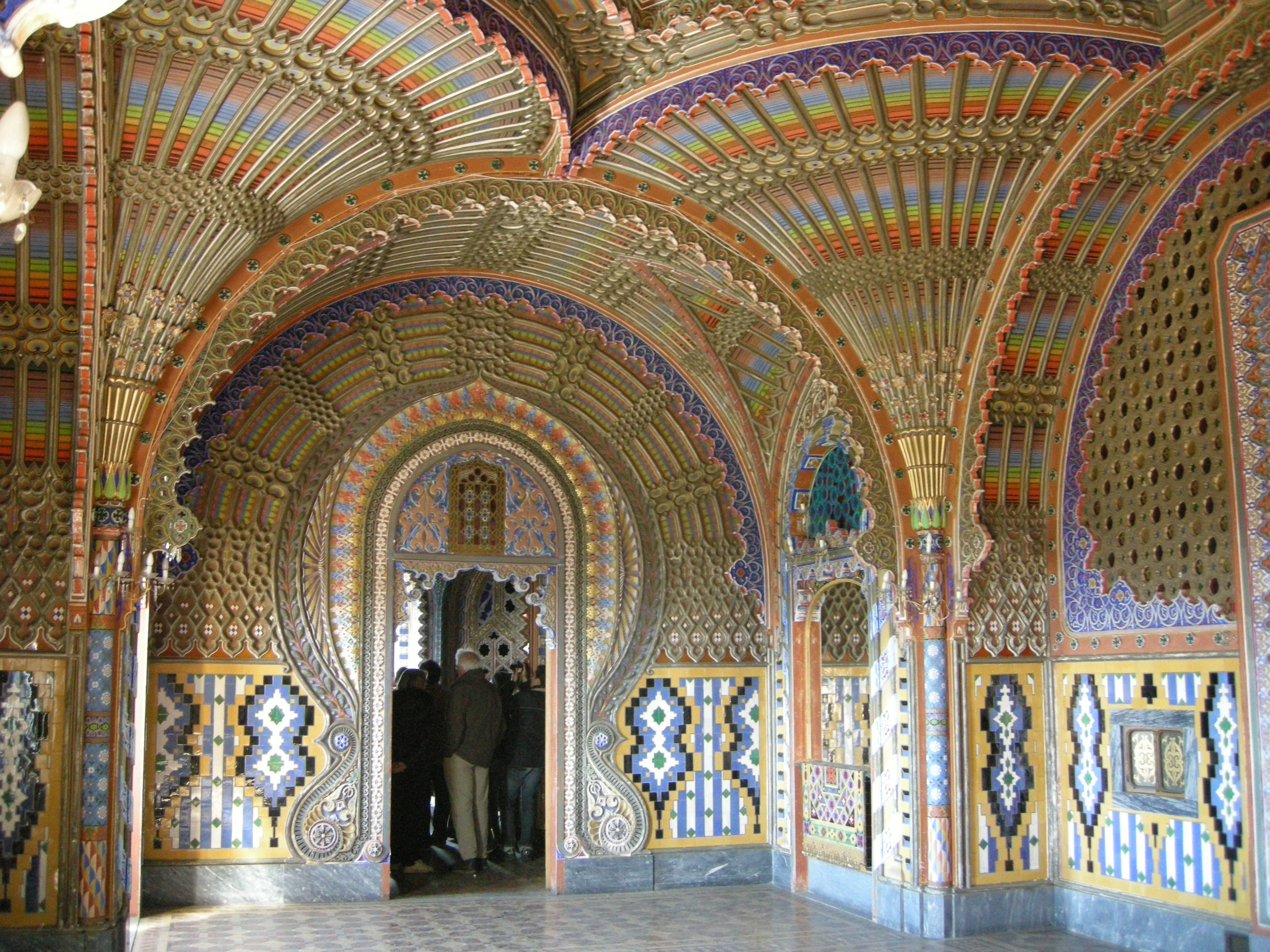
The Peacock Room

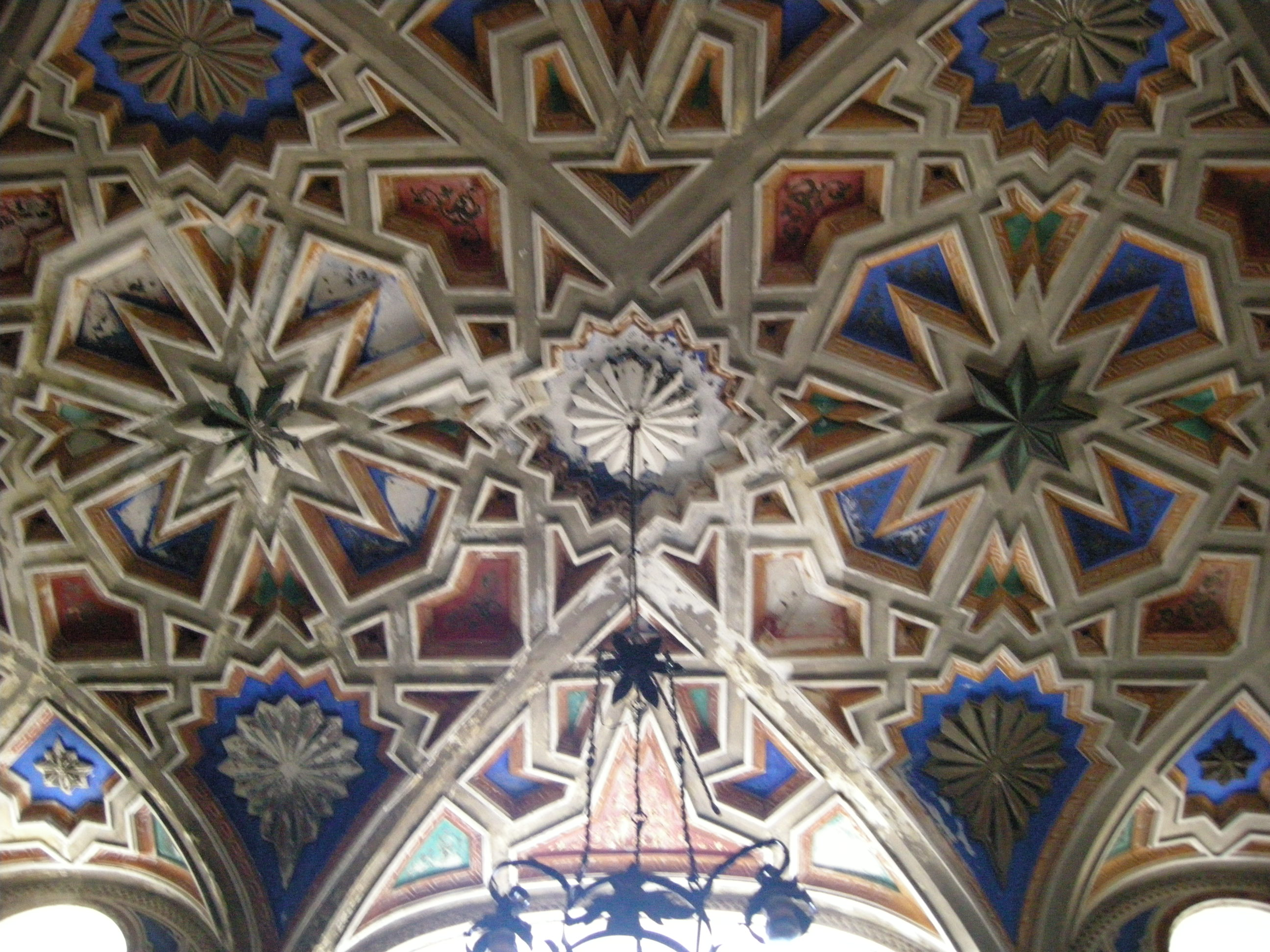
Ceiling detail

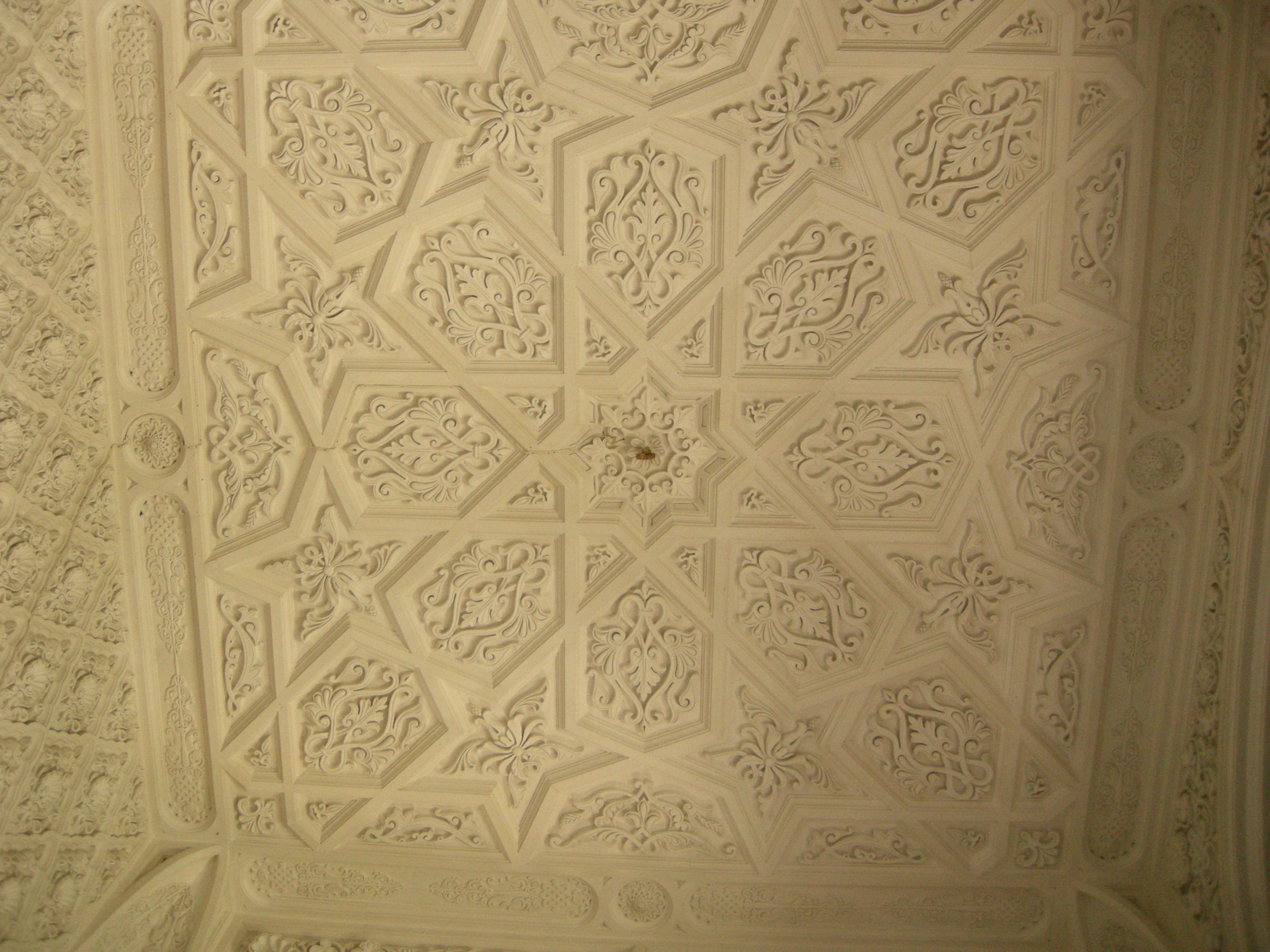
Decorative detail

== In music ==
The Castle of Sammezzano can be seen in the 38 minute long video Beyond the Shores (on Death and Dying) by the band Shores of Null.

== In popular culture ==
The castle was used as a filming location for the 1989 television horror film Dinner with a Vampire (Italian: A cena col vampiro) as well as the 2025 Sandokan series, where it was used to represent the residence of the Sultan of Brunei.
