= I-taliani =

- Genre: Comedy
- Created by: Trettré
- Starring: Trettré
- Country of origin: Italy
- No. of seasons: 2

Production
- Camera setup: 3:4
- Running time: 25 min.

Original release
- Network: Italia 1
- Release: 1989 – 1990

I-taliani is an Italian television series, performed by the comedy trio Trettré (Gino Cogliandro, Mirko Setaro and Eduardo Romano), and broadcast on Italia 1.

== See also ==
- List of Italian television series
