= Graveyard Disturbance =

1987 television film directed by Lamberto Bava

- DVD cover for Graveyard Disturbance
- Italian: Una notte al cimitero
- Genre: Horror
- Screenplay by: Dardano Sacchetti; Lamberto Bava
- Story by: Dardano Sacchetti
- Directed by: Lamberto Bava
- Starring: Gregory Lech Thaddeus; Lea Martino; Beatrice Ring; Gianmarco Tognazzi; Karl Zinny
- Composers: Simon Boswell; Mario Tagliaferri

Production
- Executive producers: Massimo Manasse; Marco Grillo Spina
- Cinematography: Gianlorenzo Battaglia; Gianfranco Transunto
- Editors: Mauro Bonnani; Daniele Alabis
- Running time: 93 minutes
- Production companies: Dania Film; Reteitalia

Original release
- Network: Italia 1
- Release: October 1987

Graveyard Disturbance (Italian: Una notte al cimitero) is a 1987 television film directed by Lamberto Bava.

== Plot ==
Five teen friends after stealing from a store end up in a gothic cemetery. While there they enter a tavern where the bartender challenges them to stay the night in a cursed crypt and if they survive the night, they get a treasure.

== Cast ==
- Gregory Lech Thaddeus as Robin
- Lea Martino as Tina
- Beatrice Ring as Micky, Davids sister
- Gianmarco Tognazzi as Gianni
- Karl Zinny as David, Micky's brother
- Lino Salemme as tavern owner

== Production ==
Following the success of the film Demons and Demons 2 and other foreign horror films in Italy, the company Reiteitalia would announce in July 1986 that a series titled Brivido giallo which would be made featuring five made-for-television film directed by Lamberto Bava. Of these films only four would be made: Graveyard Disturbance, Until Death, The Ogre and Dinner with a Vampire.

Graveyard Disturbance was originally developed under the title Dentro il cimitero (transl. Inside the Cemetery). Bava described the film as being not as heavy as his Demons films and would have more "relaxed" and "tongue-in-cheek" approach. The film is set in the countryside around Bolsena.

== Releases ==
Graveyard Disturbance was first shown at the Sitges Film Festival in Spain in October 1987. Lamberto Bava introduced the film himself, telling the audience that it was not intended for theatrical release. The film received a chorus of boos from the audience. It was later aired on Italia 1 on August 8, 1989.

== Reception ==
Kim Newman wrote in his book Nightmare Movies that Graveyard Disturbance was an uninspired spoof and Bava's worst film to date.
