= Claudio Spadaro =

Italian actor (1953–2026)

- Born: 17 June 1953; Taranto, Italy
- Died: 10 June 2026 (aged 72); Taranto, Italy
- Occupation: Actor

Claudio Spadaro (17 June 1953 – 10 June 2026) was an Italian actor. He died on 10 June 2026, at the age of 72.
