= The Ogre (1989 film) =

Italian 1989 horror film by Lamberto Bava

- DVD cover
- Italian: La casa dell'orco
- Genre: Horror
- Screenplay by: Dardano Sacchetti; Lamberto Bava
- Story by: Dardano Sacchetti
- Directed by: Lamberto Bava
- Starring: Paolo Malco; Virginia Bryant; Sabrina Ferilli; Alice Di Giuseppe
- Composers: Simon Boswell; Mario Tagliaferri

Production
- Executive producers: Massimo Manasse; Marco Grillo Spina
- Cinematography: Gianlorenzo Battaglia; Gianfranco Transunto
- Editors: Mauro Bonnani; Daniele Alabis
- Running time: 96 minutes
- Production companies: Dania Film; Reteitalia

Original release
- Network: Italia 1
- Release: August 22, 1989

The Ogre is a 1989 Italian television horror film directed by Lamberto Bava and written by Dardano Sacchetti. It was among four films made for the Italian television series Brivido Giallo. The film released outside of Italy as Demons III: The Ogre, where it was promoted as a sequel to Bava's films Demons and Demons 2.

== Synopsis ==
Cheryl, an American writer of horror novels, travels with her husband Tom, and their young son Bobby, to a villa in rural Italy for a few weeks of vacation, and for Cheryl to work on her latest book. When Cheryl begins having nightmares from when she was a child of being stalked by an ugly being, an ogre, she tries to persuade her skeptical husband that the villa has a curse on it and it is using its power to manifest her nightmares into reality, including the demon/ogre. Cheryl must find a way to face her fear and somehow defeat the ogre before it starts claiming victims.

== Production ==
Following the success of the film Demons and Demons 2 and other foreign horror films in Italy, the company Reiteitalia would announce in July 1986 that a series titled Brivido giallo which would be made featuring five made-for-television films directed by Lamberto Bava. Of these films only four would be made: Graveyard Disturbance, Until Death, The Ogre and Dinner with a Vampire. The films were shot between 1987 and 1988.

The screenplay for The Ogre is similar to that of the one written for The House by the Cemetery, which at one point director Lamberto Bava was slated to direct. Bava explained that the scripts were similar as The Ogre was based on the Sacchetti's original script for The House by the Cemetery which was altered by its director Lucio Fulci. Sacchetti countered these claims, stating that the films were not the same story but were "part of [his] poetics regarding home and children: a recurring theme which I have explored several times with different shades, but also with assonances." Bava stated that the script for the film suffered from a lot of self-censorship, noting that "An issue in the script was when the ogre showed up. What could we do with it? Had it been a movie .... the ogre would eat children, but on TV you couldn't do that."

== Releases ==
The Ogre was shown on Italia 1 on August 22, 1989. The film was released outside Italy as Demons III: The Ogre as it was promoted as a sequel to Demons and Demons 2. A German DVD release of the film titled it Ghost House II relating the film to Umberto Lenzi's film Ghosthouse.
