= Unomattina in famiglia =

- Also known as: Mattina 2 (1989-1993), Mattina in famiglia (1993-2010), In famiglia - Mattina 2 (2003-2004)
- Genre: Morning news and talk
- Directed by: Marco Aprea (since 2010)
- Presented by: Beppe Convertini, Monica Setta and Ingrid Muccitelli
- Country of origin: Italy
- Original language: Italian
- No. of seasons: 35

Production
- Executive producer: Daniela Zefferi
- Production location: Rome
- Running time: 225 min (2009-2010, Saturday), 110 min (Saturday, since 2010), 200 min (2009-2010, Sunday), 180 min (Sunday, 2010-2022), 160 min (Sunday, from 2022)

Original release
- Network: Rai 2 (1989-2010, 13 December 2020), Rai 1 (since 2010)
- Release: 2 December 1989 – present

Unomattina in famiglia is an Italian television programme, a spin-off of Unomattina, broadcast on Rai 2 from 1989 to 2010 and on Rai 1 since 2010. Since 2023, it has been hosted by Beppe Convertini, Ingrid Muccitelli, and Monica Setta.

During the live broadcast on 26 November 2011, featuring the firefighters of Barcellona Pozzo di Gotto responding to the flood in Messina, a gaffe occurred. The presenters mistakenly announced the recovery of a missing person, when in fact the individual had died. Presenter Miriam Leone, unaware of the situation, asked the firefighters, "How are you?" in reference to the missing person, believing that they may still be alive.
