= Body Puzzle =

1992 Italian film by Lamberto Bava

- Misteria
- Directed by: Lamberto Bava
- Screenplay by: Lamberto Bava; Teodoro Agrimi; Bruce Martin
- Story by: Teodoro Agrimi; Domenico Paolella
- Starring: Joanna Pacula; Tomas Arana; François Montagut; Gianni Garko; Erika Blanc
- Cinematography: Luigi Kuveiller
- Edited by: Pietro Bozza
- Music by: Carlo Maria Cordio
- Production company: P.A.C.
- Release date: 1992
- Running time: 99 minutes
- Country: Italy
- Language: Italian

Body Puzzle (native title Misteria) is a 1992 Italian Giallo film directed by Lamberto Bava. The film is about a psychopath (François Montagutt) who leaves body parts outside the house of a young widow (Joanna Pacula). The film was one of the last films released by P.A.C. in Italy before its bankruptcy. The film was re-released in Italy as Misteria after legal issues of using Carl Orff's Carmina Burana as music in the film came to the front.

== Production ==
Body Puzzle was a return to theatrically released films from director Lamberto Bava after a series of television works. The film's script was the work of an American writer Bruce Martin that was re-written by Teodoro Agrimi and Bava with the author's permission. The film was shot in 1991.

Bava did not get along with the producers while filming. Bava argued with the producers of the film who wanted a say in the direction. Bava later stated that he was offered to direct to more pictures with the producers, which he refused to do. Bava was also frustrated with the score by Carlo Mario Cordio, and during post-production had it replaced with parts of Carl Orff's Carmina Burana.

== Release ==
Body Puzzle was released in 1992. Legal issues due to the use of Orff's music without permission led to the film being re-released and slightly re-edited with Modest Mussorgsky's Night on Bald Mountain used in its place under the title Misteria. According to critic and film historian Roberto Curti, the film was released to "bad distribution and minimal box office". The film was one of the last films to be released by P.A.C. before going bankrupt.

The film was released on home video in the United Kingdom and the United States in the 1990s and on Laserdisc in the United States.

== Reception ==
From retrospective reviews, Adrian Luther Smith in his 1999 book on Italian sex and horror films found the film to be "one of the better horror thrillers" from Italy in recent years specifically noting the quality of the cast.
