= Urbano Barberini =

Italian actor

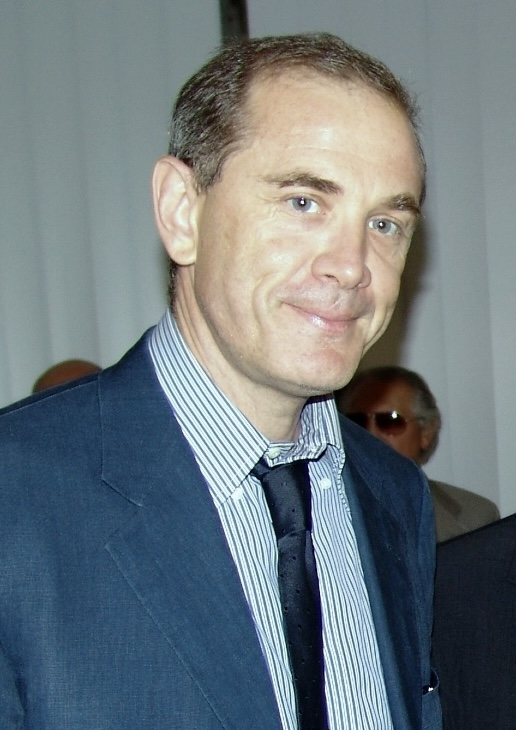
- Barberini in 2009
- Born: Riario Sforza Barberini Colonna di Sciarra; 18 September 1961 (age 64); Rome, Lazio, Italy
- Occupation: Actor
- Years active: 1984–present
- Spouse: Viviana Broglio (2018–present)

Urbano Barberini Riario Sforza Colonna di Sciarra (born 18 September 1961), best known as Urbano Barberini or sometimes Urbano Barberini Sforza, is an Italian actor. He is also a translator, theater producer and artistic director. He is fluent in Italian and French languages and is mostly known for starring or appearing in many horror, fantasy and drama films, including the cult classic Dèmoni (Demons).

His most recognized role in the English-speaking countries was in his work in Dario Argento's film Opera though in the English dubbing, his voice was replaced with another actor's deeper voice. The only DVD that retains his original voice on the English dub is the UK release from Arrow Films.

In 2024 he published his first book, La bellezza nel destino.

== Personal life ==
He is the only son and heir of Mirta Barberini Colonna di Sciarra, heiress of the Princes of Carbognano, and Count Alberto Riario Sforza (a cadet son of Giovanni Riario Sforza, Prince of Ardore).

He is the 11th Prince of Carbognano, and Hereditary Bailiff of San Sebastiano al Palatino of the Sovereign Military Order of Malta.

Urbano Barberini is married to Viviana Broglio and has a son; he considers himself Roman Catholic.

== Filmography ==
- Windsurf - Il vento nelle mani (1984) – Luca Stella
- Dario Argento's World of Horror (1985) – Himself
- Il diavolo sulle colline (1985)
- Dèmoni (1985) – George
- La vita di scorta (1986)
- Otello (1986) – Cassio
- Until Death (1987) a.k.a. The Changeling 2 – Marco
- Gor (1987) – Tarl Cabot
- Opera (1987) – Inspector Alan Santini
- Miss Arizona (1988) – Stanley
- Outlaw of Gor (1988) – Prof. Tarl Cabot
- The Black Cat (1989) – Marc Ravenna
- Torrents of Spring (1989) – Baron Von Doenhof
- Rouge Venise (1989)
- Courage Mountain (1989) – Italian Captain
- Strepitosamente... flop (1991) – Massimo
- Moses (1996) – Nahbi
- Ultimo bersaglio (1996) – Wolf Körmendi
- Stella's Favor (1996) – Tommy
- Come mi vuoi (1996) – Gaia
- The Eighteenth Angel (1997) – Monk
- Le complici (1998)
- Borderline (1998) – Alex
- Milonga (1999) – Person B
- Il diario di Matilde Manzoni (2002)
- Adored: Diary of a Porn Star (2003) – Federico Soldani
- Signora (2004) – Marcello
- Nel mio amore (2004) – Fausto
- The Fine Art of Love (2005) – Prince
- Casino Royale (2006) – Tomelli
- Fantasmi al Valle (2012)
- Roam Rome Mein (2019)
- Diabolik (2021) – Duncan
- Diabolik: Ginko Attacks! (2022) – Duncan
