= Turno di notte (TV series) =

- Country of origin: Italy
- No. of seasons: 1
- No. of episodes: 15

Original release
- Network: Rai Due
- Release: 1987 – 1988

Turno di notte (transl. Night Shift) is an Italian television series produced by Dario Argento. It had one season of 15 episodes running from 1987 to 1988.

== Production ==
Dario Argento worked in television as a producer of the series which consisted of 15 episodes. The series revolves around stories that happen to cab drivers during a night shift. Episodes were directed by Luigi Cozzi and Lamberto Bava.

The series was broadcast on Rai Due between late 1987 and early 1988.

== See also ==
- List of Italian television series
