= Trettré =

Italian stand-up comedy trio

The Trettré are a trio of Italian actors and stand-up comedians who gained great popularity in the early 1980s with their participation in many TV programs like Drive In. The trio was formed by Gino Cogliandro, Mirko Setaro, and Eduardo Romano.

The Trettré, a Neapolitan group, were formed in 1975. Gino Cogliandro has gone on to complete many acting and writing projects, and is extremely popular in Italy.
