= Simon Boswell =

English composer, conductor, and musician (born 1953)

- Born: 15 October 1953 (age 72)
- Origin: London, England, United Kingdom
- Genres: Film score
- Occupations: Composer, conductor, musician, producer
- Website: simonboswell.com

Simon Boswell (born 15 October 1953) is an English film score composer, conductor, producer and musician. His body of work includes over 100 credits.

He was nominated for the BAFTA TV Award for Best Original Television Music for the drama series The Lakes, the Anthony Asquith Film Award for Best Original Film Music for the film Hardware and was nominated for a Goya Award for Best Original Score for the film Perdita Durango.

== Early life ==
Boswell was born in London in 1953. He studied at The Haberdashers' Aske's Boys' School and English literature at Pembroke College, Cambridge.

Playing the guitar since age 12, he was an accomplished guitarist and was signed by Transatlantic Records in 1975 whilst still at college. This led to the release of his first solo album, "The Mind Parasites", a collection of contemporary acoustic songs and instrumentals.

He formed the band Advertising in 1977. Boswell later became a record producer both in the United Kingdom and Italy. He produced Renato Zero's album and album of Nino Buonocore.

== Career ==
=== Film scoring ===
Boswell's film career started in 1985, and since then he has countless awards from around the world and has been nominated twice for a BAFTA award.

Boswell has also worked on two projects with the Vatican. "Santo Subito" was his first project, which was a film collaboration setting the speeches and the singing of Pope John Paul II to Boswell's music and visuals. Boswell more recently composed for and produced the album "Alma Mater", featuring Pope Benedict XVI.

=== Television scoring ===
Boswell has composed for BAFTA nominated TV series The Lakes, and collaborated with film-maker Brian Hill and poet Simon Armitage on "Pornography: The Musical" and "Songbirds".

=== Other music ===
Boswell has worked with musicians from bands such as Blur, Orbital, The Sex Pistols and Echo And The Bunnymen. In 1982 he produced and arranged the album Via Tagliamento 1965-1970 for the Renato Zero. His credits as arranger and producer includes albums by Amii Stewart, Tony Esposito, Tullio De Piscopo and Nino Buonocore.

In Autumn 2006, his album Close Your Eyes was released on his own Flick Records

Quote: "I cut up my previous scores into bits and re-assembled them as new songs mixing full orchestra with musicians from Blur and The Kills and spoken word parts for some of the actors and directors I have worked with along the way – including Ewan McGregor, Ray Winstone, Goran Visnij, Dario Argento and Alejandro Jodorowsky."

=== Art ===
Boswell continues to work on an art project called BLINK!, an audio-visual installation looped to last forever of portraits extracted from news footage, and individually scored with their own soundtracks. This was first exhibited at the ICA in London in 2002 on 4 simultaneous cinema-sized screens.

== Personal life ==
He married and divorced, having had a son named Jack; he lived with the actress Lysette Anthony and has a son by her, Jimi, born in 2004. In 2008 Jimi was diagnosed with juvenile arthritis. Simon is now married to the contemporary fine artist Lg White who is also the lead singer in his band 'The And', who are performing Simon's film score's Live.

== Filmography ==
=== Film ===
2013

- Ashens and the Quest for the GameChild

2012

- The ABCs of Death

2008

- My Zinc Bed
- Bathory
- Slapper
- Rovdyr (aka Manhunt - English title)

2006

- Free Jimmy
- Incubus

2005

- The River King (Theme)

2004

- Churchill: The Hollywood Years
- In My Father's Den

2003

- Summer in the Golden Valley
- The Sleeping Dictionary
- Octane (with British electronica band Orbital)

2002

- The White Darkness
- Hypnotic
- Alien Love Triangle

2001

- The Secret Glory

2000

- Born Romantic
- There's Only One Jimmy Grimble
- Circus

1999

- Women Talking Dirty
- The Debtors
- A Midsummer Night's Dream
- This Year's Love
- The War Zone

1998

- Cousin Bette
- Desserts
- Dad Savage
- The Fishmonger's Daughter

1997

- American Perfekt
- Photographing Fairies
- Perdita Durango

1995

- Lord of Illusions
- Hackers

1994

- Shallow Grave
- Burn:Cycle
- Second Best

1993

- Dust Devil

1992

- The Crying Game

1990

- Hardware
- Voice of the Moon

1989

- Santa Sangre

1988

- The Ogre
- Dinner with a Vampire

1987

- Delirium
- Until Death
- Graveyard Disturbance
- Stage Fright

1986

- Demoni 2

1985

- Phenomena

=== Television ===
2007

- Tin Man
- Nearly Famous (6 episodes)
- Catwalk Dogs

2006

- Jackanory (2 episodes)
- The Magician of Samarkand
- Muddle Earth

2004

- Sea of Souls (2 episodes)

2003

- Pornography: The Musical

2002

- Widows

2001

- Mind Games

2000

- Jason and the Argonauts

1999

- Tube Tales (segment "Bone")

1998

- Killer Net

== Discography ==
2004

- In My Father's Den - Music Recordist

2003

- Octane - Soundtrack Producer

1999

- Women Talking Dirty - Music Arranger
- The Debtors - Conductor

1998

- Cousin Bette - Music Arranger and Producer

1994

- Second Best - Music Arranger
- Burn:Cycle - Soundtrack Producer

1987

- Fino alla morte (TV) - Music Arranger
