= Demons (1985 film) =

1985 Italian horror film directed by Lamberto Bava

- Theatrical release poster
- Italian: Dèmoni
- Directed by: Lamberto Bava
- Screenplay by: Dario Argento; Lamberto Bava; Dardano Sacchetti; Franco Ferrini
- Story by: Dardano Sacchetti
- Produced by: Dario Argento
- Starring: Urbano Barberini; Natasha Hovey
- Cinematography: Gianlorenzo Battaglia
- Edited by: Piero Bozza
- Music by: Claudio Simonetti
- Production company: DAC Film
- Distributed by: Titanus
- Release date: 4 October 1985 (Italy)
- Running time: 88 minutes
- Country: Italy
- Box office: 1.225 million Italian lire

Demons (Italian: Dèmoni) is a 1985 Italian horror film directed by Lamberto Bava, produced and co-written by Dario Argento, and starring Urbano Barberini and Natasha Hovey. The plot follows two female university students who, along with a number of random people, are given complimentary tickets to a mysterious movie screening, where they soon find themselves trapped in the theater with a horde of ravenous demons.

The story was originally planned to be part of a three-story horror anthology film written by Dardano Sacchetti, but Bava took interest in the story more than the others, so he and Sacchetti began developing it into a separate feature. Argento, beginning to be interested in producing films, would contribute to the screenplay with Franco Ferrini, who was brought in by Argento. Filming took place in Berlin and Rome in the summer of 1985. The film features an instrumental score composed by Claudio Simonetti, as well as a soundtrack that includes songs by Mötley Crüe, Accept and Billy Idol.

Distributed by Titanus, Demons received a theatrical release in Italy in October 1985. It was followed by a 1986 sequel, Demons 2, also directed by Bava and produced by Argento. A third Demons film was conceived, but was completely rewritten and released as The Church (1989), directed by Michele Soavi.

== Plot ==
On the Berlin U-Bahn, a mysterious man in a metallic mask offers university student Cheryl two tickets to a free screening at the Metropol, an isolated and recently renovated local cinema. Cheryl talks her friend Kathy into going with her; at the theater, they meet two preppy college boys, George and Ken. Other attendees of the screening include a blind man and his guide niece; a married couple; a boyfriend and girlfriend; and a pimp named Tony along with his two prostitutes. One of the prostitutes, Rosemary, accidentally scratches her face with a bizarre mask that is on display in the lobby. The film being shown is a violent, disturbing horror film about four teenagers who discover an old tomb and dig up the grave of the 16th-century fortune-teller Nostradamus. When the teenagers dig up Nostradamus's coffin, they find no body and instead an old book and a mask, identical to the strange mask in the lobby. When one of the movie's characters puts the mask on and is scratched by it just like Rosemary was by its doppelgänger, he then turns evil and slaughters his friends.

With her scratch still bleeding, Rosemary goes to the bathroom, where she transforms into a bloodthirsty, red-eyed demon similar to the one in the film. Rosemary attacks her friend, Gina, who then transforms into a demon in front of the rest of the cinemagoers. The group of uninfected people race to the exits, only to find that they have all been bricked up, making escape impossible. Although they attempt to barricade themselves in the balcony, many are attacked and infected by the demons. One of the demons escapes into the city when four punks break into the building through a back entrance; the punks are soon transformed into demons as well.

In the cinema, only George and Cheryl remain uninfected. Using a display motorcycle and sword props from the foyer, they ride through the auditorium, slicing down many demons. George kills nearly all of them when suddenly, a helicopter crashes through the roof. George and Cheryl use an emergency grappling hook and winch to climb to the roof, where they are attacked by the mysterious man from the subway. They are able to kill him by impaling his head on an exposed bit of rebar. The two climb down to the street and discover that the demonic infection has spread throughout Berlin. They are then chased by a horde of demons before being picked up by a jeep with a well-armed family.

As they drive out of the city to safety, Cheryl (having been infected at some point in the theater) transforms into a demon. Before she can harm George, one of the family members shoots her with a shotgun, killing her. As Cheryl's body collapses into the roadway, George —now the sole survivor of the cinema— and the group drive out of the city to an unknown future.

== Cast ==
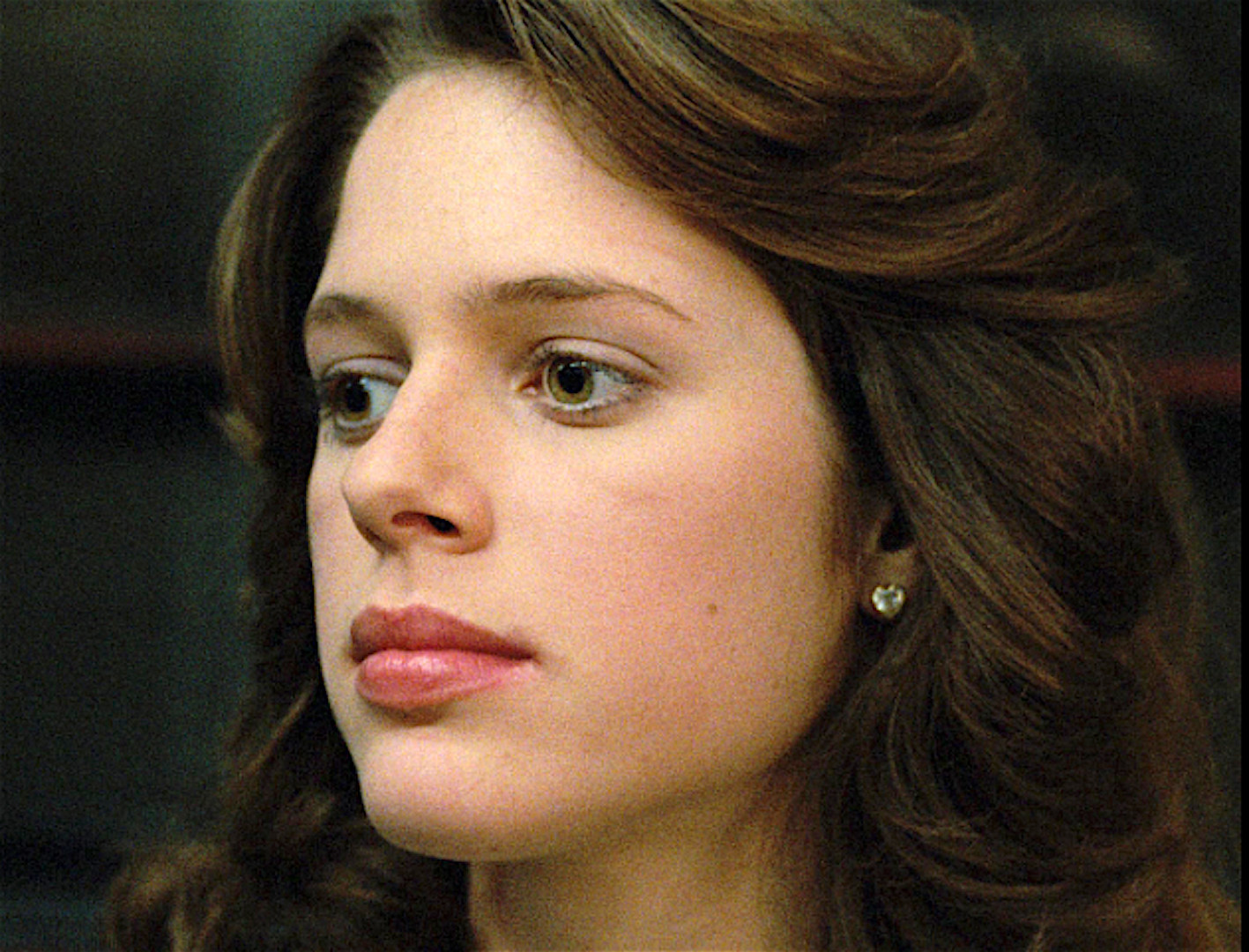
Natasha Hovey in 1987

- Urbano Barberini as George
- Natasha Hovey as Cheryl
- Karl Zinny as Ken
- Fiore Argento as Hannah
- Paola Cozzo as Kathy
- Fabiola Toledo as Carmen
- Nicoletta Elmi as Ingrid
- Stelio Candelli as Frank
- Nicole Tessier as Ruth
- Geretta Giancarlo as Rosemary
- Bobby Rhodes as Tony
- Gianguido Baldi as Tommy
- Bettina Ciampolini as Nina
- Giuseppe Mauro Cruciano as Hot Dog
- Sally Day as Liz
- Peter Pitsch as Baby Pig
- Lino Salemme as Ripper
- Alex Serra as Werner
- Claudio Spadaro as Max
- Giovanni Frezza as Kirk
- Michele Soavi as Man in Mask/Jerry (Horror Film)
- Eliana Hoppe as Edith (Horror Film)
- Jasmine Maimone as Nancy (Horror Film)
- Marcello Modugno as Bob (Horror Film)

== Production ==
=== Development ===
Following the release of a giallo A Blade in the Dark, the action film Blastfighter, and the science fiction horror film Monster Shark, director Lamberto Bava considered writing a three part horror film anthology film written by Dardano Sacchetti, similar to his father's film Black Sabbath. One of the stories involved monsters that came from a movie theatre screen and attacked the audience, a story that Bava liked more than the other two and began developing it into a feature film.

Dardano and Bava took their 25-page treatment for the film to producer Fabrizio De Angelis, who wanted to use footage from Lucio Fulci's films as the film within a film to cut costs. The two would also take the treatment to Luciano Martino who suggested the two to produce the film themselves. Meanwhile, Dario Argento, who was fresh from the financial success of Phenomena (1985) and was beginning to be interested in producing films as he had done previously with Dawn of the Dead. Argento began looking for films to produce, first reading a science fiction script from Luigi Cozzi which he was not convinced with, and then meeting with Bava who agreed to produce Demons.

Sacchetti was not content with Argento's suggestions for the script, later stating that Argento brought in Franco Ferrini who he felt only tried to please Argento. Ferrini stated his contributions to the script was to post-pone the appearance of the demons, which he said originally appeared much earlier in the film. Sacchetti then said Argento paid him and had him leave the project, only to invite him back towards the end to give the script a final polish. Sacchetti later remarked that the first half of the film's story was the same as the original script while the second half had more blood and gore and special effect scenes.

=== Filming ===
Demons was shot in nine weeks in June and July 1985. It was shot on location in West Berlin and at De Paolis Studios in Rome. The idea to have the demons' eyes glow in the film came to Bava on set, who said when filming a scene where the demons approach the camera involved the actors wearing refractive paper which caused the effect.In addition to playing both the Man in the Mask and Jerry, Michele Soavi also directed the "film-within-a-film" sequences.

Special makeup effects were handled by Sergio Stivaletti, who would become Argento's regular collaborator.

== Soundtrack ==
The film's instrumental score was composed and performed by Argento's regular collaborator Claudio Simonetti.

The soundtrack was released on LP by RCA Records and features 1980s rock and heavy metal themes. The soundtrack was performed live for the film's thirty-year anniversary at Shock Pop Comiccon in February 2015.

=== Track listing ===
- Billy Idol - "White Wedding"
- Accept - "Fast as a Shark"
- Mötley Crüe - "Save Our Souls"
- Claudio Simonetti - "Demon"
- Claudio Simonetti - "Killing"
- Claudio Simonetti - "Out of Time"
- Rick Springfield - "Walking on the Edge"
- Pretty Maids - "Night Danger" (US movie version)
- Go West - "We Close Our Eyes"
- The Adventures - "Send My Heart"
- Saxon - "Everybody Up"
- Scorpions - “Dynamite” (Original Italian Version, Replaced by “Night Danger” in the US Version”)

== Release ==
Demons was distributed theatrically in Italy by Titanus on 4 October 1985. The film grossed a total of 1,225,490,000 Italian lire domestically, making it the 39th highest-grossing film in Italy that year, more than Cat's Eye, Silver Bullet and A Nightmare on Elm Street. The film was distributed elsewhere in the world in 1986 including the United States, France and Hong Kong. The film was planned to be released in the United Kingdom but its release was seemingly canceled.

=== Reception ===
In a contemporary review, Kim Newman stated in The Monthly Film Bulletin that "Demons suffers from the same uncertain, over-emphatic tone that brought down producer Dario Argento's own Phenomena" and that "the film has horror effects aplenty—gory deaths, transformations into dribbling monsters, a demon bursting out of a girl's back—and an interesting set of ideas and situations, but flounders badly as it tried to build up a high energy cumulative effect."

Demons currently holds a 73% approval rating on review aggregator website Rotten Tomatoes based on 15 reviews, with a weighted average of 6.10/10. Leonard Maltin gave the film 1 1/2 out of 4 stars, criticizing the film's lack of characterizations, logic and plot.

The film was listed at number 53 on American TV channel Bravo's The 100 Scariest Movie Moments countdown.

From retrospective reviews, Newman commented in Sight & Sound that the film was "the sort of picture it takes at least four people [...] to write: it isn't so much scripted as assembled," featuring "one note characters". Newman commented on the series stating that they "have many problems of 80s cinema: everyone wears a puffy jacket and has puffier hair, characters like the coke snorting punks of Demons and the bad boy/bad driver of Demons 2 come from middle aged imagination rather than the streets of Berlin". Newman concluded that both Demons and its sequel were "chaotic, inconsistent, blithely indifferent to storytelling and as prone to cack-handed unintentional comedy as gross out horror, these are guilty pleasures, but their demented glee makes themaptly—ideal party horror movies."

== Sequel ==
Following the commercial success of Demons, Argento and his collaborators began work on a sequel titled Demons 2 which was released on October 9, 1986 in Italy. Bava spoke of a second sequel as early as January 22, 1988 with Argento stating it would be called Ritorno alla casa dei demoni (transl. Return to the House of the Demons) The project for the third film later changed hands to eventually become The Church directed by Michele Soavi. Bava's television film The Ogre was released outside of Italy as Demons III: The Ogre.

== See also ==
- List of Italian films of 1985
- List of horror films of 1985
