= Lamberto Bava =

Italian film director (born 1944)

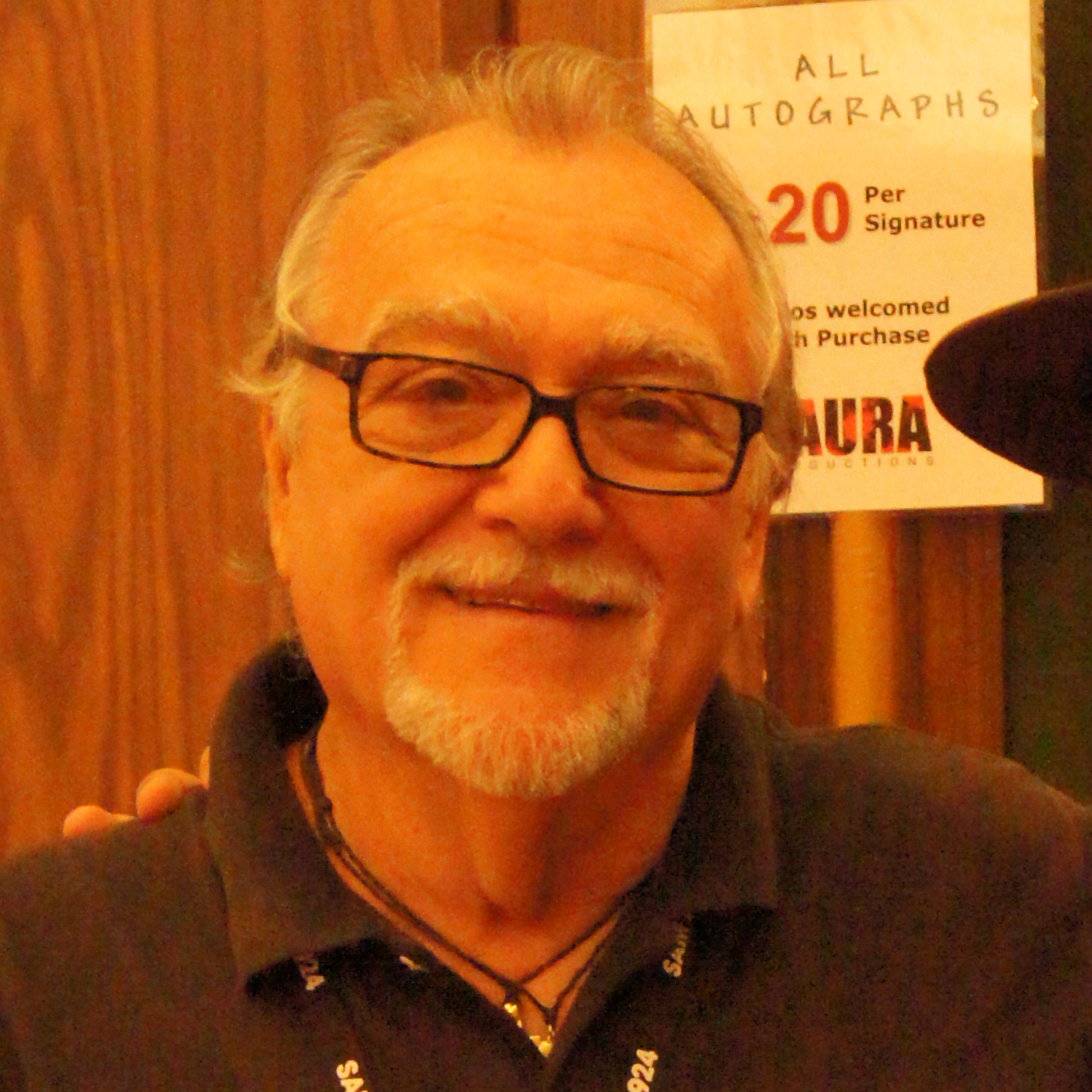
- Lamberto Bava at the 2012 Days of the Dead, Indianapolis, USA.
- Born: 3 April 1944 (age 82); Rome, Italy
- Other name: John Old Jr.
- Occupation: Film director
- Father: Mario Bava
- Relatives: Eugenio Bava (grandfather)

Signature
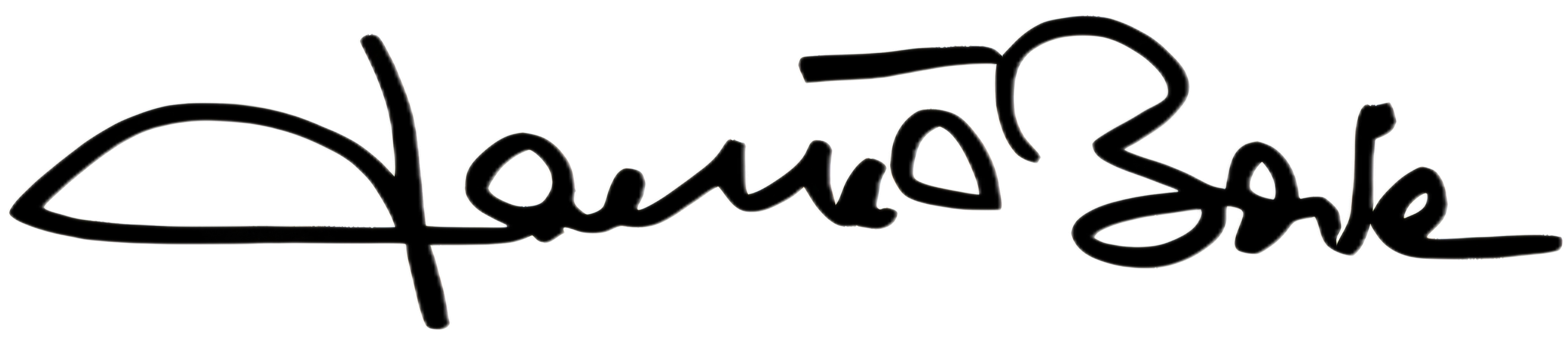

Lamberto Bava (born 3 April 1944) is an Italian film director. Born in Rome, Bava began working as an assistant director for his director father Mario Bava. Lamberto co-directed the 1979 television film La Venere d'Ille with his father and in 1980 directed his first solo feature film Macabre.

Bava continued working in the 1980s and collaborated with Dario Argento on films such as Demons. After 1990, Bava's work was predominantly involved with television, such as his Fantaghirò series.

== Biography ==
Lamberto Bava was born in Rome, Italy on 3 April 1944. Lamberto's father Mario Bava was a film director known primarily as a director of horror films. Lamberto's film career began in the mid-1960s working as an assistant director on his father's film Planet of the Vampires. Lamberto would later collaborate with his father on several of his projects, including Danger: Diabolik (1966), Twitch of the Death Nerve (1971) and Shock (1977) (On Shock, Lamberto Bava was credited as a screenwriter as well as an assistant director.) Besides the work he did with his father, Lamberto also contributed to making films with Italian director Ruggero Deodato, such as Ultimo mondo cannibale (1977) and Cannibal Holocaust (1979). In 1978, Lamberto and Mario directed an episode of the Italian television series I giochi del diavolo (Storie fantastiche dell'Ottocento) (transl. The Devil's Games - Fantastic Tales of the 1800), a television series with six stories based on 19th century fantastic literature. Their episode was based on La Venere d'Ille by Prosper Mérimée and broadcast on RAI 1 on March 27, 1981.

=== Early 1980s theatrical films ===
A meeting with director Pupi Avati led to Bava directing his own feature film Macabre in 1980 which was co-written with Pupi and Antonio Avati. The film stars Bernice Stegers as Jane, a woman who has an affair with a man (Stanko Molnar), who dies. After his death, Jane keeps his severed head in her refrigerator and performs erotic acts with it. Seeing Macabre, Mario told him "Now I can die in peace". Mario actually died later in 1980.

Following the release of Macabre, Lamberto Bava worked in advertising and continued to write stories for potential future film projects. He was approached by director Dario Argento to assist him with his giallo film Tenebre (1982), wherein Bava is credited as an assistant director. In 1983, Lamberto Bava directed his second feature film as a director, the giallo film A Blade in the Dark. A Blade in the Dark was originally developed as a television film shot in four 25-minute segments on a very low budget. The film stars Andrea Occhipinti as the music composer Bruno, a man who becomes involved in a series of murders while staying at a secluded villa.

Bava's next two film projects were in different genres than his previous giallo and horror film output. Bava was given a script for Blastfighter, a film originally written as a remake of the Australian film Mad Max with the intention of giving it to director Lucio Fulci. Blastfighter starred Michael Sopkiw as Tiger, a detective who had been released from prison for shooting the man who killed his wife. Tiger moves into the woods with his daughter where he is terrorized by a group of thugs. Lamberto's next film, Monster Shark, was a science fiction film about a mutated shark that goes on a killing spree with two marine biologists attempting to track down the creature to stop it.

=== Late 1980s theatrical and television films ===
In 1985, Lamberto Bava reteamed with Dario Argento on the film Demons. Argento co-wrote and produced Bava's film about a theater showing invitation-only screenings of a horror film. In the theater's lobby, a young woman is scratched by a display in the lobby and transforms into a hideous creature who then attacks other audience members, spreading her demonic infection. The film was followed by the sequel Demons 2 in 1986 which had many of the same cast and crew members from Demons. Demons 2 features a television program which causes an outbreak of zombies in an apartment complex. Bava also made the television film Midnight Killer the same year. The film is about a series of murders which are similar to one that was committed 15 years prior, despite the fact that the murderer supposedly died in a fire. Bava makes a cameo in the film as a photographer at the beginning of the film. While working on Midnight Killer, Bava began preparing his next film, Delirium (1987). Delirium stars Serena Grandi as Gioia, a model for Pussycat magazine. Gioia's co-workers end up murdered through bizarre means including pitchforks and bees and then their corpses posed in front of photos of her, which Gioia receives in the mail from the murderer.

Bava returned to television work making several episodes of a series of hour-long films produced by Dario Argento. Bava's episodes included "E ...di Moda la Morte", "Heavy Metal", "Buona Fine È Migliore Principo", "Giubetto Rosso", "Il Bambino Rapito" and "Babbao Natale". In July 1986, the company Reteitalia announced that they would new television films for a series titled Brivido giallo would be directed by Bava. The films were shot between 1987 and 1988 where there were initially going to be a series of five films, it ended up being four. The first was Graveyard Disturbance which was shown at the Sitges Film Festival in 1987 and Until Death which was released on home video in Germany over a year before its television debut in Italy in 1989. The other films in the series were The Ogre and Dinner with a Vampire.

The Brivido giallo series was not popular with critics or audiences which led to Bava's next television films in a series titled Alta tensione which were shot between 1988 and 1989 to be only be released in 1999 on the Mediaset network. One television film made at that time for the series was only released in 2007 on the satellite channel Fantasy TV. Bava also did a remake of Black Sunday for the European television series Sabbath titled La maschera del demonio which premiered in June 1990 at Rome's Fantafestival. Bava began the 1990s with the fairy tale inspired series Fantaghirò series and its many sequels.

=== Post-1980s works ===
In 1992, Bava made the film Body Puzzle, which starred Joanna Pacula, who learns that her late husband Abe had a lover named Tim Bell. When Tim learns that Abe was an organ donor, Tim begins killing people in order to rebuild him. Bava also worked in television. In 1991, Bava directed Fantaghiro, a television miniseries that was influenced by films such as Legend, Willow and Ladyhawke. The series was aimed more at family audiences than Bava's previous work and violence is kept to a minimum. The series concluded in 1997 with eight feature-length episodes. Before finishing the series, Bava worked on other television projects, including Desideria, between 1994 and 1995, and a second fantasy series titled Sorellina e il Principe del Sogno (1996). In the late 1990s, Bava made another television film entitled Caraibi. Bava's more recent film work includes L'Impero, and Ghost Son.

== Filmography ==
Title	Year	Credited as				Notes	Ref(s)
Title	Year	Director	Screenwriter	Assistant director	Other	Notes	Ref(s)
The Road to Fort Alamo	1964			Yes			
Planet of the Vampires	1965			Yes			
Savage Gringo	1966			Yes			
Kill, Baby, Kill	1966			Yes			
Dr. Goldfoot and the Girl Bombs	1966			Yes			
Danger: Diabolik	1968			Yes			
Hatchet for the Honeymoon	1970			Yes			
Roy Colt & Winchester Jack	1970			Yes			
Baron Blood	1972			Yes			
The Kiss	1974			Yes			
Lisa and the Devil	1974			Yes			
Last Cannibal World	1977			Yes	Yes	Continuity	
Shock	1977		Yes	Yes			
Inferno	1980			Yes			
Cannibal Holocaust	1980			Yes			
Macabre	1980	Yes	Yes				.
Tenebrae	1982			Yes			
A Blade in the Dark	1983	Yes			Yes	Producer, editing	
Blastfighter	1984	Yes					
Monster Shark	1984	Yes					
Demons	1985	Yes	Yes				
Demons 2	1986	Yes	Yes				
Midnight Killer	1986	Yes	Yes		Yes	Producer, film editor	
Delirium	1987	Yes					
Body Puzzle	1992	Yes	Yes				
Rabid Dogs	1998			Yes			
The Torturer	2005	Yes	Yes				
Ghost Son	2007	Yes	Yes				
Twins	—N/a	Yes				Shot in 2016; unreleased as of April 2025	

=== Television work ===
Title	Year	Credited as			Notes	Ref(s)
Title	Year	Director	Screenwriter	Other	Notes	Ref(s)
"La Venere d'ille"	1981	Yes	Yes			
Graveyard Disturbance	1987	Yes	Yes	Yes	Uncredited role as the Shop Keeper.	
Until Death	1988	Yes	Yes			
The Ogre	1989	Yes	Yes	Yes	Uncredited role as a man in the bar	
Dinner with a Vampire	1989	Yes	Yes			
La maschera del demonio	1990	Yes				
The Prince of Terror	1999	Yes				
Eyewitness	1999	Yes				
School of Fear (Il Gioko)	1999	Yes				
The Man Who Didn't Want to Die	2007	Yes			Made in 1998, but not released until 2007	

- Turno di notte (Italian TV series)
- Fantaghirò
- Fantaghirò 2
- Fantaghirò 3
- The Dragon Ring (television film)
- Fantaghirò 4 (television film)
- Princess Alisea (television film)
- Fantaghirò 5 (television film)
- The Princess and the Pauper
- Pirates: Blood Brothers
- Human Currency (television miniseries)
- Visions of Murder (television film)
- Tailor-Made Murder (television film)
- Kammerspiel (television film)
