= Demons 2 =

- Directed by: Lamberto Bava
- Screenplay by: Dario Argento; Lamberto Bava; Franco Ferrini; Dardano Sacchetti; Sergio Stivaletti
- Story by: Dario Argento; Lamberto Bava; Franco Ferrini; Dardano Sacchetti; Sergio Stivaletti
- Produced by: Dario Argento
- Starring: David Knight; Nancy Brilli; Coralina Cataldi-Cassoni; Bobby Rhodes; Asia Argento; Virginia Bryant
- Cinematography: Gianlorenzo Battaglia
- Edited by: Piero Bozza
- Music by: Simon Boswell
- Production company: DAC Film
- Distributed by: Titanus
- Release date: 9 October 1986 (Italy)
- Running time: 92 minutes
- Country: Italy
- Box office: 1,105,944,000 Italian lire

Demons 2 (Italian: Dèmoni 2) is a 1986 Italian horror film directed by Lamberto Bava and produced by Dario Argento. It is a sequel to Bava's 1985 film Demons and stars David Knight, Nancy Brilli, Coralina Cataldi Tassoni, as well as Argento's youngest daughter, Asia Argento, in her debut film performance at age 10. In the film, demons invade the real world through a television broadcast, turning the residents of an apartment building into bloodthirsty monsters.

Filming for Demons 2 began in May 1986, seven months after the release of the first film. Shooting took place in Hamburg, Germany, and Rome. Demons 2 was released in theatres in Italy later that year, distributed by Titanus. Following the release of Demons 2, development on a third Demons film began. The follow-up project ultimately became The Church (1989), directed by Michele Soavi, which is not narratively connected to Demons or Demons 2. A direct sequel took the form of a novel written by Bava in 2025.

== Plot ==
Years after the sudden outbreak of Demons, (Note: As depicted in Demons (1985)) normal life has returned to the inhabitants of the big cities. Various residents of a high-rise apartment building are watching a horror film being broadcast on television; the film's story follows several teens who trespass into a city that was deserted and walled-off to contain the past Demon infestation. Finding a demon's corpse, one of the teens revives it accidentally when blood drips from a scratch into the demon's mouth.

Meanwhile in reality, a young woman named Sally celebrates her birthday at a party with her friends in the high-rise apartment. When one of her friends receives a call from a boy named Jacob and invites him to the party, she flies into a rage, screaming she does not want to see Jacob and demanding everyone leave. As she sequesters herself in her room, Sally watches part of the film on television. Suddenly, the demon on the television movie looks at her directly, then pushes through the television and attacks her, entering her body. She is unable to escape, as her friends have locked the door, so they can prepare her birthday cake in secret.

When her friends open the door and present the seemingly normal Sally with her cake, she suddenly transforms into a demon and attacks them, turning all but two of them into bloodthirsty monsters. The creature's bile seeps through the building, burning through the ceiling and into other apartments, and shorting out the electrical system. In one apartment, a dog licks up the bile and transforms into a vicious beast that attacks and kills its owner. In another apartment, a young boy left alone by his parents avoids Sally and her rampaging demon friends, but is poisoned by the bile and also becomes a monster.

The demon boy attacks Hannah, a pregnant woman waiting for her husband to come home. She kills the demon boy, but a smaller, flying demon bursts out of his body to further terrorize her. At the same time her husband, George, has been trapped in the elevator with another woman. As they escape through a service hatch, a security guard who turned into a demon after being scratched in the face by Sally bursts through the elevator door and infects the woman. She pursues George through the ceiling of the elevator cab. As he climbs the suspension cables above the cab, he kicks the demon away before entering his and Hannah's apartment just in time to kill the flying demon with an umbrella.

Meanwhile, a group of bodybuilders led by a gym instructor named Hank have barricaded themselves in the building's underground car park, along with a group of tenants. Unable to break down the garage doors, they defend themselves against the demons with shotguns and makeshift weapons, such as Molotov cocktails. The demons eventually force their way in. Although they outnumber the demons, the uninfected are either turned into demons themselves or killed, with the exception of a young girl named Ingrid, who becomes trapped in a car.

The infected start making their way back up the building. George causes a leak in the gas pipes that kills all the infected except Sally in an explosion. Hannah and George enter Sally's apartment, finding the two hidden partygoers. The four make their way to the roof but are stopped by Sally. She infects the two partygoers, but George dispatches them. George and Hannah lower themselves to the roof of an adjacent building, fighting and wounding Sally as they go. Inside the neighboring building, which is a television studio, Hannah gives birth to the couple's child. A blinded Sally appears and collapses, apparently dead. However, an image of Sally appears on several television monitors, running towards the viewer and presumably trying to attack them through the television as Sally herself was originally attacked. George smashes the monitors and he and Hannah exit with their newborn child.

== Cast ==
- David Knight as George
- Nancy Brilli as Hannah
- Coralina Cataldi Tassoni as Sally Day
- Asia Argento as Ingrid Haller
- Bobby Rhodes as Hank
- Virginia Bryant as Mary
- Anita Bartolucci as Miss Poole
- Antonio Cantafora as Mr. Haller
- Luisa Passega as Helga Haller

== Production ==
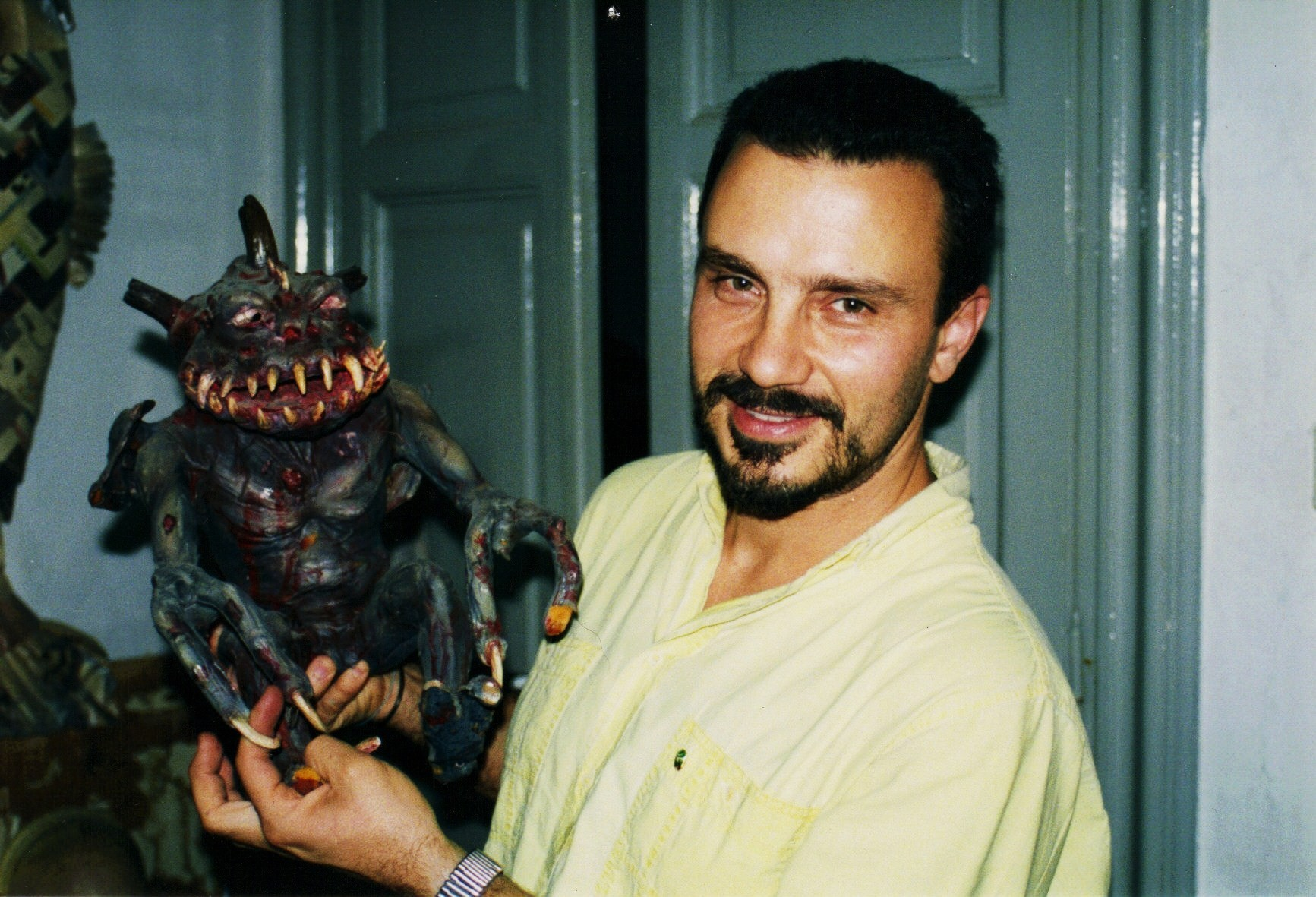
Special effects artist Sergio Stivaletti with "Menelik"

After the financial success of Demons in Italy, a sequel began development. The script for the film took several months to develop and according to director Lamberto Bava, Sergio Stivaletti took part in some script writing sessions. Demons 2 began shooting on May 19, 1986 just seven months after the release of the first film. Actor Bobby Rhodes was brought back to act in the second film as Hank, a gym trainer. The film was filmed on location in Hamburg and at De Paolis In.Ci.R. Studios in Rome.

According to Bava, Argento did not interfere in his shooting, stating that "Dario, like few people, is one of those who persuades you to give your best... and I must say that at the same time he fully respected my role as the director." Argento did visit the set of the film regularly but never gave direction on the film. Both Bava and Argento purposely lowered down the violent scenes in the film in order to receive a V.M.14 rating in Italy.

Sergio Stivaletti created an animatronic demon for the film nicknamed "Menelik", which was later said to have been copied from the creatures of Gremlins. Stivaletti denied the connection, stating that the inspiration behind the character was the painting Triptych of the Temptation of St. Anthony.

== Release ==
Demons 2 was distributed theatrically in Italy by Titanus on 9 October 1986. The film grossed a total of 1,105,944,000 Italian lire in Italy. The film was released in the United States on 13 February 1987 and in the United Kingdom on 18 September in the United Kingdom. It was released in West Germany on 9 July 1987 as Dance of the Demons 2/Dämonen.

== Critical reception ==
Based on 11 reviews, Demons 2 has an approval rating of 73% on Rotten Tomatoes.

AllMovie's review was negative, writing, "putting aside the simplistic plot, lousy dialogue and atrocious acting, Demons 2 is watchable for one reason: the bloody mechanical and makeup effects by Sergio Stivaletti". Reviewing the film on Blu-ray, Budd Wilkins of Slant Magazine rated it 3/5 stars and wrote that it "trades in its predecessor's penchant for wall-to-wall gore in favor of surreal shocks and quasi-Cronenbergian craziness". Writing in a retrospective for Dread Central, Matt Serafini called it "much more a mixed bag than its predecessor" but questioned why it never led to a series. Serafini suggested a new generation of Italian filmmakers continue the series, including the practical effects and new wave music of Demons 2.

Arrow Video released the first two films on Blu-ray and DVD on 30 April 2012 including a two-part comic titled Demons 3. The first part came with Demons and the last part with Demons 2.

== Sequel ==
In an interview conducted on January 22, 1988, directors Bava and Argento were discussing a follow-up to Demons 2 stating that they were working on a follow-up film, with Argento stating it would not be called Demons 3, but potentially Ritorno alla casa dei demoni (transl. Return to the House of the Demons). The third Demons film had a story developed by Franco Ferrini and Dardano Sacchetti which involved an airplane that had to make an emergency landing where it finds itself on an island with a volcano, stranding the passengers. Sacchetti explained that the situation was for them to arrive in a "weird hell" and compared the film to Alien, but with the isolated place being an airplane opposed to a spaceship and the demons replacing the aliens. After developing several drafts, the writers abandoned the story with Sacchetti stating that they had trouble creating a story set in an isolated area of the airplane. The screenwriters eventually developed a new screenplay set in a church which acted as a passage into hell which was developed into the film The Church without Bava.

A sequel novel entitled Demoni 3. La rinascita (transl. Demons 3: The Rebirth) was written by Lamberto Bava and published by Cut-Up Publishing in 2025. The plot involves the demons shifting from television to social media in order to spread.

== Footnotes ==
=== Sources ===
- Curti, Roberto (2019). Italian Gothic Horror Films, 1980-1989. McFarland. ISBN 978-1476672434.
