= Elisa Kadigia Bove =

Italian actress (born 1942)

- Born: 1942 (age 83–84); Mogadishu, British-administered Somaliland
- Occupation: actress
- Years active: 1960s–1980s
- Spouse: Achille Occhetto (divorced)
- Children: 2

Elisa Kadigia Bove (born 1942) is an Italian actress of Italian-Somali descent.

== Early life and career ==
Daughter of an Italian soldier and a Somali woman, Bove began her film career acting in commercials. She first gained renown during a television campaign for Atlantic, a popular 1970s TV-set brand. After attending the Piccolo Teatro directed by Giorgio Strehler, she began a long career as an actress and vocalist, between theater, film and television. She interpreted a number of compositions by the Italian avant-garde composer Luigi Nono, including A floresta é jovem e cheja de vida, Un volto del mare, Contrappunto dialettico alla mente, Y entonces comprendió. She debuted as an actress in the first feature film directed by Valentino Orsini. She later starred in some B-movies in the late 1960s and 1980s, while her last role was in a comedy directed by Cristina Comencini.

Bove later starred in a number of Italian feature films, particularly in the giallo horror genre. Of the latter, she appeared in the 1980 film Macabre by Lamberto Bava.

Besides cinematic work, Bove is the president of the Associazione Donne Immigrate Africane (ADIA; Association of African Immigrant Women), a non-profit organization serving immigrant women in Italy.

== Personal life ==
Bove was married to Italian politician Achille Occhetto, with whom she had two sons, Malcolm and Massimiliano (both born in Sicily).

== Filmography ==
- Macabre (1980)
- Occhio, malocchio, prezzemolo e finocchio (1983)

== See also ==
- Jonis Bashir
- Italian Somalis
