= Little Sir Nicholas (1990 TV series) =

- Based on: Little Sir Nicholas by C.A. Jones
- Written by: C.A. Jones
- Directed by: David Benedictus
- Starring: Rachel Gurney; Bernice Stegers; Jonathan Norris
- Country of origin: United Kingdom
- Original language: English
- No. of seasons: 1
- No. of episodes: 6

Production
- Running time: 26 minutes

Original release
- Network: BBC1
- Release: 3 January – 7 February 1990

Little Sir Nicholas is a 1990 TV series directed by David Benedictus and starring Rachel Gurney, Bernice Stegers and Jonathan Norris. Little Sir Nicholas is a story set in the Victorian era about heritage, identity and family rivalries. The six-part series was based on a Cecilia Anne Jones novel. Filming took place at Cape Cornwall and Kitley House, which is close to Plymouth.

== Plot ==
The story follows young Nicholas Tremaine, the heir to the wealthy Tremaine family estate. When Nicholas, along with his parents, Sir Walter and Lady Tremaine, are presumed lost at sea after their ship sinks in a storm, the family believes they have perished. However, unbeknownst to them, Nicholas survives the shipwreck and is washed ashore in a small fishing village in France, where he is taken in and raised by a kind French family. Years later, back in England, the Tremaine estate is left without a clear heir. Nicholas's grandmother, Lady Tremaine, is determined to find a legitimate successor to preserve the family legacy. Meanwhile, Joanna Tremaine, the ambitious mother of Gerald—a boy who has been raised as the temporary heir—wants to secure the inheritance for her son. When Nicholas is eventually discovered alive and brought back to England, his return threatens Gerald’s position, sparking tension and conflict within the family. Lady Tremaine warmly welcomes Nicholas and seeks to restore his rightful place as "Little Sir Nicholas," but Joanna Tremaine schemes to undermine him, creating a dramatic struggle over the inheritance.

== Cast ==
- Rachel Gurney as Lady Tremaine
- Bernice Stegers as Mrs. Tremaine (Joanna Tremaine)
- Jonathan Norris as Gerald Tremaine
- Louisa Milwood-Haigh as Margaret Tremaine
- Christopher Villiers as William Randle
- Jack Watson as Robinson
- David Rickard as Joe Snell
- Max Beazley as Sir Nicholas Tremaine
- Catherine Shipton as Dulcie
- Julian Paull as Tom Austen
- Julian Fellowes as Apted
- James Ellis as Penfold
- Paddy Ward as Baker
- Jenny McCracken as Mere Annette
- Veronica Clifford as Mrs. Snell
- Philip Whitchurch as Bootle
- Olivia Gillan as Lucie
- Emma Hunt as Peggy Austen
- Noel Johnson as Sir Nicholas Tremaine
- Barry Jackson as Nolan
- Jacki Webb as Shop proprietress
- Roger Adamson as Fisherman
- James March as Capt. Tremaine
- Chrissy Monk as Elizabeth
- Lee Goodwin as Young version of Tom Austen
