= Bernice Stegers =

British actress (born 1949)

- Born: 12 July 1949 (age 77); Liverpool, UK
- Occupation: Actress
- Years active: 1971–present
- Spouse: Mike Newell (m. 1980)

Bernice Mary Stegers (born 12 July 1949) is a British actress. She is known for her roles on television, as well as the horror films Macabre (1980) and Xtro (1982).

== Filmography ==
=== Film ===
Year	Title	Role	Notes	Ref.
1971	To Catch a Spy	Russian Girl		
1979	Dirty Money	Policewoman		
1980	Macabre	Jane Baker		
1980	City of Women	Woman on train		
1981	Quartet	Miss Nicholson		
1981	Light Years Away	Betty		
1982	Coming Out of the Ice	Lady Barber	Television film	
1982	Doll's Eye	Jane		
1983	Xtro	Rachel Phillips		
1984	Sharma and Beyond	Gabriella	Television film	
1986	Sky Bandits	Countess Olga		
1987	The Girl	Eva Berg		
1991	Prince of Shadows	Esposa de Darman		
1994	Four Weddings and a Funeral	Shop Assistant		
1997	The Garden of Redemption	Renata	Television film	
2001	Julie's Spirit	Madam		
2009	My Life in Ruins	Maria		
2012	Great Expectations	Mrs. Hubble		
2014	Suite Française	Madame Perrin		
2017	Disobedience	Fruma Hartog		
2018	The Guernsey Literary and Potato Peel Pie Society	Mrs. Burns		

=== Television ===
Year	Title	Role	Notes	Ref.
1975	Within These Walls	Sonia Grossman	Episode: "Let the People See"	
1976	Life and Death of Penelope	Imogen	6 episodes	
1976	Dickens of London	Lady	Miniseries	
1976	The New Avengers	Operator	Episode: "To Catch a Rat"	
1977	The Phoenix and the Carpet	Madame	Episode: "Queen of the Island"	
1977	Van der Valk	Anna Kuylen	Episode: "Wolf"	
1979	Park Ranger	Carol	Episode: "Fire!"	
1979	A Family Affair	Renate	Episode: "Adrift"	
1982	Tales of the Unexpected	Kaye	Episode: "The Eavesdropper"	
1983	Studio	Kate	Episode: "Art Begins at Forty"	
1984	Ellis Island	Renata	Miniseries	
1987	The Bretts	Tatyana	2 episodes	
1989	Summer's Lease	Louise Corduroy	Episode: "Where the Water Goes"	
1990	Little Sir Nicholas	Mrs. Tremaine	Miniseries	
1990	Medics	Sarah	Episode: "Iraj"	
1990	May to December	Zelda	Episode: "I'll See You in My Dreams"	
1991	Bergerac	Anne-Claire Leighton	Episode: "The Dark Horse"	
1992	The Ruth Rendell Mysteries	Joanne	Episode: "Kissing the Gunner's Daughter: Part Two"	
1993	Screen Two	Annie	Episode: "Dead Romantic"	
1993	To Play the King	Princess Charlotte	Miniseries	
1994	A Dark Adapted Eye	Vranni	Miniseries	
1995	Little Lord Fauntleroy	Lady Fauntleroy	Miniseries	
1997	Family Money	Ella	Miniseries	
1997	The Rag Nymph	Bernice Crane-Bolder	Miniseries	
2002	Tipping the Velvet	Mrs. Denby	2 episodes	
2005	The Inspector Lynley Mysteries	Denning	Episode: "In the Guise of Death"	
2005	Casualty	Sofia Morelli	Episode: "That's Amore"	
2005	Sensitive Skin	Woman in Salon	Episode: "Episode 1.1"	
2013	Strike Back	Amma	2 episodes	
2013	Atlantis	Hestia	Episode: "Pandora's Box"	
2015	Undercover	Lucine	4 episodes	
2013	Doctors	Gloria Finegan	1 episode	
2017	Doctors	Queenie Markell	1 episode	
2018	Genius	Marie Cuttoli	Episode: "Picasso: Chapter Seven"	
2019	The Last Czars	Minnie	Miniseries	
2020	Doctors	Agnes Veigh	Series 21, Episode 124	

=== Video games ===
Year	Title	Role	Notes	Ref.
2006	Final Fantasy XII	Gerun	Voice role	

== Select stage credits ==
Year	Title	Role	Notes	Ref.
1975	The Only True Story of Lady Godiva	Fay		
1978	Homage to Neruda	Lady Basildon	Tamahnous Theatre Workshop, British Columbia	
2019	Torch Song	Ma	Turbine Theatre (West End)	
