= The Girl (1987 film) =

- Directed by: Arne Mattsson
- Written by: Ernest Hotch
- Produced by: Arne Mattsson
- Starring: Franco Nero; Claire Powney; Bernice Stegers; Frank Brennan; Mark Robinson; Clifford Rose; Lenore Zann; Christopher Lee; Derek Benfield
- Cinematography: Lars Karlsson; Goran Mecava; Tomislav Pinter
- Edited by: Derek Trigg
- Music by: Alfi Kabiljo
- Production company: Lux Film
- Distributed by: Shapiro Entertainment
- Release date: August 7, 1987
- Running time: 105 minutes
- Countries: United Kingdom; Sweden
- Language: English

The Girl is a 1987 British-Swedish drama film directed by Arne Mattsson and starring Franco Nero, Bernice Stegers and Christopher Lee.

== Plot ==
A middle-aged man becomes involved with a much younger girl, leading to a scandal.

== Cast ==
- Franco Nero as Johan (John) Berg
- Bernice Stegers as Eva Berg
- Clare Powney as Pat
- Frank Brennan as Lindberg
- Christopher Lee as Peter Storm
- Mark Robinson as Hans
- Derek Benfield as Janitor
- Clifford Rose as General Carlsson
- Rosie Jauckens as Fru Carlsson
- Lenore Zann as Viveka
- Heinz Hopf as David
- Mark Dowling as Silenski
- Pontus Platin as Sandberg
- Olle Björling as The Host
- Hanna Brogren as The Housekeeper
