= Cecilia Anne Jones =

- Born: 1832; St Helier
- Died: March 19, 1891 (aged 58–59); Bow
- Occupation: Writer

Cecilia Anne Jones (1832 – March 19, 1891) was a British writer.

Cecilia Anne Jones was born on 1832 in Saint Helier, Jersey. She was the daughter of George Matthew Jones (1805-1861), surgeon at Jersey General Hospital, and Jane Mary Rogers Jones.

Jones wrote dozens of works of fiction and religious non-fiction for children. Her Little Sir Nicholas (1890) was adapted into a 6 episode television series for BBC1 in 1990 starring Max Beazley as the young Nicholas Tremaine who is lost in a shipwreck and must reclaim his title and estate after he is presumed dead.

Cecilia Anne Jones died on 19 March 1891 in Bow, Devon, after falling from a train. An inquest found that she was epileptic and suffered a seizure which caused the fall.

== Bibliography ==
- My Christmas Home; an Old Man's Sketch. London, 1858.
- "Ready and Desirous"; or, a Lent's Lessons. London, 1858.
- St. John the Evangelist's Day; or, the Martyrdom of Will. London, 1859.
- The Snowdrop: An Old Woman's Story. 1 vol. London: Joseph Masters, 1860.
- Stories for Christmas-Tide. 1 vol. London: Joseph Masters, 1861.
- The Sunbeam: or, The Misused Gift. 1 vol. London: Joseph Masters, 1861.
- Gertrude Dacre. 1 vol. London: Joseph Masters, 1862.
- How Rachel Lee Found the Christmas Gift. 1867.
- Three Tales for an Idle Hour. 1 vol. London: John W. Parker, 1867.
- The Story of Hermione. 1 vol. London: John Hodges, 1868.
- Our Childhood's Pattern: Being Tales Based on the Incidents in the Life of the Holy Child Jesus. 1870.
- Our Childhood's Prayer; or, Our Father's Stories. Gosport, 1871.
- The Saints of Old; Being Short Sketches of the Holy-Days Found in the Kalendar of the English Church. London: J. T. Hayes, 1871.
- A New Dame Trot: A Story for Girls and Boys. London, 1872.
- A Little Life in a Great City. 1 vol. London: J. T. Hayes, 1873.
- What the Chimes Said. 1 vol. London: J. T. Hayes, 1873.
- Tales on the Parables. 1 vol. London: J. T. Hayes, 1874.
- Found after Many Days: A Story of the London Mission of 1874. 1 vol. London: A. R. Mowbray, 1875.
- Stories on the Church Festivals. London, 1875.
- My Sunday Friend: Bible Stories. 1876.
- Not Quite a Heroine. 1 vol. London: Joseph Masters, 1876.
- Poor Milly: A Tale of London Life. 1 vol. London: J. T. Hayes, 1876.
- Footprints of Our Fathers. London, 1876.
- The Foreign Freaks of Five Friends. 1 vol. London: Kegan Paul, 1882.
- Count up the Sunny Days: A Story for Boys and Girls. 1 vol. London: Wells, Gardner, Darton, 1882.
- Only a Girl: A Tale of Brittany. 1 vol. London: Wells, Gardner, Darton, 1883.
- Four Little Sixes: A Story for Boys and Girls. 1 vol. London: Wells, Gardner, Darton, 1883.
- Under the King's Banner: Stories of the Soldiers of Christ in All Ages. London, 1883.
- A New Dame Trot: A Story for Boys and Girls. 1 vol. London: Virtue, 1885.
- Little Captain Dick. 1 vol. London: Joseph Masters, 1885.
- Old Crumpet, the Shoemaker: A Tale of Two Missions. 1 vol. London: Joseph Masters, 1885.
- Little Jeanneton's Work: A Chronicle of Breton Life. 1 vol. London: Wells, Gardner, Darton, 1886.
- A Modern Red Riding Hood. 1 vol. London: Hatchards, 1889.
- Little Sir Nicholas: A Story for Children. London: 1890.
- Not Quite a Heroine. 1898.
