= Italian East Africa =

Italian territory in the Horn of Africa from 1936 to 1941

Coordinates: 9°2′48″N 38°45′28″E

Africa Orientale Italiana (Italian)
In native languages
- - شرق أفريقيا الإيطالية (Arabic)
  - Talyaaniga Bariga Afrika (Somali)
  - የጣሊያን ምሥራቅ አፍሪካ (Amharic)
  - Xaaliyaanii Baha Afrikaa (Oromo)
  - ኢጣልያ ምብራቕ ኣፍሪቃ (Tigrinya)
- 1936–1941
- Flag Coat of arms
- Motto: FERT (Motto for the House of Savoy)
- Anthem: Marcia Reale d'Ordinanza "Royal March of Ordinance"
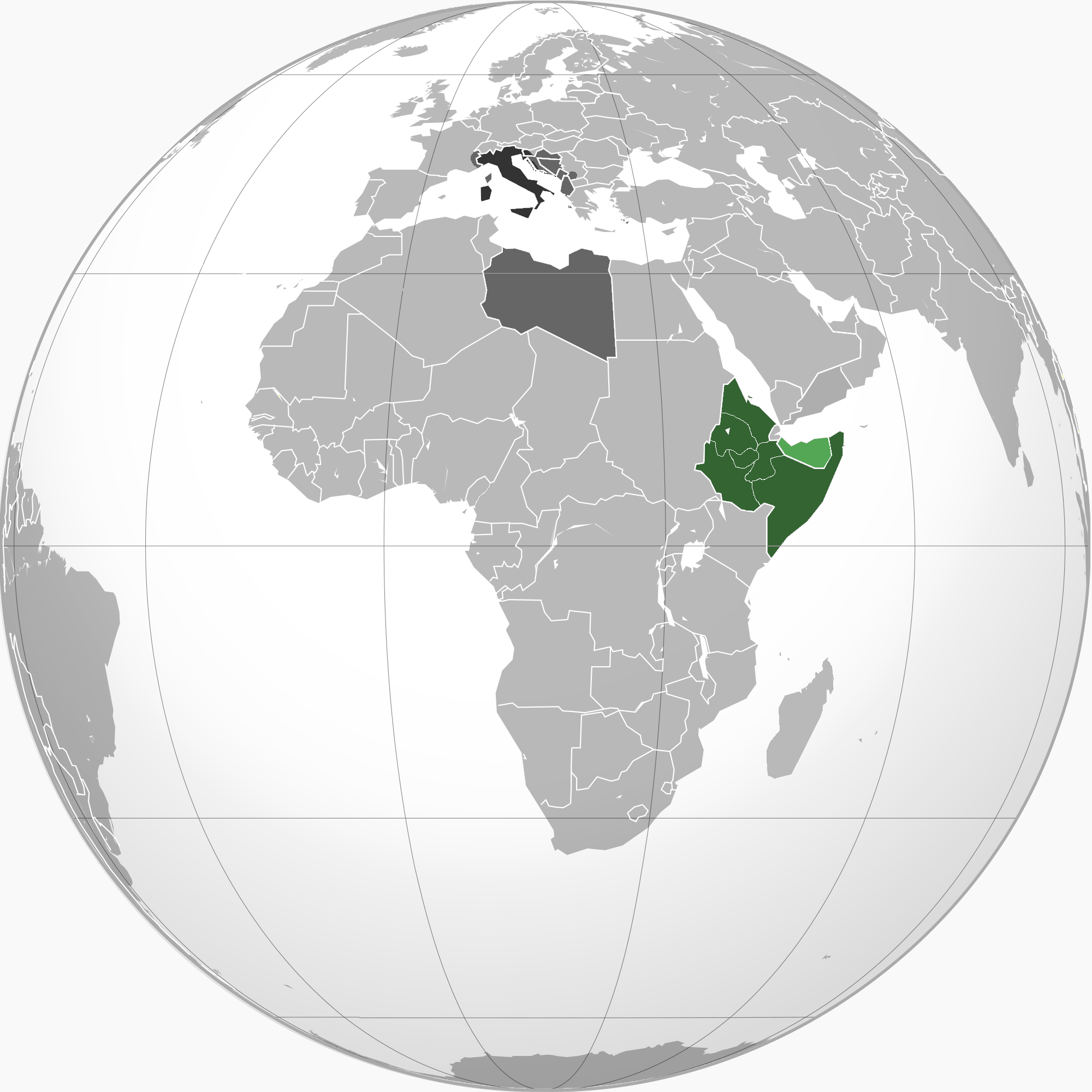
- Italian East Africa (1941): Italian East Africa in 1939 Occupied in 1940 Italian controlled territory Kingdom of Italy
- Capital: Addis Ababa
- Common languages: Italian (official), Arabic, Oromo, Amharic, Tigrinya, Somali, Tigre
- Religion: Roman Catholicism; Oriental Orthodoxy; Sunni Islam; Judaism
- Emperor
  - 1936–1941: Victor Emmanuel III
- Governor-General (Note: The full title was Viceroy of Ethiopia and Governor General of Italian East Africa.)
  - 1936: Pietro Badoglio
  - 1936–1937: Rodolfo Graziani
  - 1937–1941: Amedeo di Aosta
  - 1941 (acting): Pietro Gazzera
  - 1941 (acting): Guglielmo Nasi
- Historical era: Interwar period and World War II
  - Second Italo-Ethiopian War ends: 5 May 1936
  - Ethiopia formally annexed: 9 May 1936
  - Italian East Africa proclaimed: 1 June 1936
  - British Somaliland annexed: 19 August 1940
  - Allied occupation: 27 November 1941
  - Relinquished by Italy: 10 February 1947

Area
- 1939: 1,725,000 km^{2} (666,000 sq mi)

Population
  - 1939: 12,100,000
- Currency: Italian East African lira
Preceded by
1936: Ethiopian Empire
Italian Somaliland
Italian Eritrea
1936: Sultanate of Aussa
1940: British Somaliland
Succeeded by
Military Administration in Ethiopia
Military Administration in Somaliland
Military Administration in Eritrea
Military Administration in Ogaden
British Somaliland
- Today part of: Eritrea; Somalia; Ethiopia; Somaliland

Italian East Africa (Italian: Africa Orientale Italiana, A.O.I.) was a colonial administrative entity of the Kingdom of Italy in the Horn of Africa that existed from 1936 to 1941. It was proclaimed by Benito Mussolini on 1 June 1936, following the conquest and annexation of Ethiopia during the Second Italo-Ethiopian War. It encompassed Italian Somaliland, Italian Eritrea (both Italian possessions since 1880s) and the Ethiopian territories, all administered by a single administrative unit, the Governo Generale dell'Africa Orientale Italiana. The colony was divided into six governorates: Eritrea, Somalia, Harar, Galla-Sidamo, Amhara and Scioa.

The new colonial administration sought to consolidate Italian rule through infrastructure development, settlement policies, and administrative centralization. Urban planning projects, road construction, and public works were promoted as symbols of imperial modernization. Italian rule combined centralized authority with policies designed to weaken the former Ethiopian imperial structure. The administration reorganized territories along ethnic and regional lines, marginalized traditional elites associated with the Ethiopian state, and implemented legislation that formalized strict racial segregation between black Africans and Italians, comparable in scope and scale to those of South Africa during the Apartheid era.

The Italian administration undertook significant infrastructure projects, including road construction and urban redevelopment, particularly in Asmara, Mogadishu and Addis Ababa. However, economic development remained limited and heavily dependent on state support. Italian settlement was encouraged for strategic and political reasons, though large-scale agricultural colonization was constrained by demographic and logistical realities. By 1939, it was settled by about 165,270 Italian colonists. Despite efforts to pacify the territory, armed resistance by Ethiopian patriots (Arbegnoch) persisted throughout Italian rule.

During World War II, Italian East Africa was attacked by British forces during the East African campaign. After the battle of Gondar in November 1941, all former East African Italian territories came under British military administration thereafter (see British Administration in Ethiopia, British Military Administration in Somaliland, British Military Administration in Ogaden and Haud and British Military Administration in Eritrea). Emperor Haile Selassie was restored to the Ethiopian throne, and the country was governed under the Anglo-Ethiopian Agreement until full sovereignty was restored in 1944. In 1950, British occupied Somalia became the Trust Territory of Somaliland under Italian Administration until its independence in 1960. British occupied Eritrea became an autonomous part of Ethiopia in 1952. And the British occupied Ogaden was returned to Ethiopia in 1948, and Haud was returned in 1955.

== Background ==
=== Italian ambitions and rise of fascism ===
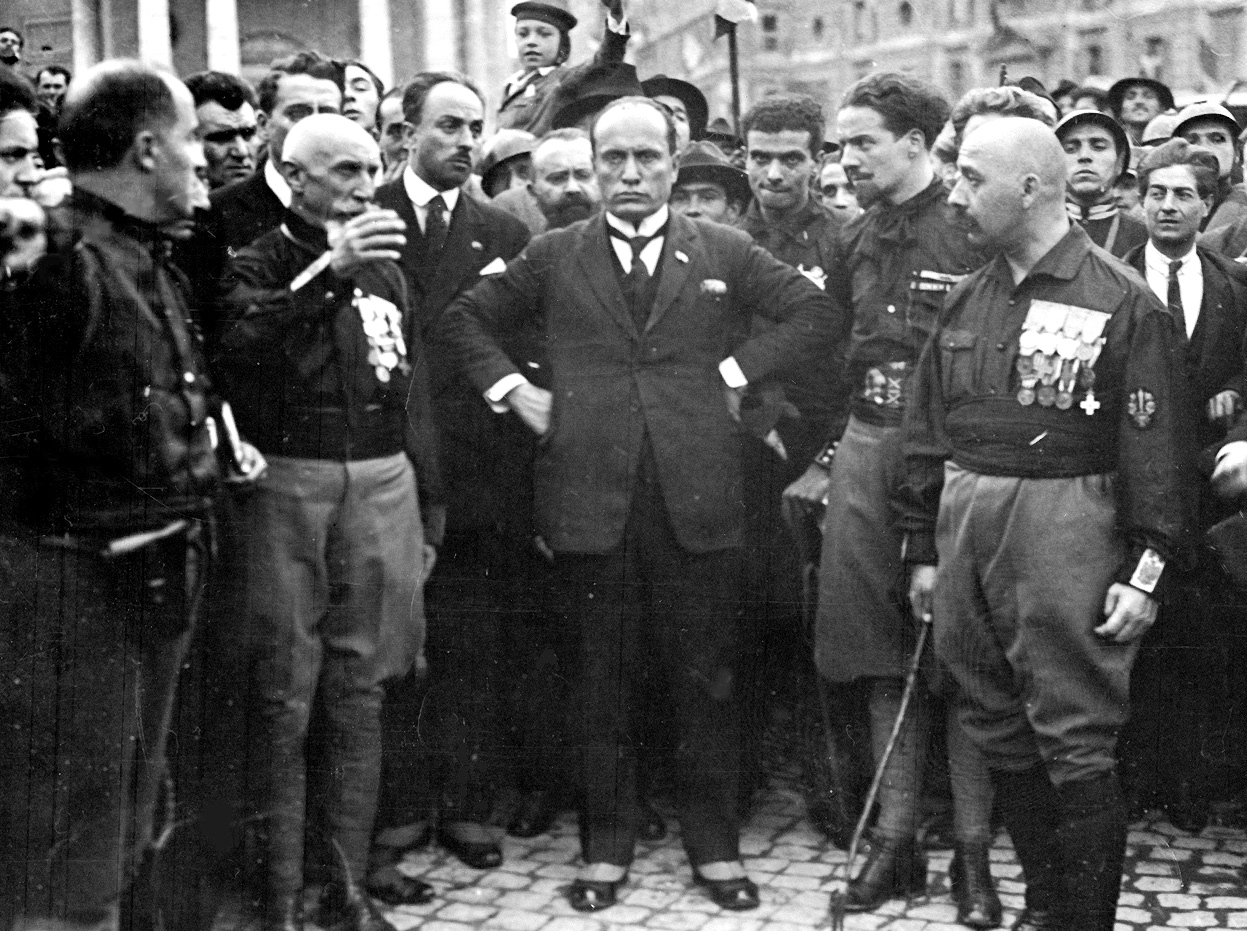
Mussolini and the fascist paramilitary Blackshirts' March on Rome in October 1922. Marshal De Bono, standing left of Mussolini, commanded Italian forces during the Second Italo-Ethiopian War.

In the late 19th and early 20th centuries, Italy sought to expand its colonial empire, competing with other European powers for overseas territories. Early efforts included the colonization of Eritrea (1890) and Italian Somaliland (1905), followed by the unsuccessful invasion of the Ethiopian Empire in the First Italo-Ethiopian War (1895–1896). After World War I, nationalist sentiments grew, fueled by the belief that Italy had been denied its rightful territorial rewards for its contribution to the war effort, a sentiment known as the Mutilated Victory (Italian: Vittoria Mutilata). The combination of mobilization costs and the social unrest that followed the war is widely thought to have strengthened Italian irredentism and nationalism. This frustration contributed to the rise of Benito Mussolini and his Fascist regime in 1922.

Mussolini injected a new and aggressive impetus into these frustrations and ambitions, framing colonial expansion as a means to restore Roman greatness, enhance national prestige, and solve Italy's economic problems by providing land and resources. Mussolini believed the Italian people lacked a strong nationalistic and colonial conscience and thus sought to cultivate these sentiments through Fascist propaganda, particularly in the lead-up to the invasion and during occupation of the Ethiopia Empire. This propaganda emphasized Italy's need for colonial territories (Italian: spazio vitale), the perceived danger of Ethiopian aggression, and the injustice of international opposition to Italian expansion. The conquest of Ethiopia in 1936 and the subsequent formation of Italian East Africa were presented as major achievements of the Fascist regime, aimed at fulfilling long-standing Italian ambitions and establishing Italy as a major power. Despite earlier consideration of a protectorate over parts of Ethiopia, the Fascist government pursued full conquest, driven by Mussolini's determination to achieve a significant colonial victory to bolster his regime's legitimacy and international standing.

=== Second Italo-Ethiopian War ===
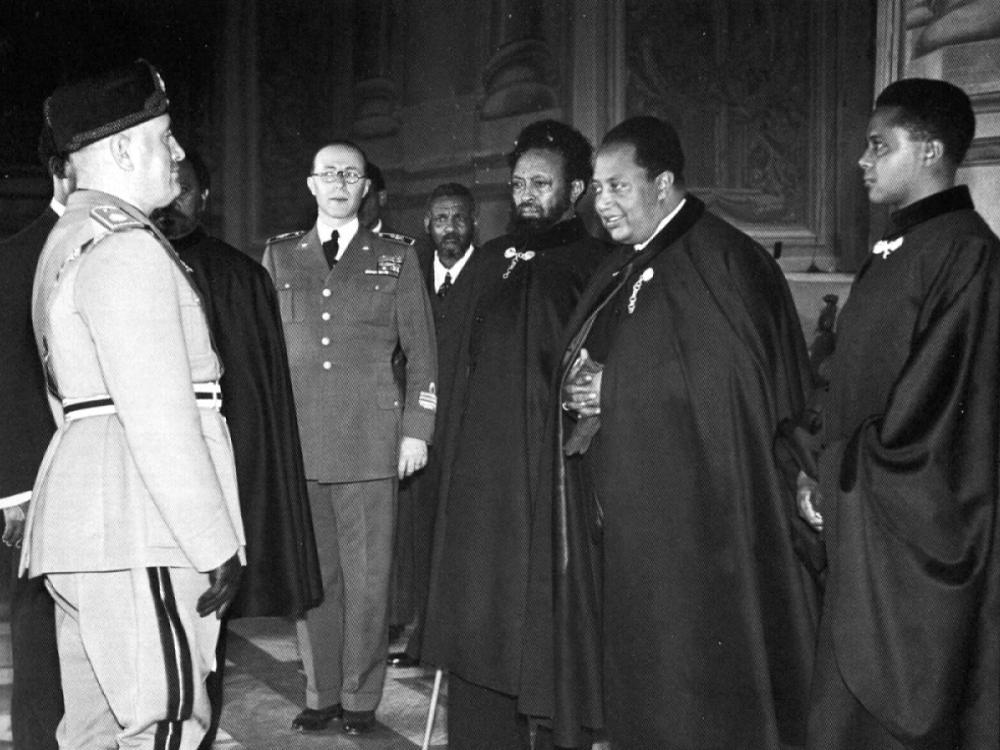
The Abyssinian leaders Ras Seyoum Mengesha, Ras Getachew Abate and Ras Kebede Gebre received in Rome by Benito Mussolini on 6 February 1937

The Italo-Ethiopian Treaty of 1928 stated that the border between Italian Somaliland and Ethiopia was 21 leagues parallel to the Benadir coast. In 1934, a border clash at Ual-Ual between Italian and Ethiopian forces during a boundary survey provided Mussolini with a pretext for a war. The Second Italo-Ethiopian War began without prior declaration of war in October 1935, with Italy sending a modern army of two hundred thousand soldiers commanded by Marshal Emilio De Bono and General Rodolfo Graziani (and later Pietro Badoglio). This army was equipped with superior weaponry, including an air force and tanks. Italian troops used mustard gas in aerial bombardments (in violation of the Geneva Protocol and Geneva Conventions) against combatants and civilians in an attempt to discourage the Ethiopian people from supporting the resistance, claiming these actions were in retaliation for alleged Ethiopian atrocities.

This military superiority over the Ethiopian army, combined with the initial Ethiopian strategy of engaging in frontal battles led to significant Italian victories. Emperor Haile Selassie was forced to flee to England, with Italian forces entering the capital city, Addis Ababa, on 5 May 1936. On 9 May 1936, Mussolini proclaimed the formation of the Italian Empire from the balcony of Palazzo Venezia to a crowd of 200,000 people. During the speech he stated "Ethiopia is Italian! Italian in fact, because it is occupied by our victorious armies. Italian by right, because with the sword of Rome civilization triumphs over barbarism, justice triumphs over cruel arbitrariness, and redemption from misery triumphs over millennia of slavery."

== Italian rule ==
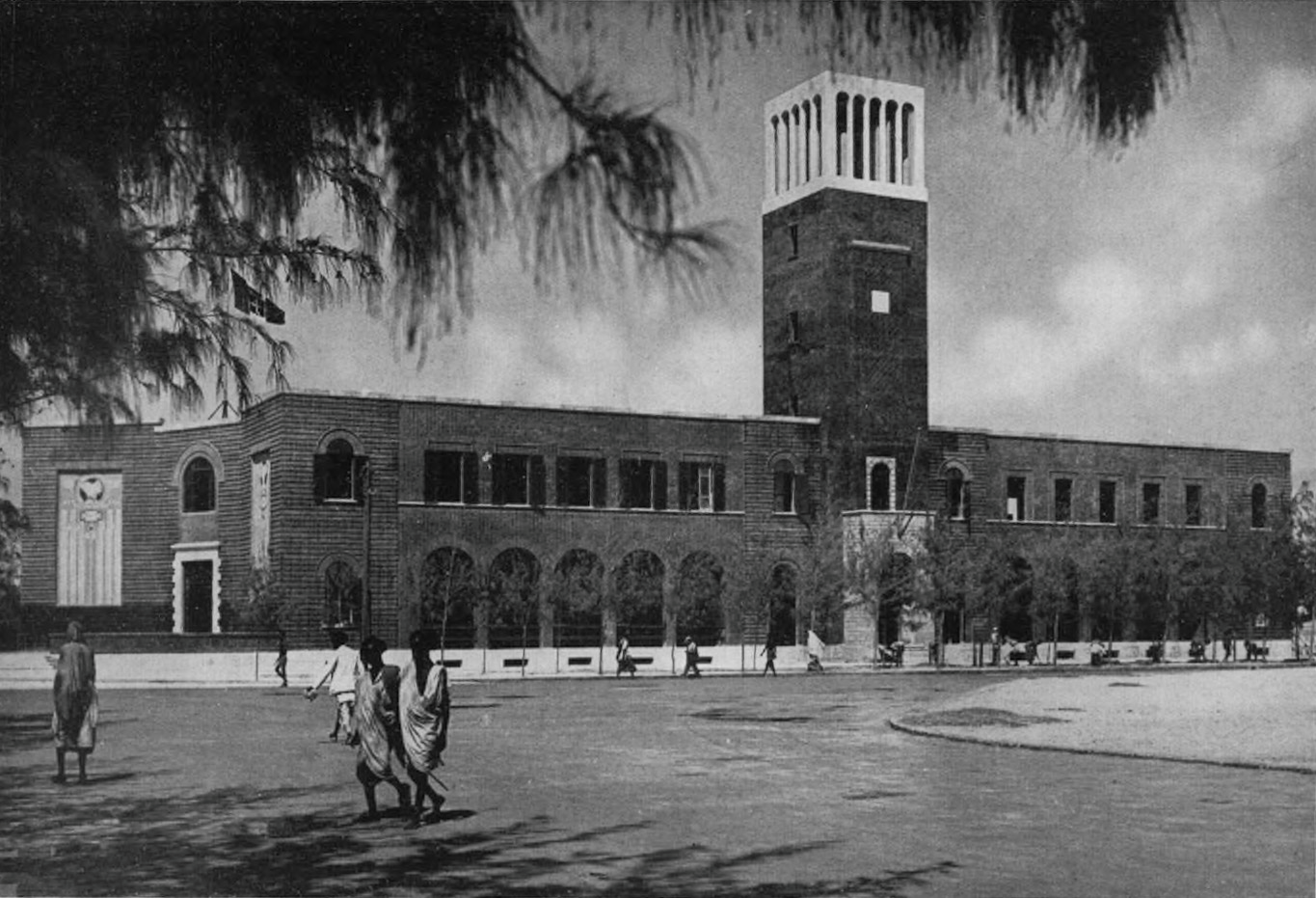
Casa del Fascio, the headquarters of the National Fascist Party in the Italian colonies, 1939.

The Fascist authorities immediately began organizing their new territories, and by a decree promulgated on 9 May 1936, King Victor Emmanuel III assumed the additional title of Emperor of Ethiopia. A decree dated 1 June 1936 unified the three territories of Ethiopia, Eritrea, and Somalia into a single legal and political entity designated Italian East Africa. From that point onward, although the name Ethiopia remained in the King of Italy’s imperial title, Ethiopia ceased to exist as an administrative unit. Gradually, in common usage, the term Italian East Africa took precedence over that of Ethiopia, even within the imperial title of the King of Italy. The League of Nations adopted an ambiguous and weak policy on the issue of Italian East Africa, ending the sanctions against Italy in July 1936, and leaving the matter of recognition to individual countries without taking a strong collective position; by November 1938, 47 countries (at the time the majority of sovereign states) recognized the new Imperial titulature of the Italian king.

With the conquest of Ethiopia, Italy achieved its principal colonial objective, one it had pursued tenaciously since the early days of Italian expansion into the Horn of Africa. The establishment of Italian East Africa brought considerable popularity to Mussolini and signaled a major success for Fascism, helping to offset some of the negative effects of the global economic depression. Italy was now presented with the opportunity to reshape the geopolitics and institutions of the Horn of Africa as a whole and to impose its vision on the populations living there.

Although Italy lacked the financial and technical resources to bring about a genuine transformation of the economy and society of Italian East Africa, Italian administrators, headquartered in Emperor Haile Selassie's former Palace, prepared to alter the very foundations of Ethiopia by manipulating the hierarchical balance among power elites and major ethnic groups or nations. Ethiopia as a unified entity was partitioned in order to eliminate its capacity to resist foreign domination. By dismantling the imperial infrastructure along regional or ethnic lines—and thereby breaking apart the state that Menelik II and Haile Selassie I had consolidated in the previous century—Italy sought to replace it with territorial units that were more nationally homogeneous.

=== Administration ===
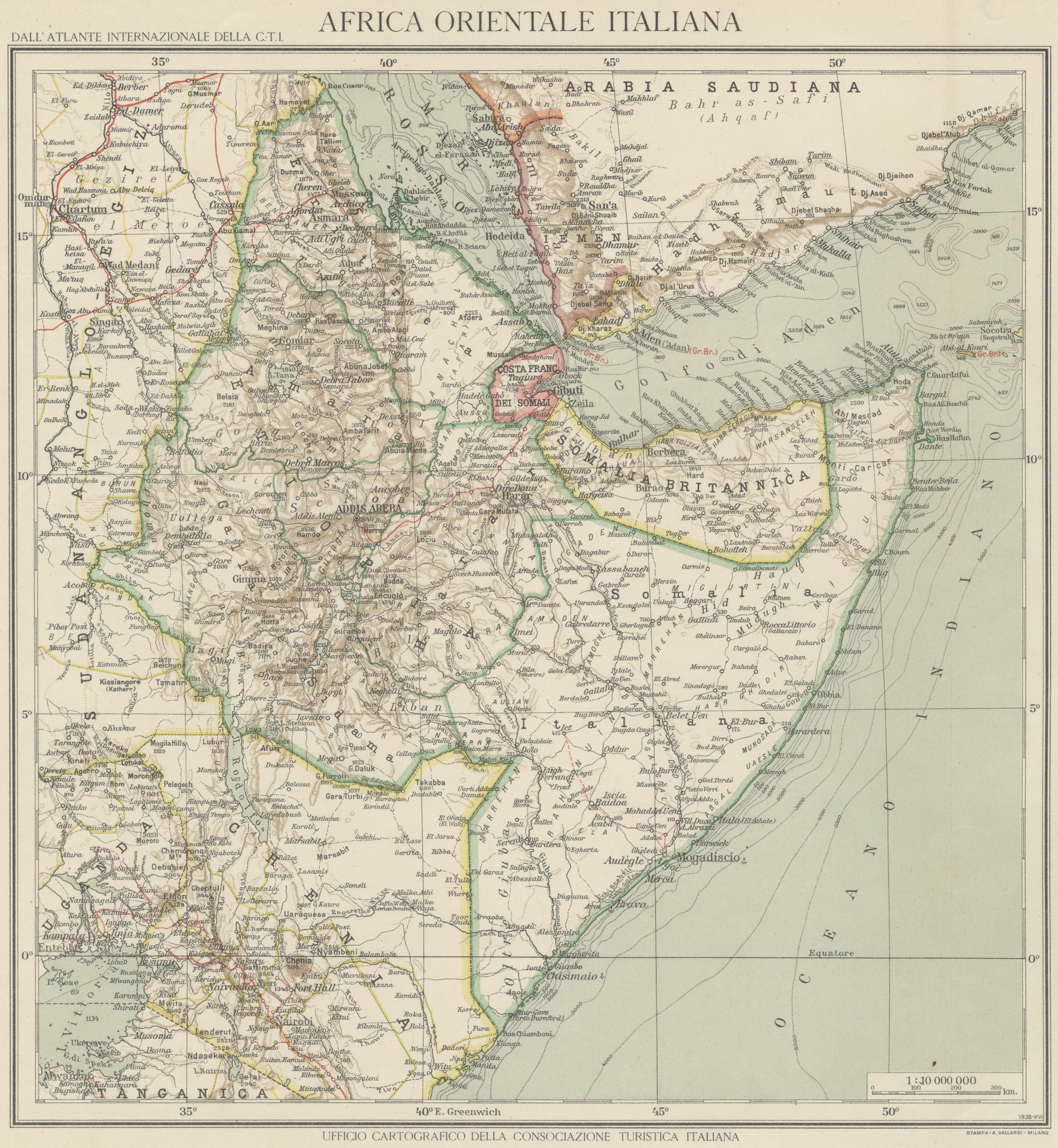
Map of the Administrative subdivisions of Italian East Africa, 1938

Italian East Africa was administered by a single administrative unit, the Governo Generale dell'AOI. (GGAOI), with the city of Addis Abeba as its capital. The colonial government was overseen by Ministry of Italian Africa (Italian: Ministro per l'Africa italiana) and was administered by a Viceroy of Ethiopia and Governor General of Italian East Africa, appointed by the Italian king. Victor Emmanuel III of Italy consequently adopted the title of "Emperor of Ethiopia". The dominion was further divided for administrative purposes into six governorates, further divided into forty commissariati.

Italian rule combined elements of centralized control with a "divide and conquer" strategy. The regime reorganized territories along ethnic and regional lines, marginalizing groups associated with the former Ethiopian imperial state, particularly the Amhara elite. The Oromo and Muslim communities were often treated more favorably in an effort to weaken the traditional power structures of Orthodox Christian Ethiopia. The administration categorized inhabitants as either "citizens" (Italians and other Europeans) or "subjects" (colonized populations). While colonial law nominally allowed the preservation of indigenous customs and religious freedom, racial legislation introduced in 1939 institutionalized discrimination and prohibited mixed marriages. The Italian government promoted Catholic missions and limited the influence of the Ethiopian Orthodox Tewahedo Church, while granting formal parity to Islam. Slavery, which Italian propaganda had emphasized as justification for the invasion, was officially abolished, though many former slaves remained in dependent conditions or were recruited for labor and military service.

==== Apartheid ====
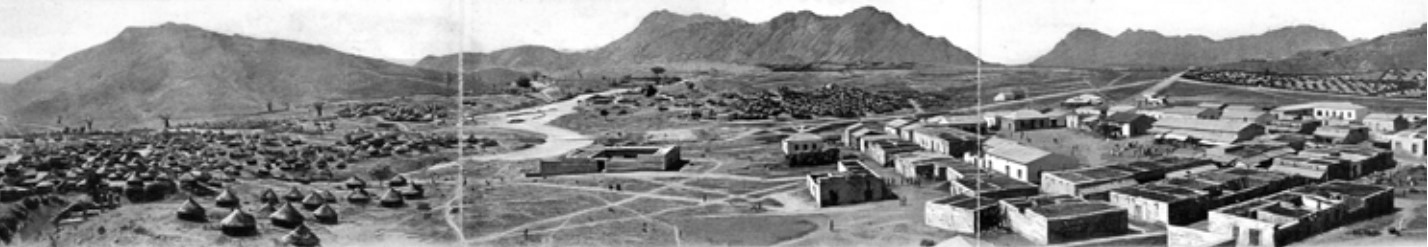
Panoramic view of the Eritrean town of Keren, showing the indigenous settlement on the left and the European one to the right.

From 1936 onward, Italian Fascism intensified the racial policies in its African colonies, introducing a system of organized segregation in Italian East Africa that went beyond earlier colonial practices and, in some respects, greatly resembled later apartheid structures in South Africa. Although segregation had already existed in Eritrea through racially divided residential zones, schools, hospitals, and public spaces—the annexation of Ethiopia and Mussolini's ambition to promote Italian settlement elevated the "race question" to a central political concern. Apartheid policy was first systematized by a directive that Colonial Minister Alessandro Lessona sent to Viceroy Rodolfo Graziani on 5 August 1936. In it, Graziani was instructed to make the "clear separation between the white and black races" the guiding principle of policy in Italian East Africa. In particular, any familiarity between the "two races" was to be avoided, and everyday contact was to be limited to the bare minimum. Influenced by Fascist anthropologists such as Lidio Cipriani who considered East Africans to be biologically inferior, the regime progressively radicalized its policies, first through administrative measures such as segregated urban planning and restrictions on interracial contact, and later through formal legislation. The 1937 colonial racial law criminalized madamismo (non-marital relationships between Italian men and African women), while subsequent laws institutionalized broader racial discrimination, reinforced notions of "racial prestige," and legally entrenched the separation of Italians and Africans in social, legal, and public life.

In 1938, Mussolini enacted The Italian Racial Laws (Italian: Leggi Razziali), which institutionalized racial discrimination against Italian Jews and African inhabitants of the Italian Empire. These laws, and later a policy of pacification by apartheid, enforced segregation and reinforced racial hierarchies in Italy's colonies, further aligning Italian fascism with Nazi ideology. Separate residential areas for whites and blacks were established in Asmara, Addis Ababa, Mogadishu, Harar, Jimma, Gondar, and Massawa. Race-segregated schools, hospitals, restaurants, bars, shops and cinemas were established; any native could be prosecuted for frequenting a place reserved for Europeans. Black children could not receive the same education as those from white civil servant or settler families. The duration of schooling was limited to three years. On trains, black passengers were only allowed in the rear section; the front was reserved for whites. Interracial marriage was prohibited, and so was having children between those of different races. Those who were mixed-race could not get Italian citizenship or go to schools meant for Italians. Married Italian colonists had to bring their families, and those who were unmarried could not employ servants. The second colonial racial law of June 1939 established a fully institutionalized system of segregation. Introduced by Benito Mussolini and signed by the Italian king, apartheid was formally codified under the title "Punishment Measures for the Protection of the Racial Prestige of the Indigenous Peoples of Italian East Africa." This legislation, valid throughout the Kingdom of Italy and its colonies, extended protection to protect the "Italian racial prestige". Public offices set up separate counters, as it was considered detrimental to "racial prestige" for an Italian to have to join a queue with Africans and wait like everyone else.

==== Territory ====
When established in 1936, Italian East Africa consisted of the old Italian possessions in the Horn of Africa: Italian Eritrea and Italian Somaliland, combined with the recently conquered Empire of Ethiopia. The territory was divided into the six governorates: Eritrea and Somalia, consisting of the respective former colonies, enlarged with territory from Ethiopia. Eritrea was expanded to include part of the Tigrayan highlands and the territory inhabited by the Afar in the lowlands. Somalia absorbed the Ogaden and other areas inhabited by Somalis. The remainder of "Italian Ethiopia" consisted of the Harar, Galla-Sidamo, Amhara, and Addis Abeba Governorates. The Addis Abeba Governorate was enlarged into the Scioa Governorate with territory from neighboring Harar, Galla-Sidamo and Amhara in November 1938.

English	Capital	Total population	Italians	Tag	Coat of Arms
Amhara Governorate	Gondar	2,000,000	11,103	AM	
Eritrea Governorate	Asmara	1,500,000	72,408	ER	
Galla-Sidamo Governorate	Jimma	4,000,000	11,823	GS	
Harar Governorate	Harar	1,600,000	10,035	HA	
Scioa Governorate	Addis Ababa	1,850,000	40,698	SC	
Somalia Governorate	Mogadishu	1,150,000	19,200	SOM	

=== Economic development ===
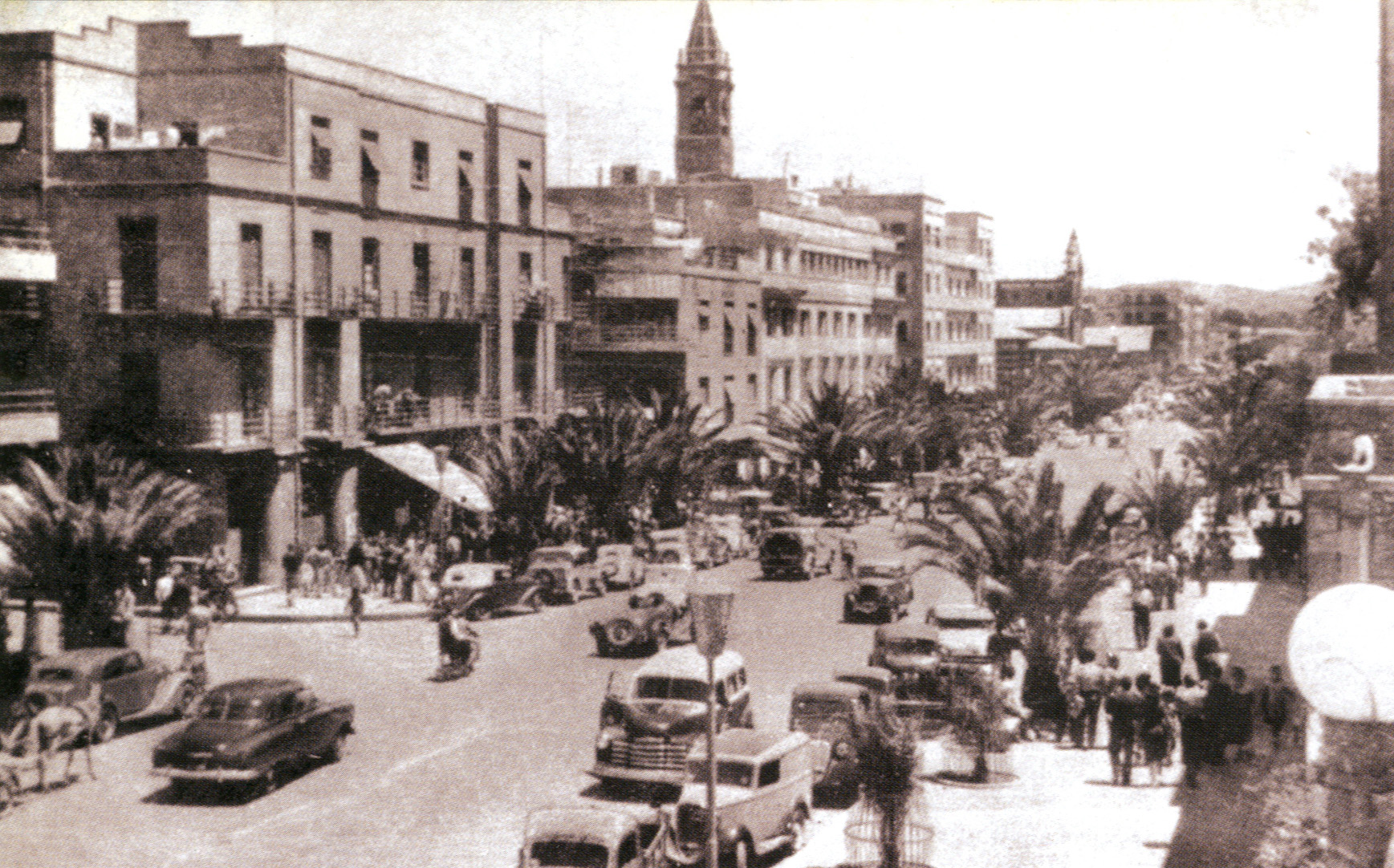
Mussolini Avenue in Asmara, 1938

Italy's Fascist regime encouraged Italian peasants to colonize Ethiopia by setting up farms and small manufacturing businesses. However, few Italians came to the Ethiopian colony, with most going to Eritrea and Somalia. While Italian Eritrea enjoyed some degree of development, supported by nearly 80,000 Italian colonists, by 1940 only 3,200 farmers had arrived in Ethiopia, less than ten percent of the Fascist regime's goal. Continued insurgency by native Ethiopians, lack of natural resources, rough terrain, and uncertainty of political and military conditions discouraged development and settlement in the countryside.

==== Transportation and public works ====
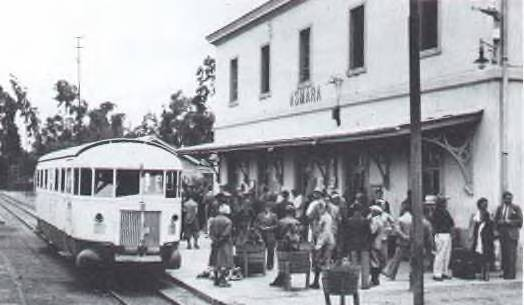
Asmara station on the Eritrean Railway in 1938, with passengers boarding a Littorina

The Italians made a significant effort to build roads in the territory; most of the money given to the territory by the government for "civilian works" between 1937 and 1941 was for building roads. The number of laborers numbered in the thousands and were recruited from Italy, Ethiopia, Sudan and Yemen; though the most demanding work was left to laborers who were not Italian. It was reported that "at the height of construction, nearly 64,000 Italians relocated to the AOI to build roads". Italians constructed a road between Addis Ababa and Massawa, Addis Ababa and Mogadishu, and Addis Ababa to Assab. Public companies were established in Ethiopian governorates, such as the Ethiopian Electricity Company (Italian: Imprese elettriche d'Etiopia).

Italians built additional airports and in 1936 started the Linea dell'Impero, a flight connecting Addis Ababa to Rome. The line was opened after the Italian conquest of Ethiopia and was followed by the first air links with the AOI governorates. The route was enlarged to 6,379 km, and initially joined Rome with Addis Ababa via Syracuse, Benghazi, Cairo, Wadi Halfa, Khartoum, Kassala, Asmara, and Dire Dawa.

900 km of railway was reconstructed or initiated (such as the railway between Addis Ababa and Assab). The Djibouti–Addis Ababa Railway, the most significant railway in Italian East Africa, was acquired following the Italian conquest of Ethiopia in 1936. Until 1935, steam trains operated the 784 km route, taking about 36 hours to travel between Addis Ababa and Djibouti. In 1938, Italy introduced four high-capacity "Type 038" rail-cars, derived from the Fiat ALn56 model, increasing speeds to 70 km/h and reducing travel time to 18 hours. These diesel railcars remained in use until the mid-1960s. Major stations offered bus connections to other cities in Italian East Africa, and a fire brigade unit was established near Addis Ababa station—the only one of its kind in Africa at the time.

Italians invested substantively in Ethiopian infrastructure development. However, Ethiopia and Italian East Africa proved to be extremely expensive to maintain, as the budget for the fiscal year 1936–37 had been set at 19.136 billion lira to create the necessary infrastructure for the colony. At the time, Italy's entire yearly revenue was only 18.581 billion lira.

With the decision to create a port in Assab, the Ethiopian hinterland was divided into approximate zones connected to the various ports, based on the criterion of shortest distance, meaning a saving in time and money for transportation. Studies were intensified for the construction of a large ocean port on the Somali coast, and it was decided to renovate the smaller ports to meet the needs arising from the new economic activities emerging in some regions. Once the works begun, planned, and still under consideration were completed, the empire would have ports at Massawa, Assab, Mogadishu, Merca, and Kismayo, in addition to the adequately equipped ports of Bender Cassim, Hafun, and Barawa.

The port of Massawa was considered the largest and safest in the Red Sea, and with the works completed in the period following the Ethiopian conflict, it had assumed a role of primary importance, managing to handle a traffic second only to that of Genoa and Naples. With the expansion, it was possible to dock and unload 15 steamships simultaneously. On January 21, 1938, work began on the construction of the large port of Assab, which would handle traffic from Aussa, Danakil, Shoa, and some of its neighboring areas. The entry into operation of the Danakil Highway and the port, albeit still limited, reduced Djibouti's commercial traffic, and in 1940 the Ministry of Italian Africa issued specific provisions, according to which a whole series of goods were sent to Assab. As regards to maritime transport, Lloyd Triestino operated the largest number of subsidised regular lines between the mother country and the empire, supported by smaller companies such as Achille Lauro of Naples, the Garibaldi Cooperative of Genoa and the Royal Banana Monopoly. Numerous lines were established between Italian ports and those of the empire, including the weekly Naples-Djibouti connections, the fortnightly Genoa-Kishimayo, the monthly Genoa-Djibouti, Genoa-Mogadishu, Trieste-Mogadishu. These last two then continued on to India. Many others were added to these, such as the Italy-South Africa service with ports of call at Massawa, Assab, Djibouti, Mogadishu, Merca and Kismayo and the express services from Genoa and Trieste to India and the Far East.

Air services were used by a limited clientele of entrepreneurs, merchants, and high-ranking military and civilian officials. For many others, moreover, the Ala Littoria represented the rapid means of postal delivery. The news that arrived by air had the incalculable advantage of speed over others: five days initially, later reduced to less than three, compared to the three or four weeks of ordinary mail. Not only travelers, not only news, but also medicines and anything urgent. Air transport, despite its rapid expansion, was still too expensive, reserved only for high-value goods, provided they were light and compact. On its way to East Africa, the Ala Littoria made one of its stops in Benghazi. From there, in about 36 hours, it reached Asmara, via Cairo and Wadi Halfa, from where, with a final leap, it arrived in Addis Ababa. From the four days it took in 1938, on a route of 5,634 km, the journey had decreased, by 1 January 1939, to only two and a half days, eliminating, after the stopover in Khartoum, every other stop and heading directly to the capital of the empire. Internal air services were also developed and airports were built not only in the government capitals, but also in Dire Dawa, Assab and in places without land connections. From October 1938, the Ala Littoria was supported by the Aviotrasporti company.

==== Agriculture ====
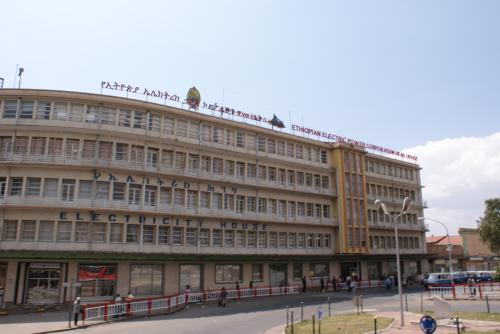
The Italian-era Ethiopian electric power corporation building, Addis Ababa

Farming was encouraged, particularly in Ethiopia, for settlement purposes. Among these agricultural settlements were Teseney, Villaggio Duca degli Abruzzi and Genale, while in the mining field there was the large salt mines of Hafun in Migiurtinia, considered at the time the largest in the world. Most of Italian East Africa's exports were bananas and pineapples. While most of Italy's exports to Italian East Africa were food products consisting of: "wheat flour and semolina, pasta, salt, sugar, cheese, cured meats, canned vegetables and meat, olive oil, wine, spirits, and mineral water". Farming was not as successful as anticipated by the Italians in Ethiopia due to factors such as having poor relations with native Ethiopians and having goals that were "too ambitious to fulfill". A sharecropping system was encouraged in Ethiopia by the Italian colonial authorities. The final wheat harvest in 1940 was bad due to a grasshopper plague and a fungus outbreak. Efforts were made to increase existing cotton production in Ethiopia which prior to the arrival of the Italians in Ethiopia was done at a small scale.

=== Education ===
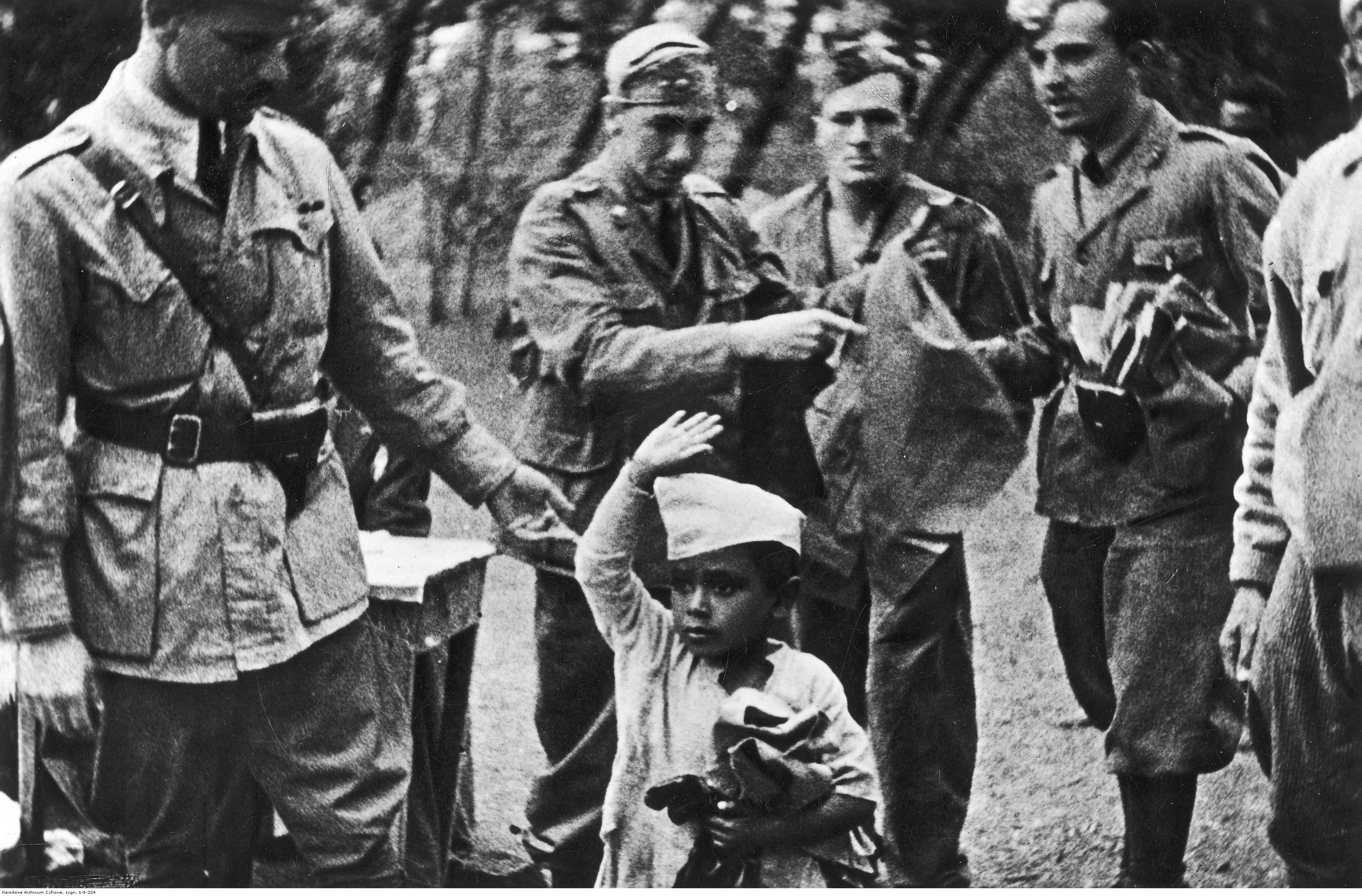
An Ethiopian boy surrounded by Italian soldiers showing the fascist salute, 1939

Prior to Fascism, education in Italian Somaliland and Italian Eritrea had primarily been the responsibility of both Roman Catholic and Protestant missionaries. With Mussolini's rise to power, government schools were created which eventually incorporated the Catholic missionaries' educational programmes while those of the Protestant missionaries became marginalised and circumscribed. Andrea Festa, who was made director of the central office governing primary education in Eritrea in November 1932, declared in 1934 that Fascist efforts in education needed to ensure that native Africans were "acquainted with a little of our civilisation" and that they needed to "know Italy, its glories, and ancient history, in order to, become a conscious militia man in the shade of our flag." Such education initiatives were designed to train Africans in a variety of practical tasks useful to the Fascist regime as well as to indoctrinate them with the tenets and lifestyle of Fascist ideology with the aim of creating citizens obedient and subservient to the state.

The propagandistic nature of the education was especially apparent in history textbooks issued to African children, which entirely omitted any discussion of events such as Italian disunity, Giuseppe Mazzini's "Young Italy" movement, the revolutions of 1848, or Giuseppe Garibaldi's Expedition of the Thousand and instead stressed the "glories" of the Roman Empire and those of the Italian state that claimed to be its successor. Glorification and lionisation of Mussolini and his "great work" likewise pervaded them, while periods during which Libya and other then-Italian possessions had been controlled by older, non-Italian empires, such as the Ottoman Empire, were portrayed through an unflattering lens. Use of the Fascist salute was mandatory in schools for African children, who were constantly encouraged to become "little soldiers of the Duce", and every day there was morning ceremony at which the Italian flag was hoisted and patriotic songs were sung. Italian children, whose education the Fascist government prioritised over that of Africans, received education similar to that in Fascist Italy's metropole, though with some aspects of it tailored to the local situation in East Africa. Fascist education in the colony proved to be a failure in the end, with only one twentieth of Italian colonial soldiers possessing any literacy.

In Italian East Africa, Fascist Italy sought to neutralize any educational institutions which provided instruction to Africans beyond the level expected by Fascist ideology. In particular the secondary education network in the Ethiopian Empire had prepared and enabled a relatively small but significant amount of Ethiopians to study abroad at universities in Europe. As a result of this policy and state-sponsored mass murder, post-World War II Ethiopia found itself impoverished of skilled workers due to the very limited and propagandistic education provided to its non-Italian inhabitants under Mussolini's rule. During World War II, few African natives displayed any loyalty to the Fascist state that the state's schools had so fervently tried to instill.

=== Banknotes and postage stamps ===
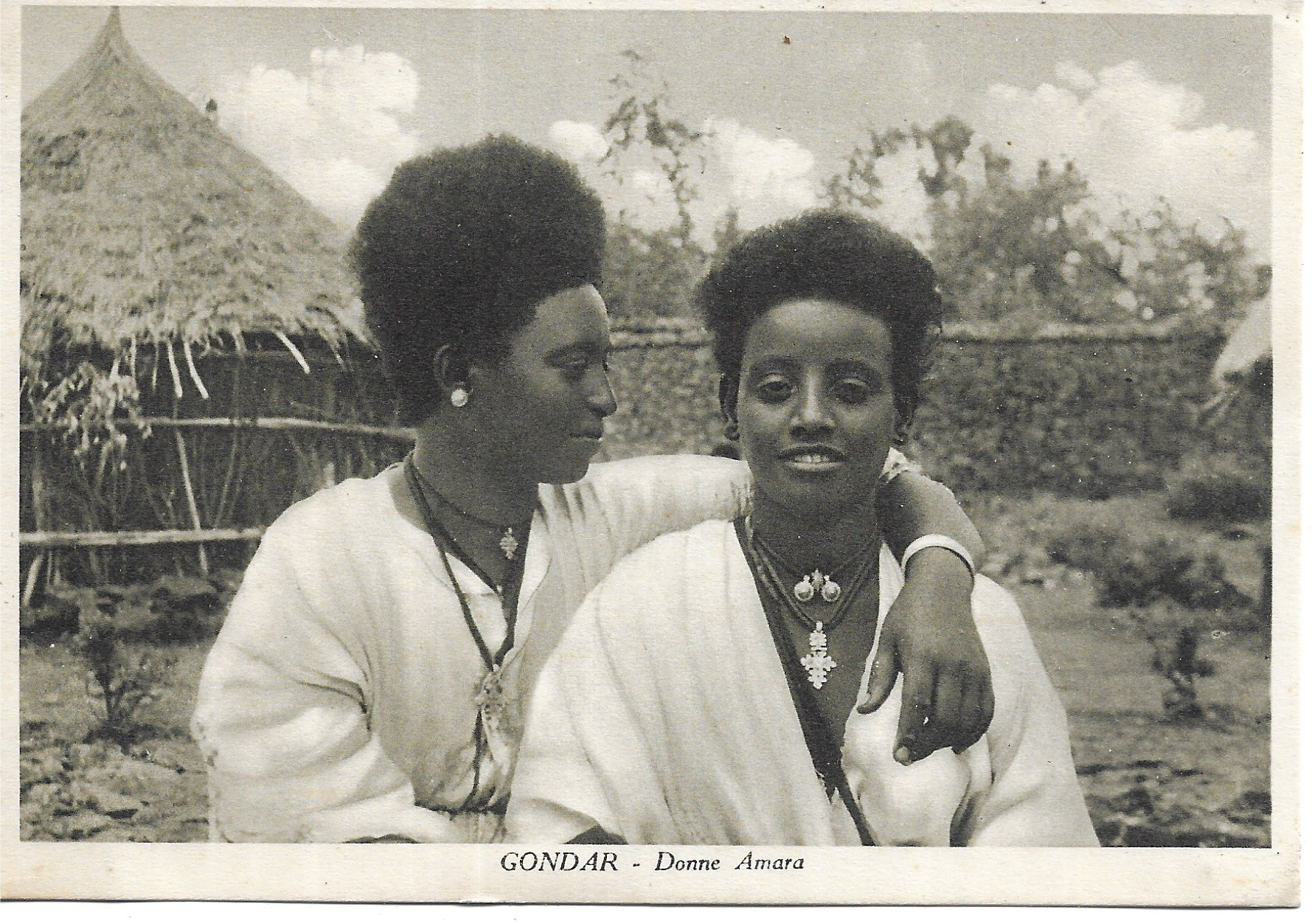
Italian postcard of Ethiopian women in Gondar, 1938

On 5 May 1936 the capital Addis Ababa was captured by the Italians: on 22 May three new stamps showing the King of Italy were issued. Four further values inscribed "ETIOPIA" were issued on 5 December 1936. After that date, the stamps were issued with the name "Africa Orientale Italiana" on it.

The Italian East African lira, abbreviated to £AOI, was the currency (law no. 260 of 11/01/1937) of the area between 1936 and 1941, and was equivalent to the Italian lira and circulated alongside it at the same exchange rate. The first banknotes were printed in 1938, with values of 50, 100, 500 and 1,000 lire. The Maria Theresa Thaler was also in circulation in the colony.

=== Demographics ===
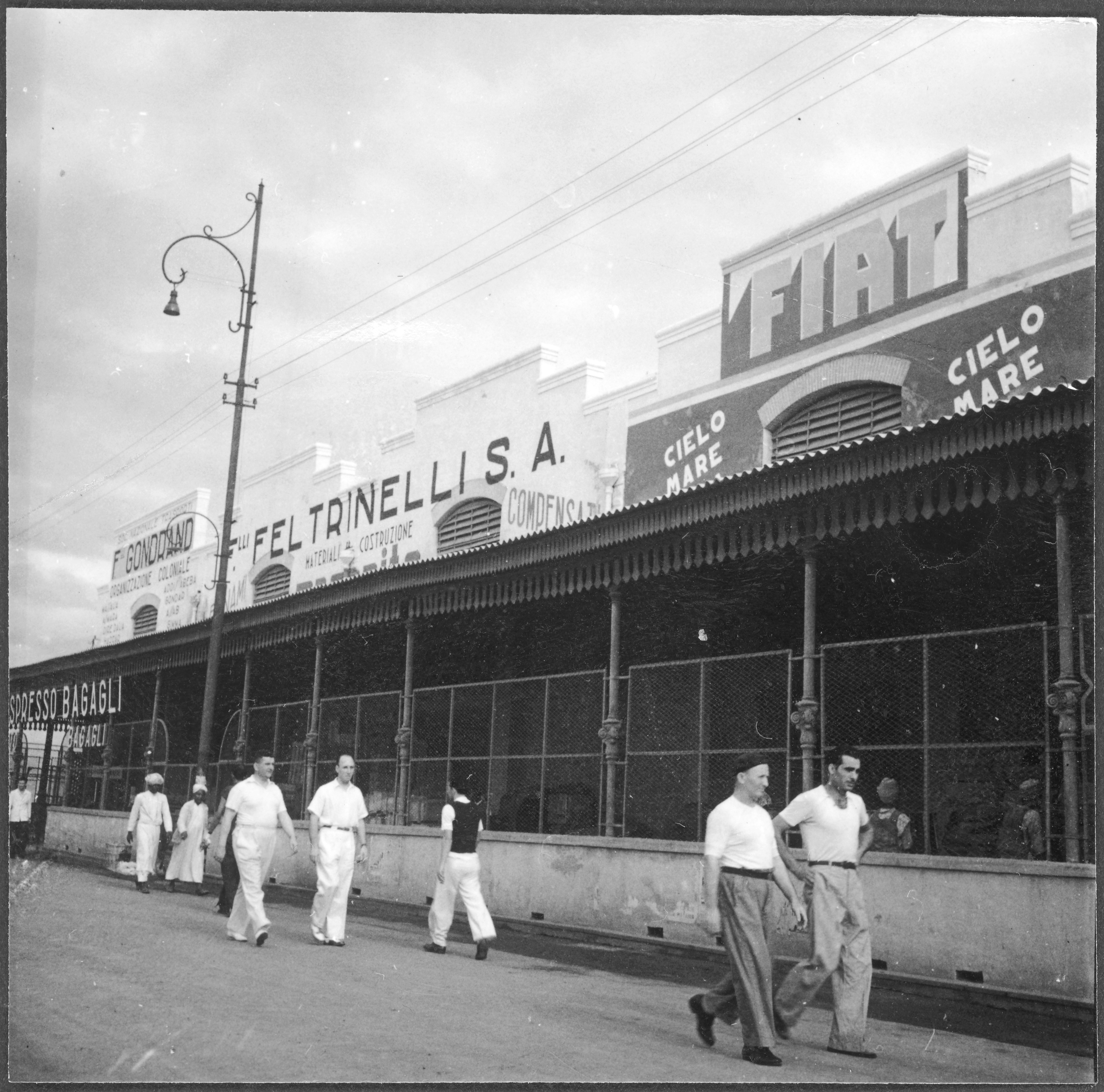
Italian settlers and commercial buildings in Massawa

In 1939 the total population was estimated at 12.1 million, with an uneven distribution across the region. Eritrea had around 1.5 million people in 90,000 square miles (16.7 people per square mile), Ethiopia had 9.5 million people in 305,000 square miles (31 people per square mile), and Italian Somaliland had 1.1 million people in 271,000 square miles (4 people per square mile). In Italian East Africa in March 1940 there were approximately 170,000 Italian civilians (on 31 December 1939 there were 165,267, but the flow continued until Italy's entry into the war), a notable number compared to the 6,000 (4,188 in Eritrea, 1,668 in Somalia, and just over one hundred in Ethiopia) present before the aggression against Ethiopia in 1935, also taking into account the short period of just four years during which the emigration took place. They lived largely in the capitals of the six governments that made up the empire and in the most important centres such as Dessie, Dire Dawa, Dekemhare, Massawa, and Keren, except for some government officials in the outlying residences and the peasants in the agricultural settlements. In Addis Ababa, on the eve of Italy's entry into the war, the Italian residents numbered 38,486, exceeded only by the 53,000 in Asmara. They belonged to every social class and professional category: public officials, entrepreneurs, artisans, traders, employees, workers, and farmers.

The presence of Italian women was modest in the first two years, limited to close relatives of imperial officials and members of the military. Then, starting in mid-1938, with the increasing construction of essential infrastructure such as roads, housing (many of which were built by public bodies including the Istituto Case Popolari, National Institute for Social Security, and the Bank of Italy), aqueducts, power plants, schools, and healthcare facilities, the increase became significant. Emigration was also encouraged by the Fascist regime to counter the phenomenon of madamism, which was widespread among all social classes despite the severe penalties imposed by the racial laws. Thus, many unmarried women also came to the empire in search of work or professional advancement in healthcare, teaching, and public and private employment. In March 1940, the female population numbered approximately 28,000, about 12,000 in Asmara and 6,300 in the capital. In the final period, female emigration represented 37% of the total. The social stratification can be compared to a triangle, with representatives of the upper middle class and the institutional, political, and military aristocracy—composed of the close relatives (wives, mothers, daughters) of imperial leaders—at the top; women of the peasant and working classes in the centre; and, at the base, the most numerous group, consisting of the middle and lower middle classes.

=== Archaeology ===
Archaeological activity in Italian East Africa began in 1938 with Ugo Monneret de Villard's study of the obelisks of Axum, after which he focused on the rock churches of Lalibela in Lasta, including the monolithic structures attributed to Gebre Meskel Lalibela. In 1939, Gaspare Oliviero conducted excavations around Adulis, while Ettore Rossi explored the Dahlak Islands, which had been the center of a thriving Muslim sultanate in the 12th and 13th centuries. Additionally, the restoration of the imperial palaces of Gondar was commissioned by Prince Amedeo, Duke of Aosta and completed right before the British occupation. In 1940, a special archaeological ordinance was issued establishing a superintendency in Addis Ababa to protect the artistic, bibliographical, and numismatic heritage of the region.

== Guerrilla war ==
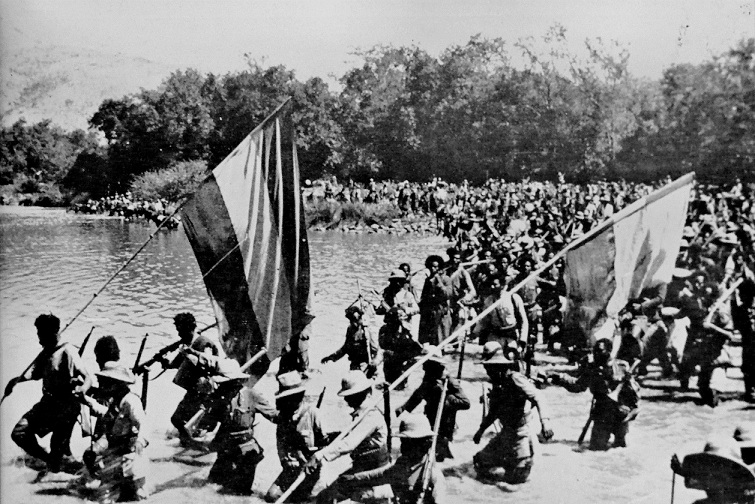
Ethiopian guerrillas crossing the Omo River, 1941.

Since no official act of surrender was ever signed, the official conclusion of the war and the proclamation of the Empire did not mark the end of military operations or pacification. After the conquest of Addis Ababa, Marshal Rodolfo Graziani found himself practically besieged inside the city during the rainy season by the guerrillas of Shewa. On 26 June, an aerial reconnaissance mission sent by Graziani to parlay with a local chief was slaughtered during the Lechemti massacre. The resumption of operations in the autumn was characterised by fierce fighting in Shewa itself, in south-western Ethiopia, and in Harar; the surviving Ethiopian units put up strong resistance, and prolonged operations by the Italian African Police were necessary to secure control over much of the territory. Italian forces resorted to brutal methods of repression, including mass shootings, reprisals for rebel attacks, destruction of villages, use of aviation, and once again gas. Mussolini himself preferred brute force to magnanimity, urging officers in the field to adopt a systematic policy of terror and extermination.

In the spring of 1937, a new general rebellion broke out among the Arbegnoch guerrilla groups who, led by able and energetic leaders such as Abebe Aregai, Hailu Kebede, Belay Zeleke, and Mengesha Jembere, placed the Italian garrisons in great difficulty. The Italian army mainly employed colonial units of Eritrean Ascari—devoted, resilient, and highly mobile soldiers—for roundup and repression operations. These troops were constantly at the centre of the so-called colonial police operations, which consisted essentially of brutal roundups and looting, always ordered and directed by Italian commanders. Irregular bands were also employed, organised for limited periods and specific tasks. These formations, often poorly disciplined and unreliable, were sent on reconnaissance ahead of the Ascari units.

In November 1937, Graziani learned from Mussolini that he would soon be replaced by the Prince Amedeo, Duke of Aosta. From his arrival in the colony, the latter did his utmost to begin a new phase of government. The viceroy knew that the cuts in expenditure demanded by Rome would not allow him to continue Graziani's harsh repression, which he intended to halt immediately because he considered it ineffective. Furthermore, the economy was far from as flourishing as regime propaganda claimed. Although Italy had not yet economically abandoned the empire throughout 1937, the duke faced a difficult pacification with limited resources and manpower. Executions were replaced by trials, the Danane concentration camp was gradually dismantled, and the majority of Ethiopian notables deported to Italy were brought back in an attempt to restore influence to local leaders more willing to submit. Amedeo, however, had limited scope to interpret the directives coming from Rome, especially those related to racial legislation, on which Mussolini remained inflexible. The viceroy also had to contend with influential figures, including the governor of Scioa and vice governor-general Enrico Cerulli, General Ugo Cavallero, head of the forces deployed in Italian East Africa, and the Minister of Italian Africa, Attilio Teruzzi, who opposed any policy aimed at strengthening local leaders.

Despite the promising beginnings of the new viceroy's administration, the resistance of the Arbegnoch did not subside, and despite their efforts, the Italians never truly succeeded in defeating it. From 1939 onwards, the British and French supported the resistance with weapons and resources to the extent that, by 1940, the majority of Italian forces in East Africa were engaged in containing guerrilla warfare within the empire. In this context, the Duke of Aosta decided to renounce the large-scale colonial police operations that had characterised the first years of domination. Neither side was able to overwhelm the other: the Italians controlled the cities and the main communication routes, while the guerrillas dominated the mountains and much of the countryside. With the outbreak of the Second World War, the situation evolved decisively to the disadvantage of the Italians, who paid the price for having relied almost exclusively on force throughout the occupation.

=== Atrocities ===
==== Yekatit 12 ====
On 19 February 1937, to celebrate the birth of the Prince of Naples, Rodolfo Graziani announced he would personally distribute alms to the poor at the Genete Leul Palace (also known as the Little Gebbi). Two young Eritreans living in Ethiopia named Abraha Deboch and Mogus Asgedom made an attempt on Graziani's life by throwing grenades. Following the attempt, Italian soldiers raided the Debre Libanos monastery, where the assassins were believed to have taken refuge, and executed hundreds of the monks and nuns. Italian forces, mostly Blackshirts, then continued to carry out brutal reprisals in Addis Ababa. Over the next three days, thousands of Ethiopian civilians were massacred: estimates range from 1,400 to 19,000 deaths, while Ethiopians claimed 30,000 victims. Italian troops, Blackshirt militias, and Fascist supporters set fire to homes, businesses, and churches, killing indiscriminately. The massacre has come to be known as Yekatit 12 (the date in the Ethiopian language). After the massacres, Graziani became known as "the Butcher of Ethiopia" and was subsequently removed by Mussolini. Mussolini viewed the action as a major setback for Fascist propaganda and was concerned that the growing resentment among the natives would increase the number of individuals joining the resistance. As a result, Graziani was replaced by Prince Amedeo, Duke of Aosta, whose pacification by apartheid approach minimized the risk of a united front against the Italians as an aftermath of the massacre.

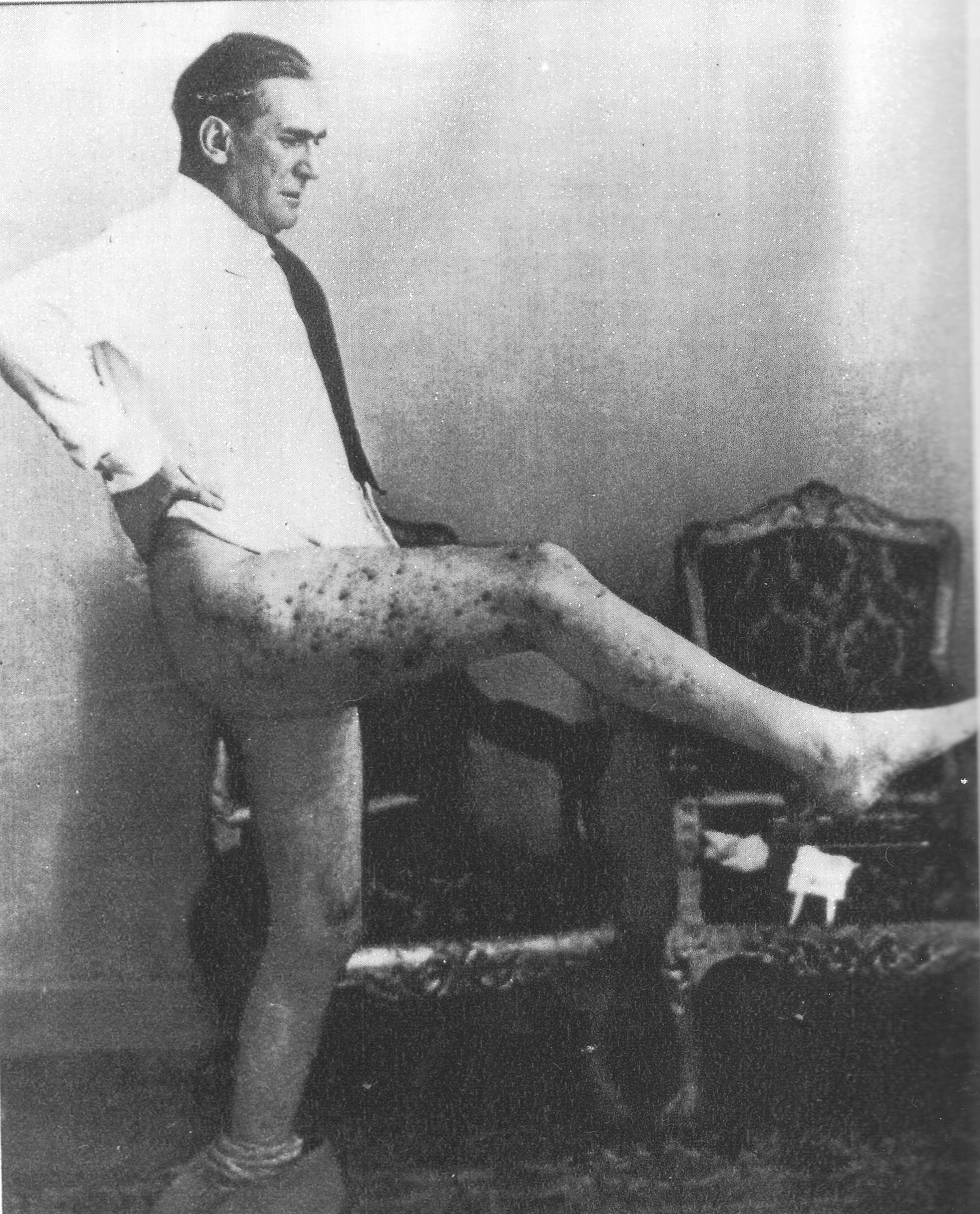
Rodolfo Graziani after surviving an attempt on his life

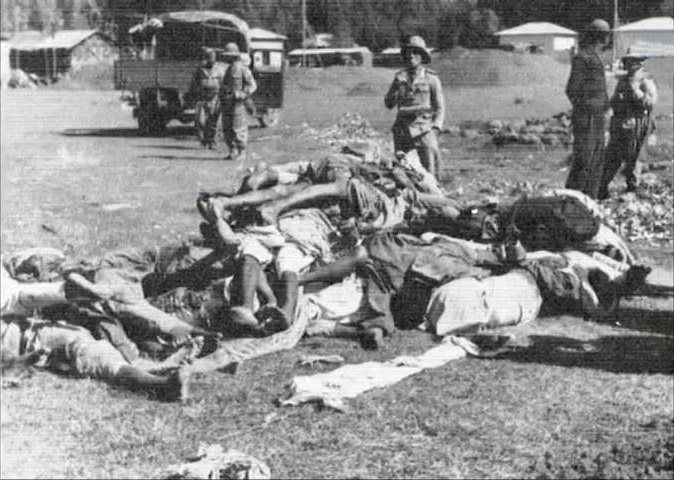
Dead bodies in a pile

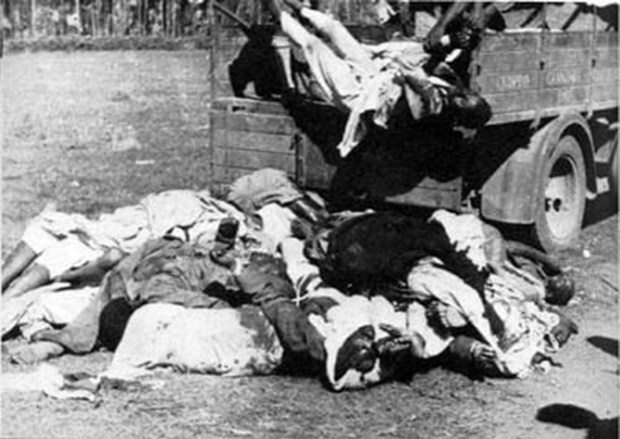
Dead bodies being loaded off of a transport

==== Concentration camps ====
Nocra prison camp was a notorious Italian detention facility located on Nocra Island in the Dahlak Archipelago, Eritrea. Originally established by the Italians in the late 19th century, it was used throughout the colonial period as a remote and harsh prison for political dissidents, Ethiopian resistance fighters, and other individuals deemed threats to Italian rule. The prison was infamous for its inhumane conditions, including extreme heat, forced labor, and inadequate food. Prisoners were subjected to harsh punishments, with many dying due to disease or malnutrition. During the Italian occupation of Ethiopia (1936–1941), Nocra housed much of the intelligentsia of Ethiopia with some being executed and the remainder exiled to penal colonies. As a result, post-World War II Ethiopia found itself impoverished of skilled workers.

The Danane concentration camp was another Italian concentration camp established near Mogadishu in Italian East Africa. Danane concentration camp prisoners were transported from Addis Ababa to Danane in covered trucks by night to avoid them being seen. By the time they arrived at Danane, a journey of more than four weeks, several had died of disease and hardships along the way. Conflicting reports make it hard to accurately assess the extent of death among the prisoners. Graziani ordered that they be given only enough food to survive, and the conditions in which they were held were dire. The facilities were poor, with insufficient latrines, and they faced a humid climate that contributed to outbreaks of malaria, stomach infections, and venereal diseases.

== Collapse ==
=== Second World War ===
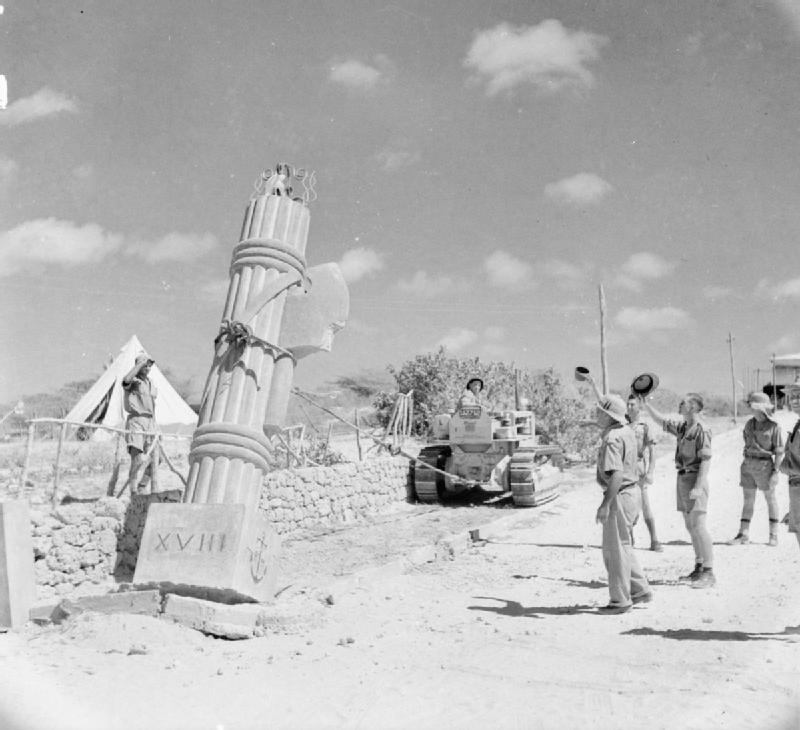
British troops use a bulldozer to pull down a fascist stone monument in Kismayo, 11 April 1941.

On 10 June 1940, Italy declared war on Britain and France, which made Italian military forces in Libya a threat to Egypt and those in the Italian East Africa a danger to the British and French territories in the Horn of Africa. Italian belligerence also closed the Mediterranean to Allied merchant ships and endangered British supply routes along the coast of East Africa, the Gulf of Aden, Red Sea and the Suez Canal. (The Kingdom of Egypt remained neutral during World War II, but the Anglo-Egyptian Treaty of 1936 allowed the British to occupy Egypt and Anglo-Egyptian Sudan.) Egypt, the Suez Canal, French Somaliland and British Somaliland were also vulnerable to invasion, but the Comando Supremo (Italian General Staff) had planned for a war after 1942. In the summer of 1940, Italy was far from ready for a long war or for the occupation of large areas of Africa.

Hostilities began on 13 June 1940, with an Italian air raid on the base of 1 Squadron Southern Rhodesian Air Force (237 (Rhodesia) Squadron RAF) at Wajir in the East Africa Protectorate (Kenya). In August 1940, the protectorate of British Somaliland was occupied by Italian forces and absorbed into Italian East Africa, which lasted around six months. Anthony Eden, the Secretary of State for War, convened a conference in Khartoum at the end of October 1940 with Selassie, South African Prime Minister Jan Smuts, Wavell, Lieutenant-General William Platt and Lieutenant-General Alan Cunningham. A plan to attack Italian East Africa, including support for Ethiopian resistance forces, was agreed. General Wavell, commander of British troops in the Middle East, charged Colonel Sandford to make plans to aid and mobilize the Ethiopian patriots.

The offensive began in January 1941, the British offensive immediately achieved decisive tactical successes which demonstrated the clear inferiority and weakness of the Italian forces. In the northern sector, Indian troops under General William Platt, after the initial advance in the lowlands up to Agordat, had to fight hard to overcome the fierce Italian resistance in the prolonged Battle of Keren, after which they occupied Asmara on 1 April and Massawa on 8 April. In the south, South African and Nigerian troops easily overcame Italian defenses along the Jubba River, and entered Mogadishu on February 25 with minimal resistance as the Italian-colonial forces quickly disintegrated. Italian domination in East Africa was rapidly collapsing; while the troops showed signs of demoralization and many colonial units deserted, the Ethiopian resistance intensified its activity and in Shoa the uprising of the population became general coinciding with the spread of news of the British advance. The guerrillas attacked the Italian units retreating from the southern front who were trying to regroup to the capital. On 6 April 1941, Addis Ababa was seized by the troops of General Alan Cunningham without any resistance. The remnants of the Italian forces in the Italian East Africa surrendered after staging a last stand at the Battle of Gondar in November 1941. In Ethiopia, some Italian forces continued to fight in an Italian guerrilla war in Ethiopia against the British and Ethiopian forces until the Armistice of Cassibile (3 September 1943) ended hostilities between Italy and the Allies. In January 1942, with the final official surrender of the Italians, the British signed an interim Anglo-Ethiopian Agreement with Selassie, acknowledging Ethiopian sovereignty. Makonnen Endelkachew was named as Prime Minister and on 19 December 1944, the final Anglo-Ethiopian Agreement was signed.

=== Treaty of Paris (1947) ===
In the peace treaty of February 1947, Italy officially renounced sovereignty over its African colonies of Libya, Eritrea and Somalia (art. 23) and recognized the independence of Ethiopia (art. 33). Italy further agreed to:

- Pay war reparation of US$25,000,000 to Ethiopia
- Accept "Annex XI of the Treaty", upon the recommendation of the United Nations General Assembly in Resolution 390, that indicated that Eritrea was to be federated with Ethiopia.

Eritrea was placed under British military administration and became an autonomous part of Ethiopia in 1952. After 1945, Britain controlled both Somalilands, as protectorates. In November 1949, the United Nations granted Italy trusteeship of Italian Somaliland under close supervision, on condition that Somalia achieve independence within ten years. British Somaliland became independent on 26 June 1960 as the State of Somaliland, the Trust Territory of Somalia (ex-Italian Somaliland) became independent on 1 July 1960 and the territories united as the Somali Republic. After the war, Italian Ethiopians were given a full pardon by the newly returned Selassie, as he saw the opportunity to continue the modernization efforts of the country.

== Legacy ==
The territorial reorganization carried out by Italy during the years of Italian East Africa left a lasting legacy on local attitudes in both Eritrea and Somalia, strengthening emerging forms of national consciousness. The question of the boundary between Ethiopia and Somalia was not satisfactorily resolved before Somali independence and became a persistent source of tension. This was largely due to the Pan-Somali aspirations of Somali-speaking populations in the Ogaden and Haud regions, which were returned to Ethiopia in stages between 1948 and 1954. Although national and regional ties, unlike in many other parts of Africa, ultimately proved stronger than colonial manipulations, Eritrea—the colonia primogenita ("first-born colony") of Italy—had undergone such profound political and economic transformations that reintegration with Ethiopia posed significant challenges. In recent years Italian writers coming from former colonies have challenge the removal of Italy’s colonial past from collective memory and contribute to redefining the very idea of Italianità, proposing it as a plural and transnational space. Among the most prominent contributors are writers such as Ribka Sibhatu, born in Eritrea, whose work blends orality, memory, and tradition while reflecting on the relationship between her cultural heritage and writing in Italian. Shirin Ramzanali Fazel, of Somali origin, has played a key role in recovering and articulating memories of colonialism and exile, often through autobiographical and testimonial narratives. Cristina Ali Farah, also Somali-Italian, explores issues such as the Somali civil war, diaspora experiences, and hybrid identities, adopting a fragmented and polyphonic narrative style. Although not herself a migrant from the former colonies, Igiaba Scego examines in both her fiction and essays the connections between Rome and Mogadishu, intertwining personal history with colonial memory and offering a critical reinterpretation of urban space and national history. Finally, Kaha Mohamed Aden develops a sharp and often ironic prose that challenges cultural stereotypes and dismantles exoticizing representations.

== See also ==
- List of governors-general of Italian East Africa
- List of governors of the governorates of Italian East Africa
- Political history of Eastern Africa
- Italians of Ethiopia
- Italian guerrilla war in Ethiopia
- Italian African Police
- Italian East African lira

== Bibliography ==
- Antonicelli, Franco (1961). Trent'anni di storia italiana 1915–1945 (in Italian). Turin: Einaudi. p. 387.
- Belladonna, Simone (2015). Gas in Etiopia. I crimini rimossi dell'Italia coloniale (in Italian). Vicenza: Neri Pozza. ISBN 978-88-545-0814-9.
- Ben-Ghiat, R.; Fuller, M. (30 April 2016). Italian Colonialism. New York City: Springer. ISBN 978-1-4039-8158-5.
- Brioni, Simone; Gulema, Shimelis Bonsa, eds. (2017). The Horn of Africa and Italy: Colonial, Postcolonial and Transnational Cultural Encounters. Oxford: Peter Lang. ISBN 978-1-78707-993-9.
- Burgwyn, H. James (16 April 1997). Italian Foreign Policy in the Interwar Period. Westport, CT / London: Praeger. ISBN 0-275-94877-3.
- Calchi Novati, Gian Carlo (2019). L'Africa d'Italia (in Italian). Rome: Carrocci. ISBN 978-8843096589.
- Campbell, Ian (2017). The Addis Ababa Massacre. Oxford / New York City: Oxford University Press. ISBN 978-0-19-067472-4. OCLC 960837850.
- Dear, I.C.B. (2005) [1995]. Foot, M.R.D. (ed.). Oxford Companion to World War II. New York: Oxford University Press. ISBN 978-0-19-280670-3.
- Di Lalla, Fabrizio (2014). Le italiane in Africa Orientale. Storie di donne in colonia (in Italian). Chieti: Solfanelli Editore. ISBN 978-8874978342.
- Di Lalla, Fabrizio (2016). Sotto due bandiere. Lotta di liberazione etiopica e resistenza italiana in Africa Orientale (in Italian). Chieti: Solfanelli Editore. ISBN 978-8874979325.
- Gooch, John (1 December 2020). Mussolini's War. New York City / London: Pegasus Books. ISBN 978-1-64313-548-9.
- Kallis, Aristotle A. (2000). Fascist Ideology. London / New York City: Psychology Press. ISBN 978-0-415-21612-8.
- Laqueur, Walter (2001). The New Terrorism. London: Weidenfeld & Nicolson. ISBN 978-1-84212-125-2.
- Mauri, Arnaldo (1967). Il mercato del credito in Etiopia (in Italian). Milan: Giuffrè. pp. XVI, 504.
- Mockler, Anthony (2019). Il mito dell'Impero. Storia delle guerre italiane in Abissinia e in Etiopia (in Italian). Res Gestae. ISBN 978-88-6697-269-3.
- Moseley, Ray (1 January 1999). Mussolini's Shadow. New Haven, CT: Yale University Press. ISBN 0-300-07917-6.
- O'Mahoney, Joseph (15 January 2018). Denying the Spoils of War. Edinburgh: Edinburgh University Press. ISBN 978-1-4744-3444-7.
- Pergher, Roberta (2 November 2017). Mussolini's Nation-Empire. Cambridge University Press. ISBN 978-1-108-35595-7.
- Sbacchi, Alberto (1997). Legacy of Bitterness. Lawrenceville, NJ: Red Sea Press (NJ). ISBN 0-932415-74-1.
- Spencer, John H. (7 July 2006). Ethiopia at Bay. Tsehai Publishers. ISBN 1-59907-000-6.
- Stewart, Andrew (1 January 2016). The First Victory. New Haven, CT: Yale University Press. ISBN 978-0-300-20855-9.
- Tuccimei, Ercole (1999). La Banca d'Italia in Africa, Presentazione di Arnaldo Mauri, Laterza, Bari, ISBN 88-420-5686-3 [in Italian].
