= British Military Administration (Ogaden) =

1941–1955 British Military Administration in Ogaden and Haud

British Military Administration in Ogaden and Haud
- 1941–1955
- Flag

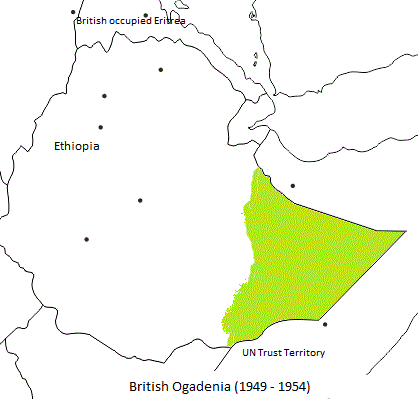
- British Ogaden
- Status: Subordinate to British Military Administration in Somalia (Ogaden); Subordinate to British Somaliland (Haud)
- Capital: Kebri Dahar
- Common languages: Somali
- Historical era: World War II • Cold War
  - Occupation: March 1941
  - Ogaden relinquished: 23 September 1948
  - Haud relinquished: 28 February 1955
Preceded by	Succeeded by
Italian East Africa	Ethiopian Empire
- Today part of: Ethiopia

The British Military Administration in Ogaden and Haud, or simply British Ogaden, was the period of British Military Administration from 1941 until 1955. The British came to control Ogaden, and later only Haud, in the aftermath of the East African Campaign in 1941. The British intention was to unite British Ogaden with their colony in Somaliland and the former Italian colony of Somaliland, creating a single polity. This policy was in particular voiced by British Foreign Secretary Ernest Bevin. However, during the British administration period Haile Selassie had made several territorial demands, and while his demands for the annexation of former Italian Somaliland might have been a bargaining tactic, he was serious about the return of Ethiopian territories in the Ogaden and the annexation of Eritrea. These requests were ignored by the British, who favoured a separate Eritrean entity, and a Greater Somalia under their control. However, after continued Ethiopian deliberations and pressure from the United States, this policy was abandoned.

The process of reversing the effects of World War II on Ethiopia did not completely end until 1955, when Ethiopia was restored to its internationally recognised borders of 1935, from before the Italian invasion. The British ceded Ogaden to Ethiopia in 1948, with the remaining British control over Haud being relinquished in 1955. After the decision to cede Ogaden to Ethiopia became public there were numerous calls, as well as violent insurgencies, intended to reverse this decision. The movement to gain self-determination from Addis Ababa has continued into the 21st century.
