= Macabre (1980 film) =

1980 Italian horror film directed by Lamberto Bava

- Directed by: Lamberto Bava
- Screenplay by: Pupi Avati; Roberto Gandus; Lamberto Bava; Antonio Avati
- Story by: Pupi Avati; Roberto Gandus; Lamberto Bava; Antonio Avati
- Produced by: Gianni Minervini; Antonio Avati
- Starring: Bernice Stegers; Stanko Molnar; Veronica Zinny; Roberto Posse; Elisa Kadigia Bove
- Cinematography: Franco Delli Colli
- Edited by: Piera Gabutti
- Music by: Ubaldo Continiello
- Production company: A.M.A. Film
- Distributed by: Medusa Distribuzione
- Release date: 17 April 1980 (Italy)
- Running time: 89 minutes
- Country: Italy
- Language: Italian
- Box office: ₤560 million

Macabre (Italian: Macabro) is a 1980 Italian horror film directed by Lamberto Bava.

== Plot ==
Jane Baker, a woman living in New Orleans, is carrying on an affair with a man, Fred, behind her husband's and children's backs. Her adolescent daughter, Lucy, suspects her mother is cheating on her father. Jane carries on trysts with Fred in an apartment she rents in a boarding house owned by Mrs. Duval, whose blind adult son Robert also lives in the building. While Jane is meeting with Fred for sex, Lucy drowns her little brother Michael in the bathtub and stages it as an accident. When Jane receives news of the death over the phone, Fred offers to drive her home, but they crash into a guardrail en route. Fred is brutally killed in the accident, but Jane survives.

A year later, Jane separates from her husband Leslie and moves in permanently at the Duvals' boardinghouse, which is managed by Robert alone, as his mother has died in the intervening year. On her first night in the boardinghouse, Robert offers to have Jane over for dinner, but she politely declines. Instead, she makes a shrine for Fred in the apartment, and tends to an unseen item locked in the refrigerator freezer box. That night, Robert hears the sound of Jane moaning with pleasure, as though masturbating. The next morning, Leslie and Lucy arrive to visit Jane, but their reunion is awkward. Later, Jane agrees to have a drink with Robert, whom she allows into her apartment while in the bathtub without hesitation, as he is blind. Jane flirts with Robert coyly, asking him if he has a girlfriend. Later, Robert hears Jane moaning and repeatedly calling Fred's name.

Suspicious, Robert has a friend obtain newspaper articles regarding the car accident that killed Fred, and he learns that Jane has been in a psychiatric hospital for the last year. That afternoon, Lucy arrives at the boardinghouse and convinces Robert to allow her into her mother's apartment, where she leaves a photo of her deceased brother on a table. Jane realizes Lucy has been in the apartment upon returning, and chastises Robert for letting her in. Jane briefly attempts to seduce Robert, but pulls away when he responds. Shortly after, he hears Jane greeting "Fred" in the hallway.

On the anniversary of her son Michael's death, Jane spends the day in town and visits his grave. Robert attempts to investigate Jane's apartment, and finds the locked freezer box in the kitchen. He also finds pillows laid out under Jane's bedspread in the shape of a person. His investigation is interrupted when Lucy arrives to visit her mother, but Robert turns her away. Later that night, Robert enters Jane's apartment after hearing loud moaning. He walks past the bedroom, where Jane is masturbating with Fred's severed head. After Jane finishes masturbating, she returns the severed head to the freezer box, where it is discovered by Robert.

Lucy overhears a phone call between her father and Robert, who attempts to inform Leslie of what he has discovered, but Leslie dismisses it as fantasy. Lucy confronts Robert, demanding to know the truth. Lucy breaks into the apartment and discovers Fred's severed head, but proceeds to tell Robert that he has imagined it. That weekend, Robert reluctantly joins Jane and Lucy for dinner; Lucy has prepared soup for them. During the meal, Jane finds an earlobe in her soup, and horrifiedly realizes Lucy has used flesh from Fred's severed head in the recipe. Lucy follows Jane to the bathroom, and goads before admitting to having murdered Michael. Jane strangles Lucy to death before submerging her in the bathtub. Robert, who attempts to run to Lucy's defense, is pushed down the stairs by Jane, and falls unconscious.

Jane retrieves Fred's severed head from the freezer and begins passionately kissing it. Robert awakens and attempts to phone police, but finds Jane has cut the phone cord. Robert enters Jane's apartment and she violently attacks him, but he kills her by smashing her face into the hot oven. He screams for Lucy, and crawls over Jane's bed, where suddenly Fred's severed head attacks him, biting his neck.

== Cast ==
- Bernice Stegers as Jane Baker
- Stanko Molnar as Robert Duval
- Veronica Zinny as Lucy Baker
- Roberto Posse as Fred Kellerman
- Ferdinando Orlandi as Mr. Wells
- Fernando Pannullo as Leslie Baker
- Elisa Kadigia Bove as Mrs. Duval

== Production ==
In mid-1979, Lamberto Bava was summoned to the offices of Pupi Avati with an offer. Bava had previously worked as an assistant director on several productions including those of his father Mario Bava, Joe D'Amato, Ruggero Deodato, and had just finished working with Dario Argento on Inferno. Bava entered the office expecting to be asked to be Avati's assistant on his new film, and found that he was being offered the chance to direct a film based on a clipping from an American newspaper about a woman who kept her husband's severed head in a refrigerator. The Avatis, Bava and Roberto Gandus spent the next few weeks working on a draft, with Bava left briefly to do some re-shoots for Inferno in the United States. While overseas, Bava learned that Medusa Distribuzione had greenlit the project which led to Bava to start shooting the film in November.

Filming lasted for four weeks. The film was shot in Gardone Riviera and Crespi d'Adda and on location in New Orleans.

== Release ==
Macabre was distributed theatrically in Italy by Medusa Distribuzione on April 17, 1980. The film grossed a total of 560 million Italian lire on its domestic release in Italy. The film was also shown at the Sitges Film Festival in October 1980 in Spain. It was released in the United States as The Frozen Terror on 28 October 1983.

Macabre was released twice on DVD in the United States. The first time was in 2001 by Anchor Bay Entertainment. The second DVD release came from Blue Underground in 2007.

== Reception ==
Kim Newman (Monthly Film Bulletin) stated that "with only two films, however, Lamberto Bava has established a distinct personality within the genre" noting that Lamberto Bava "favours story-lines as tight and inner-directed as his neurotic characters." Newman noted that Macabre "will probably be remembered as the definitive severed-head-in-the-fridge film."
