= David Rickard =

New Zealand artist

- Born: 1975 (age 50–51); Ashburton, New Zealand
- Education: University of Auckland; Brera Academy, Milan; Central Saint Martins, London
- Occupation: Artists

David Rickard (born 1975) is a contemporary artist based in London, UK. He works across a range of media including sculpture, installation, photography, moving image and performance.

== Education ==
Born in Ashburton, New Zealand and raised in Wakanui, he completed a Bachelor of Architecture at University of Auckland, before studying fine art at Brera Academy, Milan and Central Saint Martins, London.

== Work ==
With a background in architecture early works focused on the relationship between sculpture and the built environment, often shown within the public space, such as Test Flights. at the Economist Plaza, London commissioned by the Contemporary Art Society and large-scale installations that challenged the architectural envelope of gallery spaces. This later led to an ongoing series of works that consider air as a physical presence within architectural volumes, instead of a void, as seen with 24-hour performance Exhaust and the installation A roomful of Air.

Recent works have often engaged collaboration with scientists and the public located around the globe to reconsider concepts of material and spatial perception in connection with the body, community, and wider society in the context of the Anthropocene. This collaborative approach is evident within the work International Airspace (2019–20) a new airspace created through collaboration with 27 countries.

He has undertaken residencies at the European Ceramic Work Centre, Fonds Belval Luxembourg, Kunstdepot Switzerland, Pangea Sculpture Centre, and University College London. He is represented by Copperfield, London and Michela Rizzo, Venice.

His work has been exhibited at Fortuny Museum, Venice, Castlefield Gallery, Manchester, Museum Kranenburgh, Netherlands, Kielder Art & Architecture, The Jerwood Space, London, NEST, The Hague, Weizmann Institute, Tel Aviv, Round the Clock, 54th Venice Biennale, Venice, Royal Society, London
