= British Military Administration (Somaliland) =

1941–1950 British control of parts of Somalia

British Military Administration in Somaliland
- 1941–1950
- Flag
- Government: Military administration
- Chief Administrator
  - 1941–1943: William Scupham
  - 1943–1948: Denis Wickham
  - 1948: Eric de Candole
  - 1948–1950: Geoffrey Gamble
- History
  - Established: 25 February 1941
  - End of occupation: 1 April 1950
- Currency: pound
Preceded by	Succeeded by
Italian East Africa	Trust Territory of Somaliland; British Somaliland

The British Military Administration of Somaliland was the control of the regions of British Somaliland and of the former Italian Somaliland by the British from 1941 until 1949. At the end of 1949, it became a United Nations trust territory which would last from 1950 until 1960 whilst under Italian administration.

== Overview ==
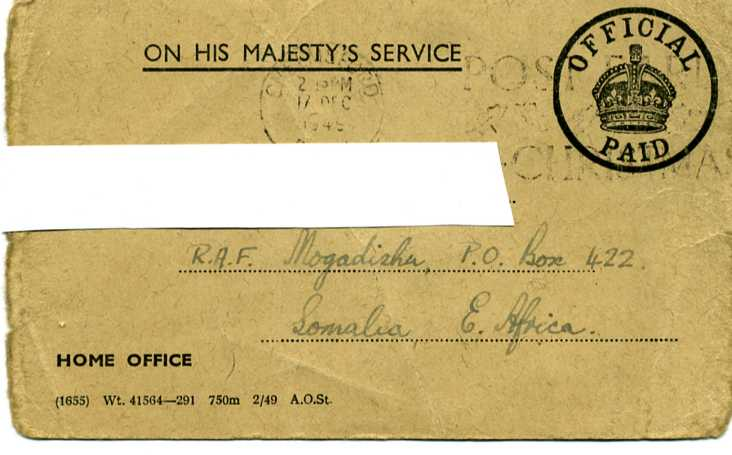
A voting registration card in Mogadishu during the British military administration (1949).

During the Second World War, Britain occupied Italian Somaliland and militarily administered the territory as well as British Somaliland. Faced with growing Italian political pressure inimical to continued British tenure and Somali aspirations for independence, the Somalis and the British came to see each other as allies. The first modern Somali political party, the Somali Youth Club (SYC), was subsequently established in Mogadishu in 1943; it was later renamed the Somali Youth League (SYL). The SYL evolved into the dominant party, and had a moderate ideology. The league was also the organization primarily behind the Somali independence movement. The Hizbia Digil Mirifle Somali (HDMS) party served as the principal opposition to the right, although its platform was generally in agreement with that of the SYL.

In 1945, the Potsdam Conference was held, where it was decided not to return Italian Somaliland to Italy, and that the territory would be under British Military Administration (BMA). As a result of this failure on the part of the Big Four powers to agree on what to do with Italy's former colonies, Somali nationalist rebellion against the Italian colonial administration culminated in a violent confrontation in 1948. 24 Somalis and 51 Italians died in the ensuing political riots in several coastal towns.

The Royal Air Force was used for demonstration of force against unrest across the territory.

=== Transfer to UN Trusteeship ===
In November 1949, the United Nations finally opted to grant Italy trusteeship of the former Italian Somaliland, but only under close supervision and on the condition — first proposed by the SYL and other nascent Somali political organizations, such as Hizbia Digil Mirifle Somali (later Hizbia Dastur Mustaqbal Somali, or HDMS) and the Somali National League (SNL), that were then agitating for independence — that Somalia achieves independence within ten years. The Somali Youth League had proposed a UN Trusteeship to lead Somalia to independence, under the condition that it was not under Italian administration and that the Trusteeship managed all Somali territories. In a memo to the UN the SYL stated:

"We do not pretend we can stand on our own feet for the moment, but ask the United Nations Trusteeship council to decide questions relating to the formation, boundaries, and administration of a Somali Trust Territory known as Somalia, this territory to consist of all areas present predominantly populated by Somalis."

The Somali Youth League fiercely opposed the transfer of Somalia back to Italian control and accused Britain of bartering with the country in order to appease Italy. The League would campaign against the return of Italian rule with the slogan, "No matter what the color, a wolf is always a wolf." The decision to put Somalia back under the control of its former colonial ruler was highly controversial as Somalis widely felt that the Trust Territory was being established for Italian interests.

== See also ==
- Allied occupation of Libya

== General references ==
- Drysdale, John (2000). Stoics Without Pillows: A way forwards for the Somalilands. Haan Publishing. ISBN 1874209731. OCLC 49494935.
- Hussen, Abdulaziz M. (2021). Denial of Independence: How the Four Powers and Italy Setup Somalia For Failure and Dismemberment. ISBN 9798503523416. OCLC 1302584499.
- Ismail, Ismail Ali (2010). Governance: The Scourge and Hope of Somalia. Trafford Publishing. ISBN 9781426919800. OCLC 620115177.
- Samatar, Abdi Ali (2016). Africa's First Democrats: Somalia's Aden A. Osman and Abdirazak H. Hussen. Indiana University Press. ISBN 9780253022370.
- Tripodi, Paolo (1999). The Colonial Legacy in Somalia : Rome and Mogadishu : from Colonial Administration to Operation Restore Hope. St. Martin's Press. ISBN 978-0-312-22393-9. OCLC 41315365.
- Lewis, I.M. (2002). A Modern History of the Somali: Revised, Updated & Expanded (4th ed.). Ohio University Press. ISBN 9780821414958. OCLC 50747856.
- Hussein, Abdirazak Haji (2017). Abdirazak Haji Hussein : My role in the foundation of the Somali nation-state, a political memoir. African World Press. ISBN 9781569025314. OCLC 980302551.
- Sheikh, Mohamed Aden (2021). Back to Mogadishu: Memoirs of a Somali herder. Barkin Publishing. ISBN 9798777822345.
- Petrucci, Pietro (1993). Mogadiscio (in Italian). Nuova. ISBN 9788839708342. OCLC 797765340.
- Lewis, I. M. (1961). A Pastoral Democracy: a study of pastoralism and politics among the Northern Somali of the Horn of Africa. Great Britain: Oxford University Press.
- Pankhurst, E. Sylvia (1951). Ex-Italian Somaliland. Philosophical Library. ISBN 9780806530543. OCLC 67336.
