= David Packer (actor) =

American actor

- Born: Passaic, New Jersey, U.S.
- Occupation: Actor
- Years active: 1982–2015

David Packer is an American actor.

== Early life ==
He was born in Passaic, New Jersey.

== Career ==
His first starring role was as the human collaborator Daniel Bernstein in the 1983 NBC miniseries V. He reprised the role in the 1984 sequel V: The Final Battle.

During the first month of filming for V, the 20-year-old Packer was present in the house when co-star Dominique Dunne was killed outside by her ex-boyfriend; he faced public criticism for not having done more to prevent Dunne's death. Showrunner Kenneth Johnson described in a 2023 interview that his other co-stars were "totally accepting of the fact that he had been a part of a tragedy, and that it was weighing on him", also describing how upset Packer was at Dunne's funeral. In the same interview lead actress Faye Grant is quoted as saying "I do want to point out that he was a child. He was a very young person when that happened. And he was frightened. And that’s really all I can say about that."

Packer subsequently appeared in such films as RoboCop (1987), You Can't Hurry Love (1988), Strange Days (1995), True Crime (1996) and Infested (2002). In 1994, he received the Cable Ace Award for his role as Leo in the 1993 television series Big Al. He also appeared in the video game Double Switch as Jeff, who leads the band Scream, and has made guest appearances in numerous television shows such as ER, Fame, St. Elsewhere, thirtysomething, The Division, CSI: Crime Scene Investigation, CSI: NY and M*A*S*H.

== Filmography ==
Year	Title	Role	Notes
1983	V	Daniel Bernstein	2 episodes
1984	V: The Final Battle	Daniel Bernstein	3 episodes
1987	RoboCop	Emergency Doctor #2	
1988	You Can't Hurry Love	Eddie Hayes	
1989	Trust Me	Sam Brown	
1989	Valentino Returns	Messner	
1989	The Runnin' Kind	Joey Curtis	
1990	Crazy People	Mark Olander	
1990	Call Me Anna	Glenn Bell	TV movie
1992	Day-o, um amigo de infância	Tony DeGeorge	
1993	Double Switch	Jeff	Video Game
1994	Cityscrapes: Los Angeles	Bill	
1995	True Crime	Sergeant Collins	
1995	Strange Days	Lane	
1995	The Courtyard	Jack Morgan	
1997	No Strings Attached	Ben Lowenstein	
1997	Bombshell	Brad	
1998	Almost Heroes	Bidwell	
1998	Beach Movie	Howard	
2000	Intrepid	George	
2001	Hollywood Palms	Joel	
2002	Infested	Elliot	
2003	You're Killing Me. ..	Al Barsini	
2010	Peep World	Eli	
