= Camila Ashland =

American actress

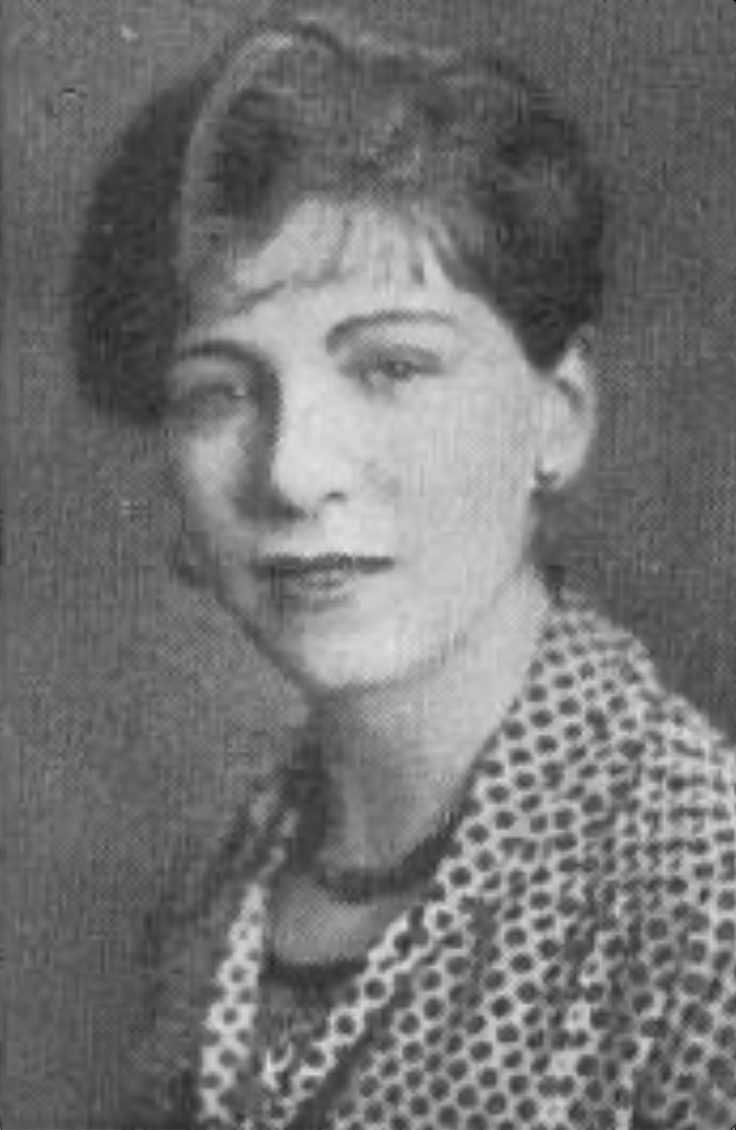
- Ashland in 1928
- Born: Camille Stanczewski; March 24, 1911; Chicago, Illinois, US
- Died: September 12, 2008 (aged 97); California, US
- Occupations: Actress, singer
- Spouse: James Vincent Russo
- Children: 3

Camila Ashland Russo (born Camille J. Stanczewski, March 24, 1911 – September 12, 2008) was an American actress best known for her work on the stage. A native of Chicago, she began performing as a dancer in vaudeville as a child. After training as an actress at the School of the Art Institute of Chicago, she moved to New York where she had an active career on Broadway from the 1940s through the 1970s. She was nominated for a Tony Award for Best Featured Actress in a Play for her performance in Black Comedy/White Lies in 1967. She was also active in American regional theatre.

As a screen actress, Ashland's career was interrupted in the 1950s when she was put on the Hollywood blacklist after making a few television appearances. She resumed work in American television and film in the 1970s; her roles included Minnie Du Val in Dark Shadows (1970), Alice Grant in General Hospital (1976-1977), and Ruby in the miniseries V (1983) and its sequel V The Final Battle (1984). Later in life she lived in Palm Desert, California where she founded and directed the Palm Desert Community Theatre. She continued to perform publicly as late as 2004 when she was in her 90s. She died in 2008 at the age of 97.

== Early life and education ==
The daughter of Walter Stanczewski and Louise Stanczewski (née Rybezynski), Camille J. Stanczewski was born in Chicago, Illinois, on March 24, 1911. As a child she performed as a dancer in vaudeville. She graduated from Carl Schurz High School in Chicago in 1928. After earning a Bachelor of Music degree, she trained as an actor at the Goodman Theatre's School of Drama which was part of the School of the Art Institute of Chicago. In 1939 she married actor James Vincent Russo, who later became a director for Broadway shows. The Russos moved to New York after their marriage, and Ashland continued her education there as a member of the Actors Studio.

== Early career ==
Ashland first worked in New York City under her married name Camille Russo, directing the 1940 Tudor Players production of Dorrance Davis's Apron Strings. She soon adopted the stage name Camila Ashland, under which she made her Broadway debut as Parasha in Leo Birinski's The Day Will Come at the National Theatre in 1944; she was publicly known as Camila Ashland from then on.

She appeared as Kathi Hovach in the premiere of George Ross and Rose C. Feld's Sophie Halenczik at the The Playhouse on Rodney Square (PRS) in Wilmington in November 1944, a role she repeated at the Locust Street Theatre in Philadelphia. She returned to the PRS in 1946 as Bessie Clary in Vera Caspary's Laura with a cast led by Miriam Hopkins and Tom Neal. She next appeared in the Broadway production of Finian's Rainbow as a replacement cast member sometime during its 1947-1948 run.

In 1950 Ashland portrayed Wilson in Rudolf Besier's The Barretts of Wimpole Street at the Flatbush Theatre in Brooklyn with a cast led by Susan Peters. In July 1951 she replaced Mary Finney as The Madam in the Broadway musical Make a Wish. While not in the opening night cast, she portrayed Bessie in the original Broadway production of Tennessee Williams's The Rose Tattoo in 1951. When the show went on tour directly from New York to Philadelphia's Locust Street Theatre in November 1951 Ashland remained in that part. Some of the other stops on The Rose Tattoo tour included the Colonial Theatre, Boston (1951), and the American Theater in St. Louis (1952).

In 1953 Ashland portrayed Aunt Cissy in the musical A Tree Grows in Brooklyn at Music Circus after having previously performed there as Parthy in Show Boat. That same year she appeared at the Astor Theater in Syracuse, New York as Miss Preen in The Man Who Came to Dinner and Aunt Queenie in Bell, Book and Candle. In 1954 she portrayed the Queen of the Underworld in Chuck Wagon of America, a show written and staged in Omaha for the official celebration of the centennial of the settlement of the state of Nebraska. In 1955 she portrayed Mrs. Mullin in Rodgers and Hammerstein's Carousel with the St. Louis Municipal Opera.

Ashland first appeared on American television in the early 1950s as a guest actress in episodes of Armstrong Circle Theatre, The Web, and The Gabby Hayes Show. This was followed by an appearance on the TV series Danger. Following that, her chances at a career in American television and film were severely hampered as she became an accidental target of McCarthyist politics. People who had seen her on Danger mistook her for Madeline Lee, whom she resembled and who was already on the Hollywood blacklist. As a result of this confusion, the CBS Television network received a flood of anonymous angry calls complaining about Ashland's appearance. Ashland was confused by this reaction, as she had never had anything to do with politics. She was placed on the blacklist, and did not work again on screen for almost 20 years.

== Later career ==
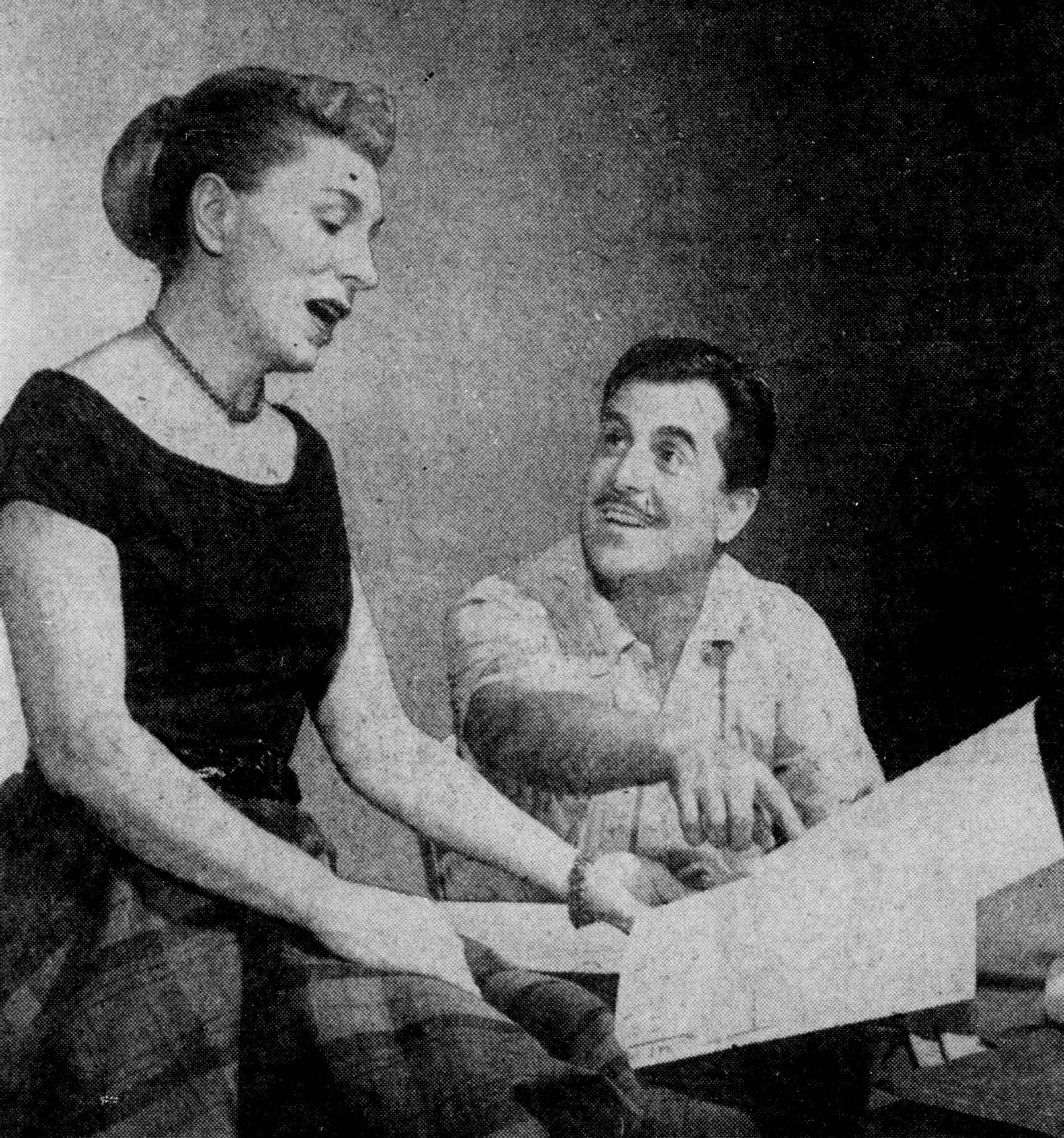
Ashland with husband James Vincent Russo practicing for a play

In 1956 Ashland returned to Broadway as Jane Kaiser in Allen and Ruby Sully Boretz's The Hot Corner at the John Golden Theatre. Subsequent Broadway credits included Mrs. Ochs in Eugène Ionesco's Rhinoceros (1961, Longacre Theatre), Giulianna in Jack Richardson's Lorenzo (1963, Plymouth Theatre), and Claire Marshall in Henry Denker's A Case of Libel (1963-1964, Longacre Theatre). In 1967 she was nominated for the Tony Award for Best Featured Actress in a Play for her performance as Miss Furnival in Peter Shaffer's Black Comedy which was staged in a double bill with The White Liars under the title Black Comedy/White Lies at the Ethel Barrymore Theatre.

In 1968 Ashland portrayed Mrs. Leek in Nunnally Johnson, Jule Styne, and Yip Harburg's musical Darling of the Day at Broadway's George Abbott Theatre. In April 1971 she replaced Eda Reiss Merin as Bertha in the Broadway revival of Hedda Gabler at the Playhouse Theatre. In 1972 she replaced Marcie Stringer as Emily Whitman in the original production of Stephen Sondheim's Follies at the Winter Garden Theatre in which she performed the song "Rain on the Roof". Her final Broadway performances were in 1973 as Mrs. Sullivan in Jerry Livingston's musical Molly at the Alvin Theatre and both Sadie and Mrs. Wagstaff in the revival of Clare Boothe Luce's The Women at the 46th Street Theatre.

In 1971 Ashland appeared at the Shubert Theater in Philadelphia as Helene in A Doll's House. In 1974 she portrayed Mrs. Atkins in Eugene O'Neill's Beyond the Horizon at the McCarter Theatre in Princeton, New Jersey. In 1988 she starred as Miss Helen in the New Mexico Repertory Theatre's production of The Road to Mecca.

On television Ashland was known for her recurring role as Minnie Du Val in Dark Shadows (1970), which also included parts as Mrs. Hutchins and Mrs. Purdy during time jump segments in the story line. She also starred on the soap opera General Hospital as Alice Grant from 1976 to 1977, and in the 1983 NBC miniseries V and its 1984 sequel, V: The Final Battle, in which she played Ruby Engels. She made guest appearances on The Streets of San Francisco (1977, as Mary Johnson), Taxi (1979, as Mrs. Sherman), Skag (1980), Cheers (1985, as Drusilla Dimeglio), Hardcastle and McCormick (1986, as Myrtle), and The Munsters Today (1991, as Aunt Lucretia). Her final television appearance was in 1992 as Mrs. Hubbard in the Golden Girls episode "Questions and Answers" in which Betty White's character Rose Nylund and her therapy dog help comfort Hubbard as she is dying.

Her big screen and television film credits include House of Dark Shadows (1970, Collinwood Party Guest), Sybil (1976, as Cam), 10 (1979), Any Which Way You Can (1980, as Hattie), Rape and Marriage: The Rideout Case (1980, as Jackie Godfrey), Amos (1985, as Mildred Lasher), Surviving: A Family in Crisis (1985), and Second Serve (1986, as Mrs. Brady).

In her later career Ashland worked periodically in regional theatre in Southern California where she also lived. She performed locally until as late as 2004. She was also the founder and director of the Palm Desert Community Theatre, a community theatre organization that presented annual seasons of plays and musicals.

== Personal life ==
While living in New York, Ashland and her husband James adopted two sons, Walter and Mario Russo, after the death of their baby daughter. In 1974, James's health issues led them to move to Palm Desert, California. He died in 1982. Camila served as a board member of the Palm Desert branch of the English-Speaking Union.

Camila Ashland Russo died in California on September 12, 2008. Her son Walter succeeded her as artistic director of the Palm Desert Community Theatre, which he led for 17 years.
