= V (franchise) =

American science fiction franchise

- Created by: Kenneth Johnson
- Original work: V
- Owner: Warner Bros. Entertainment

Print publications
- Book: Fiction books
- Novels: Original series (1984–88); V The Second Generation (2008)
- Comics: See below

Films and television
- Television series: V (original miniseries) (1983); V The Final Battle (1984); V (weekly series) (1984–85); V (remake) (2009-11)

Games
- Video game: V

Audio
- Soundtracks: V: The Series (Original Soundtrack Recordings) (1998); V (2009)

V is an American science fiction franchise created by American writer, producer and director Kenneth Johnson about a genocidal invading alien race known as the "Visitors"—reptilian humanoids disguised as human beings—trying to take over Earth, and the human reaction to this, including the Resistance group attempting to stop them, while others collaborate with the aliens for power and personal wealth.

The two-part television miniseries V aired in 1983, written and directed by Johnson. It had cost US$13 million to produce. It was followed in 1984 by a three-part miniseries, V: The Final Battle, and a nineteen-episode weekly television series, V (sometimes referred to as V: The Series) during the 1984–85 television season. ABC ran a remake series, produced by Warner Bros. Television, which ran for two seasons totalling 22 episodes from November 3, 2009, to March 15, 2011.

In the original series, the title refers to the "V for Victory" sign. A group of children are shown spray painting generic graffiti over the Visitors' propaganda posters, but are then shown how to spray the "V" over the posters by Abraham Bernstein, a Holocaust survivor, who explains the meaning of the sign to them as he defaces the first poster. In the 2009 reboot of the series, however, V is used within the show as an abbreviation for the Visitors.

A number of novels, comic books, video games and other media have been spun off from the franchise. Johnson's novel V: The Second Generation, an alternative sequel to the first miniseries which disregards V: The Final Battle and V: The Series because of his non-involvement with them, was released on February 5, 2008. Johnson stated he was in negotiations for a TV adaptation of his sequel novel, but Warner Bros. opted to do the 2009 remake series instead.

== Television ==
- V (original 2-part miniseries) (1983)
- V: The Final Battle (sequel 3-part miniseries) (1984)
- V (weekly series) (1984–1985)
- V (remake weekly series) (2009–2011)

The original miniseries debuted in the United States on NBC on May 1, 1983. Series creator Kenneth Johnson has said that the story was inspired by the 1935 novel It Can't Happen Here by Sinclair Lewis. In a commentary track on the DVD release of the first miniseries, Johnson reveals that V was originally intended as a straightforward political thriller, charting the rise of a fascist movement in the United States. NBC was interested in a sci-fi hit, to capitalize on the success of films such as the Star Wars trilogy.

The miniseries was successful enough to spawn a sequel, V: The Final Battle, which was meant to conclude the story, but this led to a further continuation as a weekly television series in 1984–1985. Johnson left the franchise during production of The Final Battle. The abrupt cancellation of the weekly TV series in the spring of 1985 meant that the series ended with an unresolved cliffhanger. V was remade as a new weekly TV series in 2009, which initially attracted high ratings. However, ratings fell and the remake was cancelled after a brief 10-episode second season, also ending with an unresolved cliffhanger.

== Film attempts ==
For many years, Kenneth Johnson tried to resurrect V as another television production. When his attempts failed, and Warner Bros (who own the television rights to the property) opted to remake the series instead, Johnson then tried to develop V as a feature film. However, his various attempts at this also failed to get off the ground. On February 6, 2018, the reincarnated Desilu Studios announced that it would be producing a feature film of V. The film would be written and directed by Kenneth Johnson, and produced by John Hermansen, Barry Opper, and Johnson. Johnson added "We are delighted to team up with Desilu to bring the timeless—and timely—story of resistance against tyranny into the 21st Century ... V will be the first of a cinematic trilogy which will tell the full epic tale in the manner I always envisioned." Johnson later updated his site to say that Desilu's option has expired, and referred to allegations that the individual helming the new Desilu was defrauding investors. Since then, no further news has surfaced about another V production, either for film or television.

== Novels ==
=== Original series ===
V spun off a series of original novels. Five were originally planned but the range soon extended beyond these. The first was a novelization of the first two miniseries combined into one story, originally planned as 2 books, Pinnacle later changed its mind during its writing, and decreed that it should be one book (The publishers were then left with the option of another book, this became East Coast Crisis) Because the Writers' Guide was not ready in time for the authors to consult, most of the original novels that followed did not feature characters or continuing storylines from the TV series, but rather focused on battles against the alien invaders in other parts of the world, some were also set during the "unrecorded year" between the end of "The Final Battle" and "Liberation day" to get around this problem.

While the series was on the air, new novels were published once a month by Pinnacle Paperbacks, and in the U.K. every 2 months by New English Library. In 1987–88, the remaining 5 books, left unpublished with the demise of Pinnacle Books, were published by Tor. No U.K. publisher was found for these.

No.	Title	Author	Date	ISBN
1	V	A.C. Crispin	May 1984	0-523-42237-7
An adaptation of the original miniseries, as well as The Final Battle. There are some differences between the novel and the televised miniseries, due to the author working from a different script to the televised version, and not being made aware of changes made to said script, including the deaths of several characters who are still alive in the televised version. This includes Chris Farber, leading to confusion about his return in V: The Series, also different in this novelisation is the manner in which Elizabeth a.k.a. The Starchild deals with the doomsday weapon.
2	East Coast Crisis	Howard Weinstein, A.C. Crispin	September 1984	0-523-42259-8
Concurrent with the first novel, but set in New York and Washington, D.C., the book begins in space while the fleet approaches the Earth (the ending of the novel briefly goes into the aftermath of The Final Battle). The commander, Roger, and his subordinates, Angela and Jennifer, arrive and after the Visitors are revealed, the resistance group named White Christmas is formed to combat them. They now have to face Roger's devious plan: to surpass the human food storage by emptying one of New York's neighborhoods next to their chemical plants.
3	The Pursuit of Diana	Allen L. Wold	December 1984	0-523-42401-9
While Donovan pursues and recaptures Diana, the LA resistance tries to revive those stored on the mothership after capturing it in the events of the first book. However they are faced with the converted government, and several of the "sixth column", surviving Visitors on board the mothership who are still loyal to Diana, who is imprisoned on board after her capture.
4	The Chicago Conversion	George Wyatt Proctor	January 1985	0-523-42429-9
In Chicago, the Visitors' grip on the Earth has been freed with the release of the Red Dust, the bacteria discovered in the digestive tract of Robin Maxwell's hybrid children, which killed the more reptilian twin. Cultured and dried, and dispersed via hot air balloons across the world by the resistance, it causes near-instant death to Visitors, but can also cause mutation, sterility and ultimately, death, to all Earth life in excessive amounts. Prior to this event, High Captain Gerald manages to finally storm the resistance, but with little success, as they were currently liberating the Chicago Art Museum, the Visitors' ground base. Seconds before the commander of the Chicago Mothership, Alicia, calls him back for withdrawal (after the Red Dust is deployed worldwide), he is able to distribute anti-toxin from the resistance base into his shock troopers. Though Alicia is frustrated at her subordinate, she gives him a chance to redeem himself, which Gerald jumps at, as unknowingly to Alicia, Gerald is a double agent. Her plan is to convert the resistance, and "unlock the key" to regaining Chicago.
5	The Florida Project	Tim Sullivan	February 1985	0-523-42430-2
Set during the unrecorded year between the end of "The Final Battle" and "Liberation day", The Visitors, hidden in the everglade swamps, by hologram projection, kidnap human scientists to unwittingly aid them in their plan to create a human-reptilian hybrid to wipe out the resistance. Note: This novel was written before the writers guide was available, and so contradicts the TV series in some points.
6	Prisoners and Pawns	Howard Weinstein	March 1985	0-523-42439-6
The first novel to be actually set during the weekly series, Lydia and Diana try to wrestle power from each other while trying to get the resistance out of the way. The resistance find that there might be collaborators in their group.
7	The Alien Swordmaster	Somtow Sucharitkul	April 1985	0-523-42441-8
Another book taking place during the unrecorded year, Tomoko Jones is revived to become the consort of the fearsome Fieh Chan, Visitor Commander of Tokyo. Meanwhile, her husband finds a plot to capture the Earth's martial arts masters for conversion.
8	The Crivit Experiment	Allen L. Wold	May 1985	0-523-42466-3
A Visitor experiment in breeding, if successful, will ravage the Eastern Coast Seaboards (causing serious environmental consequences). The experiment is based on the crivit species, which exists in the Visitor's home planet.
9	The New England Resistance	Tim Sullivan	June 1985	0-523-42467-1
A human scientist tries to test a toxin that he developed, and that could help decimate the Visitors. Tipped off by a human collaborator, the Visitors arrive in New England, desperate to destroy this new threat to their renewed invasion of Earth. The local Resistance is then picked off, and a new group of resistance fighters ends up being formed.
10	Death Tide	A.C. Crispin, Deborah Marshall	July 1985	0-523-42469-8
The Resistance works on a new version of the red dust that lives in seaweed and thus protects the planet's water, while also trying to coax a strain to live in land-based vegetation; Diana works on a defoliant that will destroy the seaweed. Marjorie Donovan returns.
11	The Texas Run	George W. Proctor	September 1985	0-523-42470-1
The Texas resistance has been weakened by Commander Garth and his batch of Shocktroopers. Set after the TV episode "Visitors Choice".
12	Path to Conquest	Howard Weinstein	September 1987	0-8125-5725-5
The resistance of the East Coast, and the free zone, are in danger, if Project Icewind, part one of a new two pronged scheme by Diana to first radically alter the Earth's weather, and then contaminate our oil reserves with a new bacteria, rendering it both useless as a fuel and dangerous to humans too, is put into action.
13	To Conquer the Throne	Tim Sullivan	November 1987	0-8125-5727-1
Great Britain is to become the Visitor's conquest and the launching pad for them to conquer the entire Earth.
14	The Oregon Invasion	Jayne Tannehill	January 1988	0-8125-5729-8
The Visitors initiate a fourth invasion in Oregon.
15	Below the Threshold	Allen L. Wold	March 1988	0-8125-5732-8
Lewis is a Natural, a Visitor who wants to live in peace with the humans in Freeport, a city without red dust. But humans in Freeport are in danger of being controlled by the Visitors, through a local TV station.
16	Symphony of Terror	Somtow Sucharitkul	May 1988	0-8125-5482-5
The Jones family (from previous novel The Alien Swordmaster), enlisted by Juliet Parrish, travel to Washington, DC to uncover the plans of a Visitor spy who has a new Visitor-created metal alloy, Papinium, which is impervious to the Red dust, which he is using to coat secret tunnels into the free zone with, thus freeing up those areas to renewed Visitor invasion.

=== The Second Generation ===
Kenneth Johnson—V's original creator—had been trying to bring the series back to television as a sequel to the original miniseries that would ignore the second miniseries and all the other subsequent fiction. When Warner Bros. decided to go with a complete reboot instead, Johnson wrote his story as a new novel.

No.	Title	Author	Date	ISBN
1	V: The Original Miniseries	Kenneth Johnson and A.C. Crispin	November 2008	0-7653-2199-8
Crispin's adaptation of the original miniseries without any of the chapters that originally covered The Final Battle. In their place is a short work by Johnson linking this new version of the book to The Second Generation.
2	V: The Second Generation	Kenneth Johnson	February 2008	0-7653-1907-1
Twenty years after the original miniseries, the Visitors are in de facto control of Earth, and life across the planet is analogous to living under the Nazis in occupied Paris. In response to the message sent at the end of the original miniseries, the Resistance–which has been slowly losing ground for years, especially after Diana's "Great Purge"–is contacted by another alien race, the insect-like Zedti. However, their actions trigger suspicions among the human fighters. The novel ends on a note of uncertainty, with the fate of the world seemingly in the hands of The Zedti.

== Books ==
A number of non-fiction books, covering all aspects of the saga including interviews, articles and episode guides, have been published, most notably the six volumes of The V Files, written By James Van Hise and Ed Gross, published by New Media Books/Psi Fi movie Press in the mid 1980s, and the two French books, V: l'autre guerre des mondes (V: The Other War of the Worlds) by Francis Valery, first published in paperback in 1993 by DLM editions (and reissued in 1995), covering the entire original saga up to and including, the unfilmed episode #20 "The Attack", and V: les miroirs du passe (V: The Mirrors of the Past), by Didier Liardet, published by Yris Editions in 2011, this paperback features a full episode guide to both the 1980s original and the modern reboot, details the history of the show, and also includes photos of merchandise from the series over the years.

In 2017, a book by Dan Copp entitled Fascist Lizards from Outer Space: The Politics, Literary Influences and Cultural Impact of Kenneth Johnson's V was published by McFarland & Company.

Also of note is John L. Flynn's Future Threads: Costume Design for the Science Fiction World, published in 1985 by New Media books, which has instructions and patterns for creating several different Visitor costumes, among others.

== Comics ==
DC Comics published an 18-issue V comic book series from February 1985 – July 1986, with stories set to be concurrent with the events of V: The Series. The editor of the comic reported at one point in the letter (fan mail) column that DC was working to acquire permission to continue the storyline of the television series should it not be renewed for a second season. In the end, either such permission was denied or DC decided not to pursue the matter further. The cover of the 18th issue did state "Final Issue", but actually featured (with issue 17) a flashback story featuring Elias Taylor. (Issue 16 led into the opening scene of the final television episode.)

In Japan, Go Nagai wrote a manga adaptation of the series with art by Tatsuya Yasuda.

== Computer game ==
V
- Developer: Ocean Software
- Publisher: Ocean Software
- Platforms: Amstrad CPC, Commodore 64, ZX Spectrum
- Release: 1986
- Genre: Action game
- Modes: Single-player, multiplayer

V is a video game based on the TV series of the same name. It was developed by Ocean Software. The programmer was Grant Harrison.

In the role of Mike Donovan, the player must infiltrate an alien mother-ship, destroy the craft, and escape alive. The opening scene is a docking bay, and the player's objectives are to spread the red dust to take out the alien visitors and to set 5 bombs in strategic locations to blow up the mother-ship. The player must solve many puzzles in order to progress and complete the game.

== Audio dramas ==
On December 23, 2024, Big Finish Productions announced a new radio drama adaptation of Kenneth Johnson's original scripts, with the action now moved to the United Kingdom. The first set of episodes, "V UK: Visitation", was released on January 23, 2025 and covers the arrival of the Visitors and the beginning of the human rebellion. The second set, "V UK: Occupation", is scheduled for release in August 2025. The series stars Jack Myers as Mike Donovan, Annabel Baldwin as Juliet Parrish, and Janie Dee as Diana.

Writer and producer Jonathan Morris commented:

Although "V - UK" has all the trappings of science fiction - motherships, aliens, laser guns - that's not what it's about. It is, pretty blatantly, an allegory for living life under occupation or under a fascist government.

That tyranny will gain power by offering simple solutions and by making scapegoats. And in that situation, you have to ask - what would I do? Would I join the resistance or would I keep my head down for the sake of a quiet life?

My goal, basically, was to make it feel close to home, uncomfortably so, because that's the power of the premise. It's not about aliens invading a distant world. It's about them marching down the street where you live. This is a story set in a world post-Brexit, post COVID-19, and some of the themes from the original miniseries - such as the vilification of scientists - are even more timely now.
