= Rape and Marriage: The Rideout Case =

- Genre: Drama
- Written by: Hesper Anderson
- Directed by: Peter Levin
- Starring: Mickey Rourke; Linda Hamilton
- Music by: Gil Mellé
- Country of origin: United States
- Original language: English

Production
- Executive producer: Dick Berg
- Producers: Blue André; Vanessa Greene
- Cinematography: Robert Caramico
- Editor: Howard Terrill
- Running time: 96 min.
- Production companies: Stonehenge Productions; Blue Greene Productions; Lorimar Television

Original release
- Network: CBS
- Release: October 30, 1980

Rape and Marriage: The Rideout Case is a 1980 American made-for-television drama film directed by Peter Levin and starring Mickey Rourke, Linda Hamilton and Rip Torn.

It is based on the true story of the trial of John Rideout, who was accused of raping his wife Greta in Oregon, 1978.

== Plot ==
John Rideout (Rourke) rapes his wife (Hamilton), claiming that it is his right as a husband. She says that it is rape. The case must be settled in court.

== Cast ==
- Mickey Rourke as John Rideout
- Linda Hamilton as Greta Rideout
- Rip Torn as Charles Burt
- Eugene Roche as Gary Gortmaker
- Conchata Ferrell as Helen
- Gail Strickland as Jean Christensen
- Bonnie Bartlett as Norma Joyce
- Richard Venture as Judge Richard Barber
- Alley Mills as Wanda
- Paul Koslo as Ralph Larson
- Mo Malone as Sally
- Gerald McRaney as Cliff Sulkes
- Camila Ashland as Jackie Godfrey
