= V The Second Generation =

2008 Kenneth Johnson novel

V: The Second Generation
- Cover
- Author: Kenneth Johnson
- Cover artist: Stephan Martiniere
- Language: English
- Series: V
- Genre: Science fiction
- Publisher: Tor Books
- Publication date: February 5, 2008
- Publication place: United States
- Media type: Print (Paperback)
- Pages: 443
- ISBN: 978-0-7653-1906-7
- Preceded by: V

V: The Second Generation is a novel written by American telewriter/producer Kenneth Johnson. It is an alternative sequel to his 1983 science fiction television miniseries V, which depicted an advanced race of carnivorous reptilians known as "The Visitors".

== Plot summary ==
Set 20 years after the original miniseries, The Second Generation depicts an Earth still under Visitor domination with the Resistance fighting a losing battle. They desperately try to persuade the masses that the Visitors are evil aliens bent on mankind's destruction. However, they are largely ignored as the many technological and social advancements brought by the Visitors to the planet have convinced the majority that the aliens have their best interests in mind. They are halfway to taking all of the planet's water under the guise of cleansing it of all polluting substances. Many people were also convinced to join the Visitors' civilian militia, the Teammates (an evolution of the miniseries' Visitor Youth), to hunt resistance members.

When all seems hopeless, the message that Resistance leader Juliet Parrish sent into space at the end of the original miniseries is finally heard. An alien race called the Zedti, who are long-standing enemies of the Visitors reinforces the Resistance in their time of need and soon the war is turned in their favor. However, all is not as it seems, as the Zedti's actions make the Resistance wonder about their newfound allies' actual motives.

== Background ==
In 2004, Kenneth Johnson announced plans to produce a sequel to the first V miniseries from 1983, which would disregard both The Final Battle mini-series (1984) and the subsequent weekly series (which had been made without Johnson's involvement). He made it known that NBC wanted a remake of the original V miniseries, rather than a sequel. In an interview with the Pittsburgh Post Gazette, he said the idea for a sequel was born during the production of the Original Mini-Series DVD in 2001, particularly while remastering the final scene where Julie Parrish and Elias Taylor send the distress signal.

In a press conference at the 2007 San Diego Comic-Con, Johnson revealed that the novel has been written and negotiations were taking place with NBC regarding the production of its film version, a four-hour TV movie. However, in 2008, Warner Bros., which holds the television rights to the V franchise, opted to remake V from scratch, with a script written by Scott Peters (co-creator of The 4400), thus ending Johnson's plans for The Second Generation being made for television. The pilot of the remake aired on ABC on November 3, 2009.
