= Blair Tefkin =

American actress and singer-songwriter

- Born: 1960 or 1961 (age 65–66); Los Angeles, California
- Occupations: Actress; singer-songwriter
- Years active: 1982–present

Blair Ashley Tefkin (born 1960 or 1961) is an American actress, singer, and songwriter.

== Early years ==
Blair Ashley Tefkin was born in Los Angeles, California. She began acting when she was 5 years old and was billed in her early years as Blair Ashley.

== Career ==
Tefkin is best known for her role as Robin Maxwell on the 1983 science fiction miniseries V (replacing Dominique Dunne, who was murdered while the show was in pre-production), the 1984 sequel V: The Final Battle, and V: The Series. Other notable television roles include Chris Elliott's love interest, Charlene, on Get a Life. Blair co-starred with Martin Mull on the CBS sitcom, His & Hers.

Film roles include Pat Bernardo in Fast Times at Ridgemont High (credited as Blair Ashleigh), Three for the Road with Charlie Sheen, A Sinful Life, Inside Monkey Zetterland, Fright Night Part 2, S.F.W., and Dream Lover with James Spader. In The Anniversary Party with Jennifer Jason Leigh and Alan Cumming, Tefkin also performs an original song, "If Your Love Is True". Her song, "Troubles" appears on the movie's soundtrack as well. In 2010 she played opposite Ben Stiller in Noah Baumbach's Greenberg.

Blair was a member of The Sunday Company at L.A.’s renowned improv theatre, The Groundlings where she also starred in the hit play Just Like The Pom Pom Girls for which she won both L.A. Weekly and Dramalogue awards.

As a songwriter, Tefkin was signed to a publishing and development deal with PolyGram Publishing in 1996 and formed the indie band Lucie Gamelon, in which she sang and played bass. Lucie Gamelon released a six-song EP: Everything Is Nice, In 2001, Tefkin released her solo CD Shocked and Devastated.

In 2004, Tefkin performed her one-woman show In the Land of the Giants: A Tragicomedy With Music at the Blank Theatre in Hollywood which the L.A. Times described as "witty, poignant and often hilarious."
