= Thomas Hill (actor) =

American actor

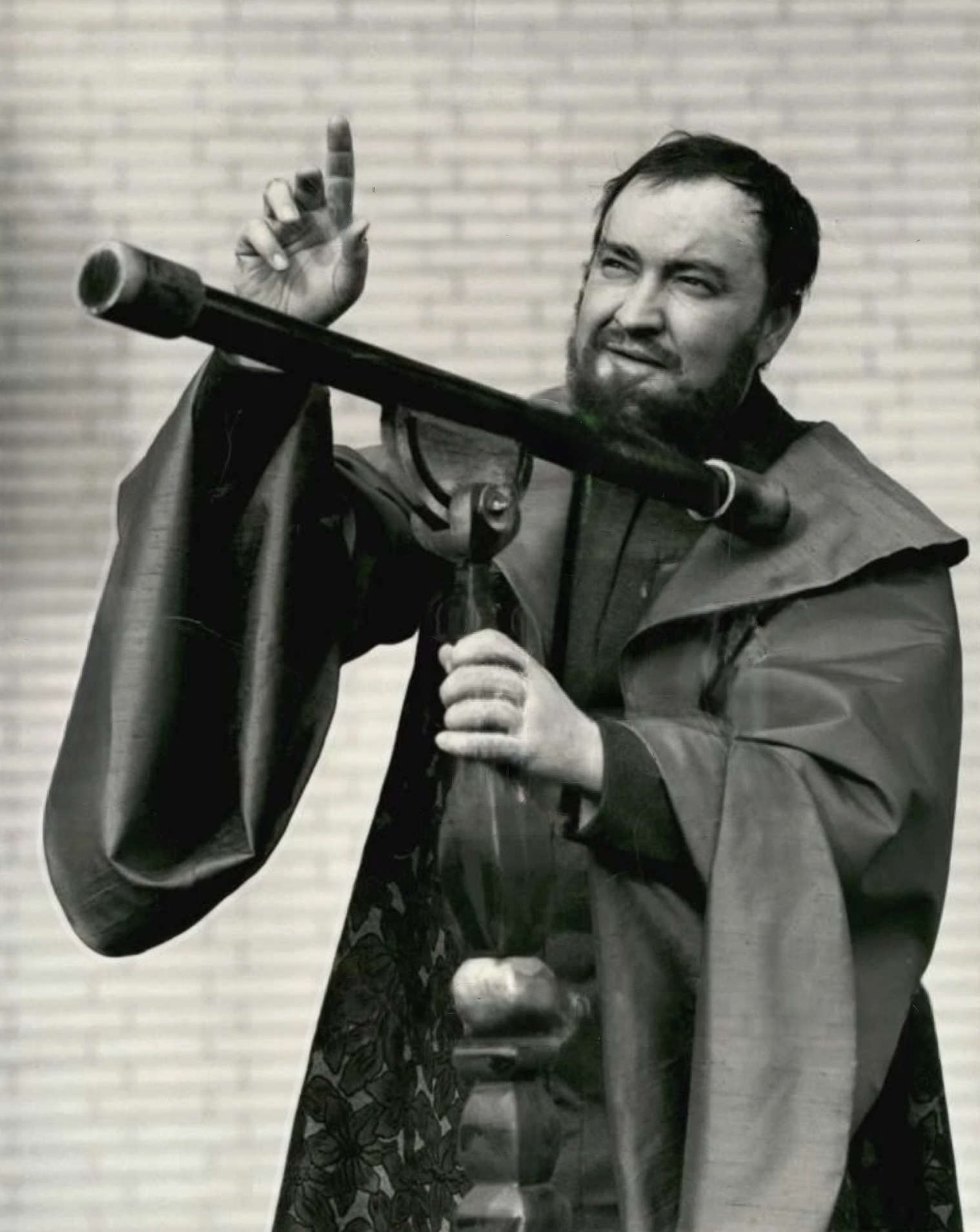
- Hill in 1966
- Born: Thomas Newton Hill Jr. June 2, 1927; Landour, Mussoorie, India
- Died: April 20, 2009 (aged 81); Bloomington, Indiana, U.S.
- Occupations: Actor, director
- Years active: 1965–1993
- Notable work: Koreander in The NeverEnding Story; Father Andrew Doyle in V: The Final Battle

Thomas Newton Hill Jr. (June 2, 1927 – April 20, 2009) was an Indian-born American character actor and director on stage for decades before starting in film in the mid-1960s and on television in the 1980s.

== Early life ==
Thomas Newton Hill Jr. was born in India in 1927, to Disciples of Christ missionaries Thomas Newton Hill Sr. and Elma Alexander Hill. Thomas Jr. attended Woodstock School until 1940 when he was 13; he and his parents moved to Fort Wayne, Indiana. Then, he attended and graduated from Richmond High School, in Richmond, IN.

== Career ==
Hill began his theatrical career in the early 1950s on Broadway and in television. For four decades, he was a major force in American theatre. He performed almost three hundred roles at theaters across America, including The Cleveland Playhouse, Seattle Repertory Theatre, and The Public Theatre in New York. He also directed hundreds of productions and was founding director of The American Theatre Company in Portland, Oregon, where he later began The Storefront Theatre.

Hill's first feature film performance was in the 1965 film The Slender Thread. Other film credits include The Postman Always Rings Twice (1981), Firefox (1982), and as the bookstore owner Mr. Coreander in The NeverEnding Story and its first sequel.

One of Hill's most prominent recurring roles was as the zany sidekick Jim Dixon on the 1980s TV series Newhart. Hill appeared as King Baaldorf in the short-lived 1980s fantasy TV series Wizards and Warriors.

His TV movie roles include Father Andrew Doyle in the 1984 NBC miniseries V: The Final Battle. He had guest appearances on such shows as St. Elsewhere, Remington Steele, The Facts of Life, Married... with Children, Coach, and Law & Order.

== Personal life ==
In 2003, Hill retired to Bloomington, Indiana. He died from a heart attack on April 20, 2009, at age 81.

== Filmography ==
Year	Title	Role	Notes
1965	The Slender Thread	Liquor Salesman	
1971	McCabe & Mrs. Miller	Archer	
1979	Quintet	Francha	
1980	Hide in Plain Sight	Bobby Momisa	
1980	The Nude Bomb	The President	
1981	The Postman Always Rings Twice	Barlow	
1981	True Confessions	Mr. Fazenda	
1982	Firefox	General Brown	
1982–1990	Newhart	Jim Dixon	
1984	The NeverEnding Story	Carl Conrad Coreander	
1984	V: The Final Battle	Father Andrew Doyle	3 episodes
1984	Cat on a Hot Tin Roof	Dr. Baugh	TV movie
1987	Black Widow	Attorney	
1990	The NeverEnding Story II: The Next Chapter	Carl Conrad Coreander	
1990	An Empty Bed	Elmer	
