= Neva Patterson =

American actress (1920–2010)

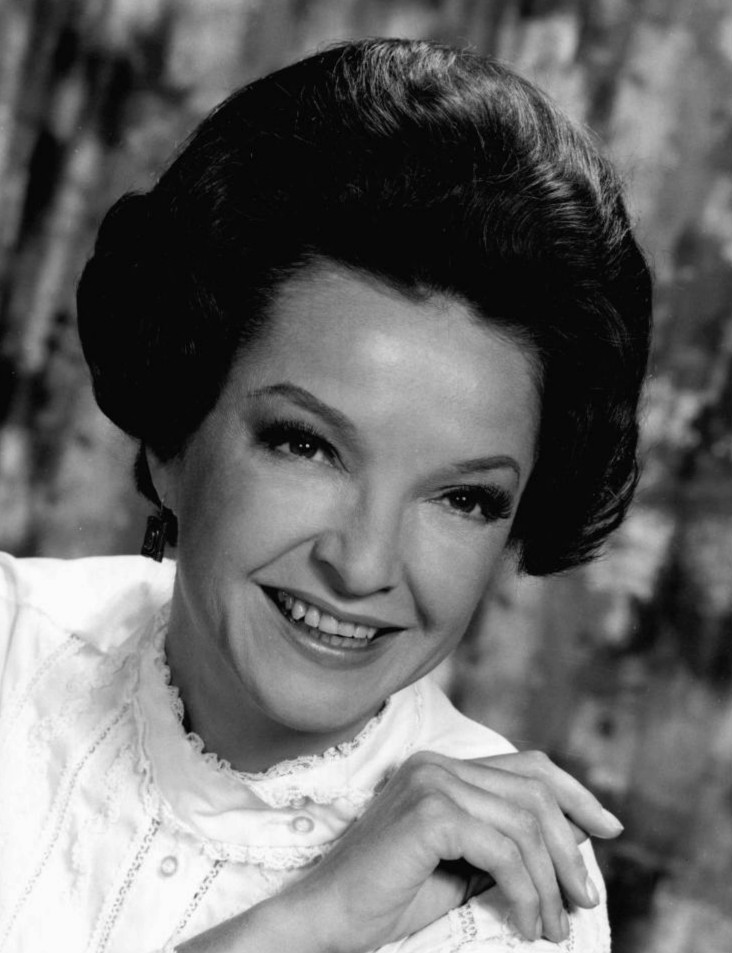
- Patterson in 1969
- Born: February 10, 1920; Near Nevada, Iowa, U.S.
- Died: December 14, 2010 (aged 90); Los Angeles, California, U.S.
- Occupation: Actress
- Years active: 1949–1992
- Spouses: Thomas Gallagher (m. unknown date; div. 1948); Michael Ellis March (m. 1953; div. 1956) James Lee (m. 1957; died 2002)
- Children: 2

Neva Louise Patterson (February 10, 1920 – December 14, 2010) was an American actress.

== Early years ==
Born on a farm near Nevada, Iowa, Patterson was the daughter of mailman George Patterson and seamstress Marjorie Byers Patterson. After graduating from Nevada High School in 1937, she worked as a secretary in Des Moines before she moved to New York in 1938 and initially worked as a secretary there.

== Career ==
Early in her career, Patterson acted on radio in Chicago and sang for dance bands.

She made her Broadway debut in 1947's The Druid Circle. Her work on Broadway also included Strange Bedfellows (1948), The Ivy Green (1949), I Know My Love (1949), Ring Round the Moon (1950), The Long Days (1951), Lace on Her Petticoat (1951), The Seven Year Itch (1952, in which she played Helen Sherman), Double in Hearts (1956), Speaking of Murder (1956), Make a Million (1958), and Romantic Comedy (1979).

Her first feature movie was Taxi (1953). Other film credits include The Buddy Holly Story, All of Me (1984), and An Affair to Remember (1957). Also in 1957, she played the beleaguered Miss Warriner in Desk Set.

Patterson portrayed Ma Ketchum in Nichols, Maggie McCloud in The Governor & J.J., Ilene in the NBC drama Berringer's, and Margaret Brimble in Doc Elliott on ABC. She also hosted the game show Manhattan Honeymoon on ABC. Her other television credits included Cagney and Lacey, in which she played Muriel Lacey, and as Eleanor Dupres in V, which she reprised in V: The Final Battle. She made guest appearances on Appointment with Adventure, New Comedy Showcase, The Defenders, Ben Casey, Maude, Family, Ironside, Charlie's Angels, S.W.A.T., Barnaby Jones, The Dukes of Hazzard, The Waltons, The Rockford Files, In the Heat of the Night and St. Elsewhere.

== Personal life ==
Patterson initially married Thomas Gallagher, and they divorced in 1948. On March 22, 1953, she married Michael Ellis March; they divorced in 1956. She married James Lee on September 15, 1957, and they remained wed until he died in 2002.

== Death ==
On December 14, 2010, Patterson died from complications from a broken hip at age 90.

== Filmography ==
- Taxi (1953) - Miss Millard
- The Solid Gold Cadillac (1956) - Amelia Shotgraven
- Desk Set (1957) - Miss Warriner
- An Affair to Remember (1957) - Lois Clark
- Too Much, Too Soon (1958) - Blanche Oehrichs a.k.a. Michael Strange
- The Spiral Road (1962) - Louise Kramer
- David and Lisa (1962) - Mrs. Clemens
- Dear Heart (1964) - Connie Templeton
- Counterpoint (1968) - Dorothy
- Skin Game (1971) - Mrs. Claggart
- The Rockford Files (1975 TV series, S1 E24 "Just By Accident") Louise Hartman
- All The President's Men (1976) - CRP Woman
- The Domino Principle (1977) - Gaddis
- The Buddy Holly Story (1978) - Mrs. Ella Holly
- Star 80 (1983) - Playboy Executive
- V (1983, TV Mini-Series) - Eleanor Dupres
- V: The Final Battle (1984, TV Mini-Series) - Eleanor Dupres
- All of Me (1984) - Gretchen
