= V (1984 TV series) =

American science fiction television series (1984–1985)

- Genre: Science fiction
- Created by: Kenneth Johnson
- Starring: Marc Singer; Faye Grant; Jane Badler; Lane Smith; Blair Tefkin; Jennifer Cooke; Michael Ironside; Michael Wright; Robert Englund; Jeff Yagher; June Chadwick
- Composer: Dennis McCarthy
- Country of origin: United States
- Original language: English
- No. of seasons: 1
- No. of episodes: 19 (+1 unfilmed)

Production
- Executive producers: Daniel H. Blatt; Robert Singer
- Producers: Dean O'Brien; Skip Ward
- Running time: 47 minutes
- Production companies: Daniel H. Blatt-Robert Singer Productions; Warner Bros. Television

Original release
- Network: NBC
- Release: October 26, 1984 – March 22, 1985

Related
- V (1983 miniseries); V: The Final Battle; V (2009 TV series)

V (also known as V: The Series) is an American science fiction television series that aired in the United States on NBC from October 26, 1984, to March 22, 1985. It is a continuation of the V franchise about an alien invasion of Earth by a carnivorous race of reptilians known as "Visitors", which was conceived by American writer, producer, and director Kenneth Johnson. Johnson, however, was not involved in the production of the weekly series.

== Plot ==
Following directly on from the events of the miniseries V: The Final Battle, the alien Diana escapes from her captured mothership in a shuttle, but is pursued by resistance member Mike Donovan. After a short fight, Donovan captures her.

One year after the day that the Red Dust was deployed, now the international holiday called "Liberation Day", the former members of the Resistance and their Fifth Column allies have gone their separate ways and are each looking forward to prosperous careers and bright futures. As Diana is about to be put on trial for the atrocities she committed during the First Invasion, the company responsible for mass production of the Red Dust, Science Frontiers, has her abducted and taken to a secret cabin in the woods outside Los Angeles, where the company's CEO, Nathan Bates, offers Diana better accommodations in exchange for providing him with access to alien technology.

Donovan and Martin, meanwhile, pursue Nathan's agents in a stolen helicopter. After reaching the cabin, Donovan is knocked unconscious by Martin, who wants Diana dead. Before Martin can kill her, Diana is able to overpower him, stealing his pistol. She forces him to surrender his last antidote pill so she can temporarily survive on Earth and then shoots him, enabling her escape to the Southwest Tracking Station.

Martin tells Donovan about Diana's plan to contact the Visitor Fleet moments before his death, and Donovan sets off after her on foot. Donovan meets Ham Tyler, on Bates' payroll, and the two agree to pursue Diana together. Their attempts to stop her fail, and Diana escapes to a shuttle sent by a Visitor fleet hidden behind the Moon. Diana takes command and launches a full-scale invasion of Earth. She learns that the Red Dust bacterium needs freezing temperatures to regenerate, meaning that Visitor troops can safely attack Los Angeles and other cities in warmer climates.

The Resistance assembles once more, now fighting the Visitors nationwide and also contending with the power-hungry Bates, who has used the power vacuum left behind by the collapse of the government to become governor of Los Angeles, declared an open city to both sides. The Resistance fights however it can, often joined by other rebel groups. Although 50% of the Earth is still protected from The Visitors by the Red Dust, the Resistance cannot use any more of it due to the toxic long-term effects it will have on the environment. Meanwhile, Elizabeth, who has transformed yet again and now looks like a young adult, becomes increasingly important in the cause for Earth's freedom, eventually controlling the destiny of both races and deciding the outcome of the conflict.

== Cast and characters ==
Many of the cast from the original miniseries and V: The Final Battle reprised their role in the weekly series. The only character to be played by a different actor was Sean Donovan (Nicky Katt replaced Eric Johnston in the role).

=== Main cast ===
- Jane Badler as Diana – Supreme Commander of the Visitors
- Marc Singer as Mike Donovan – Co-Leader of the Resistance (former TV cameraman)
- Faye Grant as Juliet Parrish (episodes 1-15; 18-19) – Founder of the Resistance (former medical student)
- Robert Englund as Willie – Visitor Resistance member
- June Chadwick as Lydia (episodes 2–8; 10-19) – Fleet security officer sent by the Leader to Earth to commence the second invasion, she resents Diana's disobedience of command.
- Michael Wright as Elias Taylor (episodes 1–11) – A now semi-retired Resistance member, Elias runs the Club Creole restaurant, which becomes the informal headquarters of the Resistance.
- Lane Smith as Nathan Bates (episodes 1–13) – CEO of biotech company Science Frontiers, which mass-produced the Red Dust toxin.
- Jeff Yagher as Kyle Bates (episodes 3–19) – The disowned rebel son of Nathan Bates, Kyle joins the Resistance, eventually becoming one of its leaders.
- Michael Ironside as Ham Tyler (episodes 1–12) – A former CIA agent and Resistance hitman, he is actually in the employ of Nathan Bates as a hitman when the series begins.
- Jennifer Cooke as the post-metamorphosis Elizabeth (episode 2–19) – She searches for her mother, Robin.
- Blair Tefkin as Robin Maxwell (episodes 1–12) – Elizabeth's mother.

=== Supporting cast ===
The following cast appear in multiple episodes:

- Frank Ashmore as Martin and twin brother Philip (episodes 1; 14–19) – A Fifth Column leader and friend of Mike.
- Aki Aleong as Mr. Chiang (episodes 5–12) – A henchman of Nathan Bates, Chiang is tasked mainly with tracking Kyle.
- Mickey Jones as Chris Farber (episodes 9-11) – Best friend of Ham Tyler, he continues to aid the Resistance.
- Jenny Beck as young Elizabeth, the Starchild (episode 1,2,4,9) – She retreats into a cocoon by the end of the first episode to undergo metamorphosis.
- Michael Durrell as Robert Maxwell (episodes 1–2) – The scientist father of Robin and grandfather of Elizabeth.
- Duncan Regehr as Charles (episodes 10–13) – Personal envoy of the Leader and a member of the Royal House of Raman.
- Peter Elbling as Oswald (episodes 15; 17–18) – Visitor underling of Diana, he is a mortician and an interior decorator.
- Judson Scott as Lieutenant James (episodes 11–19) – Visitor Lieutenant with ambitious goals.
- Nicky Katt as Sean Donovan (episodes 4,5) – The son of Mike Donovan, previously converted by Diana and released as a spy in the Resistance.
- Howard K. Smith as himself (episodes 3–13) – Smith appeared briefly at beginning of several episodes playing a newscaster (his former real-life profession) describing recent (off-camera) actions by the Visitors and the Resistance, sometimes providing expositional background for events in that night's episode. He did not interact with any of the other characters.

== Intro ==
The title sequence for Episodes 1–13 featured theme music derived from incidental music previously used in The Final Battle over the main cast credits.

With Episode 14, a new intro was introduced with Michael Ironside, Lane Smith, Blair Tefkin and Michael Wright removed from the credits along with different theme music and a new monologue describing the premise of the show:

They arrived in 50 motherships offering their friendship and advanced technology to Earth. Skeptical of the Visitors, Mike Donovan and Juliet Parrish infiltrated their ranks and soon discovered some startling secrets.

Juliet Parrish: They're shipping food!

The Resistance is all that stands between us and the Visitors.

== Episodes ==
No.	Title	Directed by	Written by	Original release date
1	"Liberation Day"	Paul Krasny	Paul Monash	October 26, 1984
The first anniversary of the day the aliens were defeated could lead to Earth's last day: alien commander Diana escapes and reunites with her fleet. Diana kills Martin in order to get his supply of the red dust antidote. The Starchild undergoes a strange metamorphosis.
2	"Dreadnought"	Paul Krasny	Steven E. de Souza	November 2, 1984
Diana talks peace while readying the fearsome Triax superweapon that could reduce Los Angeles to rubble. Meanwhile, Resistance fighters activate a new weapon of their own: a captured mothership. Robert Maxwell is killed when he collides the mothership into the Triax in order to destroy it.
3	"Breakout"	Ray Austin	David Braff	May 24, 1985
Combatants held in a Visitor work camp face the flesh-consuming alien monster that guards the camp. Hunters of the 5-year old Starchild are unaware she has morphed into a fully grown woman. Note: This episode was rejected by NBC in the series' first run because of its violence. It was, however, shown during the reruns and was included in VHS and DVD releases. However, because of the switch in original order, this episode has continuity errors when watched in the originally intended order. For example, while Ham meets Kyle for the first time in this episode, he then meets him again for the first time in the next episode. Robin meets up with the group during this episode, but is once again alone searching for help at the beginning of the next episode. There are several other minor plot inconsistencies.
4	"The Deception"	Victor Lobl	Garner Simmons	November 9, 1984
Mike awakens to an ideal family life in a world where the Earth has triumphed; however, this life is part of an alien holographic ruse aimed at gathering information about the Starchild Elizabeth.
5	"The Sanction"	Bruce Seth Green	Brian Taggert	November 16, 1984
The top pupil at the visitor Youth Corps is Mike's missing son Sean. Standing in the way of his rescue are a fearsome alien and the boy's conflicted allegiance. Meanwhile, Elizabeth, who is now an adult woman after days previously resembling a ten-year-old, reunites with her mother Robin, who has not seen her since her metamorphosis.
6	"Visitor's Choice"	Gilbert M. Shilton	David Braff	November 23, 1984
Bates imposes a curfew in the open city of Los Angeles in an attempt to curb resistance activity; Donovan and Ham make plans to hit a Visitors' conference.
7	"The Overlord"	Bruce Seth Green	David Abramowitz	November 30, 1984
A citizen who rallies the Resistance to aid a downtrodden mining community has a dangerous secret agenda. Julie faces allegations of treason.
8	"The Dissident"	Walter Grauman	Paul F. Edwards	December 14, 1984
When the Visitors place a force field around Los Angeles, the Resistance captures its creator as part of a plan to shut it down.
9	"Reflections in Terror"	Kevin Hooks	Chris Manheim	December 21, 1984
Bates's trickery signals destruction for the Resistance headquarters. Diana uses a blood sample to generate a deadly clone of Elizabeth, which escapes.
10	"The Conversion"	Gilbert M. Shilton	Brian Taggert	January 4, 1985
After Ham and Kyle are captured, the Leader's envoy Charles programs Ham with a new conversion technique to kill Donovan during a prisoner exchange.
11	"The Hero"	Kevin Hooks	Carleton Eastlake	January 11, 1985
Bates's police arrest Resistance sympathizers, including Robin, and threaten to execute a prisoner a day until Rebel leaders surrender. Elias is killed by a death ray trying to rescue Robin.
12	"The Betrayal"	Gilbert M. Shilton	Mark Rosner	January 18, 1985
Rebels abduct an alien medical student to treat a gravely wounded Willie; Charles plots to overthrow the comatose Nathan Bates.
13	"The Rescue"	Kevin Hooks	Garner Simmons	February 1, 1985
Charles forces Diana to marry him, knowing that alien law requires her to return home to bear his offspring. She is visibly unhappy with the arrangement, but follows through under duress. Lydia is divided in her opinion, while she is happy Diana will be leaving, because of her feelings for Charles, she is also disappointed that he has chosen Diana over her. The Resistance crumbles under heavy fire in Los Angeles, headed by Diana's favoured Lieutenant, James. Julie risks her life to assist with the delivery of a baby to an old friend of hers and his heavily pregnant wife. The birth is a success. Unable to prevent the wedding, Diana is officially wedded to Charles. Lydia in a final desperate attempt to be with Charles, poisons Diana's chalice. In their private quarters Charles and Diana drink together in celebration, with Diana suggesting that Charles "takes her cup" just as he "takes her". They each drink from the other's cup and Charles is poisoned and dies. Lydia enters and is horrified to discover what has happened and Diana orders Lydia's immediate arrest for wanton murder.
14	"The Champion"	Cliff Bole	Paul F. Edwards	February 8, 1985
In the aftermath of Charles' murder, Lydia is sentenced to death in a rapid trial headed by Diana. Inspector General Philip (Martin's twin brother) later arrives and commutes Lydia's sentence due to lack of evidence, considering the possibility that the actual killer may have been Diana (who had handed Charles the poisoned cup). Since Lydia's intended target was actually Diana, the only accuser of the crime, the two women put on body armor and pick up laser weapons in preparation for a ritual battle to the death. Lydia is victorious in the battle, but before she can perform the death blow, Philip halts the proceedings. Mike and Kyle befriend a local resistance force headed by Kathy Courtney. Mike promises Kathy's daughter, Jesse, that he will return to visit them when the war is over. Meanwhile, Philip mentions that another set of fingerprints was found on the bottle of poison. Until the case is fully investigated, Lydia and Diana must look after one another. Should any grievous harm occur to one of them, the other will be automatically accused of Charles' murder. New opening credits were introduced in this episode.
15	"The Wildcats"	John Florea	David Braff	February 15, 1985
Rivals become scheming allies when Diana and Lydia learn that if the commander's murderer is not found, Visitor law requires that all suspects be buried with him. Eventually, evidence is fabricated and the crime is blamed on Marta, a Visitor pharmacist. Meanwhile, a street gang assists the Resistance.
16	"The Littlest Dragon"	Cliff Bole	David Abramowitz	February 22, 1985
Mike and Kyle come to the rescue of two Fifth Column fugitives, Robert, and his pregnant wife, Glenda (Wendy Fulton), who have survived Diana's purge of the Fifth Column's agents, and escaped from the mothership after Robert sabotaged the proposed mission to kill several Resistance operatives with a hidden explosive device and stole the borellium crystals that powered the LA Mothership's laser cannons. Diana sends out a cadet, Angela, to capture Mike and kill the renegade couple, while Philip follows her. Meanwhile, when the fugitive couple take shelter at a warehouse, Glenda gives birth to an egg hatched into her new baby son, whom Mike and Kyle manage to safely deliver for her. Donovan and Bates succeed in repelling Visitor attackers and Philip, who is revealed to be a leader within the Fifth Column. Angela attempts to kill him but is finally shot down by Glenda.
17	"War of Illusions"	Earl Bellamy	John Simmons	March 8, 1985
A teenaged computer whiz Henry Atkins (Josh Richman) hacks into and disrupts the Visitors' sophisticated new Battlesphere system, but he insists that the Resistance first rescue his father Dr. David Atkins (Conrad Janis) from alien captivity.
18	"The Secret Underground"	Cliff Bole	Teleplay by : David Braff & Colley Cibber; Story by : David Abramowitz & Donald R. Boyle	March 15, 1985
A computerized list of Fifth Columnists has been taken by James, prompting one of them to steal the disk and escape. He is shot and stumbles his way into a hall where the Visitors are preparing for their celebration of Ramalon. This prompts Donovan and Julie to pose as collaborators, go aboard the Mothership, and retrieve the disk.
19	"The Return"	John Florea	Teleplay by : David Abramowitz & Donald R. Boyle; Story by : David Braff & Colley Cibber	March 22, 1985
The Visitors make a worldwide ceasefire, and a majority are retreating from Earth. The Leader is coming to Earth to negotiate peace and has asked Elizabeth and the Resistance to come to the Mothership. Diana and James decide to extend the war by arming the energy swords of Phillip and Donovan during a supposedly non-lethal duel. When this attempt fails, Diana blackmails James into attempting to assassinate the Leader by having his troops blow up the Leader's shuttle. When the destroyed shuttle is revealed as a decoy, Diana stages a coup and attempts to self-destruct the fusion reactors of the Mothership in order to kill everyone aboard and destroy Earth. However, the Leader, working through Elizabeth telepathically, manages to stop the self-destruct. After Diana and James are captured, Elizabeth boards the Leader's arriving shuttle to return to the Visitor home world and guarantee peace. Unbeknownst to everyone, Kyle also stows away on that shuttle, which has a "going-away present" from Diana aboard.
20	"The Attack"	TBD	David Braff & Paul F. Edward	partially filmed
The intended conclusion for the season. Kyle is transported by Elizabeth to an alternate dimension where he sees her and The Leader, a massive four armed Visitor. Elizabeth explains that, in the distant past, the rulers of "Saurus" feared that one of their group would become too strong and thus broke "The Anyx", which was the source of their power. Part of the Anyx had been hidden on Earth. Donovan and Julie make contact with Ham with the intent of renewing his search for Sean. Meanwhile, Diana escapes, and the Leader's shuttle is destroyed, but is revealed to have been a decoy. Julie is killed as the Resistance, while Elizabeth refuses to rule at The Leader's side and rejoins her friends. They return to Earth and are reunited with Ham, who meets them in a Road Warrior styled vehicle. The remaining Resistance fighters hit the road, with Season 2's focus to be the search for the missing piece of the Anyx. Production of this episode ceased when the series was cancelled.

=== Aftermath ===
Although the show had been cancelled in March 1985, the sets from the production remained in storage for some time as discussions transpired over rendering a conclusion to the V saga. Among the options explored were a stand-alone TV movie or a final miniseries. Several scenarios were discussed:

- The Resistance goes to the Visitor homeworld and attempt to stop Diana from assassinating the Leader
- An exploration of the aftermath of the peace treaty in "The Return". A hardline US government would impose harsh conditions on the Visitors who choose to remain behind after their race departed, leaving the Resistance to ally with them

In 1989, a proposed sequel series by J. Michael Straczynski entitled V: The Next Chapter would have followed up five years after the conclusion of the original show. Ham Tyler would have been the only character to have returned, and the show would have taken place in Chicago. The rest of the remaining cast had been temporarily or permanently written off, with Mike Donovan captured, Willie executed, Lydia assassinated, Julie living in exile in Australia, Diana reassigned, and Elizabeth having died. Warner Brothers ultimately passed on the project.

== Reception ==
In the Nielsen ratings, V's premiere episode ranked 36th for the week, with a 15.4/26 rating/share. By episode 13, it had slipped to 53rd place. For the season, V finished ranked 57th out of 77 shows, with a 12.8/20 rating/share.

On Rotten Tomatoes, V has an aggregate score of 67% based on 16 positive and 8 negative critic reviews. The website’s consensus reads: "Indefinitely postponing the apocalypse, V fully sheds its original self-seriousness—along with much of its production value -- and settles into solid camp." The St. Louis Post-Dispatch wrote: "... a TV series with so much promise – based on two successful, highly rated science fiction miniseries on NBC in the early 1980s – produced such a silly, loathsome mess ... NBC tried to make a weekly series out of [the miniseries that unraveled] the show so terribly it must surely rank as one of the worst TV sci-fi experiments ever. The cast becomes dangerously unstable. Ironside quits in the middle of the show's run with no apparent reason. Others are killed without meaning. The special effects are cheapened and the use of stock footage – previously filmed scenes used again and again – is maddening. (At one point, they actually used stock footage from the previous week's episode.) ... What was once a pretty decent science fiction saga with good drama, humor and suspense ends up becoming 'Dynasty' with lizard makeup and laser guns. There's even an episode in which Diana marries her alien boss named (what else?) Charles."

== Production notes ==
- Despite the high budget, producers had only half the resources given to the production of V: The Final Battle. Executive Story Consultant David Ambromowitz stated, "The budget for the miniseries was about double what we had per hour, so that's what was really difficult. It's impossible to retain the quality of the show with half the money, half the time to shoot things, half the special effects, half the sets, half the characters and half of everything."
- Liberation Day's shot of the alien fleet hiding behind the Moon was achieved using models (the 30-inch Saucer in the foreground, newly built smaller ships behind and a 36-inch model of the Moon's surface) as the budget was insufficient for optical compositing.
- The TV series' single season was released on LaserDisc in Japan in April 1989 (bilingual English/Japanese with subtitles) as a 10-disc box set, which included a "Diana Special" (in Japanese only) on side 20. It was later issued on Region 1 DVD in 2004, and Region 2 in 2008.
- The weekly series reused a lot of action footage from the miniseries. This was especially evident in the Visitor skyfighter chase scene in the pilot episode, where nearly all external shots were lifted from the climax scene of the original miniseries.
- In the original miniseries and The Final Battle, the Visitors' voices were given, among other post-processing, a pitch shift effect. This was dropped from the weekly series, though no explanation was given as to why the Visitors now sounded like humans.

== Comic book ==
DC Comics published 18 issues of a V comic book concurrently with the TV series.

== Toys and collectibles ==
A 1985 LJN toy line dedicated to the V series was to have been produced; however, a March 24, 1985 UPI article on the risks of toy franchising cited that the V line was "not presently in production".

== Awards and nominations ==
Year	Association	Category	Result
1985	37th Primetime Emmy Awards	Outstanding Achievement in Makeup	Nominated
