= V (1983 miniseries) =

American science-fiction television miniseries

- 2001 DVD cover
- Genre: Science fiction
- Written by: Kenneth Johnson
- Directed by: Kenneth Johnson
- Starring: Jane Badler; Frank Ashmore; Bonnie Bartlett; Diane Cary; Michael Durrell; Robert Englund; Faye Grant; Richard Herd; Richard Lawson; Peter Nelson; David Packer; Neva Patterson; Andrew Prine; Marc Singer; Jenny Sullivan; Blair Tefkin; Penelope Windust; Michael Wright
- Theme music composer: Joe Harnell
- Country of origin: United States
- Original language: English
- No. of episodes: 2

Production
- Executive producers: Kenneth Johnson; Brandon Tartikoff
- Producer: Chuck Bowman
- Cinematography: John McPherson
- Editors: Paul Dixon; Alan C. Marks; Robert K. Richard; Jack W. Schoengarth
- Running time: 190 minutes (total)
- Production companies: Kenneth Johnson Productions; Warner Bros. Television

Original release
- Network: NBC
- Release: May 1 – May 2, 1983

Related
- V: The Final Battle; V: The Second Generation (novel)

V (or V: The Original Miniseries) is a two-part 1983 American science-fiction television miniseries, written and directed by Kenneth Johnson. Its debut on NBC in 1983 initiated the science-fiction franchise concerning reptilian aliens known as the Visitors trying to gain control of Earth, and of the reaction by the human populace.

== Plot ==
A race of aliens arrives on Earth in a fleet of 50 huge, saucer-shaped motherships, which hover over major cities across the world. They reveal themselves on the roof of the United Nations building in New York City, appearing human, but requiring special glasses to protect their eyes and having a distinctive resonance to their voices. Referred to as the Visitors, they reach out in friendship, ostensibly seeking the help of humans to obtain chemicals and minerals needed to aid their ailing world, which is revealed to be a planet orbiting the star Sirius. In return, the Visitors promise to share their advanced technology with humanity. The governments of Earth accept the arrangement, and the Visitors, commanded by their leader John and his deputy Diana, begin to gain considerable influence with human authorities.

Strange events begin to occur. Scientists in particular become the objects of increasing media and public hostility. They experience government restrictions on their activities and movements. Others, particularly those keen on examining the Visitors more closely, begin to disappear or are discredited. Noted scientists confess to subversive activities; some of them exhibit other unusual behaviors, such as suddenly demonstrating hand preference opposite to the one they were known to have.

Television journalist cameraman Michael Donovan covertly boards one of the motherships of the Visitors. Donovan discovers their human-like façade of a thin, synthetic skin and human-eye contact lenses, and that the aliens are carnivorous reptilian humanoids with horned foreheads and green, scaly skin. He witnesses them eating whole live animals such as rodents and birds. Donovan, who first took footage of one of the alien ships flying overhead while on duty in El Salvador, records some of his findings on videotape and escapes from the mothership with the evidence. However, just as the exposé is about to air on television, the broadcast is interrupted by the Visitors, who have taken control of the media. Their announcement makes Donovan and his close friend and assistant Tony fugitives pursued by both the police and the Visitors.

Scientists around the world continue to be persecuted, both to discredit them (as the part of the human population most likely to discover the Visitors' secrets) and to distract the rest of the population with a scapegoat to whom they can attribute their fears. Key human individuals are subjected to Diana's special mind-control process called "conversion", which turns them into the Visitors' pawns, leaving only subtle behavioral clues to this manipulation. Others become subjects of Diana's horrifying biological experiments.

Some humans (including Mike Donovan's mother, Eleanor Dupres) willingly collaborate with the Visitors, seduced by their power. Daniel Bernstein, a grandson of a Jewish Holocaust survivor, joins the Visitor Youth and reveals the location of a scientist family, his neighbors the Maxwells, to the alien cause. One teenager, Robin Maxwell, the daughter of a well-known scientist who went into hiding, is seduced by a male Visitor named Brian, who impregnates her as one of Diana's "medical experiments".

A resistance movement is formed, determined to expose and oppose the Visitors. The Los Angeles cell leader is Julie Parrish, a biologist. Donovan later joins the group, and again sneaking aboard a mothership in search of Tony, who was captured, he learns from a Visitor named Martin that the story about the Visitors needing waste chemicals is a cover for a darker mission. The true purpose of the Visitors is to conquer and subdue the planet, steal all of the Earth's water, and harvest the human race as food, leaving only a few as slaves and cannon fodder for the Visitors' wars with other alien races. Martin is one of many dissidents among the Visitors (later known as the Fifth Column) who oppose their leader's plans and would rather co-exist peacefully with the humans. Martin then reveals to Donovan that Tony is dead, a victim of Diana's monstrous experiments. Afterwards, he befriends Donovan and promises to aid the Resistance. He gives Donovan access to one of their sky-fighter ships, which he quickly learns how to pilot. He escapes from the mothership along with Robin and another prisoner named Sancho, who had aided Robin's family in their flight out of occupied Los Angeles.

The Resistance strikes its first blows against the Visitors, procuring laboratory equipment and modern military weapons from National Guard armories to carry on the fight. The symbol of the Resistance is a blood-red letter V (for victory), spray-painted over posters promoting Visitor friendship among humans. The symbol was inspired by Stanly Bernstein's father Abraham, a Holocaust survivor.

The miniseries ends with the Visitors now virtually controlling the Earth, and Julie and Elias sending a transmission into space to ask other alien races for help in defeating the occupiers.

== Historical references ==
With the Visitors' swastika-like emblem, their SS-like uniforms, and their German Luger-like laser weapons, the miniseries became an allegory of Nazism. A youth auxiliary movement called the "Friends of the Visitors" has similarities to the Hitler Youth, and the Visitors' attempts to co-opt television news reporters suggests the Nazi-era propagandization of news through the film industry. The human interaction with the Visitors resembles occupied Europe during World War II, with some citizens choosing collaboration while others join underground resistance movements. Where the Nazis persecuted primarily Jews, the Visitors persecute scientists, their families, and anyone associating with them. As the Visitors start eliminating scientists who could reveal their true nature, a Jewish family hesitates on whether to help their scientist neighbor and his family, until their grandfather suggests that to do otherwise would mean they had not learned anything from the past.

== Production ==
V was inspired by Sinclair Lewis's antifascist novel It Can't Happen Here (1935). Director–producer Kenneth Johnson wrote an adaptation titled Storm Warnings in 1982. The script was presented to NBC for production as a television miniseries, but NBC executives rejected it as too "cerebral" for the average American viewer. To make the script more marketable, the Visitors were recast as man-eating extraterrestrials to capitalize on the popularity of franchises such as Star Wars. The production cost US$13 million (equivalent to $42 million in 2025). The production schedule was tight, to be ready for broadcast during the May 1983 sweeps. Overtime and the genre-typical larger number of visual and makeup effects led to relatively high costs.

Production was halted for two weeks when Dominique Dunne, the 22-year-old actress originally cast to play the part of Robin Maxwell, was murdered outside her apartment by her ex-boyfriend while rehearsing with actor David Packer. Some scenes with her are still in the original series, but only of the back of her head. Blair Tefkin was hired to play Robin after her death.

Johnson subsequently dedicated the series to her memory.

== Marketing ==
Posters appeared in train stations of a smiling man behind wraparound sunglasses, others grinning along with him, with only a motto "The Visitors are our friends" to explain it. Days later, those posters had a red "V" (for "victory") spray-painted on them. Nothing suggested this was an advertisement for a television show, which made the marketing even more intriguing.

== Releases ==
V premiered on Sunday, May 1, 1983, with part 2 being broadcast the next evening, May 2. The two-part miniseries was broadcast at a length of 200 minutes; the first part became the second-most popular program of the week, with 40% of the viewing television audience.

It was re-released as V: The Original Miniseries on VHS during the mid-1990s, in 4:3 fullscreen format as originally broadcast. It was re-released on DVD in 2001 in a matted 16:9 widescreen format. The miniseries was originally filmed in open matte format, with director Kenneth Johnson stating he had also composed the picture to be more or less "widescreen-safe" in the event that it got an overseas theatrical release, which it did not. It was released on Blu-ray on August 27, 2019.

== Legacy ==
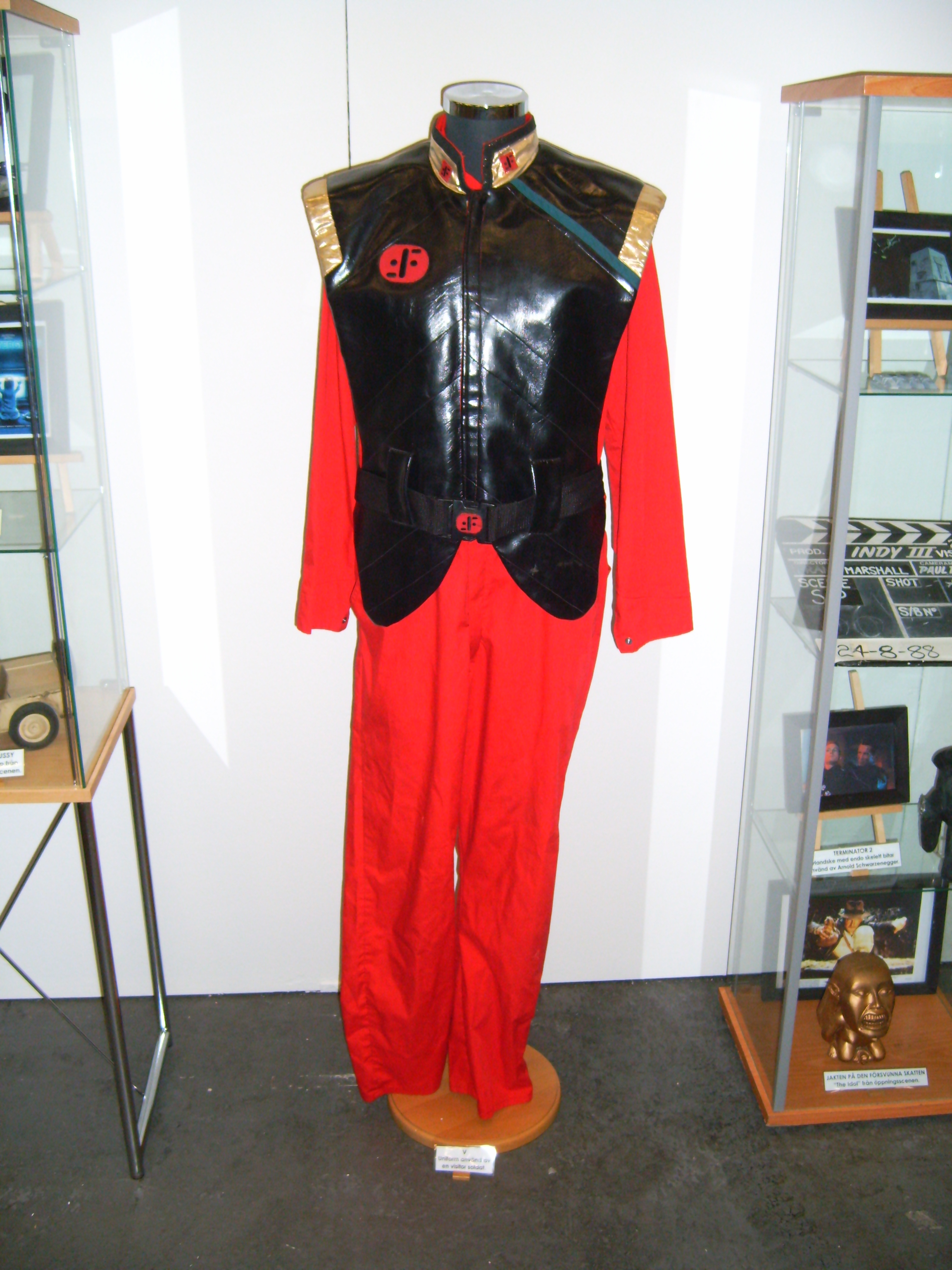
This uniform was shown at Stockholm International Fairs in 2011.

The ratings success of V spawned a sequel, V: The Final Battle, which was meant to conclude the story. However, this was followed by a weekly television series, V: The Series, from 1984 to 1985, set one year after The Final Battle. Johnson left V during production of The Final Battle due to disagreements with NBC over how the story should progress.

In November 2005, Entertainment Weekly named V one of the 10 best miniseries on DVD. The article noted, "As a parable about it-can-happen-here fascism, V was far from subtle, but it carved a place for lavish and intelligent sci-fi on TV. Its impact can still be felt in projects like Taken and The 4400." (The 4400's executive producer Scott Peters later helmed ABC's 2009 reboot.) In December 2008, Entertainment Weekly put V on its list "The Sci-Fi 25: The Genre's Best Since 1982", and called Visitor leader Diana's devouring a guinea pig "one of the best TV reveals ever".

For many years, Johnson campaigned to revive V, and even wrote a sequel novel, V: The Second Generation, which picks up the story 20 years after the original miniseries but omits the events of The Final Battle and V: The Series. Warner Bros. Television (which owns the television rights to the V franchise) declined to make a continuation as Johnson had planned, and opted for a remake instead. A reimagining of V premiered on ABC on November 3, 2009, and ran for two seasons. Though Johnson was not involved in the remake, which features all new characters, executive producer Scott Peters said that it would acknowledge the most iconic moments from the original franchise and may potentially include actors from the original in new roles. Jane Badler and Marc Singer appear in the second season. In 2009, Johnson said he still planned a big-screen remake of his original V miniseries though no progress has been made.

On February 6, 2018, Desilu Studios announced that it would be producing a feature film of V. The film was to be written and directed by Kenneth Johnson and produced by John Hermansen, Barry Opper, and Johnson. Johnson added, "We are delighted to team up with Desilu to bring the timeless – and timely – story of resistance against tyranny into the 21st century ... V will be the first of a cinematic trilogy, which will tell the full epic tale in the manner I always envisioned." However, in late 2018, CBS (owners of the Desilu name) reportedly had initiated legal action against Charles B. Hensley, who had previously been convicted of a misdemeanor for selling an avian flu drug without FDA approval, whom they claim used the Desilu Studio name to influence investment into a shell company.

=== Novelization ===
A. C. Crispin wrote a 402-page V novelization in 1984 for Pinnacle Books that combines both the original miniseries and The Final Battle. Following the release of V: The Second Generation in 2008, Tor Books re-released the original miniseries' section of Crispin's book, with a new epilogue by Johnson that tied the events of the first miniseries with Second Generation.

== Cast ==
Humans
Character	Actor
Mike Donovan	Marc Singer
Juliet Parrish	Faye Grant
Ben Taylor	Richard Lawson
Caleb Taylor	Jason Bernard
Elias Taylor	Michael Wright
Kathleen Maxwell	Penelope Windust
Robert Maxwell	Michael Durrell
Robin Maxwell	Blair Tefkin
Polly Maxwell	Viveka Davis
Abraham Bernstein	Leonardo Cimino
Stanley Bernstein	George Morfogen
Lynn Bernstein	Bonnie Bartlett
Daniel Bernstein	David Packer
Ruby Engels	Camila Ashland
Kristine Walsh	Jenny Sullivan
Arthur Dupres	Hansford Rowe
Harmony Moore	Diane Cary
Eleanor Dupres	Neva Patterson
Tony Wah Chong Leonetti	Evan C. Kim
Sancho Gomez	Rafael Campos
Brad	William Russ
Sean Donovan	Eric Johnston

Visitors
Character	Actor
Diana	Jane Badler
John	Richard Herd
Steven	Andrew Prine
Martin	Frank Ashmore
Willie	Robert Englund
Brian	Peter Nelson
Lorraine	Greta Blackburn
Visitor Captain	Stack Pierce
