= Hansford Rowe =

American actor

Hansford Herndon Rowe Jr. (May 12, 1924 – September 5, 2017) was an American film, stage and television actor.

== Early life and education ==
Rowe was born in Richmond, Virginia, the son of Virginia Isabel (née Willis) and Hansford Herndon Rowe, who was a veterinarian. He was one of five siblings.

Rowe was a graduate of John Marshall High School. He served in the US Navy during World War II in the South Pacific on a minesweeper warship as a radio controller. He subsequently graduated with a degree in Theater Arts from University of Richmond.

== Career ==
His first television role was in the 1967 TV movie The Thanksgiving Visitor. In 1968, he had a non-speaking role as a judge in three episodes of the cult series Dark Shadows. In 1969, he played a judge on the long-running CBS daytime drama The Guiding Light.

Rowe played in the 1983 NBC miniseries V as Arthur Dupres, the stepfather of resistance leader Mike Donovan. He reprised his role in the 1984 sequel V: The Final Battle. Rowe made guest appearances on TV shows, including Love, Sidney, L.A. Law, The Greatest American Hero, Six Feet Under, Night Court and Will & Grace. He played President Harry S. Truman in Dark Skies.

Rowe's film roles include Gordon's War (1973), Missing (1982), Baby Boom (1987), and Dry Cycle (2003).

In 1980, Rowe appeared on Broadway in Nuts, for which he was nominated for the Drama Desk Award for Outstanding Featured Actor in a Play.

== Personal life ==
Rowe was married and had two sons and another by marriage.

On September 5, 2017, Rowe died in a car accident in Newhall, California. He was 93 years old. He donated his body for scientific study.

== Filmography ==
- Gordon's War (1973) – Dog Salesman
- Three Days of the Condor (1975) – Jennings
- Simon (1980) – Priest Babcock Beastly
- Missing (1982) – Senator
- Malibu (1983, TV Movie) – Dr. Ferraro
- V (1983, TV Mini-Series) – Arthur Dupres
- The Osterman Weekend (1983) – General Keever
- V: The Final Battle (1984, TV Mini-Series) – Arthur Dupres
- Dream West (1986, TV Mini-Series) – John Floyd
- Baby Boom (1987) – Sam Potts
- The First Power (1990) – Father Brian
- The Bonfire of the Vanities (1990) – Leon Bavardage
- Sandino (1991) – Ambassador Hanna
- For Their Own Good (1993) as Dr Barnes
- Dante's Peak (1997) – Warren Cluster
- Spider-Man: The Animated Series (1997, TV Series) – Thunderer/Jerry Carstairs
- You Lucky Dog (1998, TV Movie) – Mr. Windsor
- Dry Cycle (2003) – Ed
- Curb Your Enthusiasm (2005, TV Series) – Mr. Cone
- The Office (2007, TV Series) – Elbert Lapin
- The Perfect Family (2011) – Bishop Donnelly
