= Trust Me (1989 film) =

- Directed by: Robert Houston
- Written by: Robert Houston
- Produced by: Tony Brewster
- Starring: Adam Ant
- Cinematography: Tom Jewett
- Music by: Dan Wool
- Distributed by: Cinecom Pictures
- Release date: 1989
- Language: English

Trust Me is a 1989 American crime film written and directed by Robert Houston and starring Adam Ant, David Packer and Talia Balsam.

== Cast ==
- Adam Ant as James Callendar
- David Packer as Sam Brown
- Talia Balsam as Catherine Walker
- William De Acutis as Billy Brawthwaite
- Joyce Van Patten as Nettie Brown
- Barbara Bain as Mary Casal
- Brooke Davida as Denise Tipton
- Simon McQueen as Holly Windsor
- Alma Beltran as Imelda
- Marilyn Tokuda as Chic Girl
- Barbara Perry as Severe Woman
- Virgil Frye as Thug
- Rance Howard as Vern
