= Diane Cary =

American actress

- Other name: Diane Civita
- Occupation: Television actress
- Years active: 1973–present

Diane Cary is an American actress who has guest-starred in many TV shows. This includes a recurring role on the short-lived Misfits of Science, where she was credited as Diane Civita.

She also starred in V and V: The Final Battle in the 1980s as Harmony Moore, a human who fell in love with the visitor, Willie (played by Robert Englund). She guest-starred in three episodes alongside Lindsay Wagner on The Bionic Woman: as Arlene Hart on the two-parter episode "Jamie's Shield" (1976) and as Madeline Boylin "Rancho Outcast" (1978), and also, along with Bill Bixby on The Incredible Hulk as Carrie Taylor on the episode "Life and Death" (1978). She had a recurring role in Alien Nation 1989 and 1994; she also guest-starred in Fame in the 1987 episode "Alice Doesn't Work Here Anymore," Tales from the Crypt in the 1990 episode "Cutting Cards," L.A. Law in a 1994 episode called "How Am I Driving", and in two episodes of Forever Knight "Dead Air" and "Avenging Angel." In 1991, Cary appeared in the Koreyoshi Kurahara film Strawberry Road. In 1996 she appeared in a Dark Skies episode "Hostile Convergence". In 2006, Cary guest-starred on Cold Case (episode titled "The Key") and as Bradford's assistant in three episodes of Ugly Betty. More recently in 2009, she guest-starred in an episode of Defying Gravity. In 2014, Cary completed filming the horror-thriller film 'Kantemir' reuniting with her former V co-star Robert Englund after 30 years.

She is married to James D. Parriott the co-creator and executive producer of Forever Knight. She is also a screenwriter who wrote two episodes of Forever Knight (“Be My Valentine” and “Let No Man Tear Asunder”) in addition to her guest roles on the show.
