= Richard Herd =

American actor (1932–2020)

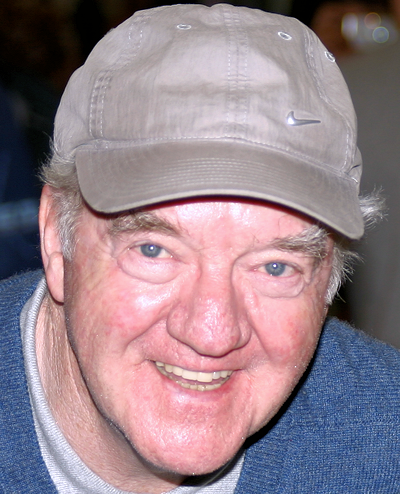
- Herd in 2005
- Born: Richard Thomas Herd Jr. September 26, 1932; Boston, Massachusetts, U.S.
- Died: May 26, 2020 (aged 87); Los Angeles, California, U.S.
- Occupation: Actor
- Years active: 1970–2019
- Spouses: Amilda Cuddy (m. 1954; div. 1955) Dolores Wozadlo (m. 1957, divorced) Patricia Crowder (m. 1980)
- Children: 2

Richard Thomas Herd Jr. (September 26, 1932 – May 26, 2020) was an American actor appearing in numerous supporting, recurring, and guest roles in television series and occasional film roles from the 1970s to the 2010s. He was well known in the science fiction community for his role in the 1983 NBC miniseries V and 1984 sequel V: The Final Battle, as John, the Visitors' Supreme Commander. Other major roles in his career included recurring parts on the NBC series seaQuest DSV as Admiral William Noyce; on Star Trek: Voyager as Admiral Owen Paris, the father of helmsman Tom Paris; and as George Costanza's boss Matt Wilhelm on Seinfeld. In two guest appearances on Quantum Leap, he played children's show host "Captain Galaxy", a would-be time traveler, and a miner named Ziggy Ziganovich. He also voiced Father Elijah in the Dead Money expansion for Fallout: New Vegas. Herd appeared at several fan conventions for his science fiction roles.

== Early life ==
Herd was born in Boston, the son of Katherine (Lydon) and Richard Herd Sr., a train engineer who died while serving in the Army during World War II.

Herd was drafted during the Korean War, injuring his knee during basic training. He served in the United States Army Ordnance Corps and was honorably discharged. He then worked in Long Island, New York, for the United States Army Signal Corps as a civilian actor, along with Robert Ludlum, making Army training films.

== Career ==
Herd started his career as an actor on the New York stage. He made his film debut in a minor role as a television presenter in Hercules in New York (1970), then portrayed Watergate burglar James W. McCord, Jr. in the Academy Award-winning All the President's Men (1976). Herd's first major film role was in the thriller The China Syndrome alongside Jane Fonda, Jack Lemmon and Michael Douglas, where he played the character Evan McCormack, the corrupt Chairman of the California Gas & Electric Board. This role helped make him well known outside the United States.

In addition to science fiction, he was a regular as Captain Dennis Sheridan on T. J. Hooker from 1982 to 1983 (he continued to appear on the series sporadically until 1984), and appeared on Seinfeld as Mr. Wilhelm, George Costanza's boss at the Yankees. Guest appearances included M*A*S*H, The Rockford Files, The Feather and Father Gang, The Golden Girls, Starsky & Hutch, Quantum Leap, The A-Team, Midnight Caller, Hart to Hart, NYPD Blue, Renegade, Pacific Blue, and JAG.

In 2012, he played Judge Paul Landsman in the TV series CSI: Miami episode "Rest in Pieces." Herd portrayed Roman Armitage in Get Out (2017).

== Recognition ==
Herd was inducted into the National Broadcaster Hall of Fame for his work in Old Time Radio.

Herd served as the third National Vice President of the Screen Actors Guild.

== Personal life and death ==
Herd lived in Los Angeles with his wife of 40 years, Patricia Crowder Herd. He died at his home from complications of colon cancer on May 26, 2020, aged 87.

== Filmography ==
Film
| Year | Title | Role | Notes |
|---|---|---|---|
| 1970 | Hercules in New York | Television Presenter | |
| 1976 | All the President's Men | James W. McCord, Jr. | |
| 1977 | I Never Promised You a Rose Garden | Dr. Halle | |
| 1978 | F.I.S.T | Mike Monahan | |
| 1979 | The China Syndrome | Evan McCormack | |
| 1979 | The Onion Field | Beat Cop | |
| 1980 | Wolf Lake | George | |
| 1980 | Schizoid | Donahue | |
| 1980 | Private Benjamin | General Foley | |
| 1981 | Lovely But Deadly | 'Honest Charley' Gilmarten | |
| 1983 | Deal of the Century | Lyle | |
| 1985 | Trancers | Chairman Spencer | |
| 1985 | Summer Rental | Angus MacLachlan | |
| 1987 | Planes, Trains and Automobiles | Walt | |
| 1989 | Gleaming the Cube | Ed Lawndale | |
| 1990 | Corporate Affairs | Cyrus Kinkaid | |
| 1990 | The Judas Project | Arthur Cunningham | |
| 1993 | Skeeter | | Uncredited |
| 1996 | Sgt. Bilko | Gen. Tennyson | |
| 1997 | Midnight in the Garden of Good and Evil | Henry Skerridge | |
| 1998 | The Survivor | Bradford | |
| 2000 | Joseph: King of Dreams | Jacob | Voice |
| 2003 | Roddenberry on Patrol | Captain Kirkus | Video short |
| 2005 | The Cabinet of Dr. Caligari | Commissioner Hans Raab | |
| 2005 | Confessions of a Pit Fighter | Father Mark | |
| 2005 | Checkers | Phillip | |
| 2006 | Vic | Richard Hanson | Short |
| 2007 | TV Virus | Professor Black | |
| 2007 | Anna Nicole | J. Howard Marshall | |
| 2007 | Dog Days of Summer | Frank Cooper | |
| 2007 | InAlienable | Professor Randolph Barnett | |
| 2017 | Get Out | Roman Armitage | |
| 2018 | The Oath | Old Man | |
| 2018 | The Mule | Tim Kennedy | |
| 2019 | The Silent Natural | Mr. Beagle | Final role |

Television
| Year | Title | Role | Notes |
|---|---|---|---|
| 1973 | Pueblo | Lt. Cmdr. C. Clark | TV movie |
| 1975 | Kojak | Bob | Episode: "A Question of Answers" |
| 1975 | The Rockford Files | Sheriff Cliff Gladish | Episode: "Pastoria Prime Pick" |
| 1976 | Hazard's People | Howard Frederickson | TV movie |
| 1976 | Captains and the Kings | Talmadge | Episode: "Chapter IV" (as Richard T. Herd) |
| 1977 | The Streets of San Francisco | Greene | Episode: "The Cannibals" |
| 1977 | The Feather and Father Gang | Applegate | Episode: "The Golden Fleece" |
| 1977 | Rafferty | | Episode: "Rafferty" |
| 1977 | The Hunted Lady | Capt. Wilson | TV movie |
| 1978 | Dr. Scorpion | Bill Worthington | TV movie |
| 1978 | Kate Bliss and the Ticker Tape Kid | Donovan | TV movie |
| 1978 | Terror Out of the Sky | Col. Mangus | TV movie |
| 1978 | Dr. Scorpion | The Dane | TV movie |
| 1979 | Eight Is Enough | George McArthur | Episode: "The Better Part of Valor" |
| 1979 | Starsky & Hutch | FBI Agent Smithers | Episodes: "Targets Without a Badge: Part 2 and 3" |
| 1979 | Ike: The War Years | Gen. Omar Bradley | Parts I, II, and III (miniseries) |
| 1979 | The Lazarus Syndrome | Morton | Episode: "Malpractice" |
| 1979 | Marciano | John Furst | TV movie |
| 1979–1981 | Hart to Hart | Waldo Sommerton / Lieutenant Fredricks | 2 episodes |
| 1980 | M*A*S*H | Capt. Bill Snyder | Episode: "Back Pay" |
| 1980 | Enola Gay: The Men, the Mission, the Atomic Bomb | General Groves | TV movie |
| 1980 | Fighting Back: The Rocky Bleier Story | Chuck Noll | TV movie |
| 1980–1981 | Dallas | John Mackey | 3 episodes |
| 1981 | The Misadventures of Sheriff Lobo | Dr. Smith | Episode: "The Girls with the Stolen Bodies" |
| 1981 | Elvis and the Beauty Queen | Thompson | TV movie |
| 1981 | The Greatest American Hero | Adam Taft | Episode: "The Greatest American Hero" |
| 1981 | Walking Tall | Philip Ballard | Episode: "Deadly Impact" |
| 1981 | Strike Force | | Episode: "Kidnap" |
| 1982 | Farrell for the People | Randolph Gardner (as Richard T. Herd) | TV movie |
| 1982 | The Devlin Connection | Lt. Harvey Bukowski | Episode: "Jennifer" |
| 1982–1984 | T. J. Hooker | Capt. Dennis Sheridan | 36 episodes |
| 1982–1988 | Simon & Simon | Police Officer Harry Flank / Consul Dearborn / Kyle Edmunds | 4 episodes |
| 1983 | The Powers of Matthew Star | Dave Wellman | Episode: "Dead Man's Hand" |
| 1983 | V | John | TV miniseries |
| 1984 | Falcon Crest | Calvin Kleeger | 2 episodes |
| 1984 | V: The Final Battle | John | TV miniseries |
| 1984–1985 | Hardcastle and McCormick | Colonel Joe Bartz / Arthur Huntley / Lonnie Vanatta | 2 episodes |
| 1985 | Matt Houston | Patrick Moffett | Episode: "The Beach Club Murders" |
| 1985 | The A-Team | Jonathan Durcell | Episode: "Waste 'Em!" |
| 1985 | Knight Rider | Lyle Jastrow | Episode: "Knight Strike" |
| 1986 | Dynasty | Jim Ellison | Episode: "The Cry" |
| 1986 | Scarecrow and Mrs. King | Jake Williamson | Episode: "Photo Finish" |
| 1986–1993 | Murder, She Wrote | Arnett Cobb / Harvey McKittrick | 2 episodes |
| 1987 | Hill Street Blues | Mike | Episode: "Norman Conquest" |
| 1987 | Rags to Riches | | Episode: "Foley vs. Foley" |
| 1987 | Ohara | Stillwell | Episode: "Brian" |
| 1987 | The Law and Harry McGraw | General Buckram | Episode: "Yankee Boodle Dandy" |
| 1987 | Beauty and the Beast | Richard Barnes | Episode: "A Children's Story" |
| 1988 | Favorite Son | | Part One |
| 1988 | My First Love | Chet Townsend | TV movie |
| 1989 | Matlock | Police Capt. Edward Hanna / The Mad Hatter | Episode: "The Captain" |
| 1989 | The Golden Girls | Ernie | Episode: "The Impotence of Being Ernest" |
| 1989 | Nashville Beat | Chief Kincaid | TV movie |
| 1989 | Mancuso, FBI | Red Burrows | Episode: "Little Saigon" |
| 1990 | Knots Landing | Dr. Aaron Stahl | 2 episodes |
| 1990 | China Beach | Bartender | Episode: "The Thanks of a Grateful Nation" |
| 1990 | Midnight Caller | Medina | Episode: "Protection" |
| 1990 | Fall from Grace | Richard Dortch | TV movie |
| 1990 | Jake and the Fatman | Frank Bronski | Episode: "God Bless the Child" |
| 1990 | Camp Cucamonga | Thornton Bradley | TV movie |
| 1990 | The Big One: The Great Los Angeles Earthquake | Ray Goodrich | TV movie |
| 1991 | Quantum Leap | Moe Stein | Episode: "Future Boy - October 6, 1957" |
| 1991 | Tales from the Crypt | Phil Stone | Episode: "Deadline" |
| 1992 | FBI: The Untold Stories | Robert Mackle | Episode: "Buried Alive" |
| 1992 | Seduction: Three Tales from the 'Inner Sanctum' | Charles Hackley | TV movie |
| 1992 | Renegade | Sheriff Frank Brown | Episode: "Mother Courage" |
| 1992 | Majority Rule | | TV movie |
| 1993 | Star Trek: The Next Generation | L'Kor | Episodes: "Birthright, Part I" "Birthright, Part II" |
| 1993 | Quantum Leap | Ziggy Ziganovich / Moe Stein | Episode: "Mirror Image - August 8, 1953" |
| 1993 | Dr. Quinn, Medicine Woman | Dr. John Hansen | Episodes: "Where the Heart Is: Parts 1 and 2 |
| 1993–1994 | SeaQuest DSV | Admiral Noyce / Secretary General Noyce | 12 episodes |
| 1994 | Winnetka Road | Mike | 3 episodes |
| 1994 | The Adventures of Brisco County, Jr. | President Cleveland | 2 episodes |
| 1994 | Robin's Hoods | Colonel Beckett | Episode: "To Heir Is Human" |
| 1994 | The Gift of Love | | TV movie |
| 1994 | Cosmic Slop | Cardinal (segment "The First Commandment") | TV movie |
| 1995 | The Secretary | Chuck Bosnell | TV movie |
| 1995 | ER | Dr. Murphy | Episode: "Men Plan, God Laughs" |
| 1995–1998 | Seinfeld | Matt Wilhelm | 11 episodes |
| 1996 | A Case for Life | Bud Cromwell | TV movie |
| 1996 | Yesterday's Target | Aaron Winfield | TV movie |
| 1996 | Shattered Mind | Chester | TV movie |
| 1996 | Walker, Texas Ranger | General Garrity | Episode: "Codename: Dragonfly" |
| 1996 | Grace Under Fire | Police captain | Episode: "Road to Nowhere" |
| 1997 | Bruno the Kid | voice | Episode: "The Spy Just Like Me" |
| 1997 | Journey of the Heart | Principal Martin | TV movie |
| 1997–98 | Pacific Blue | Ethan Callaway | 2 episodes |
| 1998 | Buffy the Vampire Slayer | Dr. Backer | Episode: "Killed by Death" |
| 1998 | I Married a Monster | Dr. Paul Drummond, Kelly's Uncle | TV movie |
| 1998 | Diagnosis: Murder | Archie Mullen | Episode: "Write, She Murdered" |
| 1998 | Caroline in the City | Barney Baxter | Episode: "Caroline and the Big Night" |
| 1999 | A Fare to Remember | Mr. Jennings | |
| 1999–2001 | Star Trek: Voyager | Admiral Owen Paris | 4 episodes |
| 2000 | JAG | Charlie Hoskins | Episode: "The Bridge at Kang So Ri" |
| 2001 | The Fugitive | Jack | Episode: "Jenny" |
| 2001 | The Song of the Lark | Reverend Larsen | TV movie |
| 2002 | Family Law | Judge Neil Walker | Episode: "Big Brother" |
| 2002 | The District | Sam SheridanAndi | Episode: "Faith" |
| 2003–2004 | Everwood | Herb Roberts | 2 episodes |
| 2004 | The O.C. | Bill Shaughnessy / Uncle Shaun | Episode: "The Telenovela" |
| 2004 | NYPD Blue | Jimmy McGowan | 2 episodes |
| 2005 | Ghost Whisperer | Stephen Devine | Episode: "Hope and Mercy" |
| 2007 | Desperate Housewives | Harry Gaunt | Episode: "Not While I'm Around" |
| 2007 | Love's Unfolding Dream | Windsor | |
| 2008 | Cold Case | Gene Karnow '08 | Episode: "Shore Leave" |
| 2010 | Elf Sparkle and the Special Red Dress | Sparks | Voice, TV movie |
| 2012 | CSI: Miami | Judge Paul Landsman | Episode: "Rest in Pieces" |
| 2012 | Betty White's Off Their Rockers | Various | 6 episodes |
| 2012 | Odessa | Ben | |
| 2013 | Rizzoli & Isles | Patrick Doyle, Sr. | Episode: "Partners in Crime" |
| 2015 | Star Trek: Renegades | Owen Paris | |
| 2018 | Shameless | Gerald | Episode: "Church of Gay Jesus" |
| 2018 | Hawaii Five-0 | Old Milton | Episode: "Pua a'e la ka uwahi o ka moe" |

Video Game
| Year | Title | Role | Notes |
|---|---|---|---|
| 2006 | Blue Dragon | Nene (Old) | (English version, Voice, Video Game |
| 2010 | Fallout: New Vegas | Father Elijah - Dead Money DLC | Voice, Video Game |
| 2013 | BioShock Infinite | Preacher Whitting | Voice, Video Game |
