= Michael Durrell =

American actor

- Born: Sylvester Salvatore Ciraulo; Brooklyn, New York, U.S.
- Occupation: Actor
- Years active: 1969–present

Michael Durrell (born Sylvester Salvatore Ciraulo) is an American actor.

== Career ==
Durrell began his career in the role of attorney Peter Wexler on the CBS soap opera The Guiding Light. In 1969, he appeared on Broadway in Cock-A-Doodle-Dandy at the Lyceum Theatre. Other television roles were as police Lieutenant Moraga in the short-lived CBS crime drama Shannon (1981–1982), starring Kevin Dobson in the title role, and then as Nicholas Stone from 1984–1985 on CBS's Alice.

Another well-known role was in 1983 in the NBC science fiction miniseries V and the 1984 sequel V: The Final Battle as Robert Maxwell; he reprised his role in the first two episodes of V: The Series. He played D.A. Lloyd Burgess on the hit TV series Matlock from 1986 to 1990, and as Dr. John Martin, the father of Donna Martin on the hit Fox TV series Beverly Hills, 90210, in which he had a recurring role. He guest starred in the Star Trek: Deep Space Nine episode "Sanctuary". He appears in Season 1, Episode 5 of The Eddie Capra Mysteries and Season 5, Episode 10 of Dexter.

== Film ==
Year	Title	Role	Notes
1978	Thank God It's Friday	Bar Boor	
1980	The American Success Company	Herman	
1984	Access Code	Michael Barnes	
1991	Defending Your Life	Agency Head	
1992	Sister Act	Larry Merrick	
1995	Illegal in Blue	Michael Snyder	Video
2005	Straight Flush	Richard Michael Crafton	Short
2005	Rumor Has It…	Patriarch	Uncredited
2008	Bald	Mr. Alan Stern	
2010	Barry Munday	Father Walsh	

== Television ==
Year	Title	Role	Notes
1969	Guiding Light	Peter Wexler	
1975	Starsky & Hutch	Fry	Episode: "Captain Dobey, You're Dead"
1975	Police Story	P.D. DeLong	Episode: "The Empty Weapon"
1977	The Sunshine Boys	Ben Clark	TV movie
1977	Carter Country	Kaplan	Episode: "Hail to the Chief"
1977	A Killing Affair	Cabrillo	TV movie
1976–1977	Kojak	Kenny Murray / Pete	2 episodes
1977	Search for Tomorrow	Mike Kaslo	4 episodes
1977	Hawaii Five-O	Charlie Davilo	Episode: "East Wind – Ill Wind"
1978	Black Sheep Squadron	Maj. J. Pearson	Episode: "Operation Stand-Down"
1978	Switch	Fred McGivers	Episode: "Three Blonde Mice"
1976–1978	The Tony Randall Show	Higgins / Gene Locatelli / Winslow	3 episodes
1978	When Every Day Was the Fourth of July	Assistant to the attorney	TV movie
1978	The Two-Five	Vinnie Lombardo	TV movie
1978	The Dark Secret of Harvest Home	Ty Barth	Miniseries
1978	Barney Miller	Philip Kubrick / Howard Altman	2 episodes
1978	The Eddie Capra Mysteries		Episode: "And the Sea Shall Give Up Her Dead"
1978	The Immigrants	Calvin Braderman	TV movie
1979	The Paper Chase	Gilbert	Episode: "The Apprentice"
1979	Barnaby Jones	Ted Richman	Episode: "Girl on the Road"
1979	Mrs. Columbo	Sergeant Caplan / Fisher	3 episodes
1980	Nobody's Perfect	Lt. Vince de Gennaro	8 episodes
1980	Soap	F. Peter Haversham	3 episodes
1980–1981	I'm a Big Girl Now	Walter Douglass	11 episodes
1982	House Calls		Episode: "Campaign in the Neck"
1980–1982	Quincy, M.E.	Sigerski's attorney / Dr. Tate Edmonds	2 episodes
1981–1982	Shannon	Lt. Rudy Maraga	9 episodes
1982	Voyagers!	Harry Houdini	Episode: "Agents of Satan"
1982	Romance Theatre	Christian	Episode: "Bayou Romance: Parts 1-5"
1983	Knight Rider	Paul DeBrett	Episode: "The Topaz Connection"
1983	V	Robert Maxwell	Miniseries
1983	Hotel	Lieutenant Pellegrini	Episode: "Hotel"
1983	Chiefs	John Howell	Part 3
1983	Goodnight, Beantown	Ed	Episode: "Looking Forward to the Past"
1984	V: The Final Battle	Robert Maxwell	3 Parts
1984	V: The Series	Robert Maxwell	Episodes: "Liberation Day" and "Dreadnought"
1984–1985	Alice	Nicholas Stone	4 episodes
1985	Highway to Heaven	Jim Haynes	Episode: "The Right Thing"
1985	Diff'rent Strokes	Detective Harris	Episode: "Sam's Missing"
1984–1986	Remington Steele	Donald Piper	2 episodes
1986	Dynasty	Sgt. Landers	2 episodes
1986	Scarecrow and Mrs. King	Thomas Blackthorne	Episode: "Unfinished Business"
1983–1987	Hill Street Blues	Joe Furillo / Irv Luboff	5 episodes
1987	The Last Innocent Man	District Attorney	TV movie
1987	Family Sins	Dr. Hamilton	TV movie
1987–1988	Santa Barbara	Alex Nikolas	84 episodes
1982–1988	Cagney & Lacey	Kurts / Anthony Berwick	2 episodes
1988	Hunter	Whitney Ferris	Episode: "Boomerang"
1989	L.A. Law	Joseph Schaeffer	Episode: "The Plane Mutiny"
1989	From the Dead of Night	Dr. Morrow	TV movie
1989	Who's the Boss?	Richard Braden	Episode: "Mother and Child Disunion"
1990	Father Dowling Mysteries	Dr. Latimer	Episode: "The Ghost of a Chance Mystery"
1990	Dragnet	John O'Connor	Episode: "Trespass"
1990	Equal Justice	Jason Prentiss	Episode: "Courting Disaster"
1991	Jake and the Fatman	Marcus Webster	Episode: "I'd Do Anything"
1991	P.S.I. Luv U	Leo Fallbrook	Episode: "What's Up, Bugsy?
1986–1992	Matlock	D.A. Lloyd Burgess	22 episodes
1992	Silk Stalkings	Gordon Tully	Episode: "Irreconcilable Differences"
1992	Secrets	Victor Sabachelli	2 episodes
1986–1993	CBS Schoolbreak Special	Lieutenant Gennaro / Nick Miller	2 episodes
1993	Star Trek: Deep Space Nine	General Hazar	Episode: "Sanctuary"
1993–1995	Renegade	Howard Hamster / Judge Charles Hollister	2 episodes
1993–2000	Beverly Hills, 90210	Dr. John Martin	32 episodes
1994	Menendez: A Killing in Beverly Hills	Bob Winters	TV movie
1994	Alien Nation: Dark Horizon	Avid Fan	TV movie
1996	Pacific Blue	Defense Attorney Malone	Episode: "First Shoot"
1997	Law & Order	Attorney Hilburne	Episode: "Harvest"
2001	Philly	Judge Simon Green	Episode: "Loving Sons"
2003	ER	Bob Gilman	Episode: "A Little Help from My Friends"
2004	NYPD Blue	Judge Kepler	Episode: "I Like Ike"
2004	Judging Amy	Larry Feiner	Episode: "Catching It Early"
2006	Magma: Volcanic Disaster	President Fletcher	TV movie
2006	Desperate Housewives	Mr. Katzburg	3 episodes
2007	Brothers & Sisters	Judge Howard Chandler	Episode: "Domestic Issues"
2008	Without a Trace	Councilman Pfeiffer	Episode: "4G"
2009	Mental	Alan Jennings	Episode: "Life and Limb"
2010	Persons Unknown	Dr. David Salinger	Episode: "Shadows in the Cave"
2010	Dexter	Stuart Frank	Episode: "In the Beginning"
2013	The Mindy Project	Dr. Walters	Episode: "Santa Fe"
2013	Christmas in the City	Santa	TV movie
2016–2018	Grace and Frankie	Sonny	2 episodes
