= Senior Trip (1981 film) =

- Genre: Comedy
- Written by: Kenneth Johnson; Dan Kibbie
- Directed by: Kenneth Johnson
- Starring: Scott Baio; Faye Grant; Randy Brooks
- Music by: Joe Harnell; Kenneth Johnson
- Country of origin: United States
- Original language: English

Production
- Executive producer: Kenneth Johnson
- Producer: Dan Kibbie
- Production locations: New York City; Washington Irving Middle School in Tarrytown, New York, USA
- Cinematography: John McPherson
- Editor: Jack W. Schoengarth
- Running time: 96 minutes
- Production companies: Kenneth Johnson Productions; Quinn Martin Productions

Original release
- Network: CBS
- Release: December 30, 1981

Senior Trip is a 1981 American made-for-television comedy film, directed by Kenneth Johnson and starring Scott Baio.

== Plot ==
A group of graduating students from a mid-western high school comes to New York City on a trip to celebrate the impending end of school. The students include: Roger Ellis, an ambitious teen aiming for success in big business; David, an aspiring rock star; Judy Matheson, a stagestruck coed actress wannabe; Denise, a free-spirited girl hoping to obtain a degree of sophistication; Fred, a lothario looking for any Big City woman to be with; and Jon Lipton, a would-be artist hoping to make it big. Mickey Rooney also appears as himself.

== Cast ==
- Scott Baio as Roger Ellis
- Faye Grant as Denise
- Randy Brooks as David
- Peter Coffield as Jerry
- Mickey Rooney as Himself
- Jane Hoffman as Mrs. Pritchardson
- Jeffrey Marcus as Jon Lipton (credited as Jeff Marcus)
- Liz Callaway as Judy Matheson
- James Carroll as Fred
- Ralph Davis as Victor "Vic"
- Ron Fassler as Bob
- Julia Montgomery as Marlene
- Bernard Barrow as Nathan Aldrich
- Robert Hitt as Stanley Simpson
- Vincent Spano as Dick
- Robert Townsend as Randy
- Jason Alexander as Pete
