= Jenny Sullivan =

American actress (born 1946)

- Occupations: Actress, theatre director
- Years active: 1968–present
- Spouse: Jim Messina (m. 1970; div. 1980)
- Father: Barry Sullivan

Jenny Sullivan is an American film and television actress. She has starred in some TV movies, and her best-known role is reporter Kristine Walsh in the 1983 miniseries V and its 1984 sequel V: The Final Battle.

== Early years ==
Sullivan is the daughter of actor Barry Sullivan and his first wife Marie Brown, who performed in musicals on Broadway.

== Career ==
Sullivan's first feature film was The Angry Breed (1968). Other film appearances include Plaza Suite (1971), The Other (1972), The Candidate (1972), Getting Straight (1970), Breakfast in Bed (1977) and Shadow of Doubt (1998).

Sullivan portrayed Barbara in the NBC comedy series Me and Maxx (1980). She has made guest appearances on TV shows, including Little House on the Prairie, Dragnet, Adam-12, The F.B.I., Highway to Heaven, Love, American Style, Dan August, Sanford and Son, Ironside, Falcon Crest, L.A. Law, All in the Family, Cannon, Hawaii Five-O (as Alma Saunders in the sixth-season episode "Murder is a Taxing Affair"), The Waltons, and The Fall Guy. She also played the character of Angie in The Mod Squad episode “Suffer the Little Children.” and Starsky and Hutch 1976.

Sullivan wrote the play J for J (Journals for John) which was prompted after she found a packet of unsent letters (in 1995) written by her father decades earlier to her mentally disabled older brother Johnny (thus, journals for Johnny). The play premiered on October 20, 2001. John Ritter, who in real life had a disabled brother, played Johnny, Sullivan played herself, and Jeff Kober portrayed her father Barry.

Sullivan taught drama at the University of California at Santa Barbara.

== Personal life ==
Sullivan was married to guitarist/producer Jim Messina.

== Filmography ==
Year	Title	Role	Notes
1968	The Angry Breed		
1970	Getting Straight	Sheila	
1971	Plaza Suite	Mimsey Hubley	
1972	The Other	Torrie	
1972	The Candidate	Lynn	
1977	Breakfast in Bed	Sara	
1979	Little House On The Prairie	Leslie Harper	
1998	Shadow of Doubt	Foreman - Mayer's Trial	
