= Kenneth Johnson (filmmaker) =

American filmmaker (born 1942)

- Born: Kenneth Culver Johnson; October 26, 1942 (age 83); Pine Bluff, Arkansas, U.S.
- Education: Carnegie Institute of Technology
- Occupations: Television producer; director; screenwriter; author
- Years active: 1968–present
- Spouses: Bonnie Hollaway (m. 1963; div. 1975) Susan Appling (m. 1977)
- Children: 4
- Website: kennethjohnson.us

Kenneth Culver Johnson (born October 26, 1942) is an American screenwriter, producer, director and novelist. He is known as the creator of the V science fiction franchise as well as The Bionic Woman (1976–78), The Incredible Hulk series (1977–82), and the TV adaptation (1989) of Alien Nation. His creative efforts are almost entirely concentrated in the area of television science fiction.

== Early life ==
A native of Pine Bluff, Arkansas, Johnson is a graduate of the Carnegie Institute of Technology.

== Career ==
=== 1970s ===
His early TV work includes The Six Million Dollar Man, The Bionic Woman and The Incredible Hulk. Johnson created the character of Jaime Sommers and The Bionic Woman, an American television series starring Lindsay Wagner that aired for three seasons between 1976 and 1978 as a spin-off from The Six Million Dollar Man.

=== 1980s ===
In 1983, he wrote and directed the original miniseries V, about an invasion of Earth by reptilian aliens, originally inspired by Sinclair Lewis' anti-fascist novel It Can't Happen Here (1935). The miniseries aired on NBC, and a year later was followed by a sequel, V: The Final Battle, which Johnson briefly worked on before leaving the project due to disagreements with the network. Johnson was subsequently credited as a co-writer of the sequel miniseries under the pseudonym Lillian Weezer, and was not involved at all in the weekly V television series that followed.

He directed Short Circuit 2 in 1988.

In 1989, he produced the television series Alien Nation based on the 1988 film of the same name.

=== 1990s ===
He wrote and directed 1994 Baker Street: Sherlock Holmes Returns in 1993, an American television movie about the fictional detective Sherlock Holmes, that stars Anthony Higgins as Holmes.

He wrote and directed five TV movies that served as spin-offs to his Alien Nation series. They were: Alien Nation: Dark Horizon (1994), Alien Nation: Body and Soul (1995), Alien Nation: Millennium (1996), Alien Nation: The Enemy Within (1996), and Alien Nation: The Udara Legacy (1997).

In 1997, he wrote and directed the movie Steel, based on the DC comic book character Steel. It featured basketball player Shaquille O'Neal as John Henry Irons, the character's alter-ego. The film was a financial and critical failure.

He directed the 1999 Disney Channel Original Movie Zenon: Girl of the 21st Century, starring Kirsten Storms as the eponymous heroine. The film was based on the book Zenon: Girl of the 21st Century written by Marilyn Sadler and Roger Bollen.

In 1999 he also directed Don't Look Under the Bed, a Disney Channel Original Movie.

=== 2000s ===
In 2006, Johnson announced his completion of a four-hour script for a new V mini series called V: The Second Generation. The storyline takes place 20 years after the original 1983 mini-series, ignoring the second mini-series (V: The Final Battle) and subsequent weekly television series. However, NBC told Johnson that they were more interested in a remake of the original V mini-series instead, which, if successful, might lead to his proposed sequel.

Since then, Johnson adapted his screenplay for V: The Second Generation into a novel. It was published by Tor Books and released on February 5, 2008. However, since his discussions with NBC, Warner Bros (who hold the television rights to the V franchise) have opted to produce a remake of V (written by Scott Peters) for the ABC Network, thus ending any prospect of Johnson's sequel being produced for television.

In April 2008, Johnson stated his intention to remake the original V mini-series and his new sequel V: The Second Generation into feature films. Johnson claimed to have been in discussions with producers interested in the project. Since this statement, Johnson's potential film production has not been developed further, although talks with potential backers are still ongoing. The Warner Bros. television remake for ABC premiered on November 3, 2009. It was canceled in 2011, after two seasons, due to low ratings.

=== 2010s ===
In 2017, Johnson published the novel The Man of Legends.

== Personal life ==
Johnson married Bonnie Hollaway on February 2, 1963; the couple had three children and divorced in 1975. On June 19, 1977 (the day after completing filming of the pilot movie of The Incredible Hulk series), he married Susan Appling; they have one child.

== Filmography ==
Film

Year	Title	Director	Writer
1988	Short Circuit 2	Yes	
1996	D3: The Mighty Ducks		Story
1997	Steel	Yes	Yes

TV movies

Year	Title	Director	Writer	Producer	Notes
1969	Alan King and His Buddy	Yes			
1970	An Evening of Edgar Allan Poe	Yes	Yes	Yes	
1980	Senior Trip	Yes	Yes	Yes	Also composer
1993	1994 Baker Street: Sherlock Holmes Returns	Yes	Yes	Yes	
1994	Dark Horizon	Yes		Yes	Part of Alien Nation series
1995	Body and Soul	Yes		Yes	Part of Alien Nation series
1996	Millennium	Yes	Yes	Yes	Part of Alien Nation series
1996	The Enemy Within	Yes	Yes	Yes	Part of Alien Nation series
1997	The Udara Legacy	Yes		Yes	Part of Alien Nation series
1999	Zenon: Girl of the 21st Century	Yes			
1999	Don't Look Under the Bed	Yes			

TV series

Year	Title	Director	Writer	Producer	Creator	Notes
1973	Alan King Looks Back in Anger: A Review of 1972	Yes				TV special
1973	Alan King in Las Vegas	Yes				Two-part TV special
1973	Adam-12	Yes	Yes			Wrote 2 episodes; Directed episode "Training Division: The Rookie"
1973	Griff	Yes	Yes			Wrote and directed episode "The Framing of Billy the Kid"
1975–76	The Six Million Dollar Man		Yes	Yes		Wrote 10 episodes
1976–78	The Bionic Woman	Yes	Yes	Yes	Yes	Wrote and directed 3 episodes; Wrote 7 episodes
1977–82	The Incredible Hulk	Yes	Yes	Yes	Developer	Wrote and directed 4 episodes; Wrote 3 episodes
1979	Cliffhangers	Yes	Yes	Yes	Yes	Wrote and directed 3 episodes Wrote 2 segments (in 2 episodes)
1984	Hot Pursuit	Yes	Yes	Yes	Yes	Wrote and directed episode "Pilot"
1984–85	V				Yes	
1985–86	Shadow Chasers	Yes	Yes	Yes	Yes	Wrote and directed episode "Pilot Part 1"
1987	Disneyland	Yes	Yes	Yes		Episode "The Liberators"
1989–90	Alien Nation	Yes	Yes	Yes	Developer	Wrote and directed episode "Pilot"; Also composer
1999–2001	Seven Days	Yes				10 episodes
2002–05	JAG	Yes				11 episodes
2009	Easy Money	Yes				Episode: "BassMaster"
2009–11	V		Yes		Yes	Wrote story for episode "Pilot"

Miniseries

Year	Title	Director	Writer	Producer	Creator
1983	V	Yes	Yes	Yes	
1984	V: The Final Battle		Yes		Yes

== Bibliography ==
Johnson has published several novels, much of it based on his pre-existing TV works.

Novels

Year of publication	Title	Notes
1974	The Last Snows of Spring	Novelisation of the Italian film
2007	V: The Second Generation	Sequel novel to the V miniseries
2008	V: The Original Miniseries	Novelisation of the V miniseries, co-authored by A.C. Crispin
2017	The Man of Legends	Original novel
2018	The Darwin Variant	Original novel
2022	Holmes Coming	Novelisation of 1994 Baker Street: Sherlock Holmes Returns
2025	The Face in the Mirror	Original novel
