= Faye Grant =

American actress (born 1957)

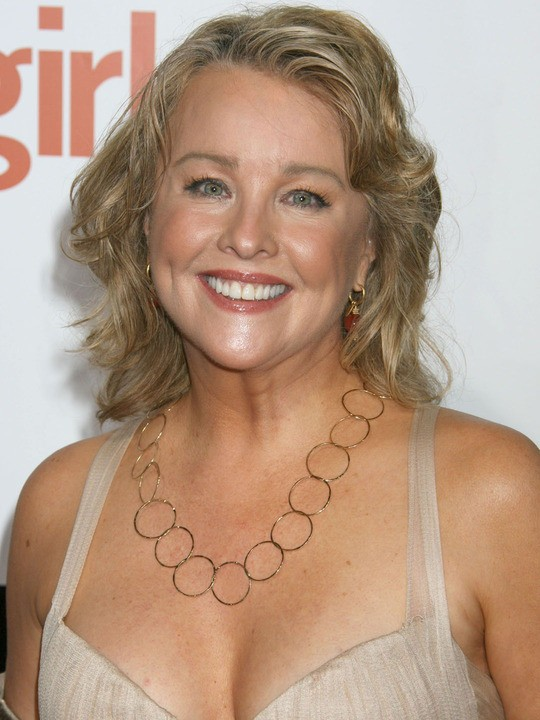
- Grant in 2016
- Born: July 16, 1957 (age 69)
- Occupation: Actress
- Years active: 1981–present
- Spouse: Stephen Collins (m. 1985; div. 2015)
- Children: 1

Faye Grant (born July 16, 1957) is an American actress. She is best known for her role as Julie Parrish in NBC's science fiction series V between 1983 and 1985.

== Career ==
Her first television role was on the TV series The Greatest American Hero, in which she appeared as Rhonda Blake, one of the students of main character Ralph Hinkley (William Katt). Her best-known role came in 1983 as Juliet Parrish in the science fiction mini-series V, the 1984 sequel V: The Final Battle and V: The Series from 1984 to 1985. Her film credits include The January Man (1989), Internal Affairs (1990), Drive Me Crazy (1999), Omen IV: The Awakening (1991) and Public Affairs (2017).

She has also appeared on shows starring Stephen Collins: the TV series version of Tales of the Gold Monkey, and 7th Heaven. She guest-starred as Abigail "Abby" Morris in the 7th Heaven episode "What Will People Say?", which first aired on November 11, 1996. They also co-starred in Drive Me Crazy (1999).

Grant starred on Broadway as vocally challenged Lina Lamont in the 1985 stage adaptation of Singin' in the Rain, which won her the Theatre World Award and a Drama Desk Award nomination as Outstanding Featured Actress in a Musical. In director Jerry Zaks' 1986 Lincoln Center-to-Broadway revival of John Guare's The House of Blue Leaves, Grant played the deaf Corinna Stroller, following Julie Hagerty and Patricia Clarkson in the role.

Grant has made guest appearances in TV shows like The Incredible Hulk, the Voyagers! pilot episode as Mary Murphy, Hardcastle and McCormick, Time of Your Life and Tales From the Crypt. She appeared on the show State of Grace from 2001 to 2002 as Tattie McKee.

== Personal life ==
Grant married actor Stephen Collins in April 1985 in New York City. They have a daughter, Kate. Grant met Collins during production of Tales of the Gold Monkey in the early 1980s.

She recorded a marriage counseling session in 2012 without the knowledge of Collins or the therapist, in which Collins confessed to having sexually abused children in the past. A police investigation took place and the recording of the session was leaked. After the recording became public, Collins admitted to the abuse and publicly apologized. Their divorce was finalized in January 2015.

== Filmography ==
Film
Year	Title	Role	Notes
1982	Voyager from the Unknown		direct-to-video
1982	Foxfire Light	Joanna Morgan	
1988	Crossing Delancey	Candyce	
1989	The January Man	Alison Hawkins	
1990	Internal Affairs	Penny Stretch	
1992	The Gun in Betty Lou's Handbag	Charleen Barnes	
1992	Traces of Red	Beth Frayn	
1996	Vibrations	Zina	direct-to-video
1999	Drive Me Crazy	Mrs. Maris	
2002	Manna From Heaven	Rita	
2008	My Best Friend's Girl	Marrilee	
2017	Affairs of State	Mary Maples	
Television
Year	Title	Role	Notes
1981	Homeroom	Tina	Television short
1981	Senior Trip	Denise	Television film
1981–1983	The Greatest American Hero	Rhonda Blake	22 episodes
1982	The Incredible Hulk	Christy	1 episode: "Slaves"
1982	Voyagers!	Mary Murphy	1 episode: "Voyagers"
1983	Tales of the Gold Monkey	Genevieve LaBatier	1 episode: "Last Chance Louie"
1983	V	Juliet Parrish	Television film/mini-series
1983	Hardcastle and McCormick	Barbara Johnson	2 episodes: "Rolling Thunder: Parts 1 and 2"
1984	V: The Final Battle	Juliet Parrish	3 episodes: "Parts 1, 2 and 3"
1984–1985	V	Juliet Parrish	Main role; 19 episodes
1987	Private Eye	Lana Williams	Television film
1988	Tattingers	Charlene Tweed	1 episode: "Two Men and a Baby"
1991	Omen IV: The Awakening	Karen York	Television film
1991	Tales from the Crypt	Janet	1 episode "Spoiled"
1995	The Wright Verdicts	Daphney Gamber	1 episode: "Ex-Corpus Delicti"
1996	7th Heaven	Abby Morris	1 episode: "What Will People Say?"
1997	Unwed Father	Lillian Kempler	Television film
1999	Time of Your life	Joan	3 episodes: "The Time She Got Mobbed", "The Time the Truth Was Told" and "The Time They Had Not"
2001–2002	State of Grace	Tattie McKee	40 episodes
