= V The Final Battle =

1984 American science fiction television miniseries

- 2002 DVD cover
- Genre: Science fiction
- Created by: Kenneth Johnson
- Written by: See individual episodes
- Directed by: Richard T. Heffron
- Starring: Marc Singer; Faye Grant; Jane Badler; Andrew Prine; Richard Herd; Michael Durrell; Michael Ironside; David Packer; Peter Nelson; Blair Tefkin; Robert Englund; Michael Wright; Sandy Simpson; Denise Galik; Thomas Hill
- Composers: Joseph Conlan; Barry De Vorzon; Dennis McCarthy
- Country of origin: United States
- Original language: English
- No. of episodes: 3

Production
- Executive producers: Daniel H. Blatt; Kenneth Johnson; Robert Singer
- Producers: Patrick Boyriven; Dean O'Brien
- Cinematography: Stevan Larner
- Editors: Michael F. Anderson; Paul Dixon
- Running time: 270 minutes (total)
- Production companies: Blatt-Singer Productions; Warner Bros. Television

Original release
- Network: NBC
- Release: May 6 – May 8, 1984

Related
- V (1983 miniseries); V (1984 TV series); V (2009 TV series)

V: The Final Battle (abbreviated as V:TFB) is a 1984 American science fiction TV miniseries. It is a sequel to the 1983 miniseries V written by Kenneth Johnson about aliens known as "The Visitors" trying to take over Earth.

Johnson parted ways with NBC over creative differences regarding the content of the miniseries; his writing contribution is credited under the pseudonym "Lillian Weezer". With a budget of $14 million (one million more than the original four hours), production was delayed until script finalised in December 1983 and filming commenced in mid-January 1984, concluding in late March just six weeks before air date.

V: The Final Battle is included in the V novelization written by A. C. Crispin.

== Synopsis ==
V: The Final Battle was played out over three episodes, starting four months after the events of the original miniseries concluded.

=== Part 1 ===
Teleplay by Brian Taggert and Peggy Goldman
Story by Lillian Weezer & Peggy Goldman & Faustus Buck (pseudonym for Craig Faustus Buck) & Diane Frolov and Harry & Renee Longstreet

The first episode begins with a nightmare showing Mike Donovan and his son, Sean, trying to escape from a Visitor mother-ship with Visitor troopers in pursuit. Mike is knocked down by laser fire, Sean is shot in the back and apparently killed. Julie rouses Mike from his sleep as the Resistance prepares for a raid on a Visitor processing plant to rescue humans who have been repackaged into food cocoons. The raid is easily thwarted at the plant perimeter, due to the Visitors' advanced armor and security measures. In the raid's debriefing at the Resistance hideout, the team bickers over how things went wrong. Robin Maxwell's pregnancy is also at an advanced stage but she has told nobody that the father is a Visitor.

The rebels later get wind of a major event to be held at the Los Angeles Medical Center, where John is expected to announce a medical breakthrough—a universal cancer cure. Due to the extensive media coverage, the rebels infiltrate the hospital. While he can provide uniforms for the infiltration, Martin however cannot supply weapons, as all Visitor armories are heavily guarded. The rebels scout the facility and secure medical supplies. Meanwhile, after discovering that the Visitors are indeed reptilian, Robin insists on an abortion with Julie's help. However, the abortion is canceled because of potentially fatal complications to Robin and she is therefore forced to continue with the pregnancy to full term.

Meanwhile, television reporter Kristine Walsh begins to doubt her association with the Visitors, after Mike's claim that Sean is a captive aboard the mother-ship. Her suspicions are aroused even more after a well-known doctor makes a stinging criticism about her being the Visitors' puppet spokesperson, but then days later gives her a tremendously warm reception (due to Diana's subjecting him to her conversion process). During a scouting mission, the rebels succeed in capturing Willie, a friendly Visitor technician, whom they bring to their hideout for study. Willie's human girlfriend, Harmony, then makes a case among the rebels for humane treatment of the prisoner.

The hospital raid is a success, with Julie unmasking John's true, reptilian nature. Martin and Lorraine, another member of the Fifth Column, prevent the mother-ship from cutting off the live feed. Diana also kills Kristine after she disobeys her orders to report the incident as a terrorist hoax and instead makes a desperate call for rebellion. After a firefight inside the hospital corridors, the rebels escape with help from the Fifth Column, who have assigned a transport crew to "capture" them; however, it is a Pyrrhic victory, as Julie, now separated from the group, is captured during her attempt to escape from the hospital.

After the fiasco of the previous evening Diana has the scene re-enacted under heavy security to be passed off as the actual broadcast, with the audience held at gunpoint and Eleanor DuPres eagerly taking Kristine's place reporting the event. As it concludes, Stephen tells John and Diana they have the location of the resistance base and that troops are on their way.

On the mothership, Julie is forced to undergo the conversion process. As Julie's brainwashing begins, Diana watches, claiming Julie will be her masterpiece.

=== Part 2 ===
Teleplay by Brian Taggert and Diane Frolov
Story by Lillian Weezer & Diane Frolov & Peggy Goldman & Faustus Buck

Two mercenaries, Ham Tyler and associate Chris Farber, join the Resistance. Ham reveals the existence of an international resistance force that can supply armor-piercing ammunition plus other effective weapons for the war.

The Visitors storm the hideout, but the rebels escape with the help of Tyler and Farber and further advance-warning from Ruby, who now works at the Visitors' security headquarters as a cleaner. They relocate to an old western movie studio.

Julie's brainwashing continues in the conversion chamber. The process inflicts horrifying hallucinations on Julie's mind, designed to brainwash her into a Visitor ally. However, she proves quite strong, forcing Diana to continually increase the intensity of the process. This eventually causes Julie to go into cardiac arrest and nearly die. Despite Julie's failing health, she is forced to undergo another conversion session. Frustrated with Julie's resistance, Diana takes the power of the chamber to maximum. Now in intense agony, Julie struggles to resist. Just as her heart is beginning to give out, Julie breaks and Diana stops the session. Julie collapses to the ground, seemingly converted. After the session, Mike Donovan bursts in and attempts to shoot Diana, but Jake kills him in time. Seeing this, however, appears to snap Julie out of her brainwashing. It is later revealed that the man appearing to be Mike is a Fifth Column agent in disguise.

Because of the danger of Fifth Column infiltration (especially now with the arrival of Diana's superior, Squadron Commander Pamela), Martin suggests that all major prisoners be transferred from the mother-ship to the security headquarters on the ground for further protection. Mark's girlfriend, Maggie Blodgett, who has seduced collaborator and Visitor Youth member Daniel Bernstein, brings this information to the rebels, who see the opportunity and rescue Julie. Daniel, however, kills Ruby after she cuts the power for the laser fencing, a critical part of the operation.

Once again in the ranks of the Resistance, Julie tells the others of a 30-day plan to steal all the water from southern California by means of a water pipeline to a Visitor mothership. With the aid of devices that make their voices similar to those of the Visitors, the rebels scout the facility and prepare to destroy it. Tyler questions Julie's loyalty, convinced she had been converted. She responds firmly and retains command in front of the others. In private, however, she is mentally scarred from her torture aboard the mothership. She shows signs that the conversion was successful, making her unsure of herself. She finally seeks comfort in Mike's arms. At the same time, Maggie confronts Mark over their relationship in light of her undercover liaison with Daniel. They make peace, and he proposes to her.

The attack on the water facility goes as planned, and after explosives are placed a fire-fight ensues between the rebels and the aliens. Mark is wounded and sacrifices his life to cover the escape. Maggie grieves over the loss of her fiancé.

Later on, Diana and Stephen appear in a news bulletin along with Sean, whom Stephen had ordered Brian to take out of stasis as a favor to Eleanor. It is a clear invitation for Mike to surrender to them in exchange for his son. Mike gives himself up and is taken on a mothership, while Ham and Julie bring Sean to safety. The rebels relocate to an old city jail afterwards, where their prisoner Willie gradually wins their trust when he helps Robin through her pre-labor stage.

A Fifth Column agent named Oliver visits Mike at his cell and offers a suicide pill to prevent him from divulging information about the Resistance and the Fifth Column, in light of Diana's ultra-potent truth serum. Jake kills Oliver and Diana injects Mike with the drug. The effects take place immediately, with Mike forced to compromise Martin, who is present. Martin tries to shoot Diana, but she escapes with the knowledge that he is a Fifth Columnist. Donovan and Martin hide in the mother-ship's air shafts.

The episode ends when Robin goes into labor and via a caesarian section gives birth to dizygotic twins—a human looking girl with a forked tongue, and a reptilian boy with blue human-like eyes.

=== Part 3 ===
Teleplay by Brian Taggert and Faustus Buck
Story by Lillian Weezer & Faustus Buck & Diane Frolov & Peggy Goldman

The first few days after Robin's delivery prove to be challenging for her and the others. The male child dies while the baby girl, Elizabeth, begins to grow at a rapid rate. Julie and Robert's analysis of the male child's corpse reveals certain bacteria that affected only the boy, despite his proximity to Elizabeth in the uterus. Encouraged by the sudden development, the duo decide to culture the germs as a potential weapon.

Mike Donovan and Martin skydive out of the mothership and Martin hides with other ground-based Fifth Columnists. After Mike reaches the jail, the team discuss testing the bacterium, now called the "Red Dust," but firmly reject Ham's suggestion of using Willie as a guinea pig. Instead, the rebels capture Brian at the Bernstein house and frame Daniel. Stephen retaliates by sending Daniel off to be processed as food.

The team locks up Brian, and Robin (with Elizabeth in tow) visits him in the middle of the night. However, the family reunion is short, as Robin seeks revenge by throwing a vial of the Red Dust into Brian's holding chamber. The results are fatal. Father Andrew Doyle, the team's resident priest, carries Elizabeth off to safety as the others look at the outcome. While Ham and Mike mull over capturing a Visitor Youth member to be used as a test subject, Julie enters the chamber and proves the dust is non-lethal to humans.

Father Andrew brings Elizabeth to Diana, who initially welcomes them. Later she shoots the priest after reading the Bible, realizing through its words that she is 'vulnerable.' The danger of compromise forces the rebels to evacuate and regroup at a coastal lighthouse complex, where more Red Dust stocks are produced. Ham and Mike get into a physical argument over delivering the stocks to other resistance groups before a vaccine is ready, one that would protect the Fifth Columnists.

Martin later asks Mike to stop producing the toxin and reveals the Visitors' contingency plan: using their mothership as a doomsday device if the situation was lost. In light of the new complication the team debate whether to attack. Elias makes the case that attack remains the best chance for saving the world, and the majority of the resistance agree.

The planning sessions take place, but Julie notices Sean overhearing the details. She then tells Mike of the possibility that Sean was converted before the exchange, which Ham later confirms. Sean escapes the hideout to warn the Visitors, but the original plan of using United States Air Force planes to spread the toxin into Earth's atmosphere turns out to be a ruse; the rebels will use hot air balloons instead. Martin and a number of Fifth Column members arrive at the complex aboard a Visitor tanker vehicle, which will carry a stock of Red Dust for dispersal aboard the mothership. They are later given a vaccine for the Red Dust.

The raid begins in earnest and Sean's false information leads the bulk of the Visitor forces to secure all airbases for an attack that never arrives. The tanker strike team manages to steal aboard the mother-ship, where Mike closes all security feeds as the rest of the team pump the toxin into the ventilation system. Robert, Ham, and Chris lead the assault on the Visitor security headquarters. Red Dust mortar blasts eliminate the defenders with no human casualties. Desperate to escape, Stephen kills Eleanor, but Ham takes him down long enough to douse his face with a bag of Red Dust. The balloons' mass dispersal of Red Dust around the world will allow the deadly bacteria to multiply in Earth's ecosystem. The Visitor forces evacuate Earth.

Diana activates the doomsday device aboard the Los Angeles ship before shooting John for his refusal to take part in her plan. Mike, Julie, Elias, and Lorraine get pinned down by Visitor troops in a ventilation tunnel. The Red Dust begins to circulate, killing more soldiers. Martin joins up with them as they face Diana on the bridge. Mike wounds Diana in the shoulder, disarming her. Lorraine and Mike attempt to disarm the auto-destruct sequence. The other rebels and Visitors evacuate the ship while Martin attempts to move it out of the atmosphere beyond Earth orbit. Diana uses her conversion of Julie to distract her long enough to escape. Elizabeth steps up and stops the countdown with her latent superhuman powers. Martin then brings the mothership back to Earth.

== Cast ==
=== Humans ===
- Marc Singer as Mike Donovan
- Faye Grant as Juliet Parrish
- Michael Ironside as Ham Tyler
- Mickey Jones as Chris Farber
- Thomas Hill as Father Andrew Doyle
- Michael Durrell as Robert Maxwell
- Viveka Davis as Polly Maxwell
- David Packer as Daniel Bernstein
- Neva Patterson as Eleanor Donovan Dupres
- Blair Tefkin as Robin Maxwell
- Michael Wright as Elias Taylor
- Jason Bernard as Caleb Taylor
- Hansford Rowe as Arthur Dupres
- Jenny Sullivan as Kristine Walsh
- Diane Civita as Harmony Moore
- Denise Galik as Maggie Blodgett
- Sandy Simpson as Mark
- Eric Johnston as Sean Donovan
- Jenny Beck as Elizabeth Maxwell

=== Visitors ===
- Jane Badler as Diana
- Sarah Douglas as Pamela
- Richard Herd as John
- Andrew Prine as Stephen
- Frank Ashmore as Martin
- Robert Englund as Willie
- Peter Nelson as Brian
- Greta Blackburn as Lorraine
- Stack Pierce as Jake

== Reception ==
Like the first miniseries, V: The Final Battle was successful for NBC. Its three parts averaged a 25.1 rating and 37 share, beating ABC's miniseries The Last Days of Pompeii, which aired on the same days as The Final Battle. Ed Siegel of The Boston Globe stated that The Final Battle was "by far the better" of the two and "spirited escapist entertainment", but still "rather uninspired". He judged both inferior to PBS's Concealed Enemies, which Siegel stated "treats its audience as if it has an IQ above 25."

In his review for the New York Times, John J. O'Connor opines how "in its own dizzy way, 'V' is rarely less than compelling," adding that, "the continuing saga is still impressive where it counts most in this sort of science-fiction caper. The overall look and the special effects are remarkably striking, perfectly calibrated for the context of the small television screen." On Rotten Tomatoes, V: The Final Battle has an aggregate score of 69% based on 20 positive and 9 negative critic reviews. The website’s consensus reads: "V tempers its ambitions for the better in this rousing if silly climax, dialing back the awkward allegory while upping the pulpy spectacle."

== Awards and nominations ==
Year	Association	Category	Result
1984	36th Primetime Emmy Awards	Outstanding Achievement in Makeup	Nominated
1984	36th Primetime Emmy Awards	Outstanding Film Sound Editing for a Limited Series or a Special	Nominated
1984	36th Primetime Emmy Awards	Outstanding Individual Achievement - Special Visual Effects	Nominated
1996	Saturn Award	Best Genre Video Release	Won
