= List of American films of 1983 =

This is a list of American films released in 1983.

== Box office ==
The highest-grossing American films released in 1983, by domestic box office gross revenue, are as follows:

Highest-grossing films of 1983
Rank	Title	Distributor	Domestic gross
1	Return of the Jedi	20th Century Fox	$309,306,177
2	Terms of Endearment	Paramount	$108,423,489
3	Flashdance	Paramount	$92,921,203
4	Trading Places	Paramount	$90,404,800
5	WarGames	United Artists	$79,567,667
6	Octopussy	United Artists	$67,893,619
7	Sudden Impact	Warner Bros.	$67,642,693
8	Staying Alive	Paramount	$64,892,670
9	Mr. Mom	20th Century Fox	$64,783,827
10	Risky Business	Warner Bros.	$63,541,777

== January–March ==
Opening		Title	Production company	Cast and crew	Ref.
J A N U A R Y	7	Xtro	New Line Cinema	Harry Bromley Davenport (director/screenplay); Michel Perry, Iain Cassie, Robert Smith (screenplay); Philip Sayer, Bernice Stegers, Simon Nash, Maryam d'Abo, Danny Brainin, Peter Mandell, David Cardy, Anna Wing, Robert Fyfe, Katherine Best, Robert Pereno, Sean Crawford, Tim Dry, Arthur Whybrow, Susie Silvey	
J A N U A R Y	18	Lianna	United Artists Classics	John Sayles (director/screenplay); Linda Griffiths, Jane Hallaren, Jon DeVries, Jo Henderson, Jessica MacDonald, Jesse Solomon, John Sayles, Stephen Mendillo, Betsy Julia Robinson, Nancy Mette, Maggie Renzi, Madelyn Coleman, Robyn Reeves, Chris Elliott, Marta Renzi, Rochelle Oliver	
J A N U A R Y	21	Independence Day	Warner Bros.	Robert Mandel (director); Alice Hoffman (screenplay); Kathleen Quinlan, David Keith, Frances Sternhagen, Cliff DeYoung, Dianne Wiest	
J A N U A R Y	21	The House on Sorority Row	Artists Releasing Corporation / Film Ventures International	Mark Rosman (director/screenplay); Bobby Fine (screenplay); Kathryn McNeil, Eileen Davidson, Lois Kelso Hunt, Robin Meloy, Harley Kozak, Michael Sergio, Christopher Lawrence, Janis Zido, Jodi Draigie, Ellen Dorsher, Michael Kuhn, Charles Serio, Ruth Walsh	
J A N U A R Y	21	Treasure of the Four Crowns	Cannon Film Distributors	Ferdinando Baldi (director); Lloyd Battista, Jim Bryce, Jerry Lazarus (screenplay); Tony Anthony, Ana Obregón, Gene Quintano, Jerry Lazarus, Francisco Rabal, Emiliano Redondo, Francisco Villena, Lewis Gordon	
J A N U A R Y	28	Sacred Ground	Pacific International Enterprises	Charles B. Pierce (director/screenplay); Tim McIntire, L.Q. Jones, Jack Elam, Mindi Miller, Eloy Casados	
F E B R U A R Y	4	The Entity	20th Century Fox	Sidney J. Furie (director); Frank De Felitta (screenplay); Barbara Hershey, Ron Silver, David Labiosa, George Coe, Margaret Blye, Jacqueline Brookes, Michael Alldredge, Alex Rocco, Allan Rich, Richard Brestoff, Raymond Singer, Natasha Ryan, Melanie Gaffin	
F E B R U A R Y	4	Videodrome	Universal Pictures	David Cronenberg (director/screenplay); James Woods, Deborah Harry, Sonja Smits, Peter Dvorsky, Leslie Carlson, Jack Creley, Lynne Gorman, Julie Khaner, David Bolt, Reiner Schwarz, Lally Cadeau, King Cosmos, Kay Hawtrey, David Tsubouchi	
F E B R U A R Y	4	Without a Trace	20th Century Fox	Stanley R. Jaffe (director); Beth Gutcheon (screenplay); Kate Nelligan, Judd Hirsch, David Dukes, Stockard Channing, Danny Corkill, Louise Stubbs, Keith McDermott, David Simon	
F E B R U A R Y	11	Let's Spend the Night Together	Northstar Media	Hal Ashby (director); Mick Jagger, Keith Richards, Ronnie Wood, Charlie Watts, Bill Wyman	
F E B R U A R Y	18	The King of Comedy	20th Century Fox / Embassy International Pictures	Martin Scorsese (director); Paul D. Zimmerman (screenplay); Robert De Niro, Jerry Lewis, Sandra Bernhard, Diahnne Abbott, Shelley Hack, Margo Winkler, Kim Chan, Frederick De Cordova, Edgar Scherick, Ed Herlihy, Tony Randall, Victor Borge, Joyce Brothers, Catherine Scorsese, Cathy Scorsese, Martin Scorsese, Charles Scorsese, The Clash, Kosmo Vinyl, Ellen Foley, Don Letts, Mary Elizabeth Mastrantonio	
F E B R U A R Y	18	Local Hero	Warner Bros.	Bill Forsyth (director/screenplay); Peter Riegert, Denis Lawson, Fulton Mackay, Burt Lancaster, Norman Chancer, Peter Capaldi, Rikki Fulton, Alex Norton, Jenny Seagrove, Jennifer Black, Christopher Rozycki, Christopher Asante, John Gordon Sinclair, Caroline Guthrie, John M. Jackson	
F E B R U A R Y	18	Lovesick	Warner Bros. / The Ladd Company	Marshall Brickman (director/screenplay); Dudley Moore, Elizabeth McGovern, John Huston, Alec Guinness, Wallace Shawn, Ron Silver, Alan King, Selma Diamond, Larry Rivers, David Strathairn, Christine Baranski, Renée Taylor, Fred Melamed	
F E B R U A R Y	18	The Pirates of Penzance	Universal Pictures	Wilford Leach (director/screenplay); Kevin Kline, Angela Lansbury, Linda Ronstadt, George Rose, Rex Smith, Tony Azito, David Hatton, Louise Gold, Teresa Codling, Tilly Vosburgh, Stephen Hanan, Alexandra Korey, Marcie Shaw	
F E B R U A R Y	18	The Sting II	Universal Pictures	Jeremy Paul Kagan (director); David S. Ward (screenplay); Jackie Gleason, Mac Davis, Teri Garr, Karl Malden, Oliver Reed, Ron Rifkin, José Pérez, Val Avery, Michael D. Aldredge, John Hancock, Larry Hankin, Bert Remsen, Tim Rossovich, Harry James, Woody Parfrey, Max Wright, Benny Baker, Frances Bergen, Larry Bishop, Danny Dayton, Tony Giorgio, Carl Gottlieb, Bob Minor	
F E B R U A R Y	18	Table for Five	Warner Bros. / CBS Theatrical Films	Robert Lieberman (director); David Seltzer (screenplay); Jon Voight, Marie-Christine Barrault, Millie Perkins, Richard Crenna, Roxana Zal, Robby Kiger, Son Hoang Bui, Maria O'Brien, Nelson Welch, Bernie Hern, Moria Turner, Kevin Costner, Cynthia Kania, Marion Russell, Gustaf Unger	
F E B R U A R Y	20	Betrayal	20th Century Fox	David Jones (director); Harold Pinter (screenplay); Jeremy Irons, Ben Kingsley, Patricia Hodge, Avril Elgar	
M A R C H	4	Baby It's You	Paramount Pictures	John Sayles (director/screenplay); Rosanna Arquette, Vincent Spano, Joanna Merlin, Leora Dana, Bill Raymond, Sam McMurray, Liane Curtis, Fisher Stevens, Tracy Pollan, Matthew Modine, Robert Downey Jr., Jack Davidson, Nick Ferrari, Dolores Messina, Claudia Sherman, Marta Kober, Rachel Dretzin, Susan Derendorf	
M A R C H	4	Curtains	Jensen Farley Pictures	Richard Ciupka (director); Robert Guza, Jr. (screenplay); John Vernon, Linda Thorson, Samantha Eggar, Anne Ditchburn, Lynne Griffin, Lesleh Donaldson, Michael Wincott, Maury Chaykin, Booth Savage, Sandee Currie, Deborah Burgess	
M A R C H	4	My Tutor	Crown International Pictures	George Bowers (director); Joe Roberts (screenplay); Caren Kaye, Matt Lattanzi, Kevin McCarthy, Bruce Bauer, Clark Brandon, Arlene Golonka, Crispin Glover, Jewel Shepard, John Vargas, Amber Denyse Austin, Maria Melendez, Graem McGavin	
M A R C H	4	Tender Mercies	Universal Pictures / Associated Film Distribution	Bruce Beresford (director); Horton Foote (screenplay); Robert Duvall, Tess Harper, Betty Buckley, Wilford Brimley, Ellen Barkin, Allan Hubbard, Lenny Von Dohlen, Paul Gleason, Michael Crabtree, Norman Bennett	
M A R C H	11	10 to Midnight	Cannon Films	J. Lee Thompson (director/screenplay); William Roberts (screenplay); Charles Bronson, Lisa Eilbacher, Andrew Stevens, Gene Davis, Geoffrey Lewis, Wilford Brimley, Robert F. Lyons, Bert Williams, Ola Ray, Kelly Preston, Cosie Costa, Jeana Tomasina, June Gilbert, Sam Chew Jr., Larry Caruso, Anne Lockhart	
M A R C H	11	Trenchcoat	Buena Vista Distribution	Michael Tuchner (director); Jeffrey Price, Peter S. Seaman (screenplay); Margot Kidder, Robert Hays, David Suchet, Gila von Weitershausen, Ronald Lacey, John Justin, Leopoldo Trieste, Jennifer Darling, Kevork Malikyan, Vic Tablian, Daniel Faraldo	
M A R C H	18	High Road to China	Warner Bros. / Umbrella Entertainment	Brian G. Hutton (director); Sandra Weintraub, S. Lee Pogostin (screenplay); Tom Selleck, Bess Armstrong, Jack Weston, Wilford Brimley, Robert Morley, Brian Blessed, Cassandra Gava, Michael Sheard, Lynda La Plante, Terry Richards, Robert Lee, Jeremy Child, Dino Shafeek, Anthony Chinn, Timothy Bateson, Wolf Kahler, Ric Young, Simon Prebble, Timothy Carlton, Sime Jagarinac, Domagoj Vukusic, Peggy Sirr, Shayur Mehta, Peter Llewellyn Williams, Hai Ching Lim, Chua Kahjoo, Zdenka Hersak, Marc Boyle, Kim Rook Teoh, Daniel Clucas, John Higginson	
M A R C H	23	Eddie Macon's Run	Universal Pictures	Jeff Kanew (director/screenplay); Kirk Douglas, John Schneider, Lee Purcell, Lisa Dunsheath, Leah Ayres, Tom Noonan, J.C. Quinn, Gil Rogers, Jay O. Sanders, Todd Allen, Nesbitt Blaisdell, Susan Bongard, Matthew Cowles, Vic Polizos, Bill DeWeese, John Goodman, Mark Margolis, J.T. Walsh, Dann Florek	
M A R C H	25	Bad Boys	Universal Pictures / Associated Film Distribution	Rick Rosenthal (director); Richard Di Lello (screenplay); Sean Penn, Esai Morales, Ally Sheedy, Reni Santoni, Eric Gurry, Jim Moody, Clancy Brown, Robert Lee Rush, John Zenda, Alan Ruck, Rick Rosenthal	
M A R C H	25	The Black Stallion Returns	MGM/UA Entertainment Company	Robert Dalva (director); Jerome Kass, Richard Kletter (screenplay); Kelly Reno, Vincent Spano, Allen Garfield, Woody Strode, Ferdy Mayne, Jodi Thelen, Teri Garr, Hoyt Axton, Cass Ole, El Mokhtar	
M A R C H	25	Max Dugan Returns	20th Century Fox	Herbert Ross (director); Neil Simon (screenplay); Marsha Mason, Jason Robards, Donald Sutherland, Matthew Broderick, Dody Goodman, Sal Viscuso, Panchito Gomez, Charley Lau, Kiefer Sutherland	
M A R C H	25	The Outsiders	Warner Bros.	Francis Ford Coppola (director); Kathleen Rowell (screenplay); C. Thomas Howell, Matt Dillon, Ralph Macchio, Patrick Swayze, Rob Lowe, Diane Lane, Emilio Estevez, Tom Cruise, Leif Garrett, Glenn Withrow, Darren Dalton, Michelle Meyrink, Tom Waits, William Smith, Nicolas Cage, Flea, Melanie Griffith, Trey Callaway	
M A R C H	25	Spring Break	Columbia Pictures	Sean S. Cunningham (director); David Smilow (screenplay); David Knell, Perry Lang, Paul Land, Steve Bassett, Jayne Modean, Corinne Wahl, Donald Symington, Mimi Cozzens, Richard B. Shull, Jessica James, Daniel Faraldo, Fred Buch, Jeff Garlin, Tammy Lynn Leppert	
M A R C H	25	Tough Enough	20th Century Fox	Richard Fleischer (director); John Leone (screenplay); Dennis Quaid, Stan Shaw, Carlene Watkins, Pam Grier, Warren Oates, Wilford Brimley, Steve "Monk" Miller, Big John Hamilton	
M A R C H	27	The Thorn Birds	ABC / Warner Bros. Television Distribution / David Wolper-Stan Margulies Productions / Edward Lewis Productions	Daryl Duke (director); Carmen Culver, Lee Stanley (screenplay); Richard Chamberlain, Rachel Ward, Barbara Stanwyck, Christopher Plummer, Jean Simmons, Bryan Brown, Philip Anglim, Richard Kiley, Piper Laurie, Mare Winningham, Ken Howard, John Friedrich, Dwier Brown, Earl Holliman, Brett Cullen, Stephen W. Burns, Barry Corbin, Holly Palance, John de Lancie, Allyn Ann McLerie, Richard Venture, Stephanie Faracy, Antoinette Bower, Sydney Penny, Vidal Peterson	
M A R C H	31	Monty Python's The Meaning of Life	Universal Pictures	Terry Jones (director); Monty Python (screenplay); Graham Chapman, John Cleese, Terry Gilliam, Eric Idle, Terry Jones, Michael Palin, Carol Cleveland, Simon Jones, Patricia Quinn, Judy Loe, Matt Frewer, John Scott Martin, Andrew Bicknell, Mark Holmes, Valerie Whittington	

== April–June ==
Opening		Title	Production company	Cast and crew	Ref.
A P R I L	1	Heart Like a Wheel	20th Century Fox	Jonathan Kaplan (director); Ken Friedman, David E. Peckinpah (screenplay); Bonnie Bedelia, Beau Bridges, Leo Rossi, Hoyt Axton, Bill McKinney, Anthony Edwards, Tiffany Brisette, Leonard Termo	
A P R I L	1	Screwballs	New World Pictures	Rafal Zielinski (director); Linda Shayne, Jim Wynorski (screenplay); Peter Keleghan, Lynda Speciale, Linda Shayne, Kent Deuters	
A P R I L	6	Conquest	Clemi Cinematgorafica / Golden Sun Producciones Esme	Lucio Fulci (director); Gino Capone, Carlos Vasallo, Jose Antonio de la Loma (screenplay); Andrea Occhipinti, Jorge Rivero, Conrado San Martin, Sabrina Siani, José Gras Palau, Violeta Cela, Gioia Maria Scola	
A P R I L	11	Flashdance	Paramount Pictures	Adrian Lyne (director); Tom Hedley, Joe Eszterhas (screenplay); Jennifer Beals, Michael Nouri, Lilia Skala, Sunny Johnson, Kyle T. Heffner, Lee Ving, Ron Karabatsos, Belinda Bauer, Malcolm Danare, Phil Bruns, Micole Mercurio, Lucy Lee Flippin, Don Brockett, Cynthia Rhodes, Durga McBroom, Liz Sagal, Marine Jahan, Stacey Pickren, Bob Harks, Jumbo Red	
A P R I L	15	Liquid Sky	Cinevista / Media Home Entertainment	Slava Tsukerman (director/screenplay); Anne Carlisle, Nina V. Kerova (screenplay); Anne Carlisle, Paula E. Sheppard, Susan Doukas, Otto von Wernherr, Bob Brady, Elaine C. Grove, Stanley Knap, Jack Adalist, Lloyd Ziff, Harry Lum, Roy MacArthur, Sara Carlisle, Nina V. Kerova, Alan Preston, Christine Hatfull	
A P R I L	15	Lone Wolf McQuade	Orion Pictures	Steve Carver (director); H. Kaye Dyal, B.J. Nelson (screenplay); Chuck Norris, David Carradine, Barbara Carrera, Leon Isaac Kennedy, L.Q. Jones, Robert Beltran, Dana Kimmell, R.G. Armstrong, Sharon Farrell, William Sanderson, Jorge Cervera Jr., Daniel Frishman	
A P R I L	22	Exposed	MGM/UA Entertainment Company / United Artists	James Toback (director/screenplay); Nastassja Kinski, Rudolf Nureyev, Harvey Keitel, Ian McShane, Bibi Andersson, Ron Randell, Pierre Clémenti, James Russo, Tony Sirico, James Toback, Amy Steel, Janice Dickinson, Iman	
A P R I L	22	The Deadly Spawn	21st Century Film Corporation	Douglas McKeown (director/screenplay); Charles George Hildebrandt, Tom DeFranco, Richard Lee Porter, Jean Tafler, Karen Tighe, James Brewster, Elissa Neil, Ethel Michelson, John Schmerling	
A P R I L	22	Losin' It	Embassy Pictures Corporation / Tiberius Film Productions / Tijuana Productions	Curtis Hanson (director); Bill L. Norton (screenplay); Tom Cruise, Jackie Earle Haley, John Stockwell, Shelley Long, John P. Navin Jr., Henry Darrow, Hector Elias, Mario Marcelino, John Valby, Rick Rossovich, Kale Browne, Santos Morales	
A P R I L	29	The Hunger	MGM/UA Entertainment Co.	Tony Scott (director); Ivan Davis, Michael Thomas (screenplay); Catherine Deneuve, David Bowie, Susan Sarandon, Cliff De Young, Dan Hedaya, Beth Ehlers, Rufus Collins, Willem Dafoe, John Pankow, John Stephen Hill, Ann Magnuson, James Aubrey, Bauhaus, Bessie Love	
A P R I L	29	Something Wicked This Way Comes	Buena Vista Distribution / Walt Disney Productions / The Bryna Company	Jack Clayton (director); Ray Bradbury (screenplay); Jason Robards, Jonathan Pryce, Diane Ladd, Pam Grier, Royal Dano, Vidal Peterson, Arthur Hill, Shawn Carson, Mary Grace Canfield, Richard Davalos, Jack Dodson, Bruce M. Fischer, Jack Dengel, Ellen Geer, James Stacy, Angelo Rossitto, Sharan Lea, Tony Christopher	
A P R I L	29	Valley Girl	Atlantic Releasing / Valley 9000	Martha Coolidge (director); Wayne Crawford, Andrew Lane (screenplay); Nicolas Cage, Deborah Foreman, Elizabeth Daily, Heidi Holicker, Michael Bowen, Cameron Dye, Michelle Meyrink, Lee Purcell, Richard Sanders, Colleen Camp, Frederic Forrest, Joyce Hyser	
M A Y	1	The Final Terror	Comworld Pictures	Andrew Davis (director); Jon George, Neill D. Hicks, Ronald Shusett (screenplay); Rachel Ward, Daryl Hannah, Adrian Zmed, John Friedrich, Mark Metcalf, Joe Pantoliano, Akosua Busia, Lewis Smith, Jim Youngs, Ernest Harden Jr., Cindy Harrell, Irene Sanders, Richard Jacobs, Donna Pinder, Lori Lee Butler, Tony Maccario	
M A Y	1	V	NBC / Warner Bros. Television / Kenneth Johnson Productions	Kenneth Johnson (director/screenplay); Jane Badler, Frank Ashmore, Bonnie Bartlett, Diane Cary, Michael Durrell, Robert Englund, Faye Grant, Richard Herd, Richard Lawson, Peter Nelson, David Packer, Neva Patterson, Andrew Prine, Marc Singer, Jenny Sullivan, Blair Tefkin, Penelope Windust, Michael Wright, Jason Bernard, Viveka Davis, Leonardo Cimino, George Morfogen, Camila Ashland, Hansford Rowe, Evan C. Kim, Rafael Campos, William Russ, Stack Pierce, Eric Johnston, Jenny Neumann, Greta Blackburn	
M A Y	6	Still Smokin	Paramount Pictures	Tommy Chong (director/screenplay); Cheech Marin (screenplay); Cheech Marin, Tommy Chong	
M A Y	6	Doctor Detroit	Universal Studios / Brillstein Company	Michael Pressman (director); Bruce Jay Friedman, Carl Gottlieb, Robert Boris (screenplay); Dan Aykroyd, Howard Hesseman, George Furth, James Brown, T.K. Carter, Donna Dixon, Fran Drescher, Lydia Lei, Lynn Whitfield, Kate Murtagh, Nan Martin, Peter Aykroyd, Glenne Headly, Robert Cornthwaite, Parley Baer, John Kapelos, Steven Williams, Andrew Duggan, Blackie Dammett, Cacey Kustosz	
M A Y	13	Blue Thunder	Columbia Pictures / Rastar	John Badham (director); Dan O'Bannon, Don Jakoby (screenplay); Roy Scheider, Warren Oates, Candy Clark, Daniel Stern, Malcolm McDowell, Joe Santos, Paul Roebling, David Sheiner, Anthony James, Ed Bernard, Jason Bernard, Mario Machado, Jack Murdock, James Murtaugh, Pat McNamara, Clifford A. Pellow, Robin Braxton	
M A Y	16	Deadly Eyes	Warner Bros. / Golden Harvest	Robert Clouse (director); Charles H. Eglee, James Herbert (screenplay); Sam Groom, Scatman Crothers, Sara Botsford, Cec Linder, Lisa Langlois, Lesleh Donaldson	
M A Y	17	Nostalghia	Gaumont / RAI 2 / Gaumont Italia / Grange Communications, Inc. / Sovinfilm	Andrei Tarkovsky (director/screenplay); Tonino Guerra (screenplay); Oleg Yankovsky, Erland Josephson, Domiziana Giordano, Delia Boccardo, Patrizia Terreno, Laura De Marchi	
M A Y	18	Moon in the Gutter		Jean-Jacques Beineix (director/screenplay); Olivier Mergault, David Goodis (screenplay); Gérard Depardieu, Nastassja Kinski, Victoria Abril, Bertice Reading, Gabriel Monnet, Dominique Pinon, Milena Vukotic, Vittorio Mezzogiorno, Bernard Farcy, Anne-Marie Coffinet, Katya Berger, Jacques Herlin, Guido Alberti	
M A Y	20	Bill Cosby: Himself	20th Century Fox / Jemmin, Inc.	Bill Cosby (director/screenplay); Bill Cosby	
M A Y	20	Eureka	MGM/UA Entertainment Company / Recorded Picture Company / JF Productions / Sunley Productions	Nicolas Roeg (director); Paul Mayersberg (screenplay); Gene Hackman, Theresa Russell, Rutger Hauer, Jane Lapotaire, Mickey Rourke, Ed Lauter, Joe Pesci, Joe Spinell, James Faulkner, Corin Redgrave, Helena Kallianiotes	
M A Y	20	The Mack (re-release)	Cinerama Releasing Corporation	Michael Campus (director); Robert J. Poole (screenplay); Max Julien, Richard Pryor, Carol Speed, Roger E. Mosley, George Murdock	
M A Y	20	Spacehunter: Adventures in the Forbidden Zone	Columbia Pictures	Lamont Johnson (director); David Preston, Edith Rey, Daniel Goldberg, Len Blum (screenplay); Peter Strauss, Molly Ringwald, Ernie Hudson, Michael Ironside, Andrea Marcovicci, Beeson Carroll, Hrant Alianak, Deborah Pratt, Aleisa Shirley, Cali Timmins, Reggie Bennett, Harold Ramis	
M A Y	25	Return of the Jedi	20th Century Fox / Lucasfilm	Richard Marquand (director); Lawrence Kasdan, George Lucas (screenplay); Mark Hamill, Harrison Ford, Carrie Fisher, Billy Dee Williams, Anthony Daniels, David Prowse, James Earl Jones, Ian McDiarmid, Kenny Baker, Peter Mayhew, Frank Oz, Alec Guinness, Sebastian Shaw, Michael Pennington, Kenneth Colley, Michael Carter, Denis Lawson, Tim Rose, Dermot Crowley, Caroline Blakiston, Warwick Davis, Jeremy Bulloch, Femi Taylor, Annie Arbogast, Jack Purvis, Mike Edmonds, Jane Busby, Nicki Reade, Debbie Lee Carrington, Sadie Corre, Tony Cox, Phil Fondacaro, Ben Burtt, Richard Marquand, Mike Quinn, Deep Roy, Phil Tippett, Larry Ward, Robert Watts	
M A Y	27	Chained Heat	Jensen Farley Pictures / Intercontinental / TAT Filmproduktion	Paul Nicholas (director/screenplay); Aaron Butler (screenplay); Linda Blair, John Vernon, Sybil Danning, Tamara Dobson, Stella Stevens, Sharon Hughes, Henry Silva, Edy Williams, Nita Talbot, Louisa Moritz, Michael Callan, Greta Blackburn, Kate Vernon	
J U N E	3	The Man with Two Brains	Warner Bros. / Aspen Film Society	Carl Reiner (director/screenplay); Steve Martin, George Gipe (screenplay); Steve Martin, Kathleen Turner, David Warner, Paul Benedict, George Furth, Peter Hobbs, Earl Boen, Randi Brooks, James Cromwell, Frank McCarthy, Estelle Reiner, Merv Griffin, Jeffrey Combs, Sissy Spacek	
J U N E	3	Psycho II	Universal Pictures / Oak Industries	Richard Franklin (director); Tom Holland (screenplay); Anthony Perkins, Vera Miles, Meg Tilly, Robert Loggia, Dennis Franz, Hugh Gillin, Robert Alan Browne, Claudia Bryar, Ben Hartigan, Lee Garlington, Jill Caroll	
J U N E	3	WarGames	MGM/UA Entertainment Company / United Artists / Sherwood Productions	John Badham (director); Lawrence Lasker, Walter F. Parkes (screenplay); Matthew Broderick, Dabney Coleman, John Wood, Ally Sheedy, Barry Corbin, Juanin Clay, Dennis Lipscomb, Kent Williams, Michael Ensign, William Bogert, John Spencer, Michael Madsen, Alan Blumenfeld, James Tolkan, Drew Snyder, Maury Chaykin, Eddie Deezen, Jason Bernard, Jesse D. Goins, Stephen Lee, Art LaFleur, Stack Pierce, Michael Adams, William H. Macy, Joe Dorsey, Susan Davis, Irving Metzman	
J U N E	8	Trading Places	Paramount Pictures	John Landis (director); Timothy Harris, Herschel Weingrod (screenplay); Dan Aykroyd, Eddie Murphy, Ralph Bellamy, Don Ameche, Denholm Elliott, Jamie Lee Curtis, Paul Gleason, Robert Curtis Brown, Alfred Drake, Jim Belushi, Bo Diddley, Kelly Curtis, Frank Oz, Richard Hunt, Tom Davis, Al Franken, Ron Taylor, J.T. Turner, Giancarlo Esposito, Avon Long, Kristin Holby, Don McLeod	
J U N E	10	Octopussy	United Artists / Eon Productions	John Glen (director); George MacDonald Fraser, Richard Maibaum, Michael G. Wilson (screenplay); Roger Moore, Maud Adams, Louis Jourdan, Kristina Wayborn, Kabir Bedi, Steven Berkoff, David Meyer, Anthony Meyer, Desmond Llewelyn, Robert Brown, Lois Maxwell, Michaela Clavell, Walter Gotell, Vijay Amritraj, Geoffrey Keen, Douglas Wilmer, Albert Moses, Paul Hardwick, Eva Rueber-Staier, Peter Porteous, Andy Bradford, Gary Russell	
J U N E	17	Superman III	Warner Bros. / Dovemead Ltd.	Richard Lester (director); David Newman, Leslie Newman (screenplay); Christopher Reeve, Richard Pryor, Jackie Cooper, Marc McClure, Annette O'Toole, Annie Ross, Pamela Stephenson, Robert Vaughn, Margot Kidder, Gavan O'Herlihy, Shane Rimmer, Pamela Mandell	
J U N E	22	The Survivors	Columbia Pictures	Michael Ritchie (director); Michael Lesson (screenplay); Walter Matthau, Robin Williams, Jerry Reed, Kristen Vigard, James Wainwright, Skipp Lynch, Annie McEnroe, John Goodman, Marian Hailey, Joseph Carberry, Meg Mundy, Marilyn Cooper	
J U N E	24	Porky's II: The Next Day	20th Century Fox / Astral Films	Bob Clark (director/screenplay); Roger Swaybill, Alan Ormsby (screenplay); Dan Monahan, Wyatt Knight, Mark Herrier, Roger Wilson, Cyril O'Reilly, Tony Ganios, Kaki Hunter, Scott Colomby, Nancy Parsons, Joseph Runningfox, Eric Christmas, Bill Wiley, Edward Winter, Ilse Earl, Cisse Cameron, Art Hindle, Jack Mulcahy, Bill Hindman, Mal Jones, Richard Liberty, Fred Buch, Will Knickerbocker	
J U N E	24	Twilight Zone: The Movie	Warner Bros.	John Landis (director/screenplay); Steven Spielberg, Joe Dante, George Miller (directors); George Clayton Johnson, Richard Matheson, Melissa Mathison (screenplay); Dan Aykroyd, Albert Brooks, Scatman Crothers, John Lithgow, Vic Morrow, Kathleen Quinlan, Doug McGrath, Charles Hallahan, Kai Wulff, Steven Williams, Al Leong, Stephen Bishop, Thomas Byrd, John Larroquette, Bill Quinn, Selma Diamond, Helen Shaw, Murray Matheson, Peter Brocco, Priscilla Pointer, Elsa Raven, Jeremy Licht, Kevin McCarthy, Patricia Barry, William Schallert, Nancy Cartwright, Dick Miller, Cherie Currie, Bill Mumy, Abbe Lane, Donna Dixon, John Dennis Johnston, Larry Cedar, Christina Nigra, Eduard Franz, Jeffrey Weissman, Alan Haufrect, Jeffrey Bannister, Martin Garner, Scott Nemes, Tanya Fenmore, Evan Richards, Laura Mooney, Christopher Eisenmann, Richard Swingler, Cheryl Socher, Rainer Peets, Sue Dugan, Debby Porter, Annette Claudier, Joseph Hieu, Myca Dinh Le, Renee Shin-Yi Chen, Vincent J. Isaac, Bill Taylor, William S. Taylor, Eddy Donno, Michael Milgron, Norbert Weisser, Charles Knapp, Byron McFarland, Lana Schwab, Margaret Wheeler, Margaret Fitzgerald, Carol Serling, Jeffrey Lampert, Frank Toth	
J U N E	24	Yellowbeard	Orion Pictures / Hemdale Film Corporation	Mel Damski (director); Graham Chapman, Peter Cook, Bernard McKenna, David Sherlock (screenplay); Graham Chapman, Peter Boyle, Cheech Marin, Tommy Chong, Peter Cook, Marty Feldman, Martin Hewitt, Michael Hordern, Eric Idle, Madeline Kahn, James Mason, John Cleese, Kenneth Mars, Spike Milligan, Stacey Nelkin, Nigel Planer, Susannah York, Beryl Reid, Ferdy Mayne, Peter Bull, Bernard Fox, Nigel Stock, Monte Landis, David Bowie, Greta Blackburn	

== July–September ==
Opening		Title	Production company	Cast and crew	Ref.
J U L Y	1	Stroker Ace	Universal Pictures / Warner Bros. / Yahi Productions	Hal Needham (director/screenplay); Hugh Wilson (screenplay); Burt Reynolds, Ned Beatty, Jim Nabors, Parker Stevenson, Loni Anderson, John Byner, Frank O. Hill, Cassandra Peterson, Bubba Smith, Warren Stevens, Alfie Wise, Cary Guffey, Dale Earnhardt, Richard Petty, Neil Bonnett, Harry Gant, Terry Labonte, Kyle Petty, Benny Parsons, Tim Richmond, Ricky Rudd, Cale Yarborough, Ken Squier, David Hobbs, Chris Economaki	
J U L Y	6	Class	Orion Pictures	Lewis John Carlino (director); Jim Kouf, David Greenwalt (screenplay); Rob Lowe, Jacqueline Bisset, Andrew McCarthy, Cliff Robertson, Stuart Margolin, John Cusack, Alan Ruck, Rodney Pearson, Remak Ramsay, Virginia Madsen, Fern Persons, Casey Siemaszko, Aaron Douglas, Anna Maria Horsford, Dick Cusack, Joan Cusack, John Kapelos, Lance Kinsey, Lolita Davidovich, Sue Snyder, Meg Thalken	
J U L Y	15	Staying Alive	Paramount Pictures / RSO Records	Sylvester Stallone (director/screenplay); Norman Wexler (screenplay); John Travolta, Cynthia Rhodes, Finola Hughes, Steve Inwood, Julie Bovasso, Charles Ward, Norma Donaldson, Jesse Doran, Joyce Hyser, Frank Stallone, Kurtwood Smith, Sylvester Stallone	
J U L Y	15	Zelig	Warner Bros. / Orion Pictures	Woody Allen (director/screenplay); Woody Allen, Mia Farrow, Mary Louise Wilson, John Rothman, Deborah Rush, Will Holt, Peter McRobbie, Susan Sontag, Irving Howe, Saul Bellow, Bricktop, Bruno Bettelheim, Professor John Morton Blum, Charles Lindbergh, Al Capone, Clara Bow, William Randolph Hearst, Marion Davies, Charlie Chaplin, Josephine Baker, Fanny Brice, Carole Lombard, Dolores del Río, Adolf Hitler, Joseph Goebbels, Hermann Göring, James Cagney, Jimmy Walker, Lou Gehrig, Babe Ruth, Adolphe Menjou, Claire Windsor, Tom Mix, Marie Dressler, Bobby Jones, Pope Pius XI	
J U L Y	22	Jaws 3-D	Universal Pictures / Alan Landsburg Productions / MCA Theatricals	Joe Alves (director); Richard Matheson, Carl Gottlieb (screenplay); Dennis Quaid, Bess Armstrong, Simon MacCorkindale, Louis Gossett Jr., John Putch, Lea Thompson, P.H. Moriarty, Kaye Stevens, Dan Blasko, Liz Morris, Harry Grant, Lisa Maurer	
J U L Y	22	Mr. Mom	20th Century Fox / Sherwood Productions	Stan Dragoti (director); John Hughes (screenplay); Michael Keaton, Teri Garr, Martin Mull, Ann Jillian, Christopher Lloyd, Frederick Koehler, Taliesin Jaffe, Courtney and Brittany White, Jeffrey Tambor, Graham Jarvis, Miriam Flynn, Carolyn Seymour, Patti Deutsch	
J U L Y	29	Krull	Columbia Pictures / Barclays Mercantile / Industrial Finance	Peter Yates (director); Stanford Sherman (screenplay); Ken Marshall, Lysette Anthony, Freddie Jones, Francesca Annis, Trevor Martin, David Battley, Bernard Bresslaw, Alun Armstrong, Liam Neeson, Robbie Coltrane, Michael Elphick, Dicken Ashworth, Todd Carty, Bronco McLoughlin, Gerard Naprous, Andy Bradford, Bill Weston, John Welsh, Graham McGrath, Tony Church, Clare McIntyre, Belinda Mayne	
J U L Y	29	National Lampoon's Vacation	Warner Bros.	Harold Ramis (director); John Hughes (screenplay); Chevy Chase, Beverly D'Angelo, Imogene Coca, Randy Quaid, John Candy, Christie Brinkley, Anthony Michael Hall, Dana Barron, Miriam Flynn, Eddie Bracken, Brian Doyle-Murray, James Keach, Eugene Levy, Frank McRae, Jane Krakowski, John P. Navin Jr., Mickey Jones, John Diehl, Harold Ramis, Violet Ramis, James Staley	
J U L Y	29	Private School	Universal Pictures	Noel Black (director); Dan Greenburg, Suzanne O'Malley (screenplay); Phoebe Cates, Betsy Russell, Matthew Modine, Michael Zorek, Ray Walston, Sylvia Kristel, Fran Ryan, Kathleen Wilhoite, Jonathan Prince, Kari Lizer, Julie Payne, Frank Aletter, Frances Bay, Lynda Wiesmeier	
A U G U S T	5	Daffy Duck's Fantastic Island	Warner Bros. / Warner Bros. Animation	Chuck Jones, Phil Monroe, Robert McKimson (directors); Friz Freleng (director/screenplay); Mel Blanc, June Foray, Les Tremayne	
A U G U S T	5	Get Crazy	Embassy Pictures	Allan Arkush (director); Danny Opatoshu, Henry Rosenbaum, David Taylor (screenplay); Malcolm McDowell, Allen Garfield, Daniel Stern, Gail Edwards, Ed Begley Jr., Miles Chapin, Stacey Nelkin, Bill Henderson, Lou Reed, Howard Kaylan, Lori Eastside, Lee Ving, John Densmore, Anna Bjorn, Robert Picardo, Bobby Sherman, Fabian Forte, Franklyn Ajaye, Paul Bartel, Dan Frischman, Mary Woronov, Clint Howard, Denise Galik, Linnea Quigley, Jackie Joseph, Dick Miller, Chuck Hanson, Susan Saiger, Barry Diamond	
A U G U S T	5	Risky Business	The Geffen Film Company	Paul Brickman (director/screenplay); Tom Cruise, Rebecca De Mornay, Joe Pantoliano, Nicholas Pryor, Janet Carroll, Richard Masur, Curtis Armstrong, Bronson Pinchot, Shera Danese, Raphael Sbarge, Bruce A. Young, Kevin Anderson, Nathan Davis, Fern Persons, Anne Lockhart	
A U G U S T	5	The Star Chamber	20th Century Fox / Frank Yablans Presentations	Peter Hyams (director/screenplay); Roderick Taylor (screenplay); Michael Douglas, Hal Holbrook, Yaphet Kotto, Sharon Gless, James B. Sikking, Joe Regalbuto, Don Calfa, David Faustino, Larry Hankin, Dick Anthony Williams, DeWayne Jessie, David Proval, Michael Ensign, Diana Douglas, Frances Bergen, Robert Costanzo	
A U G U S T	5	Twice Upon a Time	Warner Bros. / Korty Films / Lucasfilm / The Ladd Company	John Korty, Charles Swenson (directors/screenplay); Suella Kennedy, Bill Couturié (screenplay); Lorenzo Music, Julie Payne, James Cranna, Hamilton Camp, Marshall Efron, Paul Frees, Judith Kahan Kampmann	
A U G U S T	12	Cujo	Warner Bros. / Taft Entertainment / Sunn Classic Pictures	Lewis Teague (director); Don Carlos Dunaway, Barbara Turner (screenplay); Dee Wallace, Daniel Hugh-Kelly, Danny Pintauro, Christopher Stone, Ed Lauter, Kaiulani Lee, Billy Jacoby, Mills Watson, Jerry Hardin, Sandy Ward, Arthur Rosenberg	
A U G U S T	12	Curse of the Pink Panther	MGM/UA Entertainment Company / United Artists / Blake Edwards Entertainment / Tilt Productions Inc.	Blake Edwards (director/screenplay); Geoffrey Edwards (screenplay); Ted Wass, Herbert Lom, David Niven, Robert Wagner, Capucine, Robert Loggia, Joanna Lumley, André Maranne, Burt Kwouk, Harvey Korman, Leslie Ash, Ed Parker, Bill Nighy, Roger Moore, Liz Smith, Michael Elphick, Hugh Fraser, Joe Morton, Denise Crosby, Peter Arne	
A U G U S T	12	The Man Who Wasn't There	Paramount Pictures	Bruce Malmuth (director); Stanford Sherman (screenplay); Steve Guttenberg, Jeffrey Tambor, Art Hindle, Morgan Hart, Lisa Langlois, William Forsythe, Ron Canada, Michael Ensign, Richard Paul, Miguel Ferrer	
A U G U S T	12	Smokey and the Bandit Part 3	Universal Pictures	Dick Lowry (director); Stuart Birnbaum, David Dashev (screenplay); Jackie Gleason, Paul Williams, Pat McCormick, Jerry Reed, Mike Henry, Colleen Camp, Faith Minton, Burt Reynolds, Ava Cadell, Dick Lowry, Jackie Davis, Raymond Forchion	
A U G U S T	15	Prisoners of the Lost Universe	Premier Releasing / Marcel/Robertson / United Media Finance Ltd.	Terry Marcel (director); Richard Hatch, Kay Lenz, John Saxon, Bill Flynn, Danie Voges, Peter O'Farrell, Ray Charleson, Kenneth Hendel, Philip Van der Byl, Dawn Abraham, Ron Smerczac, Charles Comyn, Ian Steadman, Myles Robertson	
A U G U S T	19	Easy Money	Orion Pictures	James Signorelli (director); Dennis Blair, Rodney Dangerfield, Michael Endler, P.J. O'Rourke (screenplay); Rodney Dangerfield, Joe Pesci, Geraldine Fitzgerald, Candice Azzara, Jennifer Jason Leigh, Jeffrey Jones, Taylor Negron, Tom Noonan, Val Avery, Tom Ewell, Lili Haydn, Kimberly McArthur, Jeffrey Altman, Arch Johnson, Mary Pat Gleason	
A U G U S T	19	Metalstorm: The Destruction of Jared-Syn	Universal Pictures / Arista Films	Charles Band (director); Alan J. Adler (screenplay); Jeffrey Byron, Mike Preston, Tim Thomerson, Kelly Preston, Richard Moll, R. David Smith, Larry Pennel, Marty Zagon, Mickey Fox	
A U G U S T	19	Yor, the Hunter from the Future	Diamant Film / RAI-Radio Televisione Italiana	Antonio Margheriti (director/screenplay); Robert Bailey (screenplay); Reb Brown, Corinne Cléry, John Steiner, Carole André, Ayshe Gul, Aytekin Akkaya, Sergio Nicolai	
A U G U S T	26	Daniel	Paramount Pictures	Sidney Lumet (director); E.L. Doctorow (screenplay); Timothy Hutton, Mandy Patinkin, Lindsay Crouse, Edward Asner, Peter Friedman, Lee Richardson, Carmen Mathews, Tovah Feldshuh, Ellen Barkin, Amanda Plummer, Julie Bovasso, John Rubinstein, Colin Stinton, Maria Tucci, Ilan Mitchell-Smith, Will Lee, David Margulies, Leo Burmester, Rosetta LeNoire, Ron McLarty, Daniel Stern, Lee Wallace, Norman Parker, Joseph Leon, Rita Zohar, Jena Greco, Dael Cohen, Sonia Zomina	
A U G U S T	26	Fire and Ice	20th Century Fox / Producers Sales Organization	Ralph Bakshi (director); Gerry Conway, Roy Thomas (screenplay); Susan Tyrrell, Maggie Roswell, Steve Sandor, Leo Gordon, James Bridges, Nathan Purdee, Le Tari, William Ostrander, Stephen Mendel, Elizabeth Lloyd Shaw, Micky Morton, Clare Nono, Big Yank, Greg Wayne Elam, Alan Koss, Hans Howes, Shane Callan, Archie Hamilton, Michael Kellogg, Douglas Payton, Dale Park, Ray Oliver	
A U G U S T	26	Hercules	Cannon Italia SrL / Golan-Globus	Luigi Cozzi (director/screenplay); Lou Ferrigno, Sybil Danning, Brad Harris, Ingrid Anderson, Rossana Podestà, Mirella D'Angelo, William Berger, Bobby Rhodes, Gianni Garko, Yehuda Efroni, Delia Boccardo, Claudio Cassinelli, Frank Garland, Gabriella Giorgelli, Ralph Baldassar, Eva Robin's	
A U G U S T	26	Strange Brew	MGM/UA Entertainment Co.	Rick Moranis, Dave Thomas (directors/screenplay); Steve De Jarnatt (screenplay); Dave Thomas, Rick Moranis, Paul Dooley, Max von Sydow, Lynne Griffin, Angus MacInnes, Mel Blanc, Douglas Campbell, Tom Harvey, Len Doncheff, Chris Benson	
A U G U S T	28	Young Warriors	Cannon Home Video / Star Cinema Productions / Cannon Films	Lawrence D. Foldes (director/screenplay); Russell W. Colgin (screenplay); Ernest Borgnine, Richard Roundtree, Lynda Day George, James Van Patten, Anne Lockhart, Tom Reilly, Ed De Stefane, Dick Shawn, Mike Norris, Linnea Quigley	
S E P T E M B E R	2	Escape from the Bronx	Fulvia Film	Enzo G. Castellari (director/screenplay); Tito Carpi (screenplay); Mark Gregory, Timothy Brent, Valeria D'Obici, Henry Silva, Antonio Sabato, Enio Girolami, Paolo Malco, Eva Czemerys, Alessandro Prete, Moana Pozzi, Carla Brait, Massimo Vanni, Enzo G. Castellari	
S E P T E M B E R	2	Merry Christmas, Mr. Lawrence	Universal Pictures / Recorded Picture Company / Oshima Productions	Nagisa Ōshima (director/screenplay); Paul Mayersberg (screenplay); David Bowie, Tom Conti, Ryuichi Sakamoto, Takeshi Kitano, Jack Thompson, Alistair Browning, Yuya Uchida, Rokko Toura, Kan Mikami, Hideo Murota, Johnny Okura, James Malcolm, Ryunosuke Kaneda, Takashi Naitō, Tamio Ishikura	
S E P T E M B E R	2	Mortuary	Citadel Films / Artists Releasing Corporation / Film Ventures International	Howard Avedis (director/screenplay); Mary McDonough, David Wallace, Bill Paxton, Lynda Day George, Christopher George, Alvy Moore, Marlene Schmidt, Bill Conklin, Curt Ayers, Donna Garrett, Danny Rogers, Greg Kaye, Denis Mandel	
S E P T E M B E R	5	Streamers	United Artists	Robert Altman (director); David Rabe (screenplay); Matthew Modine, Michael Wright, Mitchell Lichtenstein, David Allen Grier, Guy Boyd	
S E P T E M B E R	9	Nightmares	Universal Pictures	Joseph Sargent (director); Jeffrey Bloom, Christopher Crowe (screenplay); Emilio Estevez, Cristina Raines, Lance Henriksen, Richard Masur, Veronica Cartwright, Anthony James, William Sanderson, Lee Ving, Clare Nono, Louis Giambalvo, Mariclare Costello, Moon Unit Zappa, Billy Jayne, James Tolkan, Tony Plana, Timothy Scott, Robin Gammell, Rose Mary Campos, Bridgette Andersen, Albert Hague	
S E P T E M B E R	16	Heat and Dust	Universal Studios / Curzon Film Distributors / Merchant Ivory Productions	James Ivory (director); Ruth Prawer Jhabvala (screenplay); Greta Scacchi, Shashi Kapoor, Julie Christie, Christopher Cazenove, Nickolas Grace, Zakir Hussain, Julian Glover, Susan Fleetwood, Patrick Godfrey, Jennifer Kendal, Charles McCaughan, Madhur Jaffrey, Barry Foster	
S E P T E M B E R	16	Revenge of the Ninja	MGM/UA Entertainment Co. / The Cannon Group	Sam Firstenberg (director); James Silke (screenplay); Sho Kosugi, Keith Vitali, Virgil Frye, Kane Kosugi, Professor Toru Tanaka, Arthur Roberts, Ashley Ferrare, Mario Gallo, Grace Oshita, John LaMotta	
S E P T E M B E R	16	Strange Invaders	Orion Pictures / EMI Films	Michael Laughlin (director/screenplay); Bill Condon, Walter Halsey Davis (screenplay); Paul Le Mat, Nancy Allen, Diana Scarwid, Michael Lerner, Louise Fletcher, Wallace Shawn, Fiona Lewis, Kenneth Tobey, June Lockhart, Charles Lane, Lulu Sylbert, Joel Cohen, Dan Shor, Dey Young, Jack Kehler, Mark Goddard, Thomas Kopache, Bobby Pickett	
S E P T E M B E R	16	Vigilante	Artists Releasing Corporation / Magnum Motion Pictures Inc.	William Lustig (director); Richard Vetere (screenplay); Robert Forster, Fred Williamson, Richard Bright, Rutanya Alda, Don Blakely, Joseph Carberry, Willie Colón, Joe Spinell, Carol Lynley, Woody Strode, Steve James, Vincent Beck, Frank Pesce	
S E P T E M B E R	23	Eddie and the Cruisers	Embassy Pictures / Aurora Productions	Martin Davidson (director/screenplay); Arlene Davidson (screenplay); Tom Berenger, Michael Paré, Joe Pantoliano, Matthew Laurance, Helen Schneider, David Wilson, Michael "Tunes" Antunes, Ellen Barkin, Kenny Vance	
S E P T E M B E R	23	Pieces	International Films Distribution / Artists Releasing Corporation / Film Ventures International / Almena Films / Fort Films / Spectacular Film Productions	J. Piquer Simon (director); Dick Randall, Roberto Loyola (screenplay); Christopher George, Linda Day, Frank Braña, Ian Sera, Edmund Purdom, Paul L. Smith, Jack Taylor, Isabelle Luque, Gérard Tichy, Hilda Fuchs, May Heatherly, Alejandro Hernández, Roxana Nieto, Cristina Cottrelli, Leticia Marfil, Silvia Gambino, Carmen Aguado, Paco Alvez	
S E P T E M B E R	30	The Big Chill	Columbia Pictures / Carson Productions	Lawrence Kasdan (director/screenplay); Barbara Benedek (screenplay); Tom Berenger, Glenn Close, Jeff Goldblum, William Hurt, Kevin Kline, Mary Kay Place, Meg Tilly, JoBeth Williams, Don Galloway, Kevin Costner, James Gillis, Ken Place	
S E P T E M B E R	30	Brainstorm	MGM/UA Entertainment Company	Douglas Trumbull (director); Philip Frank Messina, Robert Stitzel (screenplay); Christopher Walken, Natalie Wood, Louise Fletcher, Cliff Robertson, Jordan Christopher, Donald Hotton, Alan Fudge, Joe Dorsey, Bill Morey, Jason Lively, Georgianne Walken	
S E P T E M B E R	30	Going Berserk	Universal Pictures	David Steinberg (director/screenplay); Dana Olsen (screenplay); John Candy, Joe Flaherty, Eugene Levy, Alley Mills, Pat Hingle, Richard Libertini, Paul Dooley, Dixie Carter, Murphy Dunne, Bill Saluga, Ernie Hudson, Kurtwood Smith, Julius Harris, Elinor Donahue, Eve Brent Ashe, Ann Bronston, Kathy Bendett, Elizabeth Kerr, Dan Barrows, Brenda Currin, Frantz Turner, Gloria Gifford	
S E P T E M B E R	30	The Honorary Consul	Paramount Pictures	John Mackenzie (director); Christopher Hampton (screenplay); Michael Caine, Richard Gere, Bob Hoskins, Elpidia Carrillo, Joaquim de Almeida, A Martinez, Geoffrey Palmer	
S E P T E M B E R	30	The Lonely Lady	Universal Pictures	Peter Sasdy (director); John Kershaw, Shawn Randall (screenplay); Pia Zadora, Lloyd Bochner, Bibi Besch, Joseph Cali, Anthony Holland, Jared Martin, Ray Liotta, Kerry Shale, Sandra Dickinson, Glory Annen Clibbery, Lou Hirsch, Ed Bishop, Shane Rimmer, Gianni Rizzo, Mickey Knox, Kenneth Nelson, Jay Benedict, Billy J. Mitchell, Kieran Canter, Carolyn De Fonseca, Edward Mannix, Colette Hiller, Ted Rusoff, David Zed, Attilio Dottesio	

== October–December ==
Opening		Title	Production company	Cast and crew	Ref.
O C T O B E R	7	Never Cry Wolf	Walt Disney Pictures / Buena Vista Distribution / Amarok Productions Ltd.	Carroll Ballard (director); Curtis Hanson, Sam Hamm, Richard Kletter (screenplay); Charles Martin Smith, Brian Dennehy, Tom Dahlgren, Zachary Ittimangnaq, Samson Jorah, Martha Ittimangnaq, Hugh Webster, Walker Stuart	
O C T O B E R	7	Never Say Never Again	Warner Bros. / Taliafilm / Producers Sales Organization	Irvin Kershner (director); Lorenzo Semple Jr. (screenplay); Sean Connery, Klaus Maria Brandauer, Max von Sydow, Barbara Carrera, Kim Basinger, Bernie Casey, Alec McCowen, Edward Fox, Rowan Atkinson, Saskia Cohen-Tanugi, Gavan O'Herlihy, Ronald Pickup, Pamela Salem, Valerie Leon, Prunella Gee, Pat Roach, Anthony Sharp	
O C T O B E R	7	Romantic Comedy	MGM/UA Entertainment Co. / Taft Entertainment	Arthur Hiller (director); Bernard Slade (screenplay); Dudley Moore, Mary Steenburgen, Frances Sternhagen, Janet Eilber, Robyn Douglass, Ron Leibman, Dick Wieand, Fran Bennett, George Tyne, Stanley Ralph Ross	
O C T O B E R	9	Tiger Town	Walt Disney Television / Buena Vista Television	Alan Shapiro (director/screenplay); Roy Scheider, Justin Henry, Ron McLarty, Sparky Anderson	
O C T O B E R	21	All the Right Moves	20th Century Fox	Michael Chapman (director); Michael Kane (screenplay); Tom Cruise, Craig T. Nelson, Lea Thompson, Charles Cioffi, Gary Graham, Paul Carafotes, Chris Penn, Leon, Sandy Faison, James A. Baffico, Mel Winkler, Terry O'Quinn	
O C T O B E R	21	The Dead Zone	Paramount Pictures / Dino De Laurentiis Company	David Cronenberg (director); Jeffrey Boam (screenplay); Christopher Walken, Brooke Adams, Tom Skerritt, Herbert Lom, Anthony Zerbe, Colleen Dewhurst, Martin Sheen, Nicholas Campbell, Simon Craig, Géza Kovács	
O C T O B E R	21	The Right Stuff	Warner Bros. / The Ladd Company	Philip Kaufman (director/screenplay); Charles Frank, Scott Glenn, Ed Harris, Lance Henriksen, Scott Paulin, Dennis Quaid, Sam Shepard, Fred Ward, Kim Stanley, Barbara Hershey, Veronica Cartwright, Pamela Reed, Jane Dornacker, Harry Shearer, Jeff Goldblum, Donald Moffat, Levon Helm, Mary Jo Deschanel, Scott Wilson, Kathy Baker, Mickey Crocker, Susan Kase, Mittie Smith, Royal Dano, David Clennon, Scott Beach, John P. Ryan, Eric Sevareid, William Russ, Robert Beer, Peggy Davis, John Dehner, Royce Grones, Brigadier General Chuck Yeager, Anthony Muñoz, David Gulpilil, Ed Sullivan, Bill Dana, Yuri Gagarin, Nikita Khrushchev, Georgi Malenkov, Nikolai Bulganin, Kliment Voroshilov, Anastas Mikoyan, Lyndon B. Johnson, John F. Kennedy, Alan Shepard, James E. Webb	
O C T O B E R	21	Rumble Fish	Universal Pictures / Zoetrope Studios	Francis Ford Coppola (director/screenplay); S.E. Hinton (screenplay); Matt Dillon, Mickey Rourke, Vincent Spano, Diane Lane, Diana Scarwid, Nicolas Cage, Dennis Hopper, Chris Penn, Larry Fishburne, William Smith, Glenn Withrow, Tom Waits, Michael Higgins, Sofia Coppola, S.E. Hinton	
O C T O B E R	21	Under Fire	Orion Pictures	Roger Spottiswoode (director); Ron Shelton, Clayton Frohman (screenplay); Nick Nolte, Gene Hackman, Joanna Cassidy, Jean-Louis Trintignant, Richard Masur, Ed Harris, René Enriquez, Hamilton Camp, Eloy Casados, Jenny Gago, Alma Martínez, Jorge Zepeda	
O C T O B E R	28	Educating Rita	Columbia Pictures / Acorn Pictures	Lewis Gilbert (director); Willy Russell (screenplay); Michael Caine, Julie Walters, Michael Williams, Dearbhla Molloy, Jeananne Crowley, Malcolm Douglas, Godfrey Quigley, Patricia Jeffares, Maeve Germaine, Maureen Lipman, Gerry Sullivan, Pat Daly, Kim Fortune, Philip Hurdwood, Hilary Reynolds, Jack Walsh, Christopher Casson, Gabrielle Reidy, Des Nealon, Marie Conmee, Oliver Maguire, Derry Power, Alan Stanford	
O C T O B E R	28	The Wicked Lady	MGM/UA / The Cannon Group	Michael Winner (director/screenplay); Leslie Arliss, Aimée Stuart, Gordon Glennon (screenplay); Faye Dunaway, Alan Bates, John Gielgud, Denholm Elliott, Hugh Millais, Prunella Scales, Oliver Tobias, Glynis Barber, Joan Hickson, Helena McCarthy, Mollie Maureen, Derek Francis, Marina Sirtis, Nicholas Gecks, John Savident, Marc Sinden, Mark Burns	
N O V E M B E R	2	National Lampoon's Movie Madness	United Artists / Metro-Goldwyn-Mayer / Matty Simmons Productions	Bob Giraldi, Henry Jaglom (directors); Tod Carroll, Gerald Sussman, Shary Flenniken, Pat Mephitis, Ellis Weiner (screenplay); Peter Riegert, Diane Lane, Candy Clark, Teresa Ganzel, Schnootie Neff, Andy Shakman, Tamar Howard, Ian Fried, Nedra Volz, Trinidad Silva, John Lawlor, Ann Dusenberry, Robert Culp, Titos Vandis, Bobby Di Cicco, Joe Spinell, Margaret Whitton, Fred Willard, Olympia Dukakis, Mary Woronov, Dick Miller, George Dickerson, Jake Steinfeld, Robby Benson, Richard Widmark, Christopher Lloyd, Barry Diamond, Julie Kavner, Elisha Cook, Henny Youngman, Bill Kirchenbauer, Harry Reems, Rockne Tarkington, Rhea Perlman, Lee Wilkof	
N O V E M B E R	4	Deal of the Century	Warner Bros.	William Friedkin (director); Paul Brickman (screenplay); Chevy Chase, Sigourney Weaver, Gregory Hines, Vince Edwards, Wallace Shawn, Richard Libertini, William Marquez, Eduardo Ricard, Richard Herd, Graham Jarvis, Randi Brooks, Ebbe Roe Smith, Ray Manzarek, Jack Angel, Charles Levin, Pepe Serna, Wilfredo Hernández, John Davey, Miguel Piñero, Maurice Marsac, Joe Ross, Jonathan Terry, Robert Cornthwaite, Jo Marie Payton-Noble, Tony Plana, John Hancock, Helen Martin, Eddie Hice, John Reilly, Louis Giambalvo, Robert Alan Browne, Bradford English, Jim Ishida, Michael Yama, Judith Baldwin, Robert David Hall, Tracey Walter, Tom Willett	
N O V E M B E R	4	Experience Preferred... But Not Essential	Goldcrest Films	Peter Duffell (director); June Roberts, Jack Rosenthal (screenplay); Elizabeth Edmonds, Sue Wallace, Geraldine Griffiths, Karen Meagher, Maggie Wilkinson, Ron Bain, Alun Lewis, Robert Blythe, Roy Heather, Peter Doran, Arwen Holm, Sion Tudor Owen, Robert Gwilym, Mostyn Evans, Paul Haley, Margo Jenkins, Jerry Brooke	
N O V E M B E R	4	From Russia with Love (re-issue)	MGM/UA Entertainment Co. / Eon Productions	Terence Young (director); Richard Maibaum (screenplay); Sean Connery, Pedro Armendáriz, Lotte Lenya, Robert Shaw, Bernard Lee, Daniela Bianchi, Eunice Gayson, Walter Gotell, Francis de Wolff, George Pastell, Nadja Regin, Lois Maxwell, Aliza Gur, Martin Beswick, Vladek Sheybal, Leila	
N O V E M B E R	4	Moonraker (re-issue)	MGM/UA Entertainment Co. / Eon Productions	Lewis Gilbert (director); Christopher Wood (screenplay); Roger Moore, Lois Chiles, Michael Lonsdale, Richard Kiel, Corinne Cléry, Bernard Lee, Geoffrey Keen, Desmond Llewelyn, Lois Maxwell, Toshiro Suga, Emily Bolton, Blanche Ravalec, Irka Bochenko, Michael Marshall, Leila Shenna, Anne Lonnberg, Jean-Pierre Castaldi, Walter Gotell, Alfie Bass, Claude Carliez	
N O V E M B E R	4	The Osterman Weekend	20th Century Fox / Davis-Panzer Productions / Osterman Weekend Associates	Sam Peckinpah (director); Alan Sharp (screenplay); Rutger Hauer, John Hurt, Craig T. Nelson, Dennis Hopper, Burt Lancaster, Chris Sarandon, Meg Foster, Helen Shaver, Cassie Yates, Sandy McPeak, Merete Van Kamp, Christopher Starr	
N O V E M B E R	4	Running Brave	Buena Vista Distribution / Englander Productions	Donald Shebib (director); Henry Bean, Shirl Hendryx (screenplay); Robby Benson, Pat Hingle, Claudia Cron, Jeff McCracken, Graham Greene, Wendell Smith	
N O V E M B E R	4	Testament	Paramount Pictures	Lynne Littman (director); John Sacret Young (screenplay); Jane Alexander, William Devane, Leon Ames, Lukas Haas, Roxana Zal, Kevin Costner, Rebecca De Mornay	
N O V E M B E R	10	Star 80	Warner Bros. / The Ladd Company	Bob Fosse (director/screenplay); Mariel Hemingway, Eric Roberts, Cliff Robertson, Carroll Baker, Roger Rees, David Clennon, Stuart Damon, Josh Mostel, Jordan Christopher, Ernest Thompson, Tina Willson, James Luisi, Sidney Miller, Deborah Geffner, Lisa Gordon, Shelly Ingram, Neva Patterson, Terence Kelly, Stanley Kamel, Cis Rundle, Kathryn Witt, Gwen Welles, Robert Picardo, Keith Hefner, Budd Friedman, Keenen Ivory Wayans	
N O V E M B E R	18	Amityville 3-D	Orion Pictures	Richard Fleischer (director); David Ambrose (screenplay); Tony Roberts, Tess Harper, Robert Joy, Candy Clark, Lori Loughlin, Meg Ryan, Neill Barry, Josefina Echánove	
N O V E M B E R	18	The Being	Best Film & Video Corp. / New World Pictures / Aquarius Films / Crest Films / Cybelle Productions	Jackie Kong (director/screenplay); Martin Landau, José Ferrer, Dorothy Malone, Ruth Buzzi, Marianne Gordon Rogers, Bill Osco	
N O V E M B E R	18	A Christmas Story	MGM/UA Entertainment Co.	Bob Clark (director/screenplay); Jean Shepherd, Leigh Brown (screenplay); Peter Billingsley, Jean Shepherd, Melinda Dillon, Darren McGavin, Ian Petrella, Scott Schwartz, R. D. Robb, Zack Ward, Yano Anaya, Tedde Moore, Jeff Gillen, Leslie Carlson	
N O V E M B E R	18	Nate and Hayes	Paramount Pictures / Phillips-Whitehouse Productions	Ferdinand Fairfax (director); John Hughes, David Odell (screenplay); Tommy Lee Jones, Michael O'Keefe, Max Phipps, Jenny Seagrove, Grant Tilly, Peter Rowley, Prince Tui Teka	
N O V E M B E R	18	A Night in Heaven	20th Century Fox	John G. Avildsen (director); Joan Tewkesbury (screenplay); Christopher Atkins, Lesley Ann Warren, Robert Logan, Deney Terrio, Deborah Rush, Sandra Beall, Alix Elias, Carrie Snodgress, Andy García	
N O V E M B E R	18	Sleepaway Camp	United Film Distribution Company / American Eagle Films	Robert Hiltzik (director/screenplay); Felissa Rose, Jonathan Tiersten, Karen Fields, Christopher Collet, Mike Kellin, Katherine Kamhi, Desiree Gould, Robert Earl Jones, Paul DeAngelo, Susan Glaze, Amy Baio, Tom Van Dell, Loris Sallahain, John E. Dunn, Ethan Larosa, Willy Kuskin, Owen Hughes, Frank Trent Saladino, Rick Edrich, Fred Greene, Allen Breton, Michael C. Mahon, Dan Tursi, James Paradise, Paul Poland, Alyson Mord, Carol Robinson	
N O V E M B E R	20	The Day After	ABC Motion Pictures / ABC Circle Films	Nicholas Meyer (director); Edward Hume (screenplay); Jason Robards, JoBeth Williams, Steve Guttenberg, John Cullum, John Lithgow, Amy Madigan, Georgann Johnson, Lori Lethin, Calvin Jung, Rosanna Huffman, George Petrie, William Allen Young, Jeff East, Dennis Lipscomb, Stephen Furst, Arliss Howard, Harry Bugin, Kyle Aletter, Doug Scott, Ellen Anthony, Lin McCarthy, Jonathan Estrin, Clayton Day, Antonie Becker, Stan Wilson	
N O V E M B E R	24	Of Unknown Origin	Warner Bros. / Canadian Film Development Corporation / Famous Players Limited / Les Productions Mutuelles	George P. Cosmatos (director); Brian Taggert (screenplay); Peter Weller, Jennifer Dale, Lawrence Dane, Kenneth Welsh, Louis Del Grande, Aimée Castle, Shannon Tweed, Kevin Knight, Maury Chaykin	
N O V E M B E R	25	The Big Score		Fred Williamson (director); Gail Morgan Hickman (screenplay); Fred Williamson, Nancy Wilson, John Saxon, Richard Roundtree, Ed Lauter, Michael Dante, D'Urville Martin, Bruce Glover, Joe Spinell, Frank Pesce, Tony King, Chelcie Ross, Ron Dean, Jack Wallace, Greg Noonan, Joe Krowka	
N O V E M B E R	25	The Smurfs and the Magic Flute	SEPP, Brussels / Éditions Dupuis / Belvision Studios	José Dutillieu (director); Peyo (screenplay)	
N O V E M B E R	28	The Gambler: The Adventure Continues	CBS / Sony Pictures Television / Lion Share	Dick Lowry (director); Jim Byrnes (screenplay); Kenny Rogers, Bruce Boxleitner, Linda Evans, Johnny Crawford, Charlie Fields, David Hedison, Robert Hoy, Brion James, Paul Koslo, Cameron Mitchell, Mitchell Ryan, Gregory Sierra, Ken Swofford, Harold Gould, Macon McCalman, Lee Paul, Ann Gillespie, Marianne Gordon, Patrick Thomas O'Brien, John Putch, Roy Jenson, Whitney Rydbeck, Bart the Bear, Gary Cox, Bill Hart, Kelly Junkerman, Henry 'Hank' Kendrick, Joe Massengale, Cliff McLaughlin, Gene McLaughlin, Earl Smith, Bob Terhune, Henry Wills, Cathy Worthington, Randal Patrick	
D E C E M B E R	2	Sahara	Metro-Goldwyn-Mayer / Golan-Globus / Cannon Group / United Artists	Andrew McLaglen (director); James R. Silke, Menahem Golan (screenplay); Brooke Shields, Lambert Wilson, Horst Buchholz, John Rhys-Davies, Ronald Lacey, John Mills	
D E C E M B E R	6	The Dresser	Columbia Pictures	Peter Yates (director); Ronald Harwood (screenplay); Albert Finney, Tom Courtenay, Edward Fox, Zena Walker, Eileen Atkins, Michael Gough, Cathryn Harrison, Betty Marsden, Sheila Reid, Lockwood West, Donald Eccles, Llewellyn Rees, Guy Manning, Anne Mannion, Kevin Stoney, Ann Way, John Sharp, Kathy Staff, Roger Avon	
D E C E M B E R	9	Christine	Columbia Pictures / Delphi Premier Productions / Polar Film	John Carpenter (director); Bill Phillips (screenplay); Keith Gordon, John Stockwell, Alexandra Paul, Robert Prosky, Harry Dean Stanton, Christine Belford, Robert Darnell, Roberts Blossom, Kelly Preston, William Ostrander, Steven Tash, Stuart Charno, Malcolm Danare, David Spielberg	
D E C E M B E R	9	Scarface	Universal Pictures	Brian De Palma (director); Oliver Stone (screenplay); Al Pacino, Steven Bauer, Michelle Pfeiffer, Mary Elizabeth Mastrantonio, Robert Loggia, Miriam Colon, F. Murray Abraham, Paul Shenar, Harris Yulin, Angel Salazar, Arnaldo Santana, Pepe Serna, Michael P. Moran, Al Israel, Dennis Holahan, Mark Margolis, Michael Alldredge, Ted Beniades, Geno Silva, Richard Belzer, Lana Clarkson, Charles Durning, Dennis Franz, Albert Carrier	
D E C E M B E R	9	Sudden Impact	Warner Bros.	Clint Eastwood (director); Joseph Stinson (screenplay); Clint Eastwood, Sondra Locke, Pat Hingle, Bradford Dillman, Paul Drake, Albert Popwell, Audrie J. Neenan, Jack Thibeau, Michael Currie, Michael V. Gazzo, Mark Keyloun, Kevyn Major Howard, Bette Ford, Nancy Parsons	
D E C E M B E R	9	Terms of Endearment	Paramount Pictures	James L. Brooks (director/screenplay); Shirley MacLaine, Debra Winger, Jack Nicholson, Danny DeVito, Jeff Daniels, John Lithgow, Huckleberry Fox, Albert Brooks, Lisa Hart Carroll, Troy Bishop, Shane Sherwin, Megan Morris, Tara Yeakey, Kate Charleson	
D E C E M B E R	9	Yentl	MGM/UA Entertainment Company / United Artists / Barwood Films / Ladbroke Entertainment	Barbra Streisand (director/screenplay); Jack Rosenthal (screenplay); Barbra Streisand, Mandy Patinkin, Amy Irving, Nehemiah Persoff, Steven Hill, Allan Corduner, Miriam Margolyes, Doreen Mantle	
D E C E M B E R	14	Silkwood	20th Century Fox / ABC Motion Pictures	Mike Nichols (director); Nora Ephron, Alice Arlen (screenplay); Meryl Streep, Kurt Russell, Cher, Craig T. Nelson, Fred Ward, Diana Scarwid, Ron Silver, Josef Sommer, Charles Hallahan, Tess Harper, Sudie Bond, Henderson Forsythe, Bruce McGill, David Strathairn, M. Emmet Walsh, Ray Baker, Will Patton, E. Katherine Kerr, J.C. Quinn, Kent Broadhurst, Richard Hamilton, Les Lannom, Graham Jarvis, James Rebhorn, Bill Cobbs, Gary Grubbs, Anthony Heald, Jim Beaver	
D E C E M B E R	16	D.C. Cab	Universal Pictures / The Guber-Peters Company / RKO Pictures	Joel Schumacher (director/screenplay); Adam Baldwin, Charlie Barnett, Irene Cara, Anne De Salvo, Max Gail, Mr. T, José Pérez, Paul Rodriguez, Gary Busey, Gloria Gifford, Marsha Warfield, Bill Maher, DeWayne Jessie, Whitman Mayo, Peter Barbarian, David Barbarian, Diana Bellamy, John Diehl, Newton D. Arnold, Dennis Stewart, Jim Moody, Bob Zmuda, Jill Schoelen, Timothy Carey	
D E C E M B E R	16	Reuben, Reuben	20th Century Fox / Saltair Productions / TAFT Entertainment Pictures	Robert Ellis Miller (director); Julius J. Epstein (screenplay); Tom Conti, Kelly McGillis, Roberts Blossom, Cynthia Harris, Joel Fabiani, Lois Smith, Rex Robbins, Kara Wilson, Robert Nichols, Ed Grady, Scott Coffey, E. Katherine Kerr, Jack Davidson, Damon Douglas, Dan Doby	
D E C E M B E R	16	The Keep	Paramount Pictures	Michael Mann (director/screenplay); Scott Glenn, Alberta Watson, Jürgen Prochnow, Robert Prosky, Gabriel Byrne, Ian McKellen, W. Morgan Sheppard, Royston Tickner, Michael Carter, Rosalie Crutchley, Wolf Kahler, Bruce Payne	
D E C E M B E R	16	The Rescuers (re-issue)	Walt Disney Productions / Buena Vista Pictures Distribution	Wolfgang Reitherman, John Lounsbery, Art Stevens (directors); Larry Clemmons, Vance Gerry, Ken Anderson, Frank Thomas, Burny Mattinson, Fred Lucky, Dick Sebast, David Michener, Ted Berman (screenplay); Bob Newhart, Eva Gabor, Geraldine Page, Joe Flynn, Jim Jordan, John McIntire, Jeanette Nolan, Pat Buttram, Bernard Fox, James MacDonald, George Lindsey, Larry Clemmons, Dub Taylor, John Fiedler, Shelby Flint, Michelle Stacy, Bill McMillan	
D E C E M B E R	16	The Man Who Loved Women	Columbia Pictures	Blake Edwards (director/screenplay); Milton Wexler, Geoffrey Edwards (screenplay); Burt Reynolds, Julie Andrews, Kim Basinger, Marilu Henner, Cynthia Sikes, Jennifer Edwards, Sela Ward, Ellen Bauer, Denise Crosby, Tracy Vaccaro, Barry Corbin, Roger Rose	
D E C E M B E R	16	To Be or Not to Be	20th Century Fox / Brooksfilms	Alan Johnson (director); Ronny Graham, Thomas Meehan (screenplay); Mel Brooks, Anne Bancroft, Tim Matheson, Charles Durning, José Ferrer, George Gaynes, Christopher Lloyd, George Wyner, Lewis J. Stadlen, Jack Riley, Ronny Graham, Estelle Reiner, Earl Boen, Ivor Barry, Max Brooks, Larry Rosenberg, Milt Jamin, Wolf Muser, Henry Brandon, Tucker Smith, Curt Lowens, Paddi Edwards, Terence Marsh, Paul Ratliff, Scott Beach, William Glover, James Haake, Marley Sims	
D E C E M B E R	16	Two of a Kind	20th Century Fox	John Herzfeld (director/screenplay); John Travolta, Olivia Newton-John, Charles Durning, Oliver Reed, Beatrice Straight, Scatman Crothers, Richard Bright, Toni Kalem, James Stephens, Ernie Hudson, Jack Kehoe, Robert Costanzo, Castulo Guerra, Sheila Frazier, Kathy Bates, Gene Hackman, Charles Hallahan, Tom Morga, Tom Willett	
D E C E M B E R	16	Uncommon Valor	Paramount Pictures	Ted Kotcheff (director); Joe Gayton (screenplay); Gene Hackman, Fred Ward, Reb Brown, Randall "Tex" Cobb, Patrick Swayze, Harold Sylvester, Tim Thomerson, Robert Stack, Michael Dudikoff, Kwan Hi Lim, Lau Nga Lai, Gail Strickland, Jane Kaczmarek, Gloria Stroock, Todd Allen	
D E C E M B E R	29	Seeding of a Ghost	Shaw Brothers Studio	Chuan Yang (director); Lam Yee Hung (screenplay); Phillip Ko, Maria Yuen, Norman Chui	
D E C E M B E R	30	The Makioka Sisters	Toho	Kon Ichikawa (director/screenplay); Shinya Hidaka, Junichiro Tanizaki (screenplay)	

== See also ==
- List of 1983 box office number-one films in the United States
- 1983 in the United States
