= Laughing Room Only =

2003 Broadway musical

Playbill cover from the 2003 Broadway production

Jackie Mason's Laughing Room Only is a 2003 Broadway musical with a book by Dennis Blair and Digby Wolfe and music and lyrics by Doug Katsaros. It began previews at the Brooks Atkinson Theatre on October 23, 2003, opened on November 19, 2003, and closed on November 30, 2003, totaling 14 performances. The show's story features the titular Jackie Mason as himself as he tries to put on a 10 million dollar musical on a budget of $19.99.

Other cast members were Ruth Gottschall, Cheryl Stern, Darrin Baker, Robert Creighton, and Barry Finkel. The show was directed by Robert Johanson.

== Songs ==
=== Act l ===
- Million Dollar Musical
- French Chanteuse
- This Jew Can Sing
- Frieda From Fresno
- Only in Manhattan
- Starbucks

=== Act ll ===
- Comedy Ambulance
- Jackie's Signature Song
- I Need a Man
- Perfect
- Jew Gentile Tap-Off
- Tea Time
- Musical Chairs
- Finale

== Reception ==
Variety gave the show a mixed review, praising Mason's comedic talent while being less impressed with some of his reused material and the show's music.
