= 4 Out of 5 Doctors =

American power pop band

- Origin: USA
- Genres: Rock; Power pop
- Years active: 1979–1984
- Label: CBS Records
- Past members: Cal Everett; Jeff Severson; George Pittaway; Tom Ballew

4 Out of 5 Doctors was a Washington D.C.–based power pop band. They released an eponymous LP in 1980 produced by Alan Winstanley, and a second LP in 1982 ("Second Opinion", produced by Jeff Glixman, producer for Black Sabbath in the 1980s). The Doctors toured the United States extensively. Their eclectic songs and astounding musicianship created a cult following and has been cited as an influence by many musicians. The Doctors were involved in several early 1980s films. In the summer of 2008, after a 17-year hiatus, 4 Out of 5 Doctors reunited for a sold-out show at the Jammin Java club in Vienna, Virginia, and performed at the 2008 Wammie Awards at the State Theatre in Falls Church, Virginia, on February 15, 2009.

== Members ==
- Cal Everett – lead vocals, bass
- George Pittaway – vocals, guitar
- Jeff Severson – vocals, guitars, keyboard
- Tom Ballew – vocals, drums

According to band member Jeff Severson, the Doctors toured with Hall & Oates, Ritchie Blackmore, and Pat Travers, and opened for The Clash, The Cars, Cyndi Lauper, Steppenwolf, Jim Carroll, and others. They also opened a few shows on Van Halen's 1981 Fair Warning tour.

The band scored an 82 on Dick Clark's American Bandstand segment titled Rate-a-Record.

== Film ==
4 Out of 5 Doctors performed several of their songs ("Waiting for Roxanne", "Mr Cool Shoes", "Modern Man", "Waiting for a Change", and "Dawn Patrol") in the 1983 film The House on Sorority Row, and two songs ("Not from Her World" and "Baby Baby goes Bye Bye") in the 1980 film The Boogeyman.

== Discography ==
=== 4 Out of 5 Doctors ===
- Year: 1980
- Label: Nemperor/CBS Records
- Recorded at: Coconuts Recording Company, Miami FL

==== SIDE 1 ====
1. Modern Man (Jeff Severson)
2. Jeff, Jeff (Jeff Severson)
3. Waiting for a Change (Cal Everett)
4. Elizabeth (Cal Everett)
5. Opus 10 (George Pittaway)
6. I Want Her (Cal Everett)

==== SIDE 2 ====
1. New Wave Girls (George Pittaway)
2. Mr. Cool Shoes (Cal Everett)
3. Danger Man (Jeff Severson)
4. Mushroom Boy (Jeff Severson)
5. Not from Her World (Cal Everett)

Putting this band in the studio with established producer Alan Winstanley (who, with his "other half", Clive Langer, produced some widely regarded as great albums of the '80s including all of Madness' albums) was a good idea. The Doctors' had three professional songwriters in their ranks (bassist/vocalist Cal Everett and guitarists Jeff Severson and George Pittaway), and, as a whole, the Doctors (and Winstanley) crafted an album of songs that were varied in style but were POP to the core. Although the album itself was geared toward a younger crowd, the Doctors' arrangements were more mature than "clever", creating an album that was more "timeless" than "of its time." Of course, there were attempts to turn the Doctors into a new wave band (just listen to the quirky spy-themed "Danger Man" for proof) but their keen sense of melody saved the day. In fact, the Doctors were classic songwriters, putting as much into the verses, bridges, and middle eights as they did with their choruses. Lyrically, they were clever, not relying too much on the normal new wave themes of the time (though both "Modern Man" and the aforementioned "Danger Man" do allude to their times). The centerpiece of the album is two rockin' songs linked together that close the first side of the album, "Opus 10" and "I Want Her," both rather basic in formula but powerful in their delivery and placement on the album. A touchingly endearing album with more heart than you'd expect. ~ Stephen Schnee, AllMusic

=== Second Opinion ===
- Year: 1982
- Label: Nemperor/CBS Records
- Recorded: Atlanta, Georgia
- Producer: Jeff Glixman

==== SIDE 1 ====
1. Good Pretender (George Pittaway)
2. Dawn Patrol (Cal Everett, George Pittaway)
3. Anna with Antennae (Jeff Severson)
4. Breaking Rocks (Cal Everett)
5. Never Say Die (Cal Everett)

==== SIDE 2 ====
1. Waiting for Roxanne (Jeff Severson)
2. Lonely Ones (Cal Everett)
3. Heart on a Chain (Jeff Severson)
4. Call Me at Home (Cal Everett)
5. Young World (Cal Everett)

Though their self-titled debut album met with little or no national success, the Doctors entered the studio to record their second album, this time with hitmaking producer Jeff Glixman, who had handled many commercial rock artists in recent years, including Kansas. Strange as it may seem, the Doctors' '80s outlook and Glixman's hard rock history created an album as exciting as the Doctors' debut, though less varied. Using the first album's "I Want Her" as a jumping-off point, the Doctors rock hard on 2nd Opinion without losing any of their charm or melodicism. Bassist/vocalist Cal Everett sounds more confident vocally and his songs have even more hooks than before. "Breaking Rocks" rocks hard with a vocal that will melt even the most hardened criminal. "The Lonely Ones" is equally wonderful. "Dawn Patrol" is the pop/rocker that Night Ranger wanted to write but was too pompous to do so. Guitarist Jeff Severson's "Waiting for Roxanne" is an absolute classic right out of the box and should have been the big radio hit that the Doctors were waiting for. "Heart on a Chain" is another classic that should not have had to wait for a radio station to play it. Only guitarist George Pittaway's "Good Pretender" fails to live up to the rest of the album, though it is certainly a good track. With another great album under their belts, the Doctors did what all good bands do at this point in their career...they broke up. Disappointed listeners might not forgive them for it. ~ Stephen Schnee, AllMusic
