= WIOU (TV series) =

American television drama series

- Genre: Drama
- Created by: John Eisendrath; Kathryn Pratt
- Written by: John Eisendrath; Kathryn Pratt
- Directed by: Donna Deitch; Jan Eliasberg; Arthur Allan Seidelman
- Starring: John Shea; Helen Shaver; Harris Yulin; Phil Morris; Joe Grifasi; Wallace Langham; Jayne Brook; Robin Gammell; Dick Van Patten; Kate McNeil; Mariette Hartley
- Composer: Gary Chang
- Country of origin: United States
- Original language: English
- No. of seasons: 1
- No. of episodes: 14 (1 unaired)

Production
- Executive producer: Scott Brazil
- Producer: Michelle Ashford
- Running time: 60 minutes
- Production companies: GTG Entertainment; Little Max Productions; Orion Television

Original release
- Network: CBS
- Release: October 24, 1990 – March 20, 1991

WIOU is an American drama television series, which aired on CBS from October 24, 1990, until March 20, 1991. The show is set in the news department of a fictional television station whose actual callsign is WNDY, but which is nicknamed WIOU by its staff because of the station's perennial financial struggles.

According to television researchers Tim Brooks and Earle Marsh, 14 episodes were produced but only 13 aired.

== Summary ==
The show stars John Shea as news director Hank Zaret. The cast also includes Mariette Hartley as executive producer Liz McVay; Harris Yulin and Helen Shaver, as news anchors Neal Frazier and Kelby Robinson; Phil Morris, as aggressive reporter Eddie Bock; Jayne Brook, as reporter Ann Hudson; Kate McNeil, as reporter Taylor Young; Dick Van Patten, as aging weatherman Floyd Graham; and Wallace Langham, as news intern Willis Teitelbaum.

== Cast ==
- John Shea as Hank Zaret
- Helen Shaver as Kelby Robinson
- Harris Yulin as Neal Frazier
- Dick Van Patten as Floyd Graham
- Mariette Hartley as Liz McVay
- Kate McNeil as Taylor Young
- Phil Morris as Eddie Brock
- Wallace Langham as Willis Teitelbaum
- Jayne Brook as Ann Hudson
- Joe Grifasi as Tony Pro
- Robin Gammell as Kevin Doherty

== Episodes ==
No.	Title	Directed by	Written by	Original release date	Prod. code
1	"Pilot"	Claudia Weill	Story by : John Eisendrath & Kathryn Pratt & Scott Brazil; Teleplay by : John Eisendrath & Kathryn Pratt	October 24, 1990	748-0000
2	"Appearances"	Mark Tinker	John Eisendrath	October 31, 1990	748-0101
3	"The Inquisition"	Arthur Seidelman	Michael Cassutt	November 7, 1990	748-0102
4	"Do the Wrong Thing"	Mark Tinker	Tammy Ader	November 14, 1990	748-0103
5	"One Point, No Light"	Scott Brazil	Michelle Ashford	December 5, 1990	748-0104
6	"They Shoot Sources, Don't They?"	Ben Bolt	Gardner Stern	December 12, 1990	748-0105
7	"Diamond Dogs"	Jan Eliasberg	Matt Dearborn & Tammy Ader & John Eisendrath	December 19, 1990	748-0106
8	"Mother Nature's Son"	Donna Deitch	Story by : Katie Crusoe & Michael Cassutt; Teleplay by : Michael Cassutt	December 26, 1990	748-0107
9	"Ode to Sizzling Sal"	David Carson	Kathryn Ford	January 2, 1991	748-0108
10	"Labored Relations"	Bethany Rooney Hillshafer	Joe Viola	January 9, 1991	748-0109
11	"Bleeds, It Leads" "Without Prejudice"	Ben Bolt	Michelle Ashford	March 4, 1991	748-0110
12	"Pair o' Guys Lost"	Unknown	Gardner Stern	March 13, 1991	TBA
13	"Three Women and a Baby"	Unknown	Kathryn Pratt	March 20, 1991	TBA
14	"One Flew Over the Anchor Desk"	Fred Gerber	Tammy Ader & Gary Goldstein & John Eisendrath	Unaired	748-0113
