= Bodies of Evidence (TV series) =

- Genre: Police drama
- Created by: David Jacobs; James L. Conway
- Starring: Lee Horsley; George Clooney; Kate McNeil; Al Fann
- Theme music composer: Christopher Klatman
- Country of origin: United States
- Original language: English
- No. of seasons: 2
- No. of episodes: 16

Production
- Executive producer: David Jacobs
- Production companies: Roundelay Productions; James L. Conway Productions; Lorimar Television

Original release
- Network: CBS
- Release: June 18, 1992 – May 28, 1993

Bodies of Evidence is an American television police drama series that aired on CBS between June 1992 and May 1993. The show starred Lee Horsley, and George Clooney in his last leading television role before ER. In its first season, the series was a relatively well-rated summer series, and was brought back for an eight-episode second season in spring 1993.

== Plot ==
A team of homicide detectives, led by the veteran head of the department Lt. Ben Carroll (Lee Horsley), work cases in an unnamed big city. Carroll's team is made up of Det. Ryan Walker (George Clooney), a talented detective with a propensity to get too emotionally invested in his cases; Det. Nora Houghton, a rookie detective unsure of her skills; and Houghton's partner, Det. Will Stratton, a jaded veteran detective close to retirement. They are assisted in their cases by the department's forensics specialist, Lemar Samuels (Leslie Jordan). The series also attempts to highlight how the homicide detectives' work life impacts their personal lives.

== Cast ==
- Lee Horsley as Lieutenant Ben Carroll
- George Clooney as Det. Ryan Walker
- Kate McNeil as Det. Nora Houghton
- Al Fann as Det. Will Stratton
- Leslie Jordan as Lemar Samuels
- Francis X. McCarthy as Sgt. Jimmy Houghton
- Lorraine Toussaint as Dr. Mary Rocket (season 1)
- Jennifer Hetrick as Bonnie Carroll
- Alan Fudge as Chief Frank Leland
- Kimberly Scott as Maggie Holland (season 2)

== Episodes ==
=== Series overview ===
Season	Episodes	Originally released	
Season	Episodes	First released	Last released
1	8	June 18, 1992	August 27, 1992
2	8	March 30, 1993	May 28, 1993

=== Season 1 (1992) ===
No. overall	No. in season	Title	Directed by	Written by	Original release date	Prod. code
1	1	"Afternoon Delights"	James L. Conway	David Jacobs & James L. Conway	June 18, 1992	447501
2	2	"Nightmoves"	Bruce Seth Green	James L. Conway & Joel J. Feigenbaum	June 25, 1992	447502
3	3	"The Cold Light of Day"	Randall Zisk	James L. Conway & Joel J. Feigenbaum	July 2, 1992	447503
4	4	"Echoes in the Dark"	Bruce Seth Green	Joel J. Feigenbaum	July 9, 1992	447504
5	5	"Street Justice"	Harry Harris	Thomas C. Chapman	July 23, 1992	446705
6	6	"Time Served"	Robert Becker	Nancy Miller	July 30, 1992	447506
7	7	"Nearest and Dearest"	Harry Harris	Jerry Ludwig	August 13, 1992	447507
8	8	"The Edge"	James L. Conway	James L. Conway & Joel J. Feigenbaum	August 27, 1992	447508

=== Season 2 (1993) ===
No. overall	No. in season	Title	Directed by	Written by	Original release date	Prod. code
9	1	"Whispers of the Dead"	Craig Denault	Joel J. Feigenbaum	March 30, 1993	447511
Note: Special Tuesday night preview airing.
10	2	"Blindside"	Burt Brinckerhoff	James L. Conway	April 2, 1993	447512
11	3	"Trial by Fire"	Robert Becker	Robert Brennan	April 9, 1993	447513
12	4	"Eleven Grains of Sand"	Lee Sheldon	Joel J. Feigenbaum	April 16, 1993	447514
13	5	"Shadows"	Burt Brinckerhoff	Michael Fisher	April 23, 1993	447515
14	6	"The Formula"	Jeff Kibbee	Gerald Sanford	April 30, 1993	447516
15	7	"Endangered Species"	Alan J. Levi	Peter Dunne	May 7, 1993	447517
16	8	"Flesh and Blood"	Neal Ahern	Story by : Rogers Turrentine; Teleplay by : Thomas C. Chapman	May 28, 1993	447518

=== Broadcast history ===
- Thursdays 10:00–11:00 p.m. (June – August 1992)
- Fridays 10:00–11:00 p.m. (March – May 1993)

== Reception ==
The critical reception to Bodies of Evidence was mixed to mostly negative. Tony Scott of Variety described the series' pilot as having "sharp production values, little humorous relief, and generally pro performances", though with "several off-putting touches". But Entertainment Weekly's Ken Tucker gave the show a "D" grade, calling it "Law & Order Lite — a show that comes on all hard-boiled and complicated but reworks plots that seem left over from Mannix." David Hiltbrand of People magazine gave Bodies of Evidence a "C" grade, stating, "In the regular season, I probably wouldn't give this predictable, overwritten show a second look. This being the summer session, we grade on a curve." And Los Angeles Times' Chris Willman panned the show as "tired and sub-formulaic".
