= Nobody Puts Baby in a Corner =

- Veronica Mars episode
- Episode no.: Season 2 Episode 7
- Directed by: Nick Marck
- Written by: Diane Ruggiero
- Production code: 2T7207
- Original air date: November 16, 2005

Guest appearances
- Charisma Carpenter as Kendall Casablancas; Steve Guttenberg as Woody Goodman; Michael Muhney as Don Lamb; Krysten Ritter as Gia Goodman; Rick Peters as Dr. Tom Griffith; Geoff Pierson as Stewart Manning; Kari Coleman as Mrs. Deborah Philipina Hauser; Kate McNeil as Betina Casablancas; Lisa Long as Jessica Fuller; Katie Mitchell as Rose Manning; Michael Kostroff as Samuel Nelson Pope

Episode chronology
← Previous "Rat Saw God"	Next → "Ahoy, Mateys!"
- Veronica Mars season 2

"Nobody Puts Baby in a Corner" is the seventh episode of the second season of the American mystery television series Veronica Mars, and the twenty-ninth episode overall. Written by Diane Ruggiero and directed by Nick Marck, the episode premiered on UPN on November 16, 2005.

The series depicts the adventures of Veronica Mars (Kristen Bell) as she deals with life as a high school student while moonlighting as a private detective. In this episode, Duncan (Teddy Dunn) calls on Veronica to help investigate a subject of child abuse mentioned in his ex-girlfriend, Meg's (Alona Tal) journal. Meanwhile, the Casablancas family splits up Dick Sr.'s (David Starzyk) assets.

== Synopsis ==
Veronica and Duncan are making out in Duncan's suite when Logan (Jason Dohring), who is now living there, walks in the door. Kendall (Charisma Carpenter) shows up, and Logan invites her into the hotel room, making Duncan and Veronica uncomfortable. In a Future Business Leaders of America meeting, Cassidy (Kyle Gallner) comes out on top of the hypothetical business contest. Keith talks to new mayor Woody Goodman (Steve Guttenberg), who describes his plan to incorporate Neptune as a city. Woody offers to make Keith police chief if that happens. Logan meets Veronica in the girls' bathroom and asks her to investigate the man claiming to be the "witness" to the murder of Felix Toombs, and she agrees. Duncan pulls Veronica aside and tells her he was looking through Meg's files and has found she was emailing with Child Protective Services about a child who was being abused. Meg never says the name of the child in her emails, but describes the child as between 7–10 years old. Duncan explains that Meg babysat for a lot of families, and Veronica and Duncan decide to break into Meg's house for more evidence.

The Casablancas talk to a lawyer, who tells them the house and cars are paid off. However, Kendall has no assets separate from Dick Casablancas Sr, so all her accounts are frozen. Dick (Ryan Hansen) and Beaver each have a trust fund, but they are restricted from accessing the money until they turn 21. One of Meg's clients was the Goodman family, so Veronica arranges to go over to Gia's house for a sleepover. Veronica gets a babysitting job with one of the families who Meg babysat for, who appear very uptight and have Edwin's night scheduled down to the minute. At the babysitting job, Edwin's parents say that they almost let Meg go because of Duncan. Logan appears at the house where Veronica is babysitting. She presents information on Logan's accuser, but Logan says the man who contacted the police is not the same man he saw on the bridge. Edwin's parents come home early, and Logan has to leave. The parents thank Veronica, and while walking her out the father invites Veronica to his boat to smoke marijuana and then hands her a drawing Edwin made of her, showing her head cut off of her body.

Dick and Beaver's biological mother appears at their house. She decides to sign over their trust fund money instead of allowing Dick and Beaver to move in with her. Veronica gets another babysitting job with one of Meg's clients, this one a high-pressure teacher. However, her son is bratty and high-maintenance. In order to get information on Logan's supposed witness, a plastic surgeon named Dr. Griffith (Rick Peters), Veronica makes an appointment with him. He seems honest at first, but he lies to Veronica about having to leave for a surgery. Veronica trails him to a cigar shop. When Veronica arrives at Gia's house for the sleepover she notices that everything is labeled obsessively. Gia then "surprises" Veronica with a girls' night sleepover. Logan ends his friends-with-benefits relationship with Kendall after she pressures him for money. Kendall responds by unsuccessfully trying to seduce Duncan. During the sleepover, Veronica meets Gia's little brother, Rodney, who becomes extremely anxious after spilling a cup of water. Veronica overhears Woody telling Rodney that he'll have to tell Mrs. Goodman about the spilled water. Later Veronica sneaks away from the party and sees Woody and Mrs. Goodman speaking to Rodney, before Mrs. Goodman leads Rodney to an unknown room. Dick and Beaver, drunk, crash Gia's sleepover.

Veronica learns from Keith (Enrico Colantoni) that the cigar shop she went into is notorious for drug dealing. Logan tells Veronica that Kendall went into Duncan's room for a little while. Veronica and Duncan break into Meg's house using a hidden key Duncan knows about from Meg. They find the evidence they were looking for in Meg's air vent. Duncan steals a letter when Veronica isn't looking. Veronica figures out that Meg was actually reporting the child abuse of her youngest sister. While searching for additional evidence Veronica finds Grace Manning locked in a closet. However, Meg's dad (Geoff Pierson) suddenly arrives with a baseball bat and calls the Sheriff. Sheriff Lamb (Michael Muhney) arrives and while placing Veronica and Duncan in handcuffs Veronica quietly begs him to look in the closet. After putting Veronica and Duncan inside the patrol car Sheriff Lamb goes back inside and finds the secret room. Mr. Manning insists he is the victim, but Sheriff Lamb tells him he's heard all the excuses before. Sheriff Lamb drives away from the Manning house with Veronica and Duncan, but soon lets them go before returning to the Manning house where he waits menacingly outside.

== Cultural references ==
Many cultural references are made in the episode. They include:

- At the beginning of the episode, Veronica and Duncan are watching The Big Lebowski.
- Mr. Pope references "What a Diff'rence a Day Made".
- Veronica mentions both "Twist and Shout" and a famous scene from Ferris Bueller's Day Off.
- One of the teachers quotes the song "The Gambler".
- In an email to Wallace, Veronica quotes a famous Juliet monologue.
- In a voiceover, Veronica compares her letters to Wallace to Doogie Howser's journal.
- Dick and Beaver's biological mother quotes a lyric from "You've Got a Friend".
- Gia references "I'm So Excited".
- Veronica says that her "Spidey sense is tingling."
- Logan quotes part of the iconic line, "Frankly, my dear, I don't give a damn", spoken by Rhett Butler in Gone With the Wind.
- Madison Sinclair says at the party that Pretty Woman is her favorite movie.
- Dick and Beaver expect there to be Spin the bottle at the party.
- Veronica jokingly mentions Winnie-the-Pooh and Goodnight Moon.

== Arc significance ==
- The newly discovered witness to Felix's murder is Dr. Tom Griffith, a plastic surgeon. Logan asks Veronica to prove that Griffith is lying and says that he wasn't the man on the bridge.
- Woody Goodman tells Keith of his plan for Neptune, which involves incorporating the wealthy part of the town.
- Dick and Beaver's real mother shows up to unlock their trust funds.
- Duncan finds a letter in the vent in Meg's room and pockets it.
- Sheriff Lamb hints that he was abused by his own father; this is, presumably, his reason for letting Duncan and Veronica go and then returning to the Manning residence. This also marks one of the few times that he immediately takes Veronica seriously when she reports a crime. When cuffing her, he leans forward, to show that he wants her to whisper something in his ear. She then tells him where to look for the secret room.

== Music ==
The following songs are heard in the episode:

- "Pon de Replay" by Rihanna
- "The Nth Degree" by Morningwood
- "Run" by Air

== Production ==
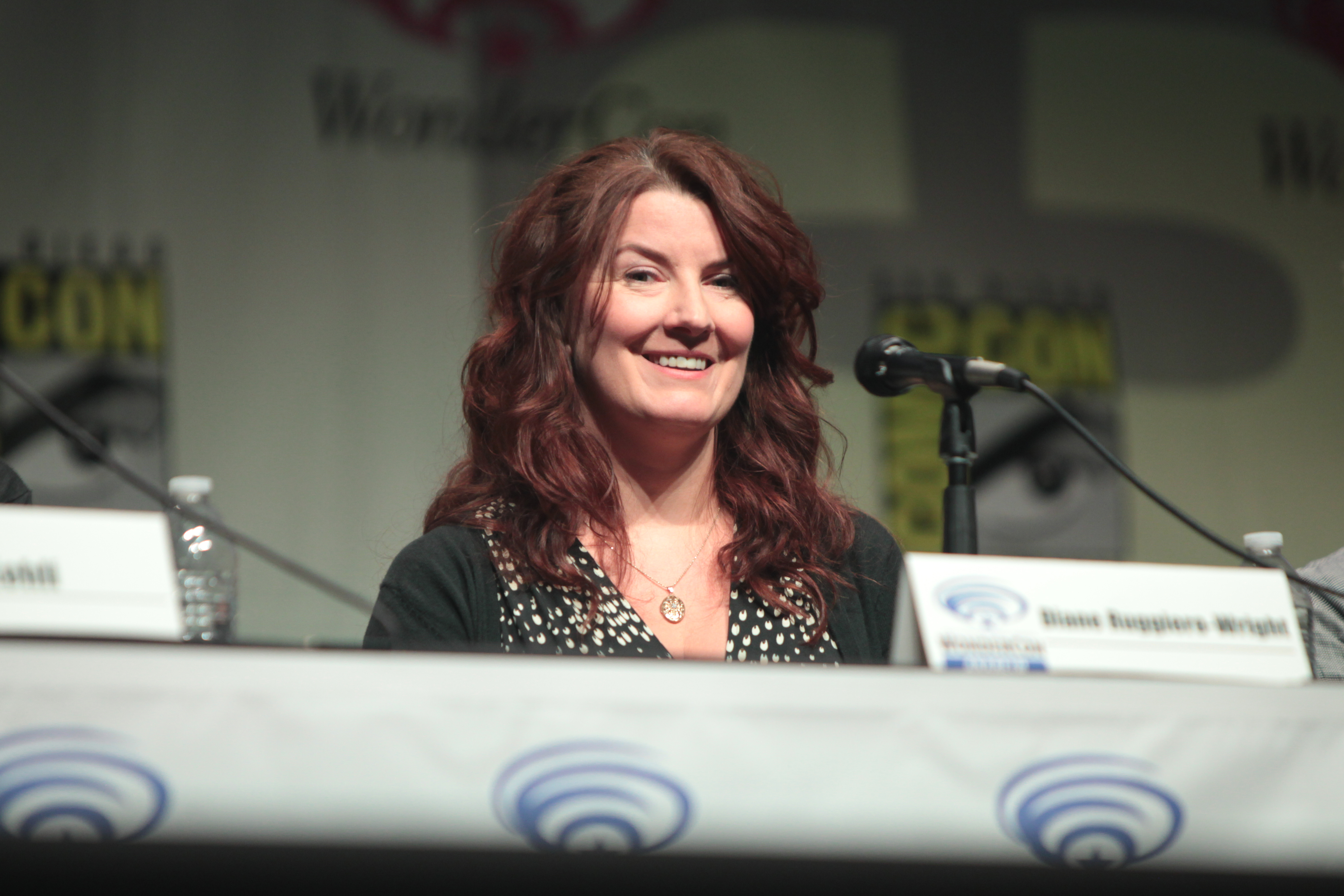
Diane Ruggiero wrote the episode.

The episode was written by Diane Ruggiero and directed by Nick Marck, marking Ruggiero's ninth writing credit for Veronica Mars and Marck's sixth directing credit for the show. Despite being credited, Weevil (Francis Capra), Wallace, and Jackie (Tessa Thompson) do not appear in "Nobody Puts Baby in a Corner." Among the episode's guest stars are important recurring characters, including Don Lamb (Michael Muhney), Gia Goodman (Krysten Ritter), Woody Goodman (Steve Guttenberg), and Kendall Casablancas (Charisma Carpenter). Ritter noted that her scene in the episode was one of the favorite scenes she filmed." The episode's title refers to a famous line spoken by the character Johnny (Patrick Swayze) in the 1987 coming-of-age romantic drama Dirty Dancing.

== Reception ==
=== Ratings ===
In its original broadcast, "Nobody Puts Baby in a Corner" received 2.94 million viewers, marking a decrease from "Rat Saw God".

=== Reviews ===
Rowan Kaiser, writing for The A.V. Club thought that the episode was quirky, especially in the scenes involving Veronica's babysitting. On the episode's tone, she added, "And this is fine. This is great, even. Combined with things like Veronica's vision of Lilly in the season premiere, it makes me think that Veronica Mars is moving in a much more metaphorical direction." Television Without Pity gave the episode a "B".

Price Peterson of TV.com gave a glowing review, writing that "Nobody Puts Baby in a Corner" was "[a]nother great episode, with its perfect blend of teenage awfulness (the slumber party), [and] Neptune's seedy underbelly…I mean, what's not to like? But really, the closing sequence in which Lamb arrested and then set free Veronica and Duncan was incredible. One of the more subtle and powerful moments I've seen on any TV show in a while."
