= Easy Money (1983 film) =

1983 film by James Signorelli

- Theatrical release poster
- Directed by: James Signorelli
- Written by: Rodney Dangerfield; Michael Endler; P. J. O'Rourke; Dennis Blair
- Produced by: Estelle Endler; John Nicolella
- Starring: Rodney Dangerfield; Joe Pesci; Geraldine Fitzgerald; Candy Azzara; Jennifer Jason Leigh
- Cinematography: Fred Schuler
- Edited by: Ronald Roose
- Music by: Laurence Rosenthal
- Distributed by: Orion Pictures
- Release date: August 19, 1983
- Running time: 96 minutes
- Country: United States
- Language: English
- Box office: $29.3 million

Easy Money is a 1983 American comedy film directed by James Signorelli, written by Rodney Dangerfield, Michael Endler, P. J. O'Rourke and Dennis Blair, and starring Dangerfield, Joe Pesci, Geraldine Fitzgerald, Candice Azzara, and Jennifer Jason Leigh. It tells the story of a hard-living baby photographer and family man whose snobbish mother-in-law dies in a plane crash where the conditions of his family's inheritance must have him curb his vices for a year. The original music score was composed by Laurence Rosenthal. Billy Joel performed the theme song "Easy Money" from his album An Innocent Man.

The film was met with mixed reviews.

== Plot ==
Montgomery "Monty" Capuletti is a hard-living, heavy-drinking, pot-smoking, gambling family man who makes his living as a baby photographer in New Dorp, Staten Island. He loves his wife Rose but has a very tense relationship with his wealthy, snobbish mother-in-law, Kathleen Monahan, who runs a successful department store chain and hates the way Monty acts and lives. There is an added ethnic rivalry between Monty and his wife's family, as he is Italian and they are Irish.

The irresponsible Monty cannot even pick up a wedding cake for his engaged daughter Allison without fouling up. He and his best friend Nicholas "Nicky" Cerone are smoking marijuana while driving, and an accident destroys the cake. Allison's wedding to Julio goes off without a hitch, at least until the wedding night, where Allison, a virgin, is uncomfortable about having sex, frustrating Julio. Julio makes routine unsuccessful dramatic efforts to win her over, unsuccessfully.

After Kathleen dies in a plane crash unexpectedly, his family is in for an inheritance. Attorney Daniel Scrappleton reveals that Kathleen left a stipulation in her will that if Monty is able to curb his vices for a year by going on a diet and giving up drugs and gambling, he will receive $10 million. If not, the family gets nothing and it will go to her nephew Clive Barlow. Monty's gambling and drinking buddies are also interested in whether or not Monty can really give up everything and bet whether or not he will make it. Despite this, Nicky is supportive and helps Monty during this time.

Monty and Nicky go to the mother-in-law's department store and find awkward fashions, catering to a clientele which clearly does not include the likes of Nicky and Monty. Nicky argues that it may not be worth it to Monty if this is the kind of atmosphere he will be exposed to, but Monty points out he must tough it out to provide for his wife and daughters, not just him. Meanwhile, Clive does his best to undermine Monty's resolve so the money and department store can instead be left to him. Clive sets up a clothing line designed to humiliate Monty, but even this is unsuccessful.

Monty ultimately reforms following four weeks in the hospital after accidentally being shot in the butt by Julio trying to prove himself. When the entire year is up, he, his family, and some of his friends celebrate aboard a boat. To his chagrin though, Kathleen turns up. She had faked her own death simply to persuade her slovenly son-in-law to straighten up. In addition, Clive was told by Scrappleton that he was also tested as Kathleen tells Clive that he failed. Ultimately though, she gives the money to Monty on the basis he upheld her stipulation.

Now rich, Monty and his family live in a mansion. Still in control, Kathleen denies Monty dessert and coffee then commands her butler to have a beer she found in the refrigerator be thrown out. Monty gleefully agrees to each action then says he is heading out for a walk while having the butler throw out the glazed fruit as well. Kathleen gloats about her actions and that she finally has Monty under control to her daughter's chagrin. Unbeknownst to Kathleen, Monty has actually proceeded to a hideaway under the house to join Nicky and his friends for pizza, poker, and beer while talking about his evening with the family.

== Cast ==
- Rodney Dangerfield as Montgomery "Monty" Capuletti, a baby photographer with a bunch of vices
- Joe Pesci as Nicky Cerone, the best friend of Monty.
- Geraldine Fitzgerald as Mrs. Kathleen Monahan, the mother-in-law of Monty and proprietor of Monahan's Department Store who is annoyed with his vices and irresponsibility.
- Candy Azzara as Rose Monahan Capuletti, the wife of Monty and daughter of Kathleen
- Jennifer Jason Leigh as Allison Capuletti Ocampo, the oldest daughter of Monty and Rose and the granddaughter of Kathleen
- Jeffrey Jones as Clive Barlow, the scheming nephew of Kathleen who manages Monahan's Department Store and a cousin of Rose
- Taylor Negron as Julio Ocampo, a man who is engaged to Allison
- Tom Noonan as Paddy, one of Monty's friends
- Val Avery as Louie, the Bartender
- Tom Ewell as Daniel Scrappleton, the attorney of Kathleen
- Lili Haydn as Belinda Capuletti, the youngest daughter of Monty and Rose and the granddaughter of Kathleen
- Kimberly McArthur as Ginger Jones
- Jeffrey Altman as Bill Jones
- Arch Johnson as Armory Vendor
- Mary Pat Gleason as Party Mother
- Eric Van Valkenburg and Richard Van Valkenburg as Clive Barlow's assistants
- Harsh Nayyar as Dr. Vindaloo, a doctor who tends to Monty's gunshot wound in the butt

== Release ==
=== Box office ===
Easy Money opened theatrically on August 19, 1983, and earned $5,844,974 in its opening weekend, ranking number one at the domestic box office, toppling the prior three-week #1 run of National Lampoon's Vacation. By the end of its run, the film grossed $29,309,766.

=== Critical reception ===
On Rotten Tomatoes, the film holds a 64% approval rating based on 11 reviews. Writing in the Chicago Tribune, critic Gene Siskel gave the film three stars out of four. He wrote that "the big discovery in the comedy 'Easy Money' is that Rodney Dangerfield, unlike most stand-up comics, does not need dialogue to be funny. He is funny just standing still—or his version of standing still, which includes nervous twitching, profuse sweating, pained expressions and rolling of the eyes." Siskel also called Easy Money "a film that's easy to like" and also praised Pesci's performance, calling him "the unsung hero of 'Easy Money,' an actor whose very appearance gives this little film a lot of class."

Roger Ebert of the Chicago Sun-Times gave the film a mixed rating, 2.5 stars out of 4. While Dangerfield had many funny scenes and the supporting cast was effective, Ebert felt the film was poorly-edited and suffered by blunting the "cynical and hard-edged" elements of Dangerfield's stage persona in an attempt to make him more likable.

Audiences polled by CinemaScore gave the film an average grade of "C+" on an A+ to F scale.

== See also ==
- List of American films of 1983
