= The House on Sorority Row =

1982 American slasher film by Mark Rosman

- Theatrical film poster
- Directed by: Mark Rosman
- Written by: Mark Rosman; Bobby Fine (additional dialogue)
- Produced by: John G. Clark
- Starring: Kathryn McNeil; Eileen Davidson; Janis Zido; Robin Meloy; Harley Kozak; Jodi Draigie; Ellen Dorsher; Christopher Lawrence; Lois Kelso Hunt
- Cinematography: Tim Suhrstedt
- Edited by: Paul Trejo; Jean-Marc Vasseur
- Music by: Richard Band
- Production company: VAE Productions
- Distributed by: Artists Releasing Corporation; Film Ventures International
- Release date: November 19, 1982
- Running time: 91 minutes
- Country: United States
- Language: English
- Budget: $425,000
- Box office: $3.8 million—$10.6 million

The House on Sorority Row is a 1982 American slasher film written and directed by Mark Rosman in his directorial debut, produced by John G. Clark, and starring Eileen Davidson and Kathryn McNeil. The plot follows a group of sorority sisters being stalked and murdered during their graduation party after they conceal a fatal prank against their house mother, Dorothy Slater.

Partially inspired by Les Diaboliques, first-time writer-director Rosman wrote the screenplay in 1980, then titled Seven Sisters. The film was shot on location in Pikesville in the summer of 1981, with additional photography in Los Angeles.

In November 1982, it received a limited theatrical release before expanding on January 21, 1983. The film was a box-office success, grossing between $3–10 million in the USA against a $425,000 budget. (Note: Sources vary regarding the film's final box office gross, with figures cited of $3.8 million, $8,184,633, and $10,604,986.) It received mixed reviews from film critics, with some praising its suspense and regarding it as superior to other slasher films of its time, while others felt it lacked originality.

Despite its mixed critical response, The House on Sorority Row has gained a cult following since its release, and it was named one of the greatest slasher films of all time by Complex in 2017. A remake, Sorority Row, was released in 2009.

== Plot ==
In 1981, seven sorority sisters—Katey Rose, Vicki, Liz, Jeanie, Diane, Morgan, and Stevie—celebrate their graduation at their sorority house on the far end of a sorority row. Their party is interrupted by the domineering house mother, Mrs. Dorothy Slater, who forbids the celebration.

Angered, the girls prank her by stealing her walking cane, placing it in the unused outdoor pool, and forcing her at gunpoint to retrieve it. Startled, Slater causes Vicki to accidentally fire the gun and seemingly shoot her. Panicked and desperate, the girls pulled Slater out of the pool so Stevie could administer mouth to mouth, but it's too late when Stevie didn't feel a pulse on Slater. To cover up the apparent murder, the girls hide Slater’s body in the pool.

At the ceremony, an unseen figure uses Slater’s cane to stab a partygoer. When guests attempt to enter the pool, the girls realize that turning on the lights will reveal the body. Stevie goes to the basement to disable the breaker, but is stabbed to death. Later, when the pool lights are switched on, Slater’s body is missing, heightening their alarm.

Convinced Slater is alive, the girls search for her. Morgan enters Slater’s room, only for the body to fall on her from the attic hatch. Vicki suggests hiding the body in an old cemetery. In the attic, Katey discovers children’s toys and a dead caged bird. Morgan is stabbed with Slater’s cane. Diane is murdered while starting a van to transport the body, and Jeanie is decapitated near the sorority house.

Katey finds a medical alert tag and calls the number, reaching Dr. Nelson Beck, who arrives at the house. Together, they discover Stevie, Morgan, and Diane’s bodies in the pool. Vicki and Liz drive to the cemetery with Slater’s body, but are killed by the assailant. Beck accompanies Katey to the cemetery, where they find Vicki and Liz’s bodies and Slater’s body still in the van.

Back at the house, Beck sedates Katey and reveals that Slater had a son, Eric, deformed and mentally impaired due to an illegal fertility treatment, whom he believes witnessed his mother's murder, to ultimately snap into homicidal rage. Beck plans to use Katey as bait to capture Eric and cover his crime. Eric arrives and kills Beck while Katey searches for Vicki’s gun, which fails to fire. She flees to the bathroom, discovers Jeanie’s severed head, and climbs to the attic. Eric attacks, and Katey shoots him repeatedly, before realizing the gun is loaded with blanks. Using a long spike that had attached an old doll's body to its head, she stabs Eric numerous times, causing him to fall through the attic door. Exhausted, Katey believes he is dead, but Eric opens his eyes.

== Cast ==
- Kathryn McNeil as Katherine "Katey" Rose
- Eileen Davidson as Vicki
- Janis Zido as Liz
- Robin Meloy as Jeanie
- Harley Kozak as Diane
- Jodi Draigie as Morgan
- Ellen Dorsher as Stevie
- Lois Kelso Hunt as Dorothy Slater
- Christopher Lawrence as Dr. Nelson Beck
- Michael Kuhn as Peter
- Michael Sergio as Rick
- Charles Serio as Eric Slater
- Ruth Walsh as Mrs. Rose

== Production ==
=== Screenplay ===
Writer-director Mark Rosman, who had attended the UCLA and later graduated from New York University, got the idea for The House on Sorority Row after returning to his hometown in Los Angeles. Rosman had been a fraternity member at UCLA, which he used as a partial basis for writing the screenplay, which focused on a group of sorority sisters who find their lives threatened after covering up a fatal prank. Some elements of the film, primarily the usage of a pool to conceal their crime, were inspired by Les Diaboliques (1955), a French suspense film directed by Henri-Georges Clouzot. He later stated he envisioned a suspense film in which "the female characters would not just be victims–the whole idea of it was that they were culpable, and that they were sort of bringing this on themselves". The screenplay had several working titles, including Screamer and Seven Sisters. Rosman initially accrued $125,000 as a starting budget, with the help of a friend who worked for VAE Productions, an independent studio that specialized in documentaries, based in Washington, D.C.

=== Casting ===
The majority of the casting for The House on Sorority Row took place in New York City, though Eileen Davidson and Janis Zido were cast out of the Los Angeles area. Davidson recalled auditioning at Rosman's house in Beverly Hills. Kate McNeil, who was cast in the role of Katherine "Katey" Rose, won the part while still attending graduate courses in New York City.

Harley Jane Kozak recalled attending a casting call in a "warehouse in Manhattan" and receiving the news via phone call weeks later that she had won the part of Diane. Lois Kelso Hunt, who portrays the housemother Dorothy Slater, was a local stage actress from Washington, D.C.

=== Filming ===
The House on Sorority Row was the directorial debut of Rosman and the first feature film of cinematographer Tim Suhrstedt. Both had met while working as assistant directors on Brian De Palma's Home Movies (1980). Filming took place on location in Pikesville, with establishing campus shots at the University of Maryland, in the summer of 1981. The production had originally been slated to shoot in Washington, D.C., where the production company was located. However, Rosman found the house location featured in the film in Pikesville, which was in foreclosure, allowing the crew to film for a low cost. Upon arriving at the house to shoot, the crew found two squatters living in the house, who they allowed to work as video assistants. Vincent Peranio, a frequent collaborator with John Waters, agreed to serve as the film's production designer, and dressed the entire house to appear as a sorority.

The initial budget for the film was $300,000. However, the production ran out of funds midway through filming, and Rosman had to secure a loan from a cousin in Los Angeles in order to complete the film. Throughout principal photography, the cast stayed at Koinonia, a farm retreat in Pikesville where they lived together in "dorm-like" conditions. The film was a non-SAG production, and Kozak and McNeil both recall receiving $50 per diem compensation for their days on set.

While principal photography occurred exclusively in Maryland, additional transitional shots and pickups were completed in Los Angeles. Among these was the shot of Davidson's character, Vicki, being impaled through the eye with the cane.

=== Post-production ===
FVI, an independent distributor, purchased the film for distribution after principal photography was complete, and also gave the filmmakers an additional $125,000 to complete post-production (the majority of which went toward scoring and mixing). In an interview with director Mark Rosman, it was revealed that Lois Kelso Hunt's performance is entirely dubbed, as her natural speaking voice was deemed not "scary" enough for the role of Mrs. Slater. While her demeanor and performance were apt, Rosman found her voice not as husky as he had envisioned.

According to Rosman, Film Ventures requested two changes to the final cut of the film: The first was that the opening flashback scene, which was shot in black and white, be colourised; the sequence was then color-tinted to be black and blue. The second change was regarding the original ending. In the director's original ending, Katherine is discovered floating dead in the pool, apparently Eric's final victim. Film Ventures felt the ending was too downbeat, so Katherine survives in the finished version.

=== Music ===
The film's music score was written by Richard Band and performed by the London Philharmonic Orchestra, recorded at Wembley Studios. The Washington, D.C.–based power pop band 4 Out of 5 Doctors appears in the movie, performing several of their songs.

La-La Land Records issued a disc of the score in 2015. Terror Vision subsequently reissued the score on vinyl in 2021.

== Release ==
The one-sheet poster and advertising were created by Film Ventures International's regular advertising agency, Design Projects Incorporated. Design Project's owner, Rick Albert, art-directed the key art and title treatment design. The key art was illustrated by Jack Leynnwood, who painted illustrations for many motion picture campaigns during the late 1970s and '80s. The copylines were written by distributor Film Ventures International's Edward L. Montoro.

Initially, Metro-Goldwyn-Mayer expressed interest in distributing the film but ultimately backed out, after which Film Ventures International acquired distribution rights. The House on Sorority Row was given a limited theatrical release on November 19, 1982 in the USA, opening in Albuquerque and Las Vegas. The theatrical release expanded to major cities such as Los Angeles on January 21, 1983.

The film was released in the UK in December 1983 under the title House of Evil.

=== Home media ===
Elite Entertainment released The House on Sorority Row on DVD in November 2000. The disc featured the film's original theatrical trailer as a supplementary feature. The DVD was reissued on November 18, 2003. It was again re-released on January 12, 2010, to commemorate the film's 25th anniversary.

Scorpion Releasing and Katarina's Nightmare Theater released a remastered edition on a 2-disc Blu-ray/DVD combo in January 2011. Scorpion Releasing and Code Red released a new Blu-ray edition on May 11, 2018, featuring a new 2K scan of the original master negative. This edition, sold exclusively online and limited to 1,600 units, features a slipcover and newly commissioned artwork.

MVD Entertainment Group issued another Blu-ray edition on July 6, 2021, featuring an alternate mono audio version of the film with a re-timed pre-credits sequence as a new bonus feature; a limited foldout poster of the film's theatrical one-sheet was also included.

== Reception ==
=== Box office ===
During its opening limited release in Las Vegas in November 1982, The House on Sorority Row sold out showings and out-grossed Creepshow, Poltergeist, and An Officer and a Gentleman at area theaters. Following its expanded release in January 1983, the film opened with a weekend earning of $617,661, showing on 153 screens, ranking #15 at the box office. The film grossed between $3.8 million–$10 million domestically.

=== Critical response ===
==== Contemporary ====
Anthony DellaFlora of the Albuquerque Journal wrote: "[Horror films] are supposed to put you in a state of unmitigated terror. This one does neither. The House on Sorority Row may have brought new meaning to the term "Greek tragedy", but it certainly didn't scare anyone. Mark Rosman, who produced, directed and wrote the alleged thriller must take most of the blame for this". Lou Cedrone of The Baltimore Sun felt that there were "no surprises" or mystery in the film, adding that "the movie, bad as it is, is great fun if you are part of an audience that talks back to it". Bill Hagen of the News-Pilot noted that "What sets [the film] apart is Rosman's knack for interrupting the inevitable slaughter with some wonderful scenes of dark humor, little twists of which not only De Palma, but even Hitchcock, might approve."

Stephen Hunter, also of the Baltimore Sun, felt the film was similarly predictable, but noted that "technically, the strongest element in the production is the photography, which is keen-edged, brightly colored and evocative", comparing it to the film of R.W. Fassbinder. Ted Mahar, writing for The Oregonian, praised the film's lush musical score, but was otherwise unimpressed, summarizing the film as "a phenomenon of gory mediocrity, a persistent avoidance of originality or interesting variation. Some sense of cleverness or literary style might have made it at least satirical or subtly parodistic. But it's stolid, perfunctory, and calculated; the only real question in the film is whether Rosman's contempt for the genre exceeds that for the audience."

Film scholar Adam Rockoff notes that the film was frequently compared to the films of Brian De Palma upon release, as Rosman had previously worked as an assistant for De Palma. Frank Hagen, published in the Standard-Speaker, favorably compared the film to the works of De Palma and Alfred Hitchcock, adding that it is "cuts above the routine rip-and-slash fare... Rosman knows how to maintain suspense and deliver a shock or two". Kevin Thomas of the Los Angeles Times praised the film as a "skillfully made horror picture that builds suspense and terror in which obligatory gore is presented with surprising restraint", ultimately deeming it a "promising debut from writer-director Rosman". The Daily Press's Henry Edgar echoed this sentiment, writing that the film favors suspense over gore, noting it as a "quality" thriller, and praising the performances of McNeil and Davidson, describing them as "credible" and "cunning, and realistic", respectively.

==== Retrospective ====
On the review aggregator website Rotten Tomatoes, 50% of 12 critics' reviews are positive, with an average rating of 5.2/10. Metacritic, which uses a weighted average, assigned the film a score of 50 out of 100, based on 4 critics, indicating "mixed or average" reviews.

Film scholar Scott Aaron Stine notes that the film has "competent production values, but this in no way compensates for the rote proceedings". John Kenneth Muir refers to the film as "a textbook example of the 1980s slasher film" that "boasts a devilish sense of humor". Critic Jim Harper notes the film as a moralistic slasher film and probable influence on films such as I Know What You Did Last Summer (1997).

== Remake ==
A remake titled Sorority Row was released by Summit Entertainment in 2009. The film was directed by Stewart Hendler, with Mark Rosman, the director of the original, serving as an executive producer. It stars Briana Evigan, Leah Pipes, Rumer Willis, Jamie Chung, Audrina Patridge, Margo Harshman, and Carrie Fisher. The script was rewritten by Josh Stolberg and Pete Goldfinger.

== Legacy ==
In 2017, Complex named The House on Sorority Row the 21st-best slasher film of all time, writing: "The House on Sorority Row is, fortunately, more than just a puberty motivator for young boys. Director Mark Rosman does his best to stage prolonged moments of suspense, approaching the film’s kill scenes with his Hitchcock influences intact". Filmmaker Quentin Tarantino included the film in his inaugural film festival in 1997, screening it alongside other horror films such as Don't Go in the House (1980) and The Beyond (1981).

In September 2018, the film received a nationwide one-night revival screening through Bloody Disgusting's Retro Nightmares Cinema Series.

The House on Sorority Row is mentioned in the 1997 film Scream 2, along with four other college-themed slasher films: The Dorm That Dripped Blood, Splatter University, Graduation Day, and Final Exam.

== See also ==
- List of horror films set in academic institutions

== Sources ==
- Donahue, Suzanne Mary (1987). American Film Distribution: The Changing Marketplace. Ann Arbor, Michigan: UMI Research Press. ISBN 978-0-835-71776-2.
- Harper, Jim (2004). Legacy of Blood: A Comprehensive Guide to Slasher Movies. Manchester, England: Critical Vision. ISBN 978-1-900-48639-2.
- Muir, John Kenneth (2012). Horror Films of the 1980s. Vol. 1. Jefferson, North Carolina: McFarland & Company. ISBN 978-0-786-47298-7.
- Rockoff, Adam (2016) [2002]. Going to Pieces: The Rise and Fall of the Slasher Film, 1978-1986. Jefferson, North Carolina: McFarland. ISBN 978-0-786-49192-6.
- Rosman, Mark; McNeil, Katherine; Davidson, Eileen (2011). The House on Sorority Row (Blu-ray audio commentary). Disc 1. Scorpion Releasing.
- Stine, Scott Aaron (2003). The Gorehound's Guide to Splatter Films of the 1980s. Jefferson, North Carolina: McFarland. ISBN 978-0-786-41532-8.
