= Lois Kelso Hunt =

American actress

- Undated photo of Hunt
- Born: Lois Marie Kelso; July 16, 1926; Oak Park, Illinois, U.S.
- Died: May 20, 2018 (aged 91); Alexandria, Virginia, U.S.
- Education: University of Michigan; Columbia University
- Occupations: Actress; teacher
- Spouse: Leon Hunt (m. 1954; div. 1985)
- Children: 4

Lois Marie Kelso Hunt (July 16, 1926 – May 20, 2018) was an American actress, theater director, and arts advocate. A native of Oak Park, Illinois, she studied at the University of Michigan and Columbia University before pursuing a career as an English and drama teacher. Hunt relocated to Alexandria, Virginia in 1965, where she acted in local theater productions, and served as a director and producer of a touring production of Malcolm Boyd's They Aren't Real to Me (1966–1968).

Hunt made her feature film debut portraying a domineering house mother in The House on Sorority Row (1982), which went on to become a cult film. She later appeared onscreen as a guest star on the series Homicide: Life on the Street in 1995, and later in a minor part in the comedy film Head of State (2003). Hunt spent much of her later life dedicated to various humanitarian and philanthropic causes in Alexandria. She died at Inova Alexandria Hospital of pneumonia in 2018, aged 91.

== Biography ==
Hunt was born Lois Marie Kelso in Oak Park, Illinois on July 16, 1926 to Hugh Donnally Kelso and Lou Lillian Hammerlund. She attended the University of Michigan, where she worked as a member of the student newspaper. She subsequently earned a graduate degree from Columbia University, and began her career as a schoolteacher, teaching English and drama at Passaic Valley High School and St. Mary’s Hall, both in New Jersey. In February 1954, she married Leon Gibson Hunt in Mountain Lakes, New Jersey.

In 1965, Hunt relocated to Alexandria, Virginia, and worked as a stage actress, appearing in productions for the Washington, D.C. Arena Stage, Studio Theatre, Castle Performing Arts Center, and the Jewish Community Center. From 1966 to 1968, Hunt toured as a director and producer of a stage production of They Aren't Real to Me, a one-act play by Episcopalian priest and gay rights activist Malcolm Boyd.

In 1982, Hunt made her feature film debut in the slasher film The House on Sorority Row, portraying a domineering housemother murdered by her sorority. Her performance was dubbed in post-production as her voice was not deemed menacing enough for the role. No less, the picture went on to become a cult film. On December 31, 1985, Hunt divorced her husband, Leon, following a one-year separation. She would later appear onscreen again in an episode of Homicide: Life on the Street in 1995 ("Fire: Part II"), and had a minor role in the comedy Head of State (2003).

Hunt spent her later years dedicated to philanthropic and humanitarian causes in Alexandria, serving on the Alexandria Beautification Commission, and was also the chair of the Bicentennial Trees of Alexandria. She was also president of the Taylor Run Civic Association, and volunteered time to Meals on Wheels and the Episcopal Peace Fellowship. Hunt was a member of various political and humanitarian organizations, including the League of Women Voters, the American Association of University Women, Amnesty International, and the Alexandria Democratic Committee.

== Death ==
Hunt died of pneumonia at Inova Alexandria Hospital in Alexandria, aged 91. She was predeceased by her eldest son, Nathaniel, who died in a swimming accident in 2011, as well as her former husband, Leon Hunt. She was survived by three other children.

== Filmography ==
Year	Title	Role	Notes	Ref.
1982	The House on Sorority Row	Dorothy Slater		
1995	Homicide: Life on the Street	Mrs. Rosen	Episode: "Fire: Part II"	
2003	Head of State	Lewis' Mother		
