= Robin Meloy Goldsby =

American pianist, composer, and memoirist

Robin Meloy Goldsby is an American pianist, composer, and memoirist. Born in Pittsburgh, Pennsylvania, she is the daughter of drummer Bob Rawsthorne, who was one of the musicians on the PBS television show "Mister Rogers' Neighborhood." She attended Chatham College before moving to New York City in 1980. She started playing in piano bars during summers on Nantucket Island while working her way through Chatham College, and that eventually became her career. She is married to bass player John Goldsby. They have two children, Curtis Goldsby and Julia Goldsby. They currently live in Germany.

Robin is the author of RHYTHM: A Novel, and Piano Girl: A Memoir. Her career as a musician has taken her from roadside dives to New York City's poshest venues, exclusive resorts, and on to the European castles where she now performs. Robin has three solo piano recordings to her name: Twilight, Somewhere in Time, and Songs from the Castle, and has appeared on NPR's All Things Considered and Piano Jazz with Marian McPartland.

Meloy also had a role as Jeanie, one of the seven doomed sorority sisters in Mark Rosman's 1983 cult slasher The House on Sorority Row. For the audition, in contrast with other actresses, Meloy wore a baggy T-shirt, glasses, and sweatpants to attain the role.
