= Dennis Blair (comedian) =

American stand-up comedian

Dennis Blair (born February 21, 1955) is an American stand-up comedian.

== Career ==
He is known for writing and appearing in the 1983 movie Easy Money, alongside his mentor, Rodney Dangerfield. He wrote for and with Dangerfield for four years including sketches for his network specials and jokes for his act. He provided the voice of Lem and Clem in the animated film Rover Dangerfield.

In 2003, he wrote a Broadway musical called Laughing Room Only, starring Jackie Mason.

In 1998 he and Dug McGuirck produced "I Sleep Naked in the Rain", an album of songs from a then unproduced one man show with music.

He was a co-writer of the program for the 2005 and the 2006 Writers Guild Awards.

He is also a singer and songwriter, having contributed the song "Ordinary Man" to the Easy Money soundtrack. Dennis and his songwriting partner John Durkin won the top-40 prize in "The American Song Festival." The duo won first place in the country music category of the Indie Music Channel's Radio Music Award for their song, "She Stayed".

Blair was the creative consultant on the album Rappin Rodney, which was nominated for a Grammy. He also co-wrote the album's title song.
