= King Cosmos =

Henry Gomez, known professionally as King Cosmos, is a Trinidadian and Tobagonian-Canadian musician, actor and educator. Born and raised in Princess Town, Trinidad, he was exposed to music at an early age. Today he is recognized as one of Canada’s best known performers of Caribbean music. He is an indie recording artist at DAGGA label and is most known for his hit single Island Girl.

== Early life ==
Henry Gomez was born in Princess Town, Trinidad and Tobago to a musical family which includes famed band leader Johnny Gomez and Gomez of parang fame in Lopinot. At an early age he moved to Toronto, Canada and decided to start a career based on his love for calypso music and rhythmic beats.

He graduated from the University of Toronto with a B.A. and a B.E.D. He also completed a Master of Fine Arts at York University and acting classes at Ryerson University.

== Career ==
Gomez lives and records in Toronto, Canada where he continues to use his writing and performing skills in aims to keep the calypso culture vibrant. In 1990 he released his first album Culture Shock. His other releases include Half Breed (1998), Dis one hot (1997), Fire (2000) and More Fire (2005).

He has performed both nationally from Quebec to Alberta and internationally. In 2005 he represented Canada at the Chinese New Year Festival in Hong Kong. Other venues he has performed at include the North York Centre for the Performing Arts, Lula Lounge, Fortress North, The Caribana Arts and Cultural Festival (Olympic Island) and The Queen Elizabeth Theatre. On 9 and 10 July 2005 Gomez hosted the 17th Annual Afrofest at Queens Park Toronto. He has also appeared on the Mike Bullard Show.

In 1982 Gomez played the character Brolley in director David Cronenberg's Videodrome.

In 1995 Gomez appeared in the comedy Tommy Boy alongside Chris Farley and David Spade. Gomez was also featured in the documentary Ian Jones: Activist Artist, How the Steel Pan is Changing Lives in 2008.

Apart from his entertainment career, Gomez also taught high school at Cedarbrae C.I. He retired in June 2012.

== Discography ==
- Culture Shock (1990)
- Half Breed (1998)
- Dis One Hot (1997)
- Fire (2000)
- More Fire (2005)

== Filmography ==
Year	Title	Role
1982	Videodrome	Brolley
1995	Tommy Boy	Air Port Cop
2008	Ian Jones: Activist Artist, How the Steel Pan is Changing Lives	Himself

== Awards and nominations ==
- 1980, Chalmers Award (Winner)
- 1995, Canadian Calypso Monarch
- 1998, Canadian Reggae Music Award (Nominated)
- 1998, Sunshine award (Nominated)
