= Michael Sergio =

American actor, filmmaker, and celebrity baseball fan

Michael Sergio is an actor, director, writer and producer best known for parachuting into Shea Stadium during Game 6 of the 1986 World Series, wearing a sign proclaiming "Go Mets". Immediately arrested, Sergio spent a short time in jail because he would not reveal the name of the pilot who flew him over Queens that evening. Senator Al D'Amato later intervened on his behalf, and Sergio was released.

== Career ==
Michael Sergio portrayed Rick in the cult classic slasher film The House on Sorority Row (1983).

He won a Daytime Emmy for directing the Ringling Bros. 1996 TV Circus Special and was nominated for a Daytime Emmy Award for Outstanding Special Class Directing for Creating the Wizard of Oz on Ice at the 23rd Daytime Emmy Awards.

Sergio also wrote and directed the independent feature Under Hellgate Bridge (2000), featuring The Sopranos regulars Dominic Chianese, Vincent Pastore, and Frank Vincent.

== Filmography ==
=== Actor ===
Michael Sergio film and television actor credits
Year	Title	Role	Notes
1983	The House on Sorority Row	Rick	Film
1986–1987	Loving	Gus	TV series
1989	The Equalizer	Disimone	Episode: "The Sins of Our Fathers"
1989	Kojak: Fatal Flaw	Thompson	TV movie
1990–1992	Mathnet	Sgt. Abruzzi	4 episodes
2024	Anora	Judge	Film

== See also ==
- James Miller (parachutist)
