= Seeding of a Ghost =

1983 Hong Kong film by Chuan Yang

- Directed by: Chuan Yang
- Screenplay by: Lam Yee Hung
- Story by: Kamber Huang
- Produced by: Run Run Shaw; Runme Shaw; Mona Fong
- Starring: Phillip Ko; Maria Yuen; Norman Chui
- Cinematography: Hsin Yeh Li
- Edited by: Hsing-Lung Chiang; Yen Hai Li
- Music by: Chin Yung Shing; Chen-Hou Su
- Distributed by: Shaw Brothers Studio
- Release date: 29 December 1983
- Running time: 90 minutes
- Country: Hong Kong
- Language: Cantonese

Seeding of a Ghost (种鬼) is a 1983 Hong Kong horror film directed by Chuan Yang.

== Plot ==
Following the prediction of a dark magician, the unfaithful wife of a Hong Kong taxi driver falls victim to a pair of murderous thugs. Outraged, the taxi driver arranges supernatural vengeance with the aid of an unholy union between the dead.

== Release ==
The film was released on DVD in the United States by Image Entertainment in 2008.
