= Kate McNeil =

American actress

- Born: August 7, 1959 (age 67); Philadelphia, Pennsylvania, U.S.
- Occupation: Actress
- Years active: 1981–present
- Spouse: Roy Friedland (m. 1987) (2 children)

Kate McNeil (born August 7, 1959) is an American actress. She starred in the CBS daytime soap opera As the World Turns from 1981 to 1984, and in 1983 had the leading role in the slasher film The House on Sorority Row. McNeil was also the female lead in the 1988 horror film Monkey Shines.

== Early years ==
The daughter of the president of the U.S. Cocoa Corporation, McNeil grew up in Gladwyne, a suburb in Lower Merion Township, of Montgomery County, west of Philadelphia, in the Commonwealth of Pennsylvania. In high school, she said, "I was in a lot of plays, and I was a bit wild." She went on to study theater further at Ithaca College, in Ithaca, New York.

== Career ==
McNeil began her acting career on the daytime soap opera As the World Turns in 1981. The following year of 1982, she appeared in the low-budget comedy Beach House. The next year, she starred in the slasher / horror film The House on Sorority Row. 1985, saw Kate McNeil appearing in the TV miniseries Kane & Abel and afterwards in 1986 she was featured in another miniseries, the historical epic about the American Civil War (1861–1865), the sequel / second of three in the series, North and South Book II, based on the thick three-volumes set of historical fiction books North and South by acclaimed author John Jakes (1932–2023). She later co-starred in director George A. Romero's horror film Monkey Shines two years afterwards in 1988. In the 1990s, Kate McNeil appeared as Janet Gilchrist, fiancé and then wedded wife of famous TV teen-ager character of the 1970s, now older and more mature main character "John Boy" Walton (Richard Thomas, born 1951), in the final three of subsequent six sequel / reunion made-for-TV films aired in the 1990s (1993, 1995 and 1997), following the long-running The Waltons TV series of 1971/1972 to 1981.

Also in the early 1990s, McNeil was a cast member of two television shows, WIOU and Bodies of Evidence. McNeil has also made numerous individual television episodes with guest appearances. She has appeared on Amazing Stories (1987), Simon & Simon, Designing Women, Midnight Caller, Quantum Leap (1989), The X-Files, Murder, She Wrote, Touched by an Angel (S8, Ep21), Babylon 5, Diagnosis Murder, Veronica Mars, Bones, The Mentalist, and Mad Men.

== Personal life ==
McNeil has been married to Roy Friedland, a director and script writer, since 1987. They have two children.

== Filmography ==
=== Film ===
| Year | Title | Role | Notes |
|---|---|---|---|
| 1982 | Beach House | Cindy | |
| 1983 | The House on Sorority Row | Katherine 'Katey' Rose | |
| 1988 | Monkey Shines | Melanie Parker | |
| 1994 | I'll Do Anything | Stacy | |
| 1995 | Sudden Death | Kathi | |
| 1997 | Shadow Dancer | Det. Frances Hayes | |
| 2000 | Space Cowboys | Female Astronaut No. 1 | |
| 2001 | The Caveman's Valentine | Betty | |
| 2001 | Glitter | Karen Diana | |
| 2002 | Until Morning | Gillian Scott | |

=== Television ===
| Year | Title | Role | Notes |
|---|---|---|---|
| 1981–1984 | As the World Turns | Karen Haines Stenbeck Dixon | TV series |
| 1985 | Kane and Abel | Florentyna Rosnovski | TV miniseries |
| 1986 | Vital Signs | Kristi | TV film |
| 1986 | North and South | Augusta Barclay | TV miniseries |
| 1987 | Amazing Stories | Patty O'Neil | Episode: "Blue Man Down" |
| 1988 | Simon & Simon | Trish Van Alder | Episode: "The Richer They Are the Harder They Fall" |
| 1988, 1993 | Murder, She Wrote | Carrie Palmer, Kate Walden | Episodes: "Harbinger of Death", "A Virtual Murder" |
| 1989 | Designing Women | Libby Coker | Episode: "The Junies" |
| 1989–90 | Anything but Love | Gail | Episodes: "Hearts and Bones", "Partying Is Such Sweet Sorrow" |
| 1990 | Midnight Caller | Rev. Summer | Episode: "Planes" |
| 1990 | The Bakery | Dana Buchanan | TV film |
| 1990–91 | WIOU | Taylor Young | Main role |
| 1991 | Dear John | Carol | Episode: "Kirk's Ex-Wife" |
| 1992–93 | Bodies of Evidence | Det. Nora Houghton | Main role |
| 1993 | Quantum Leap | Olivia Barrett Covington | Episode: "The Leap Between States" |
| 1993 | A Walton Thanksgiving Reunion | Janet Gilchrist | TV film |
| 1994 | Babylon 5 | Janice Rosen | Episode: "The Quality of Mercy" |
| 1995 | A Walton Wedding | Janet Gilchrist | TV film |
| 1995 | Best Defense | Michelle Best | TV film |
| 1996 | Diagnosis: Murder | Jennifer Stratton / Joan | Episode: "Murder Murder" |
| 1996 | Escape Clause | Sarah Ramsay | TV film |
| 1997 | A Walton Easter | Janet Gilchrist Walton | TV film |
| 1997 | Sleeping with the Devil | Liz | TV film |
| 1997 | Promised Land | Laura Dunbar | Episode: "To Everything a Season" |
| 1998–99 | Love Boat: The Next Wave | Pat Kennedy | Episodes: "Smooth Sailing", "Getting to Know You", "Love Floats: The St. Valentine's Day Massacre" |
| 1999 | Providence | Randi | Episode: "Pig in Providence" |
| 1999 | Ally McBeal | Marianne Harper | Episode: "Let's Dance" |
| 1999 | Half a Dozen Babies | Lynda Smirz | TV film |
| 2000 | The X-Files | Nan Wieder | Episode: "Theef" |
| 2000 | Nash Bridges | Rose Torry | Episode: "Hard Cell" |
| 2000 | One Kill | Maj. Leslie Nesbitt | TV film |
| 2000 | American Tragedy | Dr. Clarkson | TV film |
| 2001 | Family Law | Jenny | TV series |
| 2001 | CSI: Crime Scene Investigation | Sharon Woodbury | Episode: "Chaos Theory" |
| 2001 | ER | Mrs. Pendry | Episode: "Partly Cloudy, Chance of Rain" |
| 2002 | Touched by an Angel | Sarah Berrington | Episode: "For All the Tea in China" |
| 2003–04 | American Dreams | Doris Mason | Episodes: "The Long Goodbye", "Chasing the Past", "No Way Out" |
| 2004 | NCIS | Comm. Margaret Green | Episode: "The Good Samaritan" |
| 2004 | Without a Trace | Atty. Marian Costello | Episode: "Two Families" |
| 2005 | Cold Case | Beth Adams | Episode: "Blank Generation" |
| 2005 | Star Trek: Enterprise | Cmdr. Collins | Episode: "Affliction" |
| 2005 | Veronica Mars | Betina Casablancas | Episode: "Nobody Puts Baby in a Corner" |
| 2005 | Bones | Audrey Schilling | Episode: "The Girl in the Fridge" |
| 2008 | The Mentalist | Katherine Blakely | Episode: "The Thin Red Line" |
| 2010 | Proposition 8 Trial Re-Enactment | Christine Van Aken | TV documentary |
| 2010 | Law & Order: LA | Patricia Nelson | Episode: "Pasadena" |
| 2011 | Big Love | Sister Mary | Episodes: "A Seat at the Table", "Certain Poor Shepherds" |
| 2012 | Mad Men | Edith Huff | Episode: "Dark Shadows" |
| 2012 | Longmire | Maureen Mace | Episode: "An Incredibly Beautiful Thing" |
| 2012 | NCIS: Los Angeles | Carol Adams | Episode: "Recruit" |
| 2016 | Code Black | Anne Stringer | Episode: "Blood Sport" |
| 2016 | Grey's Anatomy | Tess' Mom | Episode: "I Am Not Waiting Anymore" |
| 2021 | Them | Dr. Frances Moynihan | Episodes: "Day 9", "Day 10" |
