= Barry Michael Cooper =

American screenwriter (1958–2025)

- Born: June 12, 1958; Harlem, New York, U.S.
- Died: January 22, 2025 (aged 66); Baltimore, Maryland, U.S.
- Occupations: Writer, producer, director
- Notable work: New Jack City; Sugar Hill; Above the Rim

Barry Michael Cooper (June 12, 1958 – January 22, 2025) was an American writer, producer, and director, best known for his screenplays for the films New Jack City (1991), Sugar Hill (1994), and Above the Rim (1994), sometimes called his "Harlem Trilogy".

== Background ==
Cooper was born in Harlem, New York, and grew up in Little Washington Heights between 164th and 165th streets on Amsterdam Avenue. He has stated that the neighborhood was very diverse and that he played with Black, Jewish, and White children. When he was ten, his family moved to the Esplanade Gardens, a co-op high rise in Harlem with tenants of various classes and races.

Cooper died in Baltimore, Maryland, on January 21 or 22, 2025.

== Career ==
Cooper began his writing career as a music critic for The Village Voice, serving later as an investigative reporter for the New York City alt-weekly from 1980 to 1989. He wrote "Teddy Riley's New Jack Swing: Harlem Gangsters Raise a Genius" for the Voice in 1987 and is credited with naming the then-new hybrid of R&B and rap. That same year, Cooper's article, "Kids Killing Kids: New Jack City Eats Its Young", published in the Village Voice, brought him to the attention of Quincy Jones, who hired him to rewrite a screenplay about 1970s Harlem heroin dealer Nicky Barnes. Cooper's screenplay was later produced as the film New Jack City (1991), which he set in Harlem after the arrival of crack cocaine in the 1980s.

It was the first film in what has been called Cooper's "Harlem Trilogy", which also includes Sugar Hill and Above the Rim (co-written with Jeff Pollack, the film's director, from a story by Pollack and Benny Medina), both of which were released in 1994. According to Spin magazine's Michael Gonzales, the three films had an influence on "hip-hop culture that can be heard in Jay-Z's lyrics and seen in P. Diddy's style".

Cooper wrote all three films after moving to Baltimore, Maryland, where he lived until his death. In 2005, Cooper made his directorial debut with Blood on the Wall$, a 14-part web series starring Sugar Hill's Michael Wright.

In 2008, Cooper produced the Larry Davis episode for season three of BET's crime documentary, American Gangster. Thus far, the Larry Davis episode has been the highest-rated original-series telecast in BET's history.

Starting in 2007, Cooper published a blog, "Hooked on the American Dream". In 2011, he published Hooked on the American Dream, Vol. 1: New Jack City Eats Its Young, a collection of his essays and articles from the 1980s, in an Amazon Kindle edition. He was also a contributor to the Huffington Post.

From 2017 to 2019, Cooper was a producer on the Netflix television series She's Gotta Have It and also wrote 3 of the show's episodes.

== Honors and awards ==
- Best Magazine Feature, 1987, Ball State University, and Best Magazine Feature, 1987, National Association of Black Journalists, for "In Cold Blood: The Baltimore Teen Murders," published in the May 1986 issue of Spin
