= List of Paul Giamatti performances =

Paul Giamatti is an American actor.

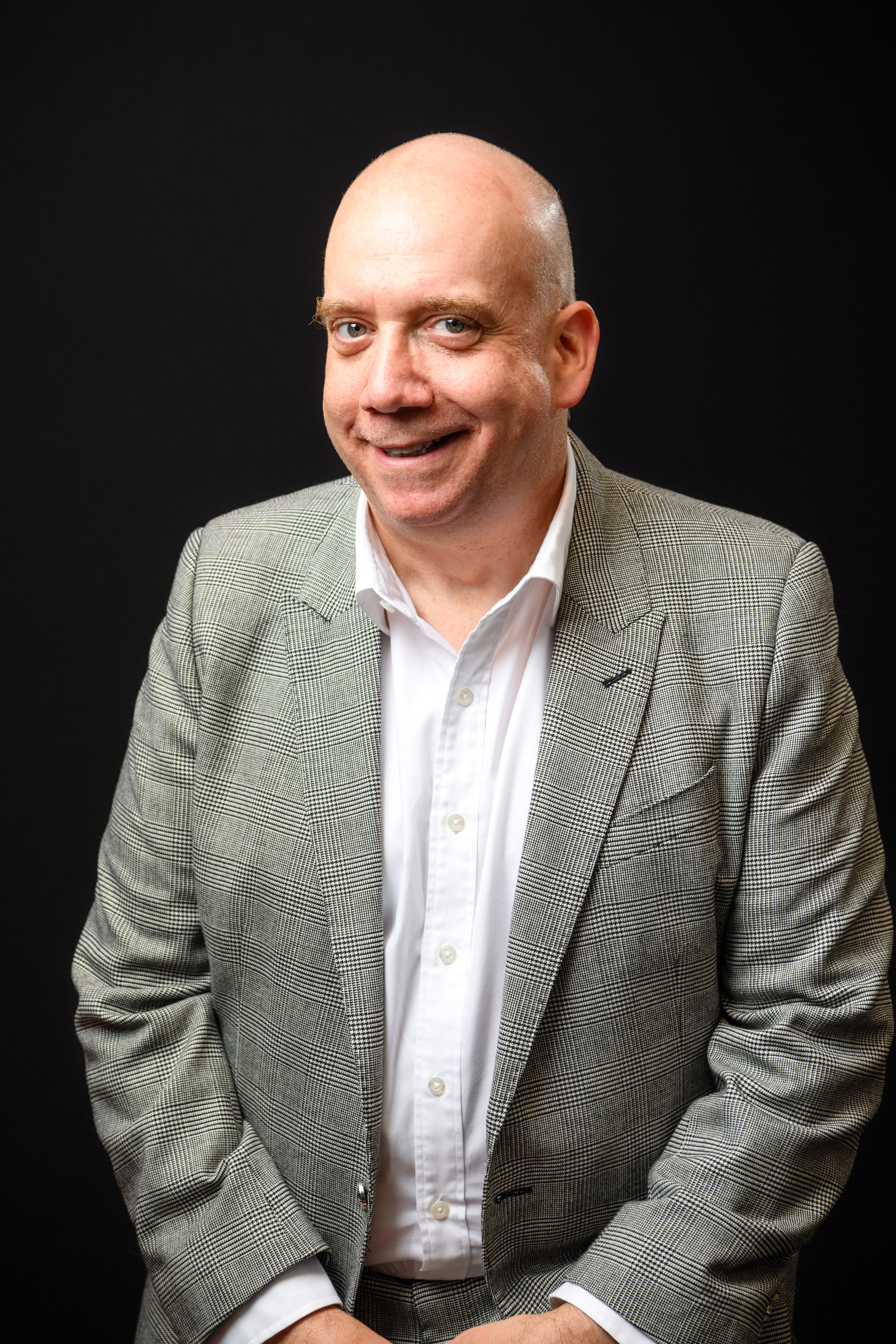
Giamatti in 2024

== Film ==
Year	Title	Role	Director	Notes	Refs.
1991	Past Midnight	Larry Canipe	Jan Eliasberg		
1992	Singles	Kissing Man	Cameron Crowe		
1995	Mighty Aphrodite	Extras Guild Researcher	Woody Allen		
1995	Sabrina	Scott	Sydney Pollack		
1996	Breathing Room	George	Jon Sherman		
1996	Before and After	Member of the Jury	Barbet Schroeder	Uncredited	
1997	Arresting Gena	Detective Wilson	Hannah Weyer		
1997	Donnie Brasco	FBI Technician	Mike Newell		
1997	Private Parts	Kenny "Pig Vomit" Rushton	Betty Thomas		
1997	My Best Friend's Wedding	Richard the Bellman	P. J. Hogan		
1997	Deconstructing Harry	Professor Abbot	Woody Allen		
1997	A Further Gesture	Hotel Clerk	Robert Dornhelm		
1998	The Truman Show	Control Room Director	Peter Weir		
1998	Dr. Dolittle	Blaine Hammersmith	Betty Thomas	Uncredited	
1998	Saving Private Ryan	Sergeant William Hill	Steven Spielberg		
1998	The Negotiator	Rudy Timmons	F. Gary Gray		
1998	Safe Men	Veal Chop	John Hamburg		
1999	Cradle Will Rock	Carlo	Tim Robbins		
1999	Man on the Moon	Bob Zmuda	Miloš Forman		
2000	Big Momma's House	John Maxwell	Raja Gosnell		
2000	Duets	Todd Woods	Bruce Paltrow		
2001	Storytelling	Toby Oxman	Todd Solondz	Segment: "Non-Fiction"	
2001	Planet of the Apes	Limbo	Tim Burton		
2002	Big Fat Liar	Marty Wolf	Shawn Levy		
2002	Thunderpants	Johnson J. Johnson	Pete Hewitt		
2003	American Splendor	Harvey Pekar	Shari Springer Berman & Robert Pulcini		
2003	Paycheck	Shorty	John Woo		
2003	Confidence	Gordo	James Foley		
2004	Sideways	Miles Raymond	Alexander Payne		
2005	Robots	Tim the Gate Guard	Chris Wedge	Voice	
2005	The Fan and the Flower	Narrator	Bill Plympton	Voice; short film	
2005	Cinderella Man	Joe Gould	Ron Howard		
2006	Asterix and the Vikings	Asterix	Stefan Fjeldmark & Jesper Møller	Voice	
2006	The Hawk Is Dying	George Gattling	Julian Goldberger		
2006	The Illusionist	Chief Inspector Uhl	Neil Burger		
2006	Lady in the Water	Cleveland Heep	M. Night Shyamalan		
2006	The Ant Bully	Stan Beals	John A. Davis	Voice	
2007	The Nanny Diaries	Mr. X	Shari Springer Berman & Robert Pulcini		
2007	Shoot 'Em Up	Karl Hertz	Michael Davis		
2007	Too Loud a Solitude	Hanta	Genevieve Anderson	Voice	
2007	Fred Claus	Nicholas "Nick" Claus	David Dobkin		
2008	Pretty Bird	Rick	Paul Schneider	Also producer	
2009	Duplicity	Richard "Dick" Garsik	Tony Gilroy		
2009	Cold Souls	Paul Giamatti	Sophie Barthes		
2009	The Haunted World of El Superbeasto	Dr. Satan/Steve Wachowski	Rob Zombie	Voice	
2009	The Last Station	Vladimir Chertkov	Michael Hoffman		
2010	Barney's Version	Barney Panofsky	Richard J. Lewis		
2011	Win Win	Mike Flaherty	Tom McCarthy		
2011	Ironclad	King John	Jonathan English		
2011	The Hangover Part II	Kingsley / Detective Peters	Todd Phillips		
2011	The Ides of March	Tom Duffy	George Clooney		
2012	Rock of Ages	Paul Gill	Adam Shankman		
2012	Cosmopolis	Benno Levin	David Cronenberg		
2012	John Dies at the End	Arnie Blondestone	Don Coscarelli	Also executive producer	
2013	Turbo	Chet	David Soren	Voice	
2013	The Congress	Dr. Baker	Ari Folman		
2013	Romeo & Juliet	Friar Laurence	Carlo Carlei		
2013	Parkland	Abraham Zapruder	Peter Landesman		
2013	12 Years a Slave	Theophilus Freeman	Steve McQueen		
2013	All Is Bright	Dennis	Phil Morrison	Also executive producer	
2013	Saving Mr. Banks	Ralph	John Lee Hancock		
2014	Ernest & Celestine	Rat Judge	Stéphane Aubier, Vincent Patar & Benjamin Renner	English dub	
2014	River of Fundament	Ptah-Nem-Hotep	Matthew Barney		
2014	The Amazing Spider-Man 2	Aleksei Sytsevich / Rhino	Marc Webb		
2014	Madame Bovary	Monsieur Homais	Sophie Barthes		
2014	Love & Mercy	Dr. Eugene Landy	Bill Pohlad		
2015	Giant Sloth	Gordon Boonewell	Paul Hornschemeier	Voice; short film	
2015	The Little Prince	The Academy Teacher	Mark Osborne	Voice	
2015	San Andreas	Dr. Lawrence Hayes	Brad Peyton		
2015	Straight Outta Compton	Jerry Heller	F. Gary Gray		
2016	Ratchet & Clank	Chairman Drek	Kevin Munroe	Voice	
2016	April and the Extraordinary World	Pizoni	Christian Desmares & Franck Ekinci	Voice	
2016	The Phenom	Dr. Mobley	Noah Buschel		
2016	Morgan	Dr. Alan Shapiro	Luke Scott		
2018	I Think We're Alone Now	Patrick	Reed Morano		
2018	Private Life	Richard Grimes	Tamara Jenkins		
2018	The Catcher Was a Spy	Samuel Goudsmit	Ben Lewin		
2018	White Fang	Beauty Smith	Alexandre Espigares	Voice	
2021	Gunpowder Milkshake	Nathan	Navot Papushado		
2021	Jungle Cruise	Nilo Nemolato	Jaume Collet-Serra		
2021	A Mouthful of Air	Dr. Sylvester	Amy Koppelman		
2023	The Holdovers	Paul Hunham	Alexander Payne		
2025	Downton Abbey: The Grand Finale	Harold Levinson	Simon Curtis		
2026	The Debut	Jerry Blankenbuehler	Jesse Eisenberg		
2026	A Statement	David H. Slade	Tom McCarthy		

== Television ==
Year	Title	Role	Notes	Refs.
1990	She'll Take Romance	Heckler #2	Television film	
1994	NYPD Blue	Man in Sleeping Bag	Episode: "You Bet Your Life"	
1995	New York News	Dr. Wargner	Episode: "Past Imperfect"	
1996	The Show	Jeffrey Roffman	Episode: "Pilot"	
1998	Homicide: Life on the Street	Harry Tjarks	Episode: "Pit Bull Sessions"	
1998	Tourist Trap	Jeremiah Piper	Television film	
1998	Winchell	Herman Kurfeld	Television film	
1999	American Experience	Narrator	Voice; episode: "New York: Part V - Cosmopolis"	
2000	If These Walls Could Talk 2	Ted Hedley	Television film	
2001	King of the Hill	Mr. McKay	Voice; episode: "It's Not Easy Being Green"	
2003	The Pentagon Papers	Anthony Russo	Television film	
2005	Saturday Night Live	Himself (host)	Episode: "Paul Giamatti/Ludacris featuring Sum-41"	
2006	The Amazing Screw-On Head	Screw-On Head	Voice; pilot	
2008	John Adams	John Adams	7 episodes	
2010	30 Rock	Ritchie	Episode: "When It Rains, It Pours"	
2011	Prohibition	Himself	Documentary	
2011	Too Big to Fail	Ben Bernanke	Television film	
2013	Downton Abbey	Harold Levinson	Episode: "The London Season"	
2014	The Roosevelts: An Intimate History	Theodore Roosevelt	Voice; documentary	
2014	Hoke	Hoke Mosely	Pilot; also executive producer	
2014–2015	Inside Amy Schumer	God / Juror #10	2 episodes	
2015	Breakthrough	Himself	Documentary; also director; episode: "More Than Human"	
2016–2023	Billions	Chuck Rhoades	84 episodes	
2016–2017	Outsiders	—N/a	Executive producer	
2017	BoJack Horseman	Himself as BoJack	Voice; episode: "The Old Sugarman Place"	
2017	At Home with Amy Sedaris	Mr. Ogilvy	Episode: "TGIF"	
2018	Nature	Narrator	Voice; episode: "Sex, Lies and Butterflies"	
2018–2019	Lodge 49	L. Marvin Metz	4 episodes; also executive producer	
2020–2022	Rick and Morty	Story Lord	Voice; 2 episodes	
2020	Big Mouth	Andrew's Shit	Voice; episode: "Poop Madness"	
2021	The Sons of Sam: A Descent Into Darkness	Maury Terry	Voice; 4 episodes	
2022	Benjamin Franklin	John Adams	Voice; documentary	
2023	Teenage Euthanasia	Vic	Voice; episode: "CARS 4"	
2023	30 Coins	Christian Barbrow	8 episodes	
2025	Black Mirror	Phillip Connarthy	Episode: "Eulogy"	
2025	The American Revolution	John Adams	Voice; docuseries	
2026	Star Trek: Starfleet Academy	Nus Braka	3 episodes ("Kids These Days", "Come, Let's Away", "Rubincon")	

== Theater ==
Year	Title	Role	Notes	Refs.
1988	The Legend of Oedipus	Theban Guard	Williamstown Theatre Festival, Massachusetts	
1988	The American Clock	Rudy	Williamstown Theatre Festival, Massachusetts	
1988	The Resistible Rise of Arturo Ui	Bowl	Williamstown Theatre Festival, Massachusetts	
1988	Tom Jones	Partridge	Williamstown Theatre Festival, Massachusetts	
1994	As You Like It	Jacques de Boys	Yale Repertory Theatre, New Haven	
1994	The Triumph of Love	Harlequin	La Jolla Playhouse, San Diego	
1994	Thérèse Raquin	Camille	La Jolla Playhouse, San Diego	
1994	Baby Anger	Man	Playwrights Horizons, Off-Broadway	
1995	Arcadia	Ezra Chater	Vivian Beaumont Theater, Broadway	
1995	Racing Demon	The Rev. Donald "Streaky" Bacon	Lincoln Center Theater, Broadway	
1996	The Blues are Running	Pyle/Boo/Johnny	New York City Center, Off-Broadway	
1997	The Three Sisters	Andrei Prozorov	Criterion Center Stage Right, Broadway	
1999	The Iceman Cometh	James Cameron	Brooks Atkinson Theatre, Broadway	
2002	The Resistible Rise of Arturo Ui	Ted Ragg/Prosecutor/Ignatius Dullfeet	Michael Schimmel Center for the Arts, Off-Broadway	
2013	Hamlet	Prince Hamlet	Yale Repertory Theatre, New Haven	
2026	Rhinoceros	Jean	American Repertory Theater, Cambridge, Massachusetts	

== Video games ==
Year	Title	Role	Notes	Refs.
1996	Ripper	Doctor Bud Cable		
2016	Ratchet & Clank	Chairman Drek	Voice (audio from film)	

== Audiobooks ==
Year	Title	Refs.
2006	A Scanner Darkly	
2008	The True Story of the 3 Little Pigs!	
2016	Skeleton Crew	
2019	Stay Sexy and Don't Get Murdered	
2025	Something Wicked This Way Comes	
