= New Jack City =

1991 film by Mario Van Peebles

- Theatrical release poster
- Directed by: Mario Van Peebles
- Screenplay by: Thomas Lee Wright; Barry Michael Cooper
- Story by: Thomas Lee Wright
- Produced by: Doug McHenry; George Jackson
- Starring: Wesley Snipes; Ice-T; Chris Rock; Mario Van Peebles; Judd Nelson
- Cinematography: Francis Kenny
- Edited by: Steven Kemper
- Music by: Michel Colombier
- Production companies: The Jackson/McHenry Company; Jacmac Films
- Distributed by: Warner Bros.
- Release dates: January 17, 1991 (Sundance); March 8, 1991 (United States)
- Running time: 100 minutes
- Country: United States
- Language: English
- Budget: $8 million
- Box office: $47.6 million (US)

New Jack City is a 1991 American neo-noir gangster film directed by Mario Van Peebles (in his feature film directorial debut) and written by Thomas Lee Wright and Barry Michael Cooper, based on a story by Wright. The film stars Wesley Snipes, Ice-T, Allen Payne, Chris Rock, Judd Nelson, Bill Cobbs, Bill Nunn, and Van Peebles. Its plot follows Nino Brown, a drug lord in New York City during the crack epidemic, and Scotty Appleton, a New York City Police Department (NYPD) detective who vows to end Nino's rise to power by going undercover to work for Nino's gang.

New Jack City premiered at the Sundance Film Festival on January 17, 1991, and was released in the United States by Warner Bros. on March 8, 1991.

== Plot ==
In the New York City neighborhood of Harlem, Nino Brown and his gang, the Cash Money Brothers (CMB), become the dominant drug ring once crack cocaine is introduced to the streets. His gang consists of Gerald "Gee Money" Wells, his best friend since childhood; enforcer and personal bodyguard Duh Duh Duh Man; gun moll Keisha; Nino's girlfriend, Selina Thomas; and her tech-savvy cousin, ex-bank teller Kareem Akbar.

Nino converts the Carter apartment complex into a drug house. Gee Money and Keisha kill rival Fat Smitty, and the CMB forces out the tenants and landlord. Meanwhile, Scotty Appleton, an undercover police detective working with the NYPD, attempts to make a deal with stick-up kid Pookie, who absconds with the money. Appleton chases and shoots Pookie in the leg, but he is released on bail. As the years pass, Nino's gang successfully run the streets of Harlem with absolute power.

When Stone, the leader of the CMB police operation, comes under pressure from NYPD Commissioner Fred R. Price, Appleton, currently on suspension for shooting Pookie, volunteers to infiltrate Nino's gang and is partnered with loose cannon Nick Peretti. Elsewhere, mobster and tax collector Frankie Needles attempts to get protection money from Nino, who refuses to pay. While Appleton and Peretti observe Nino and his gang handing out Thanksgiving turkeys to the poor, Appleton spots Pookie, now a crack addict, and soon gets him into rehab.

Later, Pookie offers to help bring down Nino. Against his better judgment and the disapproval of Stone and Peretti, Appleton recruits Pookie as an informant. When Pookie relapses, Gee Money realizes that Pookie is wired and wearing a hidden video surveillance camera in his belt buckle. Gee Money orders the Carter destroyed. The cops barricade the Carter and find Pookie's booby-trapped corpse; Peretti defuses the explosives seconds before it explodes. Nino angrily warns Gee Money against repeating such a costly mistake.

After Pookie's funeral, Appleton and Peretti, no longer needed by Stone, go undercover as drug dealers. After bribing Frankie, Appleton infiltrates the CMB, partly due to Gee Money's increasing ambition and drug use. Though Nino distrusts them, he agrees to do business. After relating an anecdote about his own violent initiation into a gang in 1974, Nino warns that he will kill both Appleton and Gee Money if any problems occur. Appleton gains Nino's trust when he reveals information about Gee Money's side deal and saves him from a gun-toting "Old Man" who had earlier appealed to police for help against Nino.

While Nino, Appleton, and the CMB attend a wedding, Peretti sneaks into Nino's mansion to collect evidence. Don Armeteo, Frankie's boss, sends mobsters to kill Nino, and a massive shootout erupts. When Nino uses a child as a shield, Appleton attempts to shoot Nino in the back; Keisha is killed. Later, Nino throws Selina out when she condemns his nature, before killing Don Armeteo and his crew single-handedly.

Stone, Appleton and Peretti arrange a sting operation to nab Nino. Kareem, aware of Appleton and Pookie's connection, exposes Appleton, and a shootout ensues. Peretti saves Appleton by killing the Duh Duh Duh Man, and Nino escapes. That night, Nino confronts and regretfully kills Gee Money. After the gang's collapse, Nino holes up in an apartment and continues his criminal empire solo. Appleton, Peretti, and the police assault the complex, where Appleton brutally beats Nino, revealing that it was his mother whom Nino killed in his gang initiation. Peretti dissuades Appleton from killing Nino, who is taken into custody.

At his trial, Nino pleads guilty to a lesser charge, claims to have been forced to help the gang due to threats, and identifies Kareem as the leader. He is sentenced to only a year in jail. As Nino speaks with reporters outside the courtroom, the Old Man confronts and fatally shoots him in the chest, causing Nino to fall over a balcony to his death. Appleton and Peretti leave satisfied as onlookers look down at Nino's corpse.

In the closing moments, an epilogue states that the crack epidemic is still ongoing and decisive action must be taken to stop real-life Nino Brown analogs.

== Cast ==
- Wesley Snipes as Nino Brown
- Ice-T as Det. Scotty Appleton
- Allen Payne as Gerald "Gee Money" Wells
- Chris Rock as Benny "Pookie" Robinson
- Judd Nelson as Det. Nick Peretti
- Mario Van Peebles as Det. Stone
- Michael Michele as Selina Thomas
- Bill Nunn as the "Duh Duh Duh Man"
- Russell Wong as Park
- Bill Cobbs as the "Old Man"
- Christopher Williams as Kareem Akbar
- Vanessa Estelle Williams as Keisha, a female gang member of the CMB.
- Tracy Camilla Johns as Uniqua, Gee Money's ex-girlfriend who falls for Nino.
- Anthony DeSando as Frankie Needles
- Nick Ashford as Reverend Oates
- Thalmus Rasulala as Commissioner Fred R. Price
- Phyllis Yvonne Stickney as Prosecuting Attorney Hawkins
- John Aprea as Don Armeteo
- Fab Five Freddy as the Master of Ceremonies
- Flavor Flav as a DJ
- Eek-A-Mouse as a drug-dealing Rastafarian
- Keith Sweat as singer at the wedding
- Vin Diesel as Bouncer

== Production ==
The film is based upon an original story and screenplay written by Thomas Lee Wright, who had worked as a story editor at The Walt Disney Company and Columbia Pictures before moving to creative executive at Paramount Pictures. According to Carl Hart, who corresponded with Wright following Hart's criticism of New Jack City, the screenplay was originally written as The Godfather: Part III, and featured a protagonist who sold heroin rather than cocaine. Wright wrote a treatment for Paramount on the idea, which they liked enough to have him try to do a first draft. Wright based his script to interviews he had with people from Little Italy in New York along with the story of Nicky Barnes, the black kingpin who had modeled his criminal organization in Harlem after the Mafia. Wright later wrote, directed and produced Eight Tray Gangster: The Making of a Crip, a documentary of gang life in South Central Los Angeles.

The screenplay was co-written by Barry Michael Cooper, a former investigative reporter with The Village Voice who would later write the screenplays for the 1994 dramatic films Above the Rim and Sugar Hill, the latter of which also starred Snipes. Cooper's rewrite was adapted from his December 1987 Village Voice cover story entitled "Kids Killing Kids: New Jack City Eats Its Young," about the drug war in Detroit. The account referred to the 20th anniversary of the 1967 riots in Detroit, and in its wake, the rise of crack cocaine gangs in the late 1980s, such as Young Boys Inc. and the Chambers Brothers. The original story received notice from Quincy Jones, who sought a meeting with Cooper. He was then tasked with re-writes on a screenplay that had been done about the life of Nicky Barnes.

Filming took place in New York City between April 16 and June 6, 1990.

== Reception ==
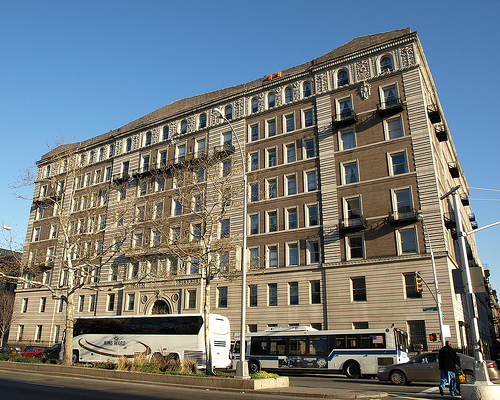
Harlem's real-life Graham Court, known in the film as the "Carter"

New Jack City was favorably received by film critics for its cast, storyline, and soundtrack. Roger Ebert of the Chicago Sun-Times gave the film three and a half stars out of four, writing:

Truffaut once said it was impossible to make an anti-war movie, because the war sequences would inevitably be exciting and get the audience involved on one side or the other. It is almost as difficult to make an anti-drug movie, since the lifestyle and money of the drug dealers looks like fun, at least until they're killed. This movie pulls off that tricky achievement. Nino, who looks at the dead body of Scarface and laughs, does not get the last laugh.

Time Out London described the film as "a superior example of what used to be called blaxploitation."

The film initially premiered at the Sundance Film Festival on January 17, 1991, before being released nationally on March 8, 1991. The film, produced with an estimated $8,000,000 budget, grossed $7,039,622 during its opening weekend. It became the highest-grossing independent film of 1991, grossing a total of $47,624,253 domestically. The film holds an 81% on Rotten Tomatoes based on 37 reviews, with an average rating of 6.7 out of 10. The site's consensus states: "Stylishly directed by Mario Van Peebles, New Jack City offsets its melodramatic streak with electrifying action and a cavalcade of effective performances." On Metacritic the film has a weighted average score of 61 out of 100, based on 13 critics, indicating "generally favorable reviews".

American Film Institute Lists

- AFI's 100 Years...100 Thrills – Nominated
- AFI's 10 Top 10 – Nominated Gangster Film

== Soundtrack ==
Year	Album	Peak chart positions		Certifications
Year	Album	U.S.	U.S. R&B	Certifications
1991	New Jack City: Released: March 5, 1991; Label: Giant Records	2	1	RIAA Platinum

== Home media ==
The film was released on DVD in Region 1 in the United States on August 25, 1998, and Region 2 in the United Kingdom on July 26, 1999, distributed by Warner Home Video. The film was re-released on DVD as a Two-Disc Special Edition in Region 1 in the United States on August 23, 2005, and Region 2 in the United Kingdom on January 23, 2006.

Special Edition DVD features:

1. Commentary by: director and co-star Mario Van Peebles
2. New Jack City: A Hip-Hop Classic
3. Harlem World: A Walk Inside
4. The Road to New Jack City
5. Original music videos: "New Jack Hustler" (Nino's Theme) by Ice-T, "I'm Dreamin'" by Christopher Williams, and "I Wanna Sex You Up" by Color Me Badd
6. Original theatrical trailer

The film was released on Blu-ray in the United States by Warner Home Video on August 14, 2012.

== Cultural influence ==
The New Orleans–based hip hop record label Cash Money Records is named after the Cash Money Brothers gang. Cash Money Records rapper Lil Wayne has a series of albums titled Tha Carter after The Carter Complex, and Lil Wayne and Tyga have referred to themselves as Young Nino. The film is the inspiration of the ring name for professional wrestler New Jack.

== Reboot ==
In 2019, Deadline announced that Warner Bros. Pictures was rebooting the film with Malcolm Mays writing.

== Stage play adaptation ==
In September 2022, film producer Je'Caryous Johnson announced the launching of the stage production adaptation of New Jack City: Live on Stage after his successful adaptation of another film, Set It Off: Live on Stage. The stage play stars Allen Payne, who reprises his role as "Gee Money", Treach as Nino Brown, Flex Alexander as "Pookie", Big Daddy Kane as Stone and Gary Dourdan as Scotty. The stage production's first preview ran October 29–30, 2022 at the Gas South Theater at Gas South Arena in Duluth, Georgia and then opened a nationwide tour from November 2022 and extended until the summer of 2023. The play returned by popular demand in January 2024 running in Houston, Texas with a final announced date set for Memphis, Tennessee June 2024. Omar Gooding was cast as Stone, while the latter three actors reprises their role from the tour.

The stage play is produced with special set design arrangements by Warner Bros. Theater Ventures.

== Other appearances ==
Chris Rock reprised his role as Pookie in an Easter-egg related cameo on Everybody Still Hates Chris.

== See also ==
- List of hood films
