= Young Boys =

Young Boys may refer to:

- BSC Young Boys, a Swiss football/sports club based in Bern
- Dalian Young Boy F.C., a Chinese football club based in Dalian, Liaoning
- FCM Young Boys Diekirch, a Luxembourg football club
- Young Boys FD, the professional branch of Silkeborg KFUM, a Danish association football club.
- Young Boys Inc., an African-American drug cartel
- A young boy, an adolescent or prepubescent male

== See also ==
- Adolescence
