= YBI =

YBI may refer to,

- Black Tickle Airport, the IATA code for the airport in Newfoundland and Labrador, Canada
- Yerba Buena Island, an island in San Francisco Bay
- Young Boys Inc., a drug cartel
- You Blew It!, an emo band from Orlando, Florida
