= Bill Cobbs =

American actor (1934–2024)

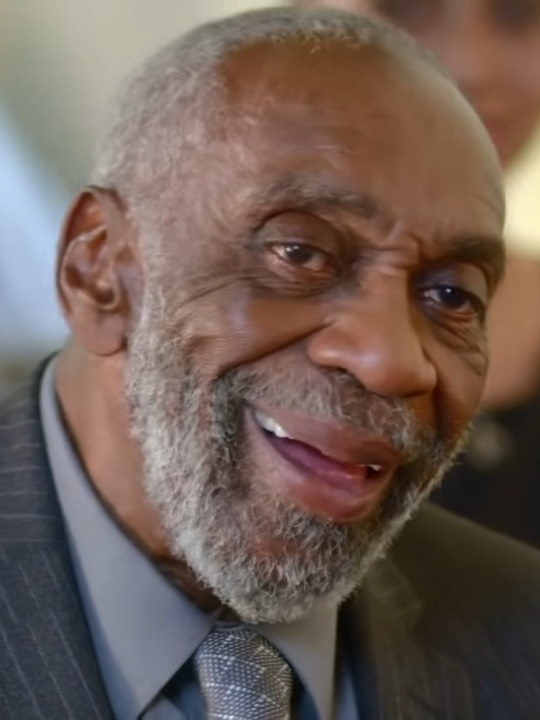
- Cobbs in Dear Secret Santa (2013)
- Born: Wilbert Francisco Cobbs; June 16, 1934; Cleveland, Ohio, U.S.
- Died: June 25, 2024 (aged 90); Upland, California, U.S.
- Resting place: Riverside National Cemetery
- Occupation: Actor
- Years active: 1974–2024
- Relatives: James Baskett (second cousin)

Wilbert Francisco Cobbs (June 16, 1934 – June 25, 2024) was an American actor, known for such film roles as Louisiana Slim in The Hitter (1979), Walter in The Brother from Another Planet (1984), Reginald in Night at the Museum (2006) and Master Tinker on Oz the Great and Powerful (2013). He also played Lewis Coleman on I'll Fly Away (1991–1993), Jack on The Michael Richards Show (2000), and had guest appearances on Walker, Texas Ranger and The Sopranos. In 2012, he had a reoccurring role as George in the sitcom, Go On. In 2020, he won a Daytime Emmy Award for Outstanding Limited Performance in a Daytime Program for the series Dino Dana.

== Early life ==
Cobbs was born on June 16, 1934, in Cleveland, Ohio, to a mother, Vera, who was a domestic worker and a father, David, who worked in construction. He had a brother named Thomas Cobbs. He was the second cousin of Song of the South actor James Baskett.

== Career ==
Cobbs served in the U.S. Air Force as a radar technician for eight years; he also worked in office products at IBM and sold cars in Cleveland, Ohio. In 1970, at the age of 36, he left for New York to seek work as an actor. He supported himself by driving a cab, repairing office equipment, selling toys, and performing odd jobs.

Cobbs credited Reuben Silver with his start in acting at the African American Performing Arts Center and Karamu House Theatre in Cleveland. His first professional acting role was in Ride a Black Horse at the Negro Ensemble Company. From there, he appeared in small theater productions, street theater, regional theater, and at the Eugene O'Neill Theatre.

As an amateur actor in the city's Karamu House Theater, Cobbs starred in the Ossie Davis play Purlie Victorious. Cobbs was in Vegetable Soup (1976), a New York public television educational series, and he made his feature film debut with a one-line role in The Taking of Pelham One Two Three in 1974. Cobbs had an extensive film career over the next several decades including the bartender in Trading Places (1983), the man in the lunchroom in Silkwood (1983), The Brother from Another Planet (1984), The Color of Money (1986), a doctor in Bird (1988), the old man who shoots Wesley Snipes in New Jack City (1991), the grandpa in The People Under the Stairs (1991), the singer's manager in The Bodyguard (1992), a police officer in Demolition Man (1993), the "clock man" in the Coen Brothers' The Hudsucker Proxy (1994), Medgar Evers's older brother Charles Evers in Rob Reiner's Ghosts of Mississippi (1996), fictional jazz pianist Del Paxton in Tom Hanks's That Thing You Do (1996), Basketball coach and retired basketball player Arthur Chaney in Disney's Air Bud (1997), Hope Floats (1998), the boat hand porter in I Still Know What You Did Last Summer (1998), a doctor in Sunshine State (2002), Enough (2002), and a blues musician in A Mighty Wind (2003).

He also appeared and was a regular on many television programs, including as Lewis Coleman on I'll Fly Away (1991–1993), James on The Gregory Hines Show (1997-1998), Jack on The Michael Richards Show (2000), and George, a blind grief-support-group member, on Go On (2012-2013). He also appeared on Good Times, Sesame Street, The Outer Limits; ER, Six Feet Under; The Others; JAG; The Drew Carey Show; Walker, Texas Ranger, The Sopranos, October Road; One Tree Hill; Star Trek: Enterprise (as Dr. Emory Erickson, inventor of the Transporter); a small role with Michael McKean in the Christopher Guest/Eugene Levy comedy, dog-show mockumentary "Best in Show" (2000); and many more.

In 2006, Cobbs played a supporting role in Night at the Museum as Reginald, a security guard on the verge of retirement. The character also served as an antagonist to the story. He played a priest in Get Low (2009). He also had brief appearances in the 2010 film The Search for Santa Paws, and the 2011 film The Muppets.

In 2014, Cobbs co-starred in Oz the Great and Powerful as the Master Tinker, and in late 2014 reprised his role of Reginald in Night at the Museum: Secret of the Tomb. He recorded a public service announcement for Deejay Ra's Hip-Hop Literacy2 campaign, encouraging reading of Ice-T's autobiography.

In 2020, he guest starred in the two-part series finale of Agents of S.H.I.E.L.D., portraying an unnamed elderly S.H.I.E.L.D. agent. Also in 2020, he won a Daytime Emmy Award for Outstanding Limited Performance in a Daytime Program for the series Dino Dana. His last credited appearance came in 2023, in the mini-series Incandescent Love.

== Death ==
Cobbs died from natural causes at his home in Upland, California, on June 25, 2024, at the age of 90. He never married and had no children.

== Filmography ==
=== Film ===
Bill Cobbs film credits
| Year | Title | Role | Notes |
|---|---|---|---|
| 1974 | The Taking of Pelham One Two Three | Man on Platform | |
| 1975 | A Boy and a Boa | Father | Short film |
| 1977 | Greased Lightning | Mr. Jones | |
| 1978 | A Hero Ain't Nothin' but a Sandwich | Bartender | |
| 1979 | The Hitter | Louisiana Slim | |
| 1983 | Trading Places | Terry the Bartender | |
| 1983 | Silkwood | Man in Lunchroom | |
| 1984 | The Brother from Another Planet | Walter | |
| 1984 | The Cotton Club | Big Joe Ison | |
| 1985 | Compromising Positions | Sgt. Williams | |
| 1986 | The Color of Money | Orvis | |
| 1987 | Five Corners | Man in Coffee Shop | |
| 1987 | Suspect | Judge Franklin | |
| 1988 | Dominick and Eugene | Jesse Johnson | |
| 1988 | Bird | Dr. Caulfield | |
| 1989 | The January Man | Detective Reilly | |
| 1989 | Picking Tribes | Voice-over | Short film |
| 1991 | New Jack City | Old Man | |
| 1991 | The Hard Way | Raggedy Man | |
| 1991 | The People Under the Stairs | Grandpa Booker | |
| 1992 | Roadside Prophets | Oscar | |
| 1992 | Exiled in America | Abraham White | |
| 1992 | The Bodyguard | Bill Devaney | |
| 1993 | Demolition Man | Zachery Lamb - Aged | |
| 1993 | Fatal Instinct | Man in Park | Uncredited |
| 1994 | The Hudsucker Proxy | Moses | |
| 1995 | Things to Do in Denver When You're Dead | Malt | |
| 1995 | Fluke | Bert | |
| 1995 | Man with a Gun | Henry Griggs | |
| 1995 | Tuesday Morning Ride | Jeff | Short film |
| 1995 | Goldilocks and the Three Bears | Caleb | |
| 1995 | Captiva Island | Vernon | |
| 1996 | Ed | Tipton | |
| 1996 | First Kid | Speet | |
| 1996 | That Thing You Do! | Del Paxton | |
| 1996 | Ghosts of Mississippi | Charles Evers | |
| 1997 | Soulmates | Mr. Williams | |
| 1997 | Air Bud | Coach Arthur Chaney | |
| 1998 | Paulie | Virgil the Janitor | |
| 1998 | Hope Floats | Nurse | |
| 1998 | I Still Know What You Did Last Summer | Estes | |
| 1999 | Random Hearts | Marvin | |
| 2002 | Sunshine State | Dr. Elton Lloyd | |
| 2002 | Enough | Jim Toller | |
| 2003 | A Mighty Wind | Blues Musician | |
| 2004 | The Mortuary | Franklin Harmon | |
| 2004 | Lost | Jeremy's Boss | |
| 2005 | Inner Demon | Arnold | Short film |
| 2005 | Squirrel Man | Morgan Wendell | Short film |
| 2005 | Return to Sender | Saul Burroughs | Short film |
| 2005 | Duck | Norman | |
| 2005 | The Derby Stallion | Houston Jones | |
| 2005 | The Final Patient | Dr. Daniel Green | |
| 2005 | Special Ed | Lou | |
| 2006 | Sent | Doctor | Short film |
| 2006 | Hard Luck | Cobb | Direct-to-video |
| 2006 | The Ultimate Gift | Mr. Theophilus Hamilton | |
| 2006 | Night at the Museum | Reginald | |
| 2006 | Sweet Deadly Dreams | Barney | |
| 2007 | Three Days to Vegas | Marvin Jeffries | |
| 2008 | Grim Abdication | Enforcer | Short film |
| 2008 | This Man's Life | Myer Truman | Short film |
| 2008 | The Dark Horse | Quincey | Short film |
| 2008 | The Morgue | George | Direct-to-video |
| 2009 | The Rebel Heart | Cephas Cordner | |
| 2009 | My Summer Friend | Walter | Short film |
| 2009 | Steadfast | John | Short film |
| 2009 | Get Low | Rev. Charlie Jackson | |
| 2009 | Black Water Transit | Frank Vermillion | |
| 2009 | Night at the Museum: Battle of the Smithsonian | Reginald | Deleted scene |
| 2010 | No Limit Kids: Much Ado About Middle School | Charlie | |
| 2010 | The Search for Santa Paws | Mr. Stewart | Direct-to-video |
| 2010 | The Tenant | Jack Rymer | |
| 2010 | Stroll | Clayton | Short film |
| 2011 | The Arcadian | Charles | |
| 2011 | The Muppets | Grandfather | |
| 2011 | Lilyhammer | Train driver | |
| 2012 | The Undershepherd | Dr. Ezekiel Cannon | |
| 2012 | Lukewarm | Thomas | |
| 2012 | Branch Line | Conductor | Short film |
| 2013 | Oz the Great and Powerful | Master Tinker | |
| 2013 | The Ultimate Life | Mr. Theophilus Hamilton | |
| 2013 | The Last Letter | Pastor | |
| 2013 | Vampires in Venice | Dr. Dooley | |
| 2014 | Tiffany at Breakfast | Him | Short film |
| 2014 | Of Mind and Music | Stompleg | |
| 2014 | Christmas in Palm Springs | Gabriel | |
| 2014 | Night at the Museum: Secret of the Tomb | Reginald | |
| 2014 | On Angel's Wings | Mr. Dupac | |
| 2015 | A House Is Not a Home | Paul | |
| 2015 | The Great Gilly Hopkins | Mr. Randolph | |
| 2016 | New Life | Mr. Charles | |
| 2017 | Beyond the Silence | Judge Johnson | |
| 2017 | Call Me King | Malachi | |
| 2017 | FuN? | Monte | Short film |
| 2017 | The Weight | Ezra Thomas | Short film |
| 2018 | As Evil Does | Jeremiah | |
| 2018 | Clipped Wings, They Do Fly | Judge Johnson | |
| 2019 | Beyond the Law | Swilley | |
| 2020 | Dino Dana: The Movie | Mr. Hendrickson | |
| 2021 | Saving Paradise | John Thompson | |
| 2022 | Block Party | Uncle Jim | |
| 2022 | Caroltyn | Dr. Mason | Last film prior to death |

=== Television ===
Bill Cobbs television credits
| Year | Title | Role | Notes |
|---|---|---|---|
| 1975 | First Ladies Diaries: Rachel Jackson | George | TV movie |
| 1976 | Good Times | George Gillard | Episode: "Evans Versus Davis" |
| 1977–1978 | Baby, I'm Back | Att. Adam Johnson | 2 episodes |
| 1978 | King | | Miniseries |
| 1982 | The Member of the Wedding | T.T. Williams | TV movie |
| 1983 | Rage of Angels | Abraham Wilson | Miniseries |
| 1985 | The Equalizer | Barry | Episode: "The Distant Fire" |
| 1985 | Sesame Street | Lee | Episode #17.30 |
| 1986 | Johnny Bull | Wiggins | TV movie |
| 1986 | Kate & Allie | Sam Butcher | 2 episodes |
| 1987 | Spenser: For Hire | Larry Sills | Episode: "If You Knew Sammy" |
| 1987–1988 | The Slap Maxwell Story | The Dutchman | Main cast |
| 1988 | L.A. Law | Webb Johnson | Episode: "Belle of the Bald" |
| 1989 | Homeroom | Phil Drexler | Main cast |
| 1990 | Designing Women | Henry / Charlie | Episode: "Papa Was a Rolling Stone" |
| 1990 | Married People | Willis | Episode: "Money Changes Everything" |
| 1990 | Gabriel's Fire | Walker Green | Episode: "I'm Nobody" |
| 1990 | The Trials of Rosie O'Neill | Fish Fry Baby | Episode: "Rosie Gets the Blues" |
| 1990 | Decoration Day | Gee Pennywell | TV movie |
| 1990 | Moe's World | | TV Pilot |
| 1991 | True Colors | Bernard Freeman | Episode: "Favorite Son" |
| 1991 | Carolina Skeletons | Elijah Crooks | TV movie |
| 1991–1993 | I'll Fly Away | Lewis Coleman | Main cast |
| 1993 | Coach | George | Episode: "Why So Happy, Hayden?" |
| 1993 | I'll Fly Away: Then and Now | Lewis Coleman | TV movie |
| 1994 | Empty Nest | Jerome | Episode: "Gesundeit" |
| 1994 | Northern Exposure | Angelo Maxwell | Episode: "The Letter" |
| 1995 | The Watcher | | Episode: "Reversal of Fortune" |
| 1995 | Kingfish: A Story of Huey P. Long | Pullman Porter | TV movie |
| 1995 | Divas | Sippy | TV movie |
| 1995 | Out There | Lyman Weeks | TV movie |
| 1996 | NYPD Blue | Norval Stevens | Episode: "The Nutty Confessor" |
| 1996 | ER | Mr. Bowman | Episode: "The Match Game" |
| 1996 | Nightjohn | Old Man | TV movie |
| 1996 | Thrill | Norm Duprey | TV movie |
| 1996 | Stories from the Edge | | TV movie; Segment: "Tuesday Morning Ride" |
| 1997 | The Outer Limits | Second Elder - Prisoner No. 91777 | Episode: "The Camp" |
| 1997 | Walker, Texas Ranger | Gino Costa | Episode: "Full Contact" |
| 1997 | The Wayans Bros. | Fred Watson | Episode: "The Black Widower" |
| 1997 | High Incident | Emmett | Episode: "Starting Over" |
| 1997–1998 | The Gregory Hines Show | James Stevenson | Main cast |
| 1998 | Always Outnumbered | Right Burke | TV movie |
| 1998 | The Wild Thornberrys | Chief (voice) | Episode: "Dinner with Darwin" |
| 1998 | L.A. Doctors | Bob | Episode: "What About Bob?" |
| 1998–1999 | For Your Love | Uncle Stanley | 2 episodes |
| 1999 | The Outer Limits | Joe Dell | Episode: "Fathers and Sons" |
| 2000 | The Sopranos | Reverend James, Sr. | Episode: "Do Not Resuscitate" |
| 2000 | The Practice | Arthur Turner | Episode: "Till Death Do Us Part" |
| 2000 | The Others | Elmer Greentree | Main cast |
| 2000 | For All Time | Proprietor / Conductor | TV movie |
| 2000 | The Michael Richards Show | Jack | Main cast |
| 2001 | The Fighting Fitzgeralds | Chet Armatrow | Episode: "The Fire Fight" |
| 2001 | Touched by an Angel | Henry Baldwin | Episode: "Band of Angels" |
| 2001 | Six Feet Under | Mr. Jones | Episode: "The Room" |
| 2001 | Rugrats | Uncle Charles (voice) | Episode: "A Rugrats Kwanzaa" |
| 2001 | Philly | Warren Bell | Episode: "Loving Sons" |
| 2001 | Bitter Winter | | TV movie |
| 2001–2003 | JAG | Chaplain Matthew Turner | 4 episodes |
| 2002 | The West Wing | Alan Tatum | Episode: "Enemies Foreign and Domestic" |
| 2002 | My Wife and Kids | Minister | 2 episodes |
| 2002–2004 | The Drew Carey Show | Tony | 9 episodes |
| 2003 | The Division | Mr. Greene | Episode: "Strangers" |
| 2003 | NYPD Blue | Bernie Carpenter | Episode: "Maybe Baby" |
| 2004 | Soul Food | Mr. Bradford | Episode: "Fear Eats the Soul" |
| 2005 | Star Trek: Enterprise | Dr. Emory Erickson | Episode: "Daedalus" |
| 2005 | Yes, Dear | Starter | Episode: "Greg's a Mooch" |
| 2005 | Yes, Dear | Counterman | Episode: "Barbecue" |
| 2007 | October Road | Mr. Bolivar | Episode: "Forever Until Now" |
| 2007 | Side Order of Life | Eddie Morgan | Episode: "Separation Anxiety" |
| 2008 | Players at the Poker Palace | Bill | Episode: "A Couple of Black Yankees" |
| 2008 | Army Wives | Harry | Episode: "The Messenger" |
| 2008 | One Tree Hill | Gus | Episode: "Touch Me I'm Going to Scream: Part I" |
| 2008 | CSI: Crime Scene Investigation | Harry Bastille | Episode: "Young Man with a Horn" |
| 2010 | The Glades | Gregory Richmond | Episode: "Honey" |
| 2011 | Criminal Minds: Suspect Behavior | Bishop Sanford | Episode: "Lonely Hearts" |
| 2011 | Harry's Law | Judge | Episode: "American Dreams" |
| 2012–2013 | Go On | George | Recurring |
| 2013 | Back in the Game | James | Episode: "Night Games" |
| 2013 | Dear Secret Santa | Ted | TV movie |
| 2014 | The Bay | Boyd Bloom | 1 episode |
| 2014 | Rake | Judge Rutchland | Recurring |
| 2015 | Hand of God | Papa Gene | 2 episodes |
| 2016 | The Ultimate Legacy | Mr. Theophilus Hamilton | TV movie |
| 2016 | The Mastermind 5 | The Mentor | TV Pilot |
| 2016–2017 | Greenleaf | Henry McCready | Recurring |
| 2017 | The Carmichael Show | Vernon | Episode: "Evelyn & Vernon" |
| 2017 | My Christmas Grandpa | Fred | TV Short |
| 2017 | Hannah Royce's Questionable Choices | Jack | TV Pilot |
| 2017–2019 | Dino Dana | Mr. Hendrickson | 6 episodes |
| 2018 | Superior Donuts | Luther "Wheels" Langdon | Episode: "Always Bet On Black" |
| 2020 | Agents of S.H.I.E.L.D. | Elderly S.H.I.E.L.D. Agent | Episode: "The End Is at Hand" |
| 2023 | Incandescent Love | Daddy D-Usher | Miniseries; final role |

== Awards and nominations ==
| Year | Association | Category | Work | Result |
|---|---|---|---|---|
| 2006 | Trenton Film Festival | Narrative Feature - Best Actor | The Final Patient | Won |
| 2019 | Daytime Emmy Awards | Outstanding Performer in a Children's, Family Viewing or Special Class Program | Dino Dana: Season 2 | Nominated |
| 2020 | Daytime Emmy Awards | Outstanding Limited Performance in Daytime Program | Dino Dana: Dino Flyer | Won |
