= Paul Giamatti =

American actor (born 1967)

- Giamatti in 2026
- Born: Paul Edward Valentine Giamatti; June 6, 1967 (age 59); New Haven, Connecticut, U.S.
- Education: Yale University (BA, MFA)
- Occupation: Actor
- Years active: 1988–present
- Works: List of performances
- Spouse: Elizabeth Cohen (m. 1997, divorced)
- Children: 1
- Father: Bart Giamatti
- Relatives: Marcus Giamatti (brother)
- Awards: Full list

Paul Edward Valentine Giamatti (/ˌdʒiːəˈmɑːti/ JEE-ə-MAH-tee; born June 6, 1967) is an American actor. Beginning as a varied character actor, his roles evolved into portraying everyman protagonists that balance sardonic humor and flawed humanity. Making his film debut in 1991, Giamatti's breakout film role was in Private Parts (1997), followed by supporting roles in Saving Private Ryan (1998), Man on the Moon (1999), Big Momma's House (2000), Storytelling (2001), and Planet of the Apes (2001).

He won acclaim for his lead roles in American Splendor (2003) and Sideways (2004), earning numerous accolades for both, including receiving a Golden Globe Award nomination for the latter. He would go on to earn Academy Award nominations for Best Supporting Actor for his portrayal of Joe Gould in the sports drama Cinderella Man (2005), and Best Actor for playing a disgruntled teacher in the coming-of-age dramedy The Holdovers (2023). He has also acted in The Illusionist (2006), Fred Claus (2007), Barney's Version (2010), Win Win (2011), The Ides of March (2011), 12 Years a Slave (2013), Saving Mr. Banks (2013), Love & Mercy (2014), Straight Outta Compton (2015), Private Life (2018), and The Debut (2026).

On television, Giamatti played the title role in the HBO miniseries John Adams (2008), which earned him acclaim and several awards including a Primetime Emmy and Golden Globe. He starred as U.S. Attorney Chuck Rhoades Jr. in the Showtime series Billions (2016–2023), and earned Emmy nominations for his roles as Ben Bernanke in the HBO film Too Big to Fail (2011) and Harold Levinson in the ITV series Downton Abbey (2013). He also played Nus Braka, a villain in the Paramount+ series Star Trek: Starfleet Academy (2026–present).

On stage, Giamatti made his Broadway debut portraying Ezra Chater in the Tom Stoppard play Arcadia (1995). He returned to Broadway acting in the David Hare play Racing Demon (1995), and revivals of Anton Chekhov's Three Sisters (1997) and Eugene O'Neill's The Iceman Cometh (1999), the later of which earned him a nomination for the Drama Desk Award for Outstanding Actor in a Play.

== Early life and education ==
Paul Edward Valentine Giamatti was born June 6, 1967, in New Haven, Connecticut, the youngest of three children. His father, Angelo Bartlett Giamatti, was a Yale University professor who later became president of the university and later commissioner of Major League Baseball. His mother, Toni Marilyn Giamatti (née Smith), was a homemaker and English teacher who taught at the Hopkins School and had also previously acted.

His paternal grandfather's family were Italian emigrants from Telese Terme, Campania; the family surname was originally spelled "Giammattei" (Italian pronunciation: [dʒammatˈtɛi]) before immigrating to the United States. His paternal grandmother had deep roots in New England, dating back to the colonial era. Giamatti's brother, Marcus, is also an actor, and his sister, Elena, was a jewelry designer.

Giamatti attended Choate Rosemary Hall until he graduated in 1985. Giamatti then attended Yale, where he was active in the undergraduate theater scene and worked with fellow actors and Yale students Ron Livingston and Edward Norton. He graduated in 1989 with a bachelor's degree in English, and performed in numerous theatrical productions, including on Broadway and a stint from 1989 to 1992 with Seattle's Annex Theater. Giamatti also briefly worked as an animator before returning to Yale and earning a Master of Fine Arts from the Yale School of Drama in 1994, where he studied with Earle R. Gister.

== Career ==
=== 1989–2002: Early roles ===
He made his television debut in the ABC made for television film She'll Take Romance (1990). After minor roles in the neo-noir Past Midnight (1991) and the romantic comedy Singles (1992) he acted in Woody Allen's comedy film Mighty Aphrodite (1995) and Sydney Pollack's romantic comedy remake Sabrina (1995). That same year in March, he made his Broadway debut in Tom Stoppard's Arcadia portraying Ezra Chater. Vincent Canby describe the role as being "a helplessly funny subsidiary" one. In November he portrayed The Rev. Donald Bacon in David Hare's Racing Demon. Both of these productions took place at the Lincoln Center Theater.

In 1997, Giamatti landed his first high-profile role as Kenny "Pig Vomit" Rushton in the film adaptation of Howard Stern's Private Parts. Stern praised Giamatti's performance often on his radio program, calling for him to be nominated for the Academy Award for Best Supporting Actor. Roger Ebert of the Chicago Sun-Times described Giamatti's performance as being "well played". That same year he reunited with Woody Allen, acting in the comedy Deconstructing Harry (1997). He also took a small but memorable role as Richard the Bellman in the Julia Roberts-led romantic comedy My Best Friend's Wedding (1997). That same year he returned to Broadway, playing Andrei Prozorov in the revival of Anton Chekov's Three Sisters.

In 1998, Giamatti appeared in Season 6, Episode 15 of Homicide: Life on the Street. He played Harry Tjarks, who raised pit bulls and was more concerned about his dogs than the fact that they had mauled his grandfather to death. He also appeared in a number of supporting roles in big-budget films including Peter Weir's drama The Truman Show, Steven Spielberg's World War II drama Saving Private Ryan, and the action thriller The Negotiator. In 1999, he played Bob Zmuda and Tony Clifton in Miloš Forman's Andy Kaufman biopic, Man on the Moon. Giamatti continued working steadily during the early 2000s by appearing in major studio releases including Duets (2000), Big Momma's House (2000), Planet of the Apes (2001) and Big Fat Liar (2002). Giamatti also played the lead role of Toby Oxman in Todd Solondz's 2001 independent film Storytelling during the "Non-Fiction" segment of the movie.

=== 2003–2015: Established actor ===
In 2003, Giamatti began to earn critical acclaim after his lead role in the film American Splendor. In 2004, Giamatti gained mainstream recognition and fame with the independent romantic comedy Sideways directed by Alexander Payne. His portrayal of a depressed writer vacationing in the Santa Barbara wine country garnered him a Golden Globe nomination and an Independent Spirit Award and he was named Best Actor in a Leading Role by several significant film critics groups (New York, Chicago, Toronto, San Francisco, Online Film Critics).

Following the commercial success of Sideways, Giamatti appeared in Cinderella Man, for which he earned an Academy Award nomination for Best Supporting Actor. He was nominated for a Golden Globe and won the Screen Actors Guild Award for Best Supporting Actor - Motion Picture. In 2006, Giamatti was the lead in M. Night Shyamalan's Lady in the Water, a supernatural thriller, followed by the animated film The Ant Bully, and Neil Burger's drama The Illusionist co-starring Edward Norton.

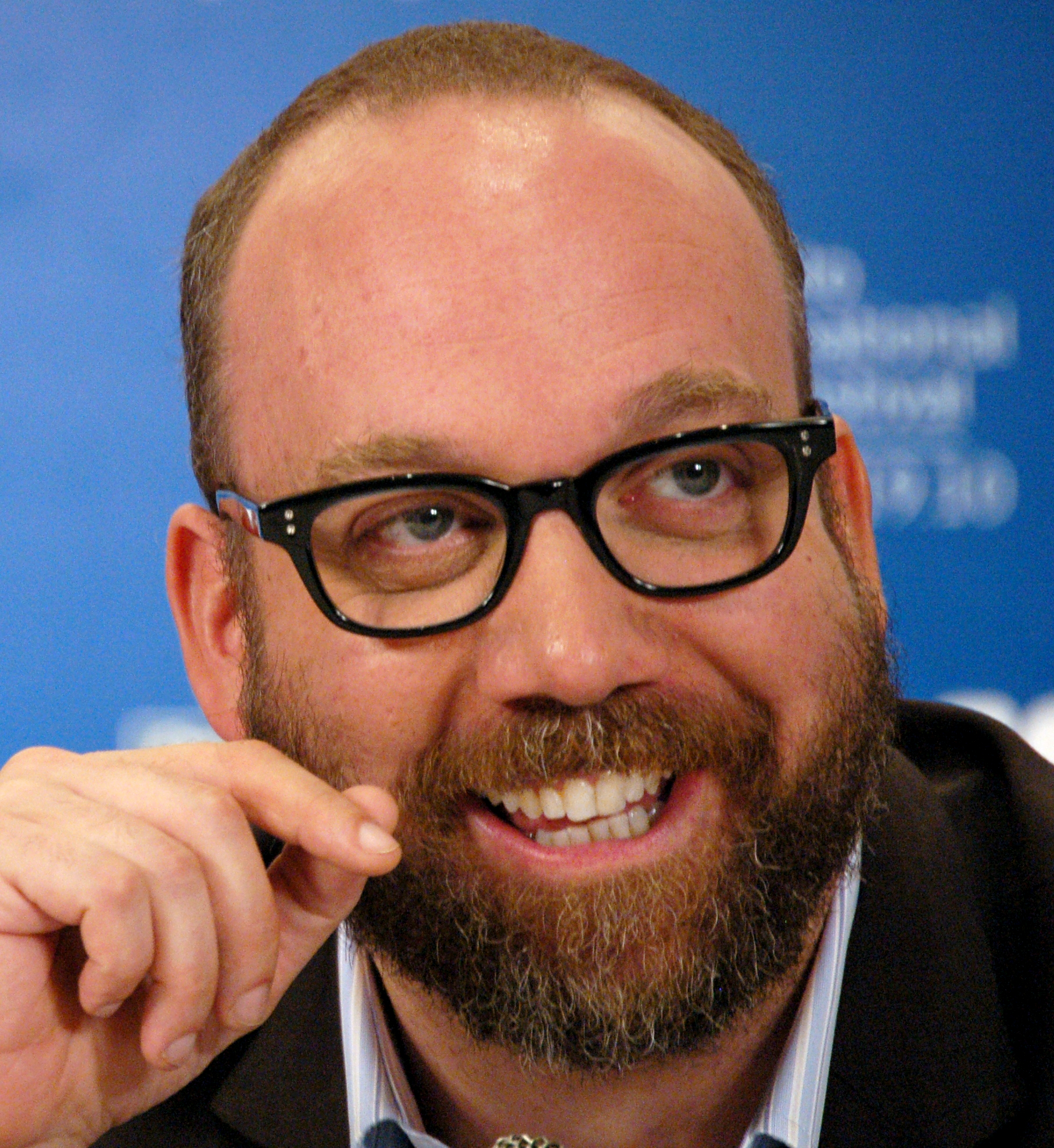
Giamatti in 2010

Giamatti had his first major role in an action movie in the 2007 film Shoot 'Em Up, while starring in The Nanny Diaries and Fred Claus. In 2008, Giamatti received an Emmy Award for Outstanding Lead Actor in a Miniseries or a Movie for his title performance in the 2008 HBO miniseries John Adams, as well as his first Golden Globe Award for Best Actor - Miniseries or Television Film and a Screen Actors Guild award. Barry Garron of The Hollywood Reporter praised his performance, writing "Giamatti is brilliant as Adams. He is fearless in his portrayal, confident that the character’s all-consuming sacrifices for his fledgling nation will more than compensate for his numerous character flaws". William Thomas of Empire agreed, adding "The acting, especially from Giamatti as the irascible Adams and Laura Linney as his wife Abigail, who steered him clear of vanity...has the tang of authenticity, even when burdened with great gulps of politicking". That same year, he starred in the independent film Pretty Bird, which is a fictionalized retelling about the drama behind the invention of a rocketbelt.

Giamatti received his second Golden Globe win for Best Actor in a Motion Picture - Musical or Comedy for his role in the 2010 film Barney's Version. The Associated Press praised Giamatti, describing it as "pitch perfect", adding, "the picture undoubtedly will draw kudos in its home and native land and likely beyond, buoyed by that virtuoso Giamatti performance". Giamatti starred as the lead in Tom McCarthy's comedy-drama film Win Win, which earned positive reviews from critics. Scott Tobias of NPR wrote of his performance, "By now, the Giamatti persona has been well-defined — exasperation and despair, tempered by mordant wit—but the actor's every performance is like a snowflake, and here McCarthy provides him a role that's subtly down-to-earth". The same year he had small roles in Ironclad, The Hangover Part II and The Ides of March.

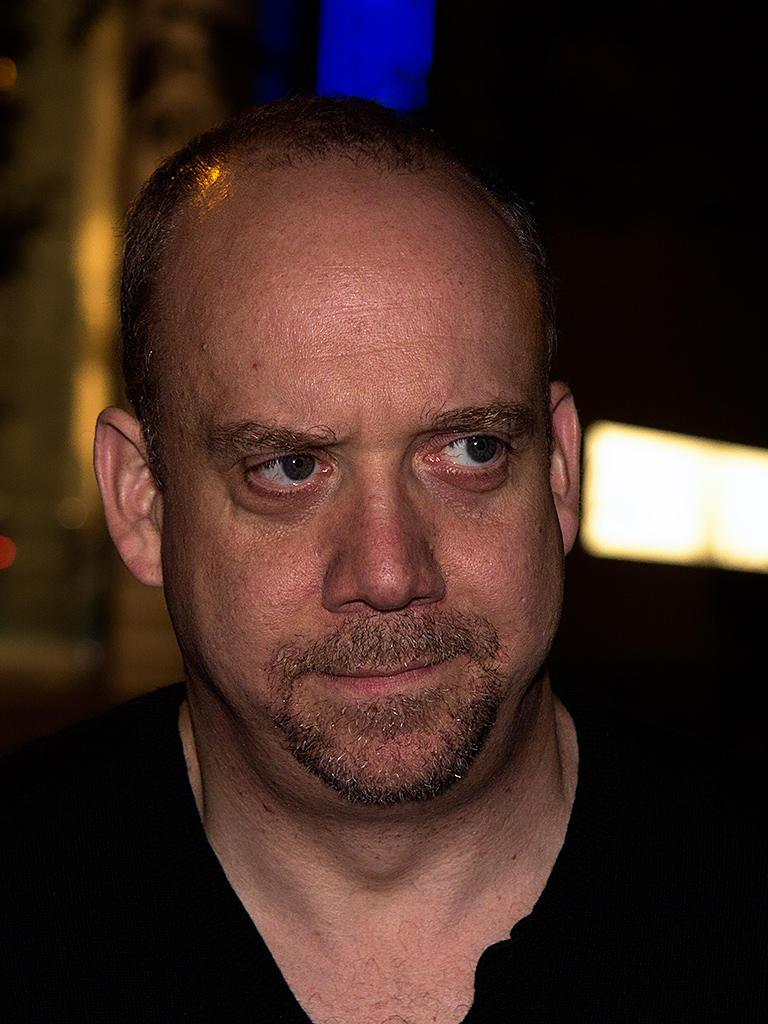
Giamatti in 2013

In 2012, Giamatti became the voiceover actor for Liberty Mutual insurance commercials. He was the narrator for the PBS Nature episode "An Original DUCKumentary". Giamatti produced and starred in John Dies at the End, which is based on the book of the same name. He also had roles in the films Rock of Ages and Cosmopolis.

In 2013, Giamatti returned to his alma mater, Yale University, to perform the title role in Shakespeare's Hamlet, for which he won rave reviews in a sold-out, modern dress stage production of the play at the Yale Repertory Theatre in New Haven. He also had supporting roles in several films, including the animated Turbo and The Congress, as well as Parkland, Saving Mr. Banks, and the critically acclaimed 12 Years a Slave. In addition, Giamatti played the role of New Yorker Harold Levinson, the brother of Cora, the Countess of Grantham (Elizabeth McGovern), in the 2013 Christmas special of the period drama, ITV Studios/Carnival Films television series, Downton Abbey. For his performance he received a Primetime Emmy Award for Outstanding Guest Actor in a Drama Series nomination.

In 2014, Giamatti played villain The Rhino in The Amazing Spider-Man 2. Also in 2014, Giamatti portrayed psychologist Eugene Landy in the Brian Wilson biopic Love & Mercy. In 2015, Giamatti portrayed N.W.A manager Jerry Heller in the biographical drama Straight Outta Compton. He also played a scientist in the disaster film San Andreas.

=== 2016–present ===
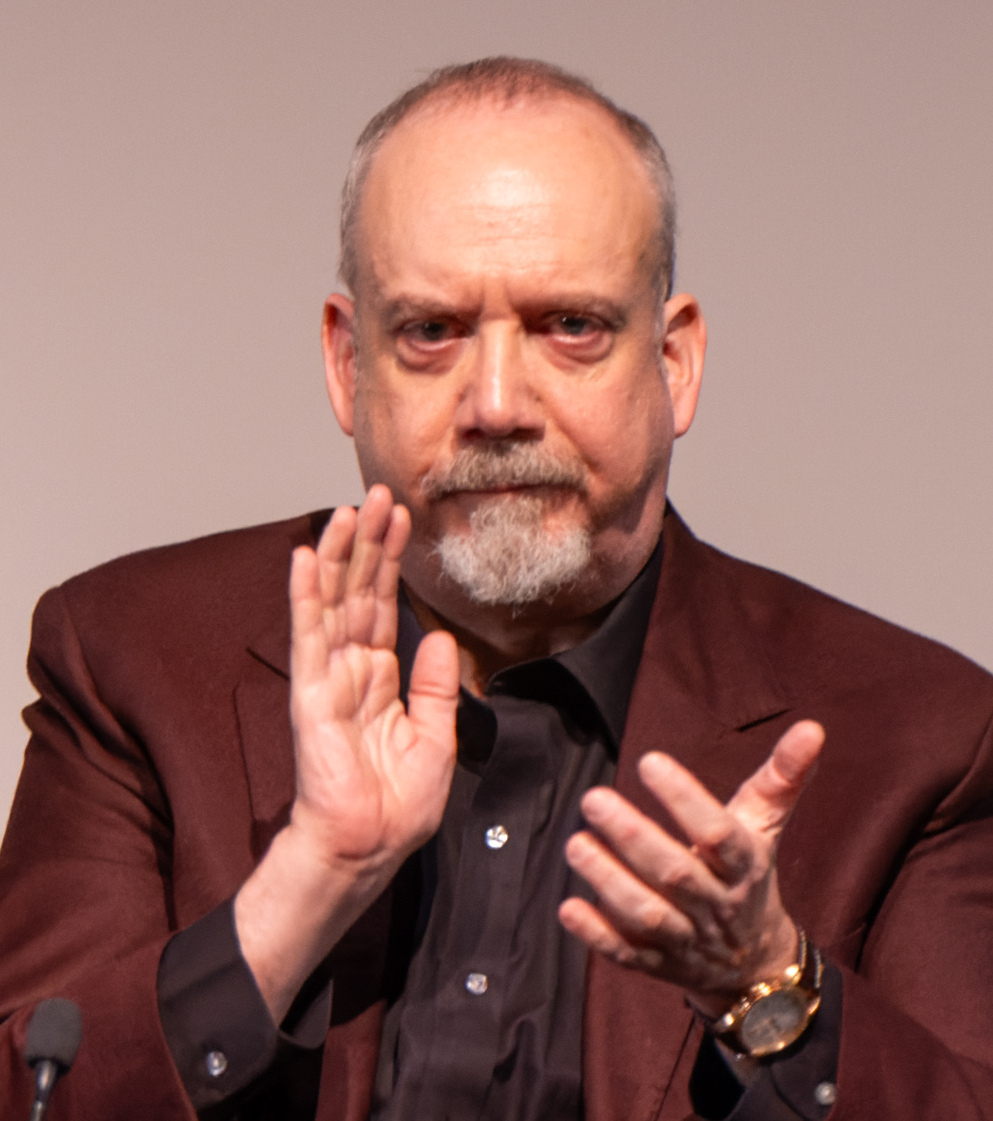
Giamatti in 2024

From 2016 to 2023, Giamatti played a lead role in the Showtime series Billions, portraying the U.S. Attorney for the Southern District of New York. The show, debuting in 2016, is inspired by real-life prosecutions of financial crime conducted by former United States Attorney for the Southern District of New York Preet Bharara. For the role he received a nomination for the Critics' Choice Television Award for Best Actor in a Drama Series. In 2016, Giamatti began appearing in commercials for Prism TV, the IPTV service owned by CenturyLink; the spots are the first-ever on-camera TV commercial appearances for Giamatti. In 2022, Giamatti appeared as Scrooge and Einstein in Verizon commercials. He served as an executive producer of the WGN America series Outsiders (2016–2017). He also lent his voice to BoJack Horseman, Rick and Morty and Big Mouth.

In 2018, he starred in the Tamara Jenkins-directed film Private Life, acting alongside Kathryn Hahn. The film, distributed by Netflix, received positive reviews. Alissa Wilkinson of Vox praised the performances of the two leads, writing "Hahn and Giamatti bring their characteristic warmth-with-an-edge to their characters, and as their relationship unpacks itself onscreen, it feels authentic and lived-in". That same year he acted in Reed Morano's post-apocalyptic romance drama I Think We're Alone Now and portrayed Samuel Goudsmit in the war film The Catcher Was a Spy. He returned to film in 2021, acting in the action thriller Gunpowder Milkshake and the family adventure film Jungle Cruise.

He reunited with Alexander Payne in the coming-of-age film The Holdovers (2023), which premiered at the Telluride Film Festival. The film, distributed by Focus Features, received positive reviews, with critics praising Giamatti's performance as a curmudgeonly teacher. Pete Hammond of Deadline Hollywood declared, "Giamatti, who so memorably starred in Payne’s 2004 Sideways, has never been better", adding "this is perfect casting for Giamatti." For his performance in The Holdovers, Giamatti received an Academy Award for Best Actor nomination and won the Golden Globe Award for Best Actor – Motion Picture Musical or Comedy and the Critics' Choice Movie Award for Best Actor.

Giamatti at the premiere for Downton Abbey: The Grand Finale (2025)

In 2023, Giamatti was awarded an honorary Doctor of Fine Arts degree from Yale.

In 2024, it was announced that Giamatti would star in a TV series based on the Hostel film series. In June 2024, he was cast in the recurring role of Nus Braka, the villain of the first season of Star Trek: Starfleet Academy. The show's execuitive producer Alex Kurtzman stated that he contacted Giamatti about joining the series after seeing Giamatti expressing love for the franchise during the promotion of The Holdovers, and that he provided Giamatti with the scripts of the first five episodes and a choice of multiple roles. Kurtzman was surprised by Giamatti's choice to play the villain, assuming that Giamatti would only want a one-episode role due to his busy schedule. Giamatti appeared in three episodes billed as a "special guest star".

In 2025, he reprised his role as Harold Levinson in Downton Abbey: The Grand Finale (2025). In 2026, he returned to the stage in a production of the Eugène Ionesco play Rhinoceros acting opposite John Turturro and Tatiana Maslany at the American Repertory Theater. Ty Burr of The Boston Globe praised his performance writing, "Giamatti is [the] outrageous scene-stealing star, delivering a master class in comic timing and hilarious bluster". That same year he starred as a imperious theatre director in Jesse Eisenberg's comedy The Debut (2026) acting opposite Julianne Moore.

== Wax Paul Now campaign ==
Giamatti is the subject of the viral "Wax Paul Now" campaign, which pushes for the actor to get a Madame Tussauds wax statue in his likeness. The movement first achieved national prominence when Giamatti appeared on The Late Show with Stephen Colbert and discussed the campaign with host Stephen Colbert. After this and subsequent articles in BuzzFeed and The A.V. Club among others, Madame Tussauds New York announced that they would host a party in Giamatti's honor to coincide with the premiere of Billions Season 3 on March 25, 2018, at which the founders of the Wax Paul Now movement would speak.

Tussauds announced that if a Change.org petition garnered 500,000 signatures in the nine days leading up to the party, they would agree to create the wax statue of Giamatti. As the petition was unable to garner enough signatures in time, the Wax Paul Now campaign is still ongoing. A short film chronicling the campaign premiered at the Virginia Film Festival in October 2019.

== Personal life ==
Giamatti resides in the Brooklyn Heights neighborhood of Brooklyn, New York and was married to Elizabeth Cohen from 1997 to an undisclosed date in the 2000s. They have a son. Though not religious, he stated: "My wife is Jewish. And I'm fine with my son being raised as a Jew". Giamatti is an atheist, although for him "religion features more now in my life than it did when I was a kid". In 2026, Giamatti said he has a new house in Connecticut.

== Acting credits and awards ==
Giamatti has received various accolades throughout his career. His breakthrough role in American Splendor (2003) won him the National Board of Review Award for Breakthrough Actor and earned him a nomination for the Independent Spirit Award for Best Male Lead. The following year, he received nominations for the Critics' Choice, Golden Globe and SAG Award for Best Actor for his role in the comedy-drama Sideways (2004), which won him the Independent Spirit Award for Best Male Lead as well as the Critics' Choice and SAG Award for Best Cast.

Giamatti then won the Critics' Choice and SAG Award and received nominations for the Academy Award and Golden Globe for Best Supporting Actor for his performance in Cinderella Man (2005). He won another two Screen Actors Guild Awards, for Outstanding Actor in a Miniseries or Movie for his roles in the miniseries John Adams (2008) and the television biopic Too Big to Fail (2011), the former of which also won him the Emmy and Golden Globe for Best Actor in a Miniseries or Television Film. His performances in Too Big to Fail, Downton Abbey and Inside Amy Schumer also earned him Emmy nominations, for Outstanding Supporting Actor in a Miniseries or Movie, Outstanding Guest Actor in a Drama Series and Outstanding Guest Actor in a Comedy Series, respectively. With these achievements, Giamatti is one of few actors to receive Emmy nominations across all three performance (lead, supporting and guest) and genre (comedy, drama and miniseries or movie) categories.

As a member of the ensemble casts of 12 Years a Slave (2013) and Straight Outta Compton (2015), Giamatti received nominations for both the Critics' Choice and SAG Award for Best Cast. His performance in the drama series Billions (2016–2023) earned him a nomination for the Critics' Choice Television Award for Best Actor in a Drama Series.

Giamatti won two Golden Globe Awards for Best Actor for his performances in Barney's Version (2010) and The Holdovers (2023). The latter also won him the Critics' Choice and earned him nominations for the Academy Award, BAFTA and SAG Award for Best Actor. He is among the group of actors to achieve Oscar nominations in both acting categories.

== See also ==
- List of atheists in film, radio, television and theater
