= Guy Boyd (actor) =

American character actor

- Born: April 15, 1943 (age 83); Du Quoin, Illinois, U.S.
- Occupation: Actor
- Years active: 1977–present
- Children: John Boyd (son)

Guy Boyd (born April 15, 1943) is an American actor, who has appeared in over 150 stage and screen productions since the late 1970s. He is best known to film audiences for his character roles. He won the Volpi Cup for Best Actor for his performance in Robert Altman's adaptation of David Rabe's play Streamers (1983), and was nominated for the Genie Award for Best Performance by a Foreign Actor for Ticket to Heaven (1981).

== Life and career ==
Boyd was born in Du Quoin, Illinois and raised there and in Chicago. He began his work as a stage actor in Off-Broadway and Broadway plays.

In 1983, he was honored at the Venice Film Festival with the Volpi Cup for Best Actor for his role in Robert Altman's adaptation of David Rabe's play Streamers (1983). He played Detective Jim McLean in Body Double (1984), and the pivotal role of Frank Hackman on two episodes of Miami Vice. He had the regular role of Captain Stickland on the 1990s superhero series Black Scorpion.

In recent years Boyd was seen playing Archbishop Kurtwell (a Catholic prelate accused of child sexual abuse) on the HBO drama The Young Pope. He also starred as Guy Canape in Past Midnight and the janitor in I’m Thinking of Ending Things.

== Personal life ==
Boyd was previously married to actress and dancer Sissy Boyd. They have two children together, including actor John Boyd.

== Filmography ==
- 1977 Between the Lines as Austin
- 1981 Ticket to Heaven as Eric
- 1981 Only When I Laugh as Man In Bar
- 1981 Ghost Story as Omar Norris
- 1983 The Eyes of the Amaryllis as George Reade
- 1983 Streamers as Rooney
- 1983 Eyes of Fire as Marion Dalton
- 1983 Blood Feud as Pete the Trucker
- 1984 Newhart (Episode: "Book Beat") as Colonel Lloyd Meninger
- 1984 Tank as Sergeant Wimofsky
- 1984 Flashpoint as Bobby Joe Lambasino
- 1984 Body Double as Jim McLean
- 1984 Caravan of Courage: An Ewok Adventure (TV movie) as Jeremitt Towani
- 1985 Jagged Edge as Matthew Barnes
- 1985 Target as Clay
- 1986 Lucas as Coach
- 1986 Moonlighting (TV series) as Alan Tupperman
- 1987 No Man's Land as "Jaws"
- 1986-1988 Miami Vice (TV series) as Frank Hackman
- 1988 War Party as Major Crawford, National Guard
- 1988 The Dark Side of the Sun as Father
- 1989 Little Sweetheart as Sheriff
- 1990 The Last of the Finest as R.J. Norringer
- 1990 Pacific Heights as Warning Cop
- 1991 Kiss Me a Killer as Jake Bozman
- 1991 Checkered Flag as J.D. Nelson
- 1991 Past Midnight as Todd Canipe
- 1991 The Dark Wind as Agent Johnson
- 1992 Sister Act as Detective Tate (uncredited)
- 1993 Mi Vida Loca as Priest
- 1994 In the Heat of Passion II: Unfaithful as Brannigan
- 1995 Carnosaur 2 as Joe Walker
- 1996 Sister Island as Sheriff Frank Bosarge
- 1997 Retroactive as Bud
- 1998 Crossfire as Mr. Ross
- 1999 Balloon Farm (TV movie) as The Mayor
- 1999 The West Wing as Dr Stanley Maxwell
- 2000-2005 Law & Order (TV series) as Elston Norrell / Mr. Beltran
- 2001 Black Scorpion (TV series) as Captain Henry Strickland
- 2005 Domino One as Jack Mekas
- 2005 Winter Passing as Hunter
- 2005 The Final Patient as Sheriff McKnee
- 2006 Walker Payne as "Doc"
- 2007 Blackbird as The Landlord
- 2007 The Savages as Bill Lachman
- 2010 Henry's Crime as Bernie
- 2014 Foxcatcher as Henry Beck
- 2014 While We're Young as Bar Patron
- 2016 Certain Women as Personal Injury Lawyer
- 2019 The Report as Senator Saxby Chambliss
- 2019 The Loudest Voice (TV mini-series) as Chet Collier
- 2020 I'm Thinking of Ending Things as The Janitor
- 2022 The Girl from Plainville (TV mini-series) as Dr. Peter Breggin
- 2021-24 American Rust (TV series) as Judge Glenn Parrone

== Awards and honors ==
- Nominated, 3rd Genie Awards, "Best Performance by a Foreign Actor", for Ticket to Heaven
- Won, 40th Venice International Film Festival, Volpi Cup for Best Actor, for Streamers
