= Booty Call (film) =

1997 film by Jeff Pollack

- Theatrical release poster
- Directed by: Jeff Pollack
- Written by: Bootsie; Takashi Bufford
- Produced by: John M. Eckert; John Morrissey; Karen King; Lawrence Turman
- Starring: Tommy Davidson; Jamie Foxx; Vivica A. Fox; Tamala Jones
- Cinematography: Ron Orieux
- Edited by: Christopher Greenbury
- Music by: Robert Folk
- Distributed by: Columbia Pictures
- Release date: February 26, 1997
- Running time: 79 minutes
- Country: United States
- Language: English
- Budget: $7 million
- Box office: $20.1 million

Booty Call is a 1997 American buddy comedy film directed by Jeff Pollack, and written by J. Stanford Parker (credited as Bootsie) and Takashi Bufford. The film stars Tommy Davidson, Jamie Foxx, Vivica A. Fox, and Tamala Jones.

== Plot ==
Rushon Askins has been dating his girlfriend Nikki for seven weeks. They like each other, but their relationship has not yet been consummated; Nikki is unsure if their relationship is ready for the next stage.

Rushon asks Nikki out to dinner, but Nikki wants it to be a double date. She brings her opinionated friend and neighbor Lysterine "Lysti", and Rushon comes with his "bad boy" buddy Bunz. Lysti and Bunz soon end up bonding as both are sexually adventurous and completely uninhibited, despite some initial bickering and resentment towards one another as each of them overplayed their roles by trying to come off as a player (Bunz) or overly high-maintenance (Lysti). Meanwhile, the more conservative and prudish Nikki decides it is time for her and Rushon to take their relationship to the next level, much to Rushon's surprise and excitement. However, they have one small problem: this is the 1990s, and Nikki wants to practice safe sex. Rushon produces a condom and just as he removes the wrapper, Nikki's mischievous, poorly trained, small terrier dog named "Killer" snatches and destroys Rushon's only condom, forcing him to have to go out and buy more condoms. Nikki then calls Lysterine and urges her to make Bunz (also condomless) use a condom as well. Therefore, Rushon (who has to take Killer along for his walk) and Bunz go on wild, late night adventures from store to store trying to find "protection" before everyone's mood evaporates. The two friends run across a wild assortment of characters which includes a Chinese medicine store owner, wacky Punjabi convenience store owners, a would-be armed robber, a hypocritical judge (Bernie Mac) and his female clerk/secret lover, and last but not least, a disobedient Killer who escapes his leash while Rushon and Bunz are in a store and leads them on a blocks-long chase.

Things soon lead to all four friends being at the hospital when Bunz accidentally shoots Rushon in the leg with a gun he took from a paranoid cabbie moments earlier. The group initially encounters a rude, unsympathetic admissions nurse who denies Rushon entry into the hospital because he has no insurance until Bunz runs across a doctor's credentials and impersonates the doctor to get his buddy admitted into the facility. However, "Doctor" Bunz is soon called in to help deliver a baby, which takes priority over a flesh wound, and he loses track of Rushon who is mistaken for a patient who is scheduled to be castrated (that patient shrewdly switched charts with Rushon upon finding out about his operation). The real doctor whom Bunz is impersonating eventually surfaces which leads the admissions nurse and security to search the hospital for the group. Bunz, Lysterine, and Nikki frantically search for Rushon who is soon anesthetized and prepared for castration. Nikki finds him right before the surgery begins and abruptly stops it by yelling that Rushon has no insurance. As both couples leave the hospital, everyone make up as both women take their men home for some long-delayed, kinky but safe sex.

== Cast ==
- Tommy Davidson as Rushon Askins
- Jamie Foxx as Bunz
- Vivica A. Fox as Lysterine
- Tamala Jones as Nikki
- Amy Monique Waddell as Arguing Woman
- Art Malik as Akmed (uncredited)
- Bernie Mac as Judge Peabody
- David Hemblen as Dr. Blade
- Amanda Tapping as Dr. Moore
- Gedde Watanabe as Chan (uncredited)
- Karen Robinson as Admitting Nurse
- Ric Young as Mr. Chiu
- Scott LaRose as Singh

== Production ==
The original script was heavily rewritten by director Jeff Pollack and Tommy Davidson. Prior to the film's release, it was noted that there were similarities with its condom plot to another film in development, Trojan War, which featured an all-white cast and which would also be released in 1997. Takashi Bufford said Booty Call was written entirely without knowledge of Trojan War's existence and said "Sometimes these things just bubble up from the zeitgeist."

== Reception ==
On Rotten Tomatoes it has a 31% rating based on reviews from 13 critics. Metacritic, which uses a weighted average, assigned the film a score of 54 out of 100, based on 14 critics, indicating "mixed or average" reviews.

Siskel and Ebert gave the film two thumbs up on a 1997 episode of their program. They praised the crude humor, comparing it to Beavis and Butt-head. Ebert in particular said the scenes involving Nikki's pet Jack Russell Terrier were "very, very funny." In his review, Stephen Holden of The New York Times observed "this contemporary sex farce, directed by Jeff Pollack, has the attention span of a hyperactive child." Leonard Klady of Variety labelled it "oddly effective", and said "a mixed bag of street humor, broad, bawdy jokes and hip-hop music, the film is very much on target to score a bull’s-eye with African-American auds."

A mixed review at the time came from Mike D'Angelo of Entertainment Weekly who gave it a C rating. D'Angelo wrote, "no, Booty Call has nothing to do with pirates and their ill-gotten gain. Then again, maybe there is: Two modern-day swashbucklers (Jamie Foxx and Tommy Davidson) yearn to plunder two willing maidens (Vivica A. Fox and Tamala Jones), but first they have to locate a couple of sheaths for their swords, if you know what I mean." D'Angelo went on to write, "most of the time, the amiable foursome is left ambling aimlessly from one so-so sketch concept to the next: four characters in search of a comedy." Bruce Walker of The Washington Post also had a mixed review, writing, "the name is enough to clue you in that this is not highbrow humor. In fact, it will appeal mostly to those who can appreciate basic juvenile humor." He added, "the movie seems more like a series of skits, some of which work and some of which don't."

In a 1997 interview with Charlie Rose, black actor and filmmaker Charles S. Dutton criticized young African-Americans who went to see Booty Call and Def Jam's How to Be a Player rather than the historical drama Rosewood, which was released around the same time. It was later referenced in a 1999 episode of The Simpsons titled Beyond Blunderdome, where a film executive character labels a fictitious director's cut of Booty Call as "fabulous".
