= Streamers (film) =

1983 film directed by Robert Altman

- Directed by: Robert Altman
- Written by: David Rabe
- Produced by: Robert Altman; Nick J. Mileti
- Starring: Matthew Modine; Michael Wright; Mitchell Lichtenstein; David Allen Grier
- Cinematography: Pierre Mignot
- Edited by: Norman Smith
- Distributed by: United Artists Classics (United States and Canada); Manson International (International)
- Release dates: 5 September 1983 (Venice); 14 October 1983 (United States)
- Running time: 118 minutes
- Country: United States
- Language: English
- Budget: $2 million
- Box office: $378,452

Streamers is a 1983 American war drama film directed and produced by Robert Altman, adapted by David Rabe from his play of the same name. It stars an ensemble cast, featuring David Alan Grier, Mitchell Lichtenstein, Matthew Modine, Michael Wright, George Dzundza, and Guy Boyd.

At the 40th Venice International Film Festival, the entire cast collectively won the Volpi Cup for Best Actor. Robert Altman was nominated for the Golden Lion. The film was screened out of competition at the 1983 Cannes Film Festival. It was released in the United States by United Artists Classics on October 14, 1983, and received positive reviews.

== Premise ==
In 1965, four young soldiers waiting to be shipped to Vietnam deal with racial tension and their own intolerance when one soldier reveals he is gay.

== Cast ==
- Matthew Modine as Billy
- Michael Wright as Carlyle
- Mitchell Lichtenstein as Richie
- David Alan Grier as Roger
- Guy Boyd as Rooney
- George Dzundza as Cokes
- Albert Macklin as Martin
- B. J. Cleveland as Pfc. Bush
- Bill Allen as Lt. Townsend
- Paul Lazar as MP Lieutenant
- Phil Ward as MP Sgt. Kilick
- Terry McIlvain as Orderly
- Todd Savell as MP Sgt. Savio
- Mark Fickert as Dr. Banes
- Dustye Winniford as Staff Sergeant

== Production ==
Altman financed the film himself without a distribution deal, which allowed him to cast an ensemble of experienced but relatively unknown actors rather than rely on a bankable star as studios typically demanded. The film was shot in Dallas in 18 days.

== Release ==
On June 27, 1983, Nick Mileti's International Distributors, Inc. acquired worldwide rights to Streamers for $3 million, following three months of negotiations. Despite Cinecom, with whom Altman had a three-picture deal, looking to acquire domestic rights, they ultimately went to United Artists Classics in September 1983. A week later, shortly before the film's premiere at Toronto, Manson International acquired "worldwide licensing rights" to the film.

Streamers premiered at the Toronto International Film Festival on September 16, 1983. The film was later released onto DVD by Shout! Factory on January 19, 2010.

== Reception ==
Roger Ebert gave the film four stars out of four, calling it "one of the most intense and intimate dramas I've ever seen on film," adding, "Watching this film is such a demanding experience that both times I've seen it, it has been too much for some viewers, and they've left. Those who stay, who survive the difficult passages of violence, will find at the end of the film a conclusion that is so poetic and moving it succeeds in placing the tragedy in perspective." Gene Siskel awarded three-and-a-half stars out of four and called it "a powerful piece of American theater made even more striking on screen," declaring that it also "represents the return of Altman the director, for here is a play one could hand to a dozen directors and you would not see a better, more personal work." Vincent Canby of The New York Times was less positive, writing that the film "goes partway toward realizing the full effect of a stage play as a film, then botches the job by the overabundant use of film techniques, which dismember what should be an ensemble performance." Sheila Benson of the Los Angeles Times called the film "a punishing place to be in, but a brilliant and thought-provoking movie experience." Jack Kroll of Newsweek wrote, "Altman sends his camera into the barracks like an invisible eavesdropper, appalled at what he sees but insisting on seeing it with punishing clarity. The nonstar cast is tremendous, especially Wright as the soldier who triggers a civil war within this troubled Army of a troubled society."
