= Above the Rim =

1994 film by Jeff Pollack

- Theatrical release poster
- Directed by: Jeff Pollack
- Screenplay by: Barry Michael Cooper; Jeff Pollack
- Story by: Jeff Pollack; Benny Medina
- Produced by: Jeff Pollack; Benny Medina
- Starring: Duane Martin; Leon; Tupac Shakur; Bernie Mac; Tonya Pinkins; Marlon Wayans
- Cinematography: Tom Priestley, Jr.
- Edited by: Michael Ripps; James Mitchell
- Music by: Marcus Miller
- Distributed by: New Line Cinema
- Release dates: March 22, 1994 (Los Angeles); March 23, 1994 (United States)
- Running time: 96 minutes
- Country: United States
- Language: English
- Budget: $6.5 million
- Box office: $16.2 million

Above the Rim is a 1994 American sports drama film co-written and directed by Jeff Pollack in his directorial debut. The screenplay was written by Pollack and Barry Michael Cooper, adapted from a story by Benny Medina.

The film stars Duane Martin, Tupac Shakur, Marlon Wayans, and Leon. Considered the conclusion to Cooper's "Harlem Trilogy" (the preceding films being New Jack City (1991) and Sugar Hill (1994), the film tells the story about a promising New York City high school basketball star, and his relationships with a drug dealer and a former basketball star, now employed as a security guard at the high school he was a promising young star for the past years.

The film was shot in Harlem, with various scenes filmed at the Manhattan Center for Science and Mathematics in East Harlem. Some of the basketball scenes were filmed at Samuel J. Tilden High School in Brooklyn, New York.

== Plot ==
Kyle-Lee Watson is a talented basketball player who is about to graduate from high school. While he waits to find out if he will receive a scholarship to Georgetown University, he finds himself in a difficult dilemma over a playground basketball tournament. He must decide whether to play for and follow his widely beloved basketball coach Mike Rollins or Birdie, a local drug dealer in the neighborhood. Thomas "Shep" Sheppard, a former standout player himself, now works as a high school security guard. Kyle's mother Mailika is falling in love with Shep, which is a source of resentment for Kyle; Kyle thus decides to run with Birdie's team.

Coincidentally, Kyle's coach also wants Shep to coach his team when he feels it is time for him to retire. It is later revealed to Kyle by Flip, a homeless crackhead and also Shep's old friend and teammate, that Shep is Birdie's older brother. The next night, Birdie humiliates Kyle's friend Bugaloo in front of his team; Bugaloo and Shep subsequently reveal to Kyle that Birdie had murdered Flip the night before. That same night, Shep challenges Kyle to a game of basketball, in which he gets the better of Kyle and ultimately wins, in an effort to teach Kyle a lesson about owing himself and the others who help and care for him. This, combined with Birdie's wrongful actions against Bugaloo and Flip, makes Kyle decide to return to his old team. In the tournament, both Kyle's and Birdie's teams advance to the finals, with Kyle's team playing solid team basketball, while Birdie's team plays a very rough and dirty style.

Before the finals, Birdie threatens Kyle, demanding that Kyle throw the game and allow Birdie's team to win. Kyle is brutalized throughout the game, with Birdie's team having a solid lead. Shep, unable to watch any longer, joins Kyle's team. Despite being aggressively attacked throughout, Shep helps the team come back. In the final seconds, he passes the ball to Kyle, who dunks to win the game.

After the loss, Birdie orders Motaw, his star player and gang member, to kill Kyle. Shep protects Kyle by jumping on him and Motaw shoots Shep. A plainclothes NYPD detective then fatally shoots Motaw twice. Bugaloo kills Birdie in the club, as revenge for previous humiliations and for trying to have Kyle killed. In the end, Kyle is revealed to have gotten the scholarship to Georgetown University while Mailika and Shep have started a relationship. During a televised game, Kyle hits the game winner, while a recovered Shep, Mailika and Coach Rollins watch with a smile.

== Cast ==
- Duane Martin as Kyle-Lee Watson, a talented basketball player who is determined to be accepted to Georgetown University, and play for their basketball team, the Hoyas. He is seen as "cocky and hot tempered" but later changes his ways during the course of the film.
- Leon as Thomas "Shep" Sheppard, a quiet, bitter introvert, who used to be an incredible high school basketball player. He was later arrested after his best friend, Nutso, accidentally jumps off a high rise building while playing basketball.
- Tupac Shakur as Birdie Sheppard, a local thug and Shep's younger brother.
- Bernie Mac as Flip, a homeless crackhead who played basketball in high school with Shep and Nutso. He is later killed by Birdie and Motaw.
- Tonya Pinkins as Mailika Watson, Kyle's mom who tries to get him to see that there is more to life than just basketball. She develops a relationship with Shep.
- Marlon Wayans as Bugaloo, Kyle's womanizing, funny best friend who spent a year in juvenile detention for an unknown crime. He is often bullied by Birdie and his gang members.
- David Bailey as Mike Rollins, a respected coach for Kyle's team, who tries to get Shep to play basketball again.
- Wood Harris as Motaw, Birdie's teenaged lieutenant and star player on his team. He is a homicidal psychopath who will threaten anyone with no second thought nor remorse.
- Shawn Michael Howard as Bobby, Kyle's shy and soft-spoken friend who plays in the basketball tournament.
- Henry Simmons II as Starnes, Kyle's teammate who is disgusted by Kyle's cockiness.
- Michael Rispoli as Richard "Big Richie" Jones
- James Williams as Speedy
- Bill Raftery as himself
- John Thompson as himself

== Soundtrack ==
Year	Album	Peak chart positions		Certifications
Year	Album	U.S.	U.S. R&B	Certifications
1994	Above the Rim: Released: March 22, 1994; Label: Death Row Records, Interscope	2	1	US: Double Platinum

== Production ==
Filming for Above the Rim took place from October to November 1993, beginning on October 18 in Harlem, New York City. Allen Payne declined the leading role, which went to Martin. This was Shakur’s final film to be released during his lifetime.

== Reception ==
=== Box office ===
The film was released on March 23, 1994, grossing $3,738,800 on opening weekend. At the end of its theatrical run, it had grossed a total of $16,192,320.

=== Awards ===
1995 MTV Movie Awards

- Best Movie Song: "Regulate" by Warren G (nominated)

=== Critical ===
It holds a 50% rating on Rotten Tomatoes, based on 22 reviews. Peter Travers stated "It's Shakur who steals the show. The rapper's offscreen legal problems are well known, but there's no denying his power as an actor." Variety said "A fine cast and the movie's general energy can't overcome that mix of cliches and technical flaws, which should conspire to prevent any high flying at the box office."

== See also ==
- Above the Rim (soundtrack)
- List of basketball films
- List of hood films
