= The Final Patient =

- Directed by: Jerry Mainardi
- Written by: Jerry Mainardi; Michael J. Mainardi
- Produced by: Michael J. Mainardi
- Starring: Bill Cobbs
- Cinematography: Joe Vandergast
- Edited by: Jeff Candelora; Jerry Mainardi; Michael J. Mainardi
- Music by: Ron Burns
- Production company: The Final Patient Productions LLC
- Distributed by: Echo Bridge Home Entertainment
- Release date: 2005
- Running time: 100 minutes
- Country: United States
- Language: English

The Final Patient is a 2005 American horror thriller film directed by Jerry Mainardi and starring Bill Cobbs.

== Cast ==
- Bill Cobbs as Dr. Daniel Green
- Alex Feldman as Cameron Streckman
- Jason Scott Campbell as Willy Jenkins
- Lizan Mitchell as Elizabeth Green
- Guy Boyd as Sheriff McKnee

== Reception ==
Christopher Null of Contactmusic.com awarded the film two and a half stars out of five.
