= List of awards and nominations received by Paul Giamatti =

Paul Giamatti awards and nominations
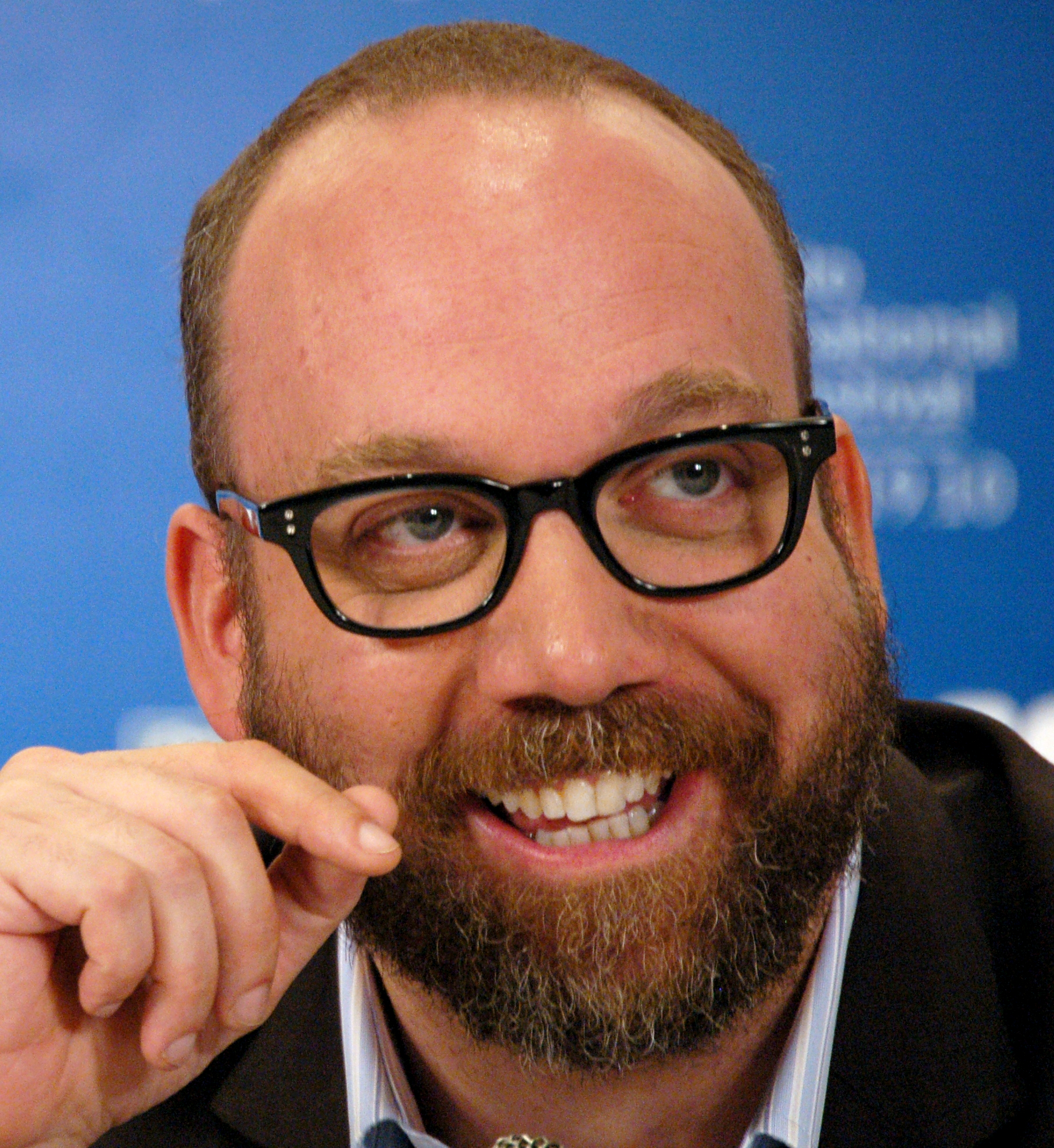
- Giamatti in 2010
Awards and nominations
Award	Wins	Nominations
Academy Awards	0	2
Actor Awards	4	8
BAFTA Awards	0	1
Critics' Choice Awards	3	10
Emmy Awards	1	4
Golden Globe Awards	3	6

Totals (Note: Certain award groups do not simply award one winner. They acknowledge several different recipients, have runners-up, and have third place. Since this is a specific recognition and is different from losing an award, runner-up mentions are considered wins in this award tally. For simplification and to avoid errors, each award in this list has been presumed to have had a prior nomination.)
- Wins: 68
- Nominations: 106

Paul Giamatti is an American actor and producer. He has received various accolades including a Primetime Emmy Award, three Golden Globe Awards and four Actor Awards as well as nominations for two Academy Awards and a British Academy Film Award.

Giamatti received his first Academy Award nomination for Best Supporting Actor for his portrayal of boxing manager Joe Gould in Ron Howard's sports drama Cinderella Man (2005). The role also earned him the Actor Award for Outstanding Performance by a Male Actor in a Supporting Role as well as nominations for a Golden Globe Award for Best Supporting Actor – Motion Picture and a Critics' Choice Movie Award for Best Supporting Actor. For his role as a depressed teacher on a road trip to a winery in the Alexander Payne dramedy Sideways (2004) he was nominated for the Golden Globe Award for Best Actor in a Motion Picture – Musical or Comedy and the Actor Award for Outstanding Performance by a Male Actor in a Leading Role. For his leading role as an uptight boarding school teacher in Alexander Payne's holiday dramedy The Holdovers (2023) he was nominated for the Academy Award for Best Actor and the BAFTA Award for Best Actor in a Leading Role and also won the Golden Globe Award for Best Actor in a Motion Picture – Musical or Comedy and the Critics' Choice Movie Award for Best Actor.

On television, he gained acclaim for his portrayal of title role in the HBO historical drama miniseries John Adams (2008) which earned him the Primetime Emmy Award for Outstanding Lead Actor in a Limited or Anthology Series or Movie, the Golden Globe Award for Best Actor – Miniseries or Television Film, and the Actor Award for Outstanding Actor in a Miniseries or Television Movie. He was further Emmy-nominated for his roles as Ben Bernanke in the HBO biographical drama film Too Big to Fail (2011), Harold Levinson in the PBS historical drama series Downton Abbey (2013), and a Juror in the Comedy Central sketch series Inside Amy Schumer (2015). For his performance as Charles "Chuck" Rhoades, Jr. in the Showtime drama series Billions (2016–2023), he was nominated for the Critics' Choice Television Award for Best Actor in a Drama Series.

== Major associations ==
=== Academy Awards ===
Year	Category	Nominated work	Result	Ref.
2006	Best Supporting Actor	Cinderella Man	Nominated	
2024	Best Actor	The Holdovers	Nominated	

=== Actor Awards ===
Year	Category	Nominated work	Result	Ref.
2005	Outstanding Cast in a Motion Picture	Sideways	Won	
2005	Outstanding Male Actor in a Leading Role	Sideways	Nominated	
2006	Outstanding Male Actor in a Supporting Role	Cinderella Man	Won	
2009	Outstanding Male Actor in a Miniseries or Television Movie	John Adams	Won	
2012	Outstanding Male Actor in a Miniseries or Television Movie	Too Big to Fail	Won	
2014	Outstanding Cast in a Motion Picture	12 Years a Slave	Nominated	
2016	Outstanding Cast in a Motion Picture	Straight Outta Compton	Nominated	
2024	Outstanding Male Actor in a Leading Role	The Holdovers	Nominated	

=== BAFTA Awards ===
Year	Category	Nominated work	Result	Ref.
British Academy Film Awards
2024	Best Actor in a Leading Role	The Holdovers	Nominated	

=== Critics' Choice Awards ===
Year	Category	Nominated work	Result	Ref.
Critics' Choice Movie Awards
2005	Best Acting Ensemble	Sideways	Won	
2005	Best Actor	Sideways	Nominated	
2006	Best Supporting Actor	Cinderella Man	Won	
2012	Best Acting Ensemble	The Ides of March	Nominated	
2014	Best Acting Ensemble	12 Years a Slave	Nominated	
2015	Best Acting Ensemble	Straight Outta Compton	Nominated	
2024	Best Acting Ensemble	The Holdovers	Nominated	
2024	Best Actor	The Holdovers	Won	
Critics' Choice Television Awards
2018	Best Actor in a Drama Series	Billions	Nominated	
Critics' Choice Super Awards
2026	Best Villain in a Series	Star Trek: Starfleet Academy	Nominated	

=== Emmy Awards ===
Year	Category	Nominated work	Result	Ref.
Primetime Emmy Awards
2008	Outstanding Lead Actor in a Miniseries or Movie	John Adams	Won	
2011	Outstanding Supporting Actor in a Miniseries or Movie	Too Big to Fail	Nominated	
2013	Outstanding Guest Actor in a Drama Series	Downton Abbey ("The London Season")	Nominated	
2015	Outstanding Guest Actor in a Comedy Series	Inside Amy Schumer ("12 Angry Men Inside Amy Schumer")	Nominated	

=== Golden Globe Award ===
Year	Category	Nominated work	Result	Ref.
2005	Best Actor in a Motion Picture – Musical or Comedy	Sideways	Nominated	
2006	Best Supporting Actor – Motion Picture	Cinderella Man	Nominated	
2009	Best Actor – Miniseries or TV Movie	John Adams	Won	
2011	Best Actor in a Motion Picture – Musical or Comedy	Barney's Version	Won	
2012	Best Supporting Actor – Television	Too Big to Fail	Nominated	
2024	Best Actor in a Motion Picture – Musical or Comedy	The Holdovers	Won	

== Miscellaneous awards ==
Year	Category	Nominated work	Result	Ref.
2003	National Board of Review Award for Best Breakthrough Performance – Actor	American Splendor	Won	
2003	Chicago Film Critics Association Award for Best Actor	American Splendor	Nominated	
2003	Dallas–Fort Worth Film Critics Association Award for Best Actor	American Splendor	Nominated	
2003	Independent Spirit Award for Best Male Lead	American Splendor	Nominated	
2003	Online Film Critics Society Award for Best Actor	American Splendor	Nominated	
2003	Satellite Award for Best Actor in a Motion Picture – Musical or Comedy	American Splendor	Nominated	
2004	Boston Society of Film Critics Award for Best Cast	Sideways	Won	
2004	Chicago Film Critics Association Award for Best Actor	Sideways	Won	
2004	Comedy Film Honor for Best Actor	Sideways	Won	
2004	Dallas–Fort Worth Film Critics Association Award for Best Actor	Sideways	Won	
2004	Independent Spirit Award for Best Male Lead	Sideways	Won	
2004	New York Film Critics Circle Award for Best Actor	Sideways	Won	
2004	Online Film Critics Society Award for Best Actor	Sideways	Won	
2004	San Francisco Film Critics Circle Award for Best Actor	Sideways	Won	
2004	Toronto Film Critics Association Award for Best Actor	Sideways	Won	
2004	London Film Critics' Circle Award for Actor of the Year	Sideways	Nominated	
2004	Satellite Award for Best Actor in a Motion Picture – Musical or Comedy	Sideways	Nominated	
2005	Boston Society of Film Critics Award for Best Supporting Actor	Cinderella Man	Won	
2005	Florida Film Critics Circle Award for Best Supporting Actor	Cinderella Man	Won	
2005	Toronto Film Critics Association Award for Best Supporting Actor	Cinderella Man	Won	
2005	Washington D.C. Area Film Critics Association Award for Best Supporting Actor	Cinderella Man	Won	
2005	Chicago Film Critics Association Award for Best Supporting Actor	Cinderella Man	Nominated	
2008	Golden Nymph Award for Outstanding Actor – Mini Series	John Adams	Won	
2008	Satellite Award for Best Actor – Miniseries or Television Film	John Adams	Won	
2008	TCA Award for Individual Achievement in Drama	John Adams	Won	
2009	Karlovy Vary International Film Festival Award for Best Actor	Cold Soul	Won	
2009	Gotham Independent Film Award for Best Ensemble Performance	Cold Soul	Nominated	
2010	Best Performance by an Actor in a Leading Role	Barney's Version	Won	
2013	Annie Award for Voice Acting in a Feature Production	Turbo	Nominated	
2013	Black Reel Award for Best Ensemble	12 Years a Slave	Won	
2013	San Diego Film Critics Society Award for Best Performance by an Ensemble	12 Years a Slave	Nominated	
2013	Washington D.C. Area Film Critics Association Award for Best Ensemble	12 Years a Slave	Nominated	
2023	Boston Society of Film Critics Award for Best Actor	The Holdovers	Won	
2023	Chicago Film Critics Association Award for Best Actor	The Holdovers	Won	
2023	Dallas–Fort Worth Film Critics Association Award for Best Actor	The Holdovers	Runner-up	
2023	Florida Film Critics Circle Award for Best Actor	The Holdovers	Nominated	
2023	National Board of Review Award for Best Actor	The Holdovers	Won	
2023	San Diego Film Critics Society Award for Best Actor	The Holdovers	Runner-up	
2023	Satellite Award for Best Actor in a Motion Picture – Musical or Comedy	The Holdovers	Won	
2023	St. Louis Gateway Film Critics Association Award for Best Actor	The Holdovers	Runner-up	
2023	Toronto Film Critics Association Award for Best Actor	The Holdovers	Runner-up	
2023	Washington D.C. Area Film Critics Association Award for Best Actor	The Holdovers	Nominated	
2024	Palm Springs International Film Festival– Icon Award	The Holdovers	Honored	
2024	Santa Barbara International Film Festival	Cinema Vanguard Award (Note: For making a significant and unique contribution to film)	Honored	
