= Sugar Hill (1994 film) =

1994 film by Leon Ichaso

- Theatrical release poster
- Directed by: Leon Ichaso
- Written by: Barry Michael Cooper
- Produced by: Rudy Langlais; Greg Brown
- Starring: Wesley Snipes; Michael Wright; Theresa Randle; Clarence Williams III; Abe Vigoda; Ernie Hudson
- Cinematography: Bojan Bazelli
- Edited by: Gary Karr
- Music by: Terence Blanchard
- Production company: Beacon Communications
- Distributed by: 20th Century Fox (United States and Canada); J&M Entertainment (International)
- Release date: February 25, 1994
- Running time: 123 minutes
- Language: English
- Budget: $10 million
- Box office: $18.3 million

Sugar Hill is a 1994 American crime drama film directed by Leon Ichaso and written by Barry Michael Cooper. It stars Wesley Snipes and Michael Wright as brothers Roemello and Raynathan Skuggs. Considered the second film of Cooper's "Harlem Trilogy" (after New Jack City and before Above the Rim, released a month prior), it focuses on the two brothers who are major drug dealers in the New York City neighborhood of Harlem, specifically the namesake Sugar Hill.

== Plot ==
Through the course of the film, several flashbacks are shown involving the Skuggs brothers, including (in the beginning of the film) the drug-overdose death of their mother Ella, the non-fatal shooting of their drug-addicted musician father, Arthur Romello "A.R." Skuggs (ultimately at the hands of the man they would later work for—Gus Molino), and a scene where Roemello is offered a full scholarship to Georgetown.

Roemello as a teenager avenges his father's shooting by shooting and killing Sal Marconi, Gus's cousin. After contemplating for a while, Roemello decides to quit dealing and start a new life with his girlfriend, Melissa, to the disdain of Raynathan, who is scared and hesitant to leave the drug game. However, Roemello learns that getting out is nowhere near as easy as getting in.

A series of events lead up to Roemello's eventual departure from the drug game, such as the death of his best friend, Ricky Goggles at the hands of an up-and-coming Brooklyn drug dealer and former boxing champion, Lolly Jonas. The Skuggs brothers and their associates find Ricky's burned body hanging from the side of a neighborhood apartment building. They later go after and then kill Tony Adamo, one of the other men responsible for Ricky Goggles’ death. Because of this, an eventual street war starts off between The Skuggs crew and Lolly's organization.

Melissa becomes more hesitant of being involved with Roemello, because of his lifestyle. After learning of the death of an aspiring teenage “stick-up kid”, Kymie in Roemello's neighborhood (Kymie, in fact, saves Roemello's life in a drive-by shooting by Lolly's people), she decides to break off with Roemello and would have one date with basketball star, Mark Doby.

The date starts off fine as Mark takes Melissa back to his house but he becomes drunk, physically and verbally abuses Melissa and nearly rapes her by forcing her to perform oral sex. She barely escapes by punching Mark in the groin and running out the door. As she returns home, she is shamed by her mother for being a “tramp”. She finally returns to Roemello and they begin to make plans to leave New York City.

Before Roemello and Melissa depart for North Carolina, they stop by to visit A.R. However, upon arriving at A.R.’s apartment, they find him dead of a drug overdose. Raynathan gave A.R. the heroin that would eventually kill him, with Raynathan’s reasoning being that he wanted “put him out of his misery”. Raynathan is found across the street, coming out of Gus’ restaurant, where he gunned down Gus, Lolly, and Harry, Gus's son.

Roemello tells Raynathan what happened to A.R., but Raynathan accepts responsibility of their father's death. After seeing Melissa waiting for Roemello, Raynathan fires his gun at her, and the brothers proceed to fight each other and Raynathan accidentally shoots Roemello. Realizing this, Raynathan panics and fatally shoots himself in the stomach.

Roemello and Melissa, sometime later, do move to North Carolina, where they have a young son, but Roemello is found in a wheelchair, likely paralyzed from the waist down (though the extent of the paralysis is not fully explained), however he is enjoying family life.

== Cast ==
- Wesley Snipes as Roemello "Rome" Skuggs
  - Dulé Hill as Roemello (aged 17)
  - Marquise Wilson as Roemello (aged 10)
- Michael Wright as Raynathan "Ray" Skuggs
  - Sam Gordon as Raynathan (aged 18)
  - DeVaughn Nixon as Raynathan (age 11)
- Theresa Randle as Melissa
- Leslie Uggams as Doris Holly
- Larry Joshua as Harry Molino
- Clarence Williams III as Arthur Romello "A.R." Skuggs
- Abe Vigoda as Gus Molino
- Ernie Hudson as Lolly Jonas
- Sam Bottoms as Oliver Thompson
- Joe Dallesandro as Tony Adamo
- Steve J. Harris as Ricky "Goggles"
- Raymond Serra as Sal Marconi
- O.L. Duke as "Tutty"
- Michael Guess as Young Gun "Y.G."
- Donald Adeosun Faison as Kymie Daniels
- Vondie Curtis Hall as Mark Doby
- Khandi Alexander as Ella Skuggs

== Reception ==
=== Critical response ===
On Rotten Tomatoes, the film has an approval rating of 20% based on from 10 reviews, with an average rating is 4.9/10. Metacritic, which uses a weighted average, assigned the film a score of 50 out of 100, based on 26 critics, indicating "mixed or average" reviews. Todd McCarthy of Variety called it "a self-indulgent drama" that plays like a dreary variation on New Jack City", Cooper's first film. Janet Maslin of The New York Times called it "an ambitious but terminally self-important film".

Kenneth Turan of the Los Angeles Times wrote that it "sinks under the weight of excessive violence and a welter of overwrought plot contrivances". Owen Gleiberman of Entertainment Weekly rated it C− and wrote, "Though the movie itself isn’t much — a dawdling inner-city pastiche of Mean Streets and the Godfather films — a couple of the performers do succeed in fleshing out their threadbare roles."

Michael Gonzales of Stop Smiling in 2007 referred to Cooper's first three film screenplays as his "Harlem trilogy." Gonzales said that Cooper has had an influence on "hip-hop culture that can be heard in Jay-Z’s lyrics and seen in P. Diddy’s style."

=== Year-end lists ===
- Honorable mention – Michael MacCambridge, Austin American-Statesman
- Top 18 worst (alphabetically listed, not ranked) – Michael Mills, The Palm Beach Post

== See also ==
- List of hood films
