= Past Midnight =

1991 thriller film

- Theatrical poster
- Directed by: Jan Eliasberg
- Written by: Frank Norwood
- Produced by: Lisa M. Hansen
- Starring: Rutger Hauer; Natasha Richardson; Clancy Brown; Guy Boyd
- Cinematography: Robert D. Yeoman
- Edited by: Christopher Rouse
- Music by: Steve Bartek
- Production company: CineTel Films
- Distributed by: New Line Cinema
- Release dates: October 18, 1991 (Vancouver International Film Festival); December 16, 1992 (United States)
- Running time: 100 minutes
- Country: United States
- Language: English

Past Midnight is a 1991 American neo-noir thriller film (with slasher connections) starring Rutger Hauer and Natasha Richardson, as well as co-stars Tom Wright, Clancy Brown and Paul Giamatti (making his first credited screen appearance).

== Plot ==
Parolee Ben Jordan has spent the past fifteen years behind bars for the murder of his pregnant wife. He is monitored by his parole officer Lee Samuels and social worker Laura Mathews after he is released. Mathews begins looking into his case and becomes convinced that he was convicted under circumstantial evidence and starts becoming convinced of his innocence in the crime. Before long she starts falling for him, but this is far from wise, since even if he is innocent, Mrs. Jordan's real murderer may soon come a calling.

== Cast ==
- Rutger Hauer as Ben Jordan
- Natasha Richardson as Laura Mathews
- Paul Giamatti as Larry Canipe
- Clancy Brown as Steve Lundy
- Tom Wright as Lee Samuels
- Guy Boyd as Todd Canipe
- Charles Boswell as Carlton Daniels
- Ernie Lively as Detective Allan Tobias
- Kibibi Monie as Dorothy Coleman
- Dana Eskelson as Kathy Tudor
- Ted D'Arms as Bill Tudor
- Krisha Fairchild as Dr. Zastoupil
- Sarah Magnuson as Gerrie Graymark
- David Frederick White (as Dave White) as Cop
- Brian Finney (as Brian T. Finney) as Delivery Man
- Sue Morales as Social Worker (uncredited)

== Production ==
After Quentin Tarantino significantly re-wrote the script, Catalaine Knell shared her associate producer credit with him on the film, his first official screen credit.

== Release ==
Originally intended for a theatrical release, the film aired on the USA Network on December 16, 1992. Before, the film was shown at the American Film Market and at the Vancouver International Film Festival in October of the previous year. The movie was released on videocassette and laserdisc on April 21, 1993 by Columbia TriStar Home Video, and was released on DVD by the same company on August 17, 2004, in widescreen.
