= Michael Wright (actor) =

American actor (1956–2026)

- Born: April 30, 1956; New York City, U.S.
- Died: August 19, 2026 (aged 70); Los Angeles, California, U.S.
- Occupation: Actor
- Years active: 1978–2026
- Children: 5

Michael Wright (April 30, 1956 – August 19, 2026) was an American actor best known for his roles in the films The Five Heartbeats (1991), Streamers (1983) for which he won the Volpi Cup for Best Actor, and Sugar Hill (1994), and for his television roles Elias Taylor in V: The Series (1984–1985), Omar White in Oz (2001–2003), and Lazarus Prime in Black Lightning (2019).

== Early life ==
Michael Wright was born on April 30, 1956, in New York City. He graduated from the New Lincoln School.

== Career ==
By 1978, Wright had entered the professional stage. Wright's work in television included the 1983 NBC science fiction miniseries V, the 1984 sequel V The Final Battle, and V: The Series as Elias Taylor. He appeared in the 1987 episode "Duty and Honor" of Miami Vice as "The Savage", the 1997 action movie “Money Talks” as Aaron, and on the 1997 HBO series Oz as Omar White from 2001 to 2003. Wright also appeared on New York Undercover, and as Lazarus Prime on Black Lightning.

His film roles include the 1983 war drama Streamers, with Matthew Modine, the 1987 drama The Principal, with Jim Belushi, and the 1994 film Sugar Hill with Wesley Snipes. In 1997, he played the role of Aaron in Money Talks - which starred Chris Tucker. He played Clinton, the leader of The Del Bombers gang in the 1979 film The Wanderers. He also appeared in the 2005 thriller The Interpreter. But his most memorable role came as portraying Eddie King Jr. in The Five Heartbeats in 1991.

== Death ==
Wright died of heart failure and complications from Marchiafava‑Bignami disease in Los Angeles on August 19, 2026, at age 70.

== Filmography ==
- The Wanderers (1979) as Clinton
- Streamers (1983) as Carlyle
- Lontano da dove (1983) as Sylvester
- V (1983) as Elias Taylor (2 episodes)
- V: The Final Battle (1984) as Elias Taylor (3 episodes)
- V: The Series (1984–1985) as Elias Taylor (11 episodes)
- The Laundromat (1985) as Shooter Stevens
- Miami Vice as the Savage (episode: "Duty and Honor")
- Bedtime Eyes (1987) as Spoon
- The Principal (1987) as Victor Duncan
- Private Times (1991)
- The 5 Heartbeats (1991) as Eddie King Jr.
- Sugar Hill (1994) as Raynathan "Ray" Skuggs
- New York Undercover (1996) as Rene Mazili
- The Cottonwood (1996) as Simon Z.
- Money Talks (1997) as Aaron
- Point Blank (1998) as Sonny
- Rage (1999) as "B-Boy"
- Piñero (2001) as Edgar Bowser
- Oz (2001–2003) as Omar White (22 episodes)
- Batman: Dark Tomorrow (2003) as Victor Zsasz (voice)
- Downtown: A Street Tale (2004) as Rudy
- The Interpreter (2005) as Marcus
- Before I Self Destruct (2009) as First Victim
- Rel (2018) as Mr. Donaldson
- Black Lightning (2019) as Lazarus Prime (2 episodes)
- Dope King (2025) as Willie
