= Jeff Pollack =

American filmmaker (1959–2013)

- Born: Jeffrey Ian Pollack; November 15, 1959; Los Angeles, California, U.S.
- Died: December 23, 2013 (aged 54); Hermosa Beach, California, U.S.
- Occupations: Film director, screenwriter, television producer, writer, entrepreneur
- Years active: 1990–2013
- Spouse: Solange White Pollack (divorced)
- Children: 2

Jeffrey Ian Pollack (November 15, 1959 – December 23, 2013) was an American film director, screenwriter, television producer and writer.

As a film director he made the films Above the Rim (1994), Booty Call (1997) and Lost & Found (1999).

Pollack served as executive consultant on The Tyra Banks Show. He was a frequent collaborator with Benny Medina. He was an alumnus of University of Southern California film school.

== Career ==
Following graduation from University of Southern California's Film School in the early 1980s, Pollack traveled through Asia both as a tourist and documentarian. After three years on the road — and in the rice fields and jungle— Pollack returned to the U.S., dabbling in real estate development before devoting himself to an entertainment career.

Pollack was a co-creator, writer, and producer on The Fresh Prince of Bel Air

Pollack and Benny Medina launched and ran a management/production company together, Medina/Pollack Entertainment (later becoming Handprint), with clients that included Jennifer Lopez, Mariah Carey and Tyra Banks. Pollack produced two Billboard Music Awards ceremonies in 1992 and 1993, produced the TV documentary Jennifer Lopez in Concert, and worked with Banks on her talk show.

In 1994, under the banner of Medina/Pollack Entertainment, Pollack wrote, produced and directed the urban feature film Above the Rim starring Tupac Shakur, Leon, Duane Martin and Marlon Wayans.

In 1995, Pollack and Medina renamed their company Handprint Entertainment, which has grown into one of Hollywood's most successful full-service management and production companies. Since that time Pollack took a production role on the Fox sitcom Getting Personal and remained behind the camera as director of the 1997 film Booty Call.

His spec screenplay, Gifted was one of Spec Scout's top 2013 submitted scripts, scoring above 90% of the scripts circulating by A-list agents and managers.

== Death ==
Pollack was found dead after jogging on the Greenbelt in Hermosa Beach, California, on December 23, 2013. It was assumed he died of natural causes; he was 54.
