= Chambers Brothers (gang) =

American criminal organization

The Chambers Brothers were a criminal organization heavily involved in the distribution of crack cocaine in the city of Detroit, Michigan, during the mid-1980s. At the height of their power, the gang controlled over 50 percent of the crack cocaine trade in Detroit, supplying around 700 crack houses on a daily basis, and were generating an estimated $3 million a day in sales.

== Background ==
Originally hailing from Marianna, Arkansas, the brothers consisted of Larry, Billy Joe, Willie Lee and Otis Chambers. Knowing their hometown suffered from high rates of poverty, the Chambers brothers would recruit local men to work for them as drug traffickers in Detroit for $500 a week. The gang ran a strict operation, with organization charts and lists of gang bylaws later found in several crack houses, and street dealers being warned not to attract attention by wearing gold jewelry or expensive sneakers while working for the gang. The Chambers brothers ruled their gang with an iron fist, with beatings and shootings regularly being meted out as punishment for infractions of rules or loss of income.

In February 1988, the Chambers Brothers were arrested by a joint Drug Enforcement Administration and Detroit Police Department taskforce after an 18 month investigation. As a result of the arrests, authorities seized $1 million in cash and jewelry, 68 vehicles and 250 weapons, along with 6 kilograms of cocaine. In March 1989, the Chambers Brothers were found guilty of running a major crack distribution network in Detroit between 1982 and 1988. Larry Chambers was sentenced to life in prison and a $250,000 fine; Billy Joe Chambers was sentenced to 45 years and a $500,000 fine; Otis Chambers was sentenced to 27 years and a $350,000 fine, and Willie Chambers was sentenced to 21 years and a $350,000 fine.

The Chambers Brothers also had three other sisters and a set of twin brothers. One of the twins, Fredrick, became known for being a top notch military drill sergeant in California. The siblings moved to Memphis, Tennessee, while the four brothers became notorious nationally when the Detroit Police Department confiscated video tapes of the brothers counting their laundry baskets full of money, and flaunting their excessive wealth. Their mother died in 2003.

== Cultural effects ==
In the novel Warpath by Jeffry Scott Hansen, the street gang the Six-Mile Syndicate is based loosely on the Chambers Brothers gang.

In the 1991 film New Jack City, the character Nino Brown and his associates were largely based on the Chambers Brothers. As in the movie, the Chambers Brothers were also known for taking over an apartment complex known as the Broadmoor on E. Grand Blvd and Ferry St. on the lower east side in Detroit (name was changed to "The Carter" in the film), which was used to house the gang's drug-selling operations.

The title of Detroit rapper, G. Twilight's 2018 single, "Money, Money, Money" was inspired by the braggadocios dialogue from the confiscated video tape of the Larry Chambers and one of his drug enforcers counting a laundry basket full of money. In the second verse of the song, G. Twilight mentions the Chambers specifically as a cautionary tale. G. Twilight, who is also a former drug dealer from Detroit, has mentioned the Chambers on other songs such as "Gangster, Gangster" (from the 2013 mixtape "Another Detroit Gangster Story"), "The Real Cash Money Brothers" (from the 2019 mixtape "The Detroit Cocaine 80's"), and the 2021 songs "Motor City Madness" and "The Real New Jack City" as a means of doing a then vs. now-styled compare and contrast of different era's in Detroit's underworld.
