= Jan Eliasberg =

American director, producer and writer

- Born: Jan Pringle Eliasberg; January 6, 1954 (age 72); New York City, New York, U.S.
- Education: The Brearley School Wesleyan University (BA); Yale University (MFA) MFA Program for Writers at Warren Wilson in Fiction (1996)
- Occupations: Director, producer, screenwriter, and novelist
- Years active: 1986–present
- Spouse: Neil Friedman (1991–2008)

Jan Pringle Eliasberg (born January 6, 1954) is an American film, theatre, and television director and writer. Her debut novel, Hannah's War, was published by Little, Brown in 2020 and has sold 70,000 copies to date. Hannah's War has been called "a gripping cat-and-mouse tale of love, war, deception and espionage that you won't be able to put down." Kate Quinn, author of The Alice Network and The Rose Code. The Jewish Book Council stated, "That a novel that deals fluently with physics, espionage, and Jewish tragedy can also become a deeply affecting emotional tale – with a transcendent, redemptive vision of love – is a tribute to its hugely gifted author." Hannah's War was a Finalist for the National Jewish Book Award and has been acquired for film with Eliasberg adapting the novel for the screen and directing. (Publisher's Marketplace).

== Life and career ==
Eliasberg is from New York City where she attended and graduated from The Brearley School. She is the daughter of the late Ann Pringle Harris, a writer for The New York Times and an English Professor at the Fashion Institute of Technology and the late Jay Eliasberg, a retired vice president for research at the Columbia Broadcast Group.

She graduated magna cum laude from Wesleyan University (at the age of 20 in 1974) and earned a Master's degree in directing at Yale School of Drama (1981). Eliasberg also received an MFA in Fiction from the MFA Program for Writers at Warren Wilson.

In 1973, she co-founded The Second Stage at Wesleyan University, an organization of students dedicated to producing theater and other performances, which may be the country's first solely student-run volunteer theater organization. The Second Stage is renowned for nurturing generations of theatre, film and television stars, including Lin-Manuel Miranda, whose musical In the Heights was born and workshopped on Wesleyan's Second Stage.

Chosen by the prestigious American Film Institute's Directing Workshop for Women, Eliasberg began her television directing career in 1986 directing an episode of Cagney & Lacey. Later that year, she was hand-picked by Michael Mann to direct an episode of Miami Vice, becoming the first of only three female directors of that series. She directed two more Miami Vice episodes in 1986 and 1987, including "Forgive Us Our Debts," and "Contempt of Court" starring Stanley Tucci.

She was also the first woman to direct an episode of Michael Mann's Crime Story as well as Wiseguy. Her other television directing credits include multiple episodes of Bull, Nashville, The Magicians, Blue Bloods, NCIS: Los Angeles, Parenthood, Criminal Minds, 21 Jump Street, Dawson's Creek, Sisters (also a producer and writer), Early Edition and Party of Five, among many other series.

In early 1988, she was hired to direct the teen comedy How I Got into College, but was replaced only five days into filming by Savage Steve Holland. Neither Eliasberg nor Fox officially commented on the firing, though one anonymous Fox executive was quoted as stating that Eliasberg's approach was more sophisticated than what the studio wanted, saying, "She was giving us Thirtysomething and we wanted Laverne & Shirley." In 1991 she got another opportunity to direct a film: Past Midnight was a low-budget independent film produced by CineTel starring Rutger Hauer; Natasha Richardson; Clancy Brown, and Paul Giamatti.

She has directed such plays as Spring Awakening, Bertolt Brecht's Saint Joan of the Stockyards, Peer Gynt, Hedda Gabler, The Threepenny Opera, the American premiere of Howard Brenton's Sore Throats and The Importance of Being Earnest.

After receiving her MFA in Fiction in 1996, Eliasberg was hired to write, produce and direct the NBC series Sisters, starring Sela Ward, Swoosie Kurtz, Patricia Kalember, George Clooney, Ashley Judd and Paul Rudd. She remained on Sisters for all six seasons the series was on the air.

She has written screenplays, all with strong female leads, and often about women who have been erased from history, for Warner Brothers, Universal, Fox and Sony. Her screenplay W.A.S.P., about the Women Air Service Pilots in WWII, was written for Cameron Diaz and Nicole Kidman. Her original screenplay, Mi Corazon, has Jennifer Lopez attached to produce and star.

During her research into the lives of the W.A.S.P., she came upon an article in The New York Times published on the day the atomic bomb was dropped on Hiroshima. Below the fold, a paragraph read: "The key component that allowed the Allies to develop the atomic bomb was brought to the Allies by a 'female, non-Aryan physicist." Wondering why the name of this mysterious physicist, responsible for perhaps the most important discovery of the 20th Century, wasn't emblazoned across every history and science textbook, Eliasberg was determined to discover the name of this woman: Dr. Lise Meitner who, along with her German colleague, Otto Hahn, discovered and named nuclear fission. This became the germ of inspiration for Eliasberg's novel, Hannah's War.

== Personal life ==
In 1991, Eliasberg married Neil Alan Friedman, a studio executive at Columbia Pictures. They divorced in 2008. They have a daughter, Sariel Hana Friedman. Eliasberg currently lives in New York City where she is adapting her novel, Hannah's War, for the screen, as well as researching her next book.

== Directorial work ==
=== Television ===
- Cagney & Lacey
- Jack and Mike
- L.A. Law
- Miami Vice
- Crime Story
- Wiseguy
- Dirty Dancing
- TV 101
- Booker (also writer)
- The Outsiders
- Brewster Place
- WIOU
- Sisters (also writer)
- Early Edition
- Party of Five
- Any Day Now
- Dawson's Creek
- Nash Bridges
- Strong Medicine
- Ghost Whisperer
- Parenthood
- Supernatural
- Criminal Minds
- NCIS: Los Angeles
- Blue Bloods
- In Plain Sight
- Unforgettable
- Reckless
- Nashville
- The Magicians

=== Films ===
- Lovers, Partners & Spies (Independent film, 1988)
- Past Midnight (Feature film, 1991) starring Natasha Richardson, Rutger Hauer, Clancy Brown and Paul Giamatti

=== Theatre ===
- Autumn Ladies and Their Lover's Lovers
- Spring Awakening
- St. Joan of the Stockyards
- Sore Throats
- Hedda Gabler
- Peer Gynt
- A Christmas Tapestry
- Brecht on Brecht
- A Lesson from Aloes
- A History of the American Film
- Macbeth
- A Midsummer Night's Dream
- The Threepenny Opera
- Reckless
- The Cote D'Azur Triangle
- The Brides
- The Importance of Being Earnest
- Through the Leaves
- Request for "L"
