= Young Boys Inc. =

American drug cartel

Young Boys Incorporated, also known as Y.B.I., was a major drug organization in Detroit, Michigan, who were among the first African American drug cartels to operate on inner-city street corners. The Young Boys were innovative, opening franchises in other cities, promoting brand names, and unleashing extreme brutality to frighten away rivals.

Y.B.I. emerged at the end of the 1970s. Their modus operandi was using minors to be couriers of heroin. If police captured them, they were ineligible to receive the same criminal penalties as adults because of their juvenile status. Meanwhile, the leaders, adults aged in their late teens and very early 20s, remained largely insulated from law enforcement action for many years.

== History ==
In 1976, the group was formed by a bunch of Detroit neighborhood friends all in their late teens at Birney Elementary School's playground. Dwayne Davis (a.k.a. Wonderful Wayne), Bernard Boykins (aka Bone Man) Reginald Chestnut (aka Nut) and Charles Lindsey (a.k.a. Choicey Chuck) were the original founders at the time. Shortly after the formation of Y.B.I., a man from the same neighborhood named Raymond Peoples(aka Baby Ray) joined and became a boss. Two years later, Butch Jones (a.k.a. Big Boy) was paroled from prison and joined the organization became a boss and started his own family. It was about this time that Y.B.I. split into three separate crews: Dwayne Davis, Raymond Peoples, and Butch Jones. They controlled about 80% of the heroin traffic in Detroit from the summer of 1978 through 1987.

From the start, Y.B.I.'s main place of operation was the Dexter/Davison neighborhood on Detroit's Northwest side. About two years after its formation, Y.B.I. completely took over the heroin trade in and around Detroit with sales estimated at $300,000 per day. After the split, Davis sent one of his top lieutenants to Boston to expand his operation. After about a year, the crew, along with new members from Boston, took over most of that city's heroin trade. Sales peaked in Boston at about $70,000 per day.

The organization in Detroit was seriously crippled in September 1982, when it was alleged that Butch Jones ordered the execution of Davis over a turf dispute. Davis was gunned down at the corner of Columbus and Lawton on Detroit's west side. A few months later, on December 7, Raymond Peoples, Butch Jones, and 41 of Y.B.I.'s top Lieutenants were indicted, convicted, and later sentenced to long prison terms. Many believed that because of Davis' death, none of his crew were indicted. After Peoples was released from prison, he was shot dead as he sat in a car on the city's west side in 1985.

The lieutenant that Davis sent to Boston, James Cooper, better known as "Pep", followed the YBI blueprint and what he learned from his mentors, Dwyane Davis, Raymond Peoples, and Butch Jones in Detroit. He and his crew eventually took over the vast majority of that city's heroin trade. Pep came back to Detroit after Davis' death and took over what was left of Y.B.I. They operated for about another six years, taking the group to another level until crack cocaine quickly surpassed heroin as the inner-city drug of choice.

One of the members who came back from Boston with Pep was Steven Sealy. Sealy is best known for being gunned down and killed as he sat in Whitney Houston's Bentley in front of a Boston club. In the car with him was Bobby Brown. Butch Jones was released after serving 12 years in federal prison. He was eventually indicted again on drug and murder charges. Jones cooperated with federal authorities for a lesser sentence. Young Boys Inc. is the subject of hundreds of newspaper articles, dozens of documentaries, and at least two published books. "YBI": The Autobiography of Butch Jones and Bound By Honor, Torn by Greed: The True and Untold story of The Young Boys Inc. Y.B.I'.s reputation and system of organization impacted and influenced drug gangs nationally during the 1980s and 1990s. Consequently, after their downfall, other black Detroit drug cartels copied their organizational structure. Many gangs, such as "Best Friends", "Pony Down", "Black Mafia Family", and "The Chambers Brothers", rose to prominence in the wake of the YBI and were featured together in a Black Entertainment Television documentary series entitled American Gangster.
