= El Mokhtar =

Horse actor

- El Mokhtar
- Breed: Arabian
- Sire: Galal
- Grandsire: Nazeer
- Dam: Mohga
- Maternal grandsire: El Sareei
- Sex: Stallion
- Foaled: February 9, 1971
- Died: December 31, 1983 (aged 12)
- Country: Egypt
- Color: Black
- Last updated on: January 13, 2008.

El Mokhtar (February 9, 1971 – December 31, 1983) was an Arabian horse, and one of three black Arabian stallions used to portray "The Black" in the second Black Stallion film, The Black Stallion Returns.

El Mokhtar was imported by a syndicate of American Arabian breeders in 1975. El Mokhtar was of Egyptian Arabian bloodlines, rarely shown, and originally not even broke to ride because he was considered valuable.

== The Black Stallion ==
Shortly after his arrival in America, El Mokhtar was seen by The Black Stallion author Walter Farley. An offer was made for El Mokhtar's services for the role of 'The Black' for the first Black Stallion film, but it was firmly declined by his syndicate. Black Stallion trainer Corky Randall also liked El Mokhtar, and, at Randall's urging, the movie studio bought out the entire 40-member syndicate in order to secure El Mokhtar for the second Black Stallion film.

El Mokhtar was one of three black Arabian stallions used to portray the Black in the second film. The director loved his huge, expressive eyes, so he appears in several close-up shots. More important to the film was how El Mokhtar could run; he is the Black in the cross-country race. The native extras riding the other horses were urged to make a real race of it. The 'come from behind' win of 'The Black' is the product of a real race.

El Mokhtar was also trained to do the 'courting' scenes with the gray gelding Talishma, who played the mare Johar in the film. Those scenes were scheduled as the last to be shot. Just prior to the filming date, El Mokhtar developed a severe case of horse colic. No modern veterinary facility was available in Morocco, making surgery impossible, and as a result, El Mokhtar was humanely euthanized on the set December 31, 1983. An autopsy revealed a severe twist, and a rupture; even if surgery had been possible, it is very unlikely he would have survived.

El Mokhtar was unusually tall for a purebred Arabian, and very 'Egyptian' in type with a long, clean-cut neck, small head, and fine boned for his size. El Mokhtar was not only a good athlete - the work in the Black Stallion film was strenuous and demanding - but he also had a very good nature and was a willing performer. Corky Randall said, "He just never did anything wrong."
