= The Adventures of the Black Stallion =

- Season 1 DVD cover
- Also known as: The New Adventures of the Black Stallion
- Genre: Adventure; Drama
- Starring: Mickey Rooney; Richard Ian Cox
- Theme music composer: Terry Frewer
- Opening theme: "We Know the Wind"
- Ending theme: "We Know the Wind" (instrumental)
- Countries of origin: Canada; France; New Zealand
- Original language: English
- No. of seasons: 3
- No. of episodes: 78

Production
- Executive producer: Tom Parkinson
- Producer: Jonathan Hackett
- Production locations: Canada; France; New Zealand
- Running time: 30 minutes
- Production companies: Alliance Communications; Atlantique Productions

Original release
- Network: The Family Channel; YTV; M6
- Release: September 15, 1990 – May 16, 1993

Related
- The Black Stallion; The Black Stallion Returns

The Adventures of the Black Stallion is a drama television series that starred Mickey Rooney and Richard Ian Cox, as a trainer and a teenaged horse racer and was loosely based on The Black Stallion book series by Walter Farley. The series originally ran on The Family Channel and YTV from September 15, 1990, to May 16, 1993, before cancellation. It has since been shown in re-runs throughout the world. Mickey Rooney is the only original cast member from The Black Stallion film to reprise his role in the show. In France, the show ran on M6 from April 20, 1991.

Most of the episodes in the first season are set around Canada. During the second and third season, the show moves away from the farm, and has many episodes set in New Zealand, Paris, and the United States. The Adventures of The Black Stallion was filmed on location in British Columbia, Canada, as well as France and New Zealand. Sixteen horses portrayed The Black across the three countries.

== Synopsis ==
The show follows the life of fifteen-year-old horse racer Alec Ramsay (Richard Ian Cox), his wild stallion The Black, and their trainer Henry Dailey (Mickey Rooney). In the series, Alec's father died before the series start, leaving Alec and his mother to run Hopeful Farm. The show focuses both on life at Hopeful Farm and on the racing circuit. During the first season, most of the races are unprofessional circuit races and match races because The Black's an unpapered horse, meaning there is no proof of his lineage. During the second season, The Black's history is uncovered and Alec is able to obtain his papers, allowing him to be raced on the professional circuits around the world.

The series maintained that Alec was the only one who can ride The Black. He is known for having a violent temper with anyone besides Alec, though he does allow some people around the farm to hold his halter and lead him around, most notably Henry. He only seems to do grudgingly, however, and tends to be far less tolerant of others if Alec isn't around to keep him under control. To help keep the high-strung horse calm at the track, the gelding Napoleon is frequently taken on the road with them.

== Characters ==
- Mickey Rooney as Henry Dailey
- Richard Ian Cox as Alec Ramsay
- Marian Filali as Nicole Berthier (Season 2 - Season 3)
- Michele Goodger as Belle Ramsey (Season 1)
- Virginie Demians as Catherine Varnier (Season 1)
- Jean-Paul Solal as Pierre Chastel (Season 1)
- David Taylor as Nathaniel 'Nate' MacKay (Season 3)
- Docs Keepin Time as The Black

== Episode list ==
When the show was first aired, many of the episodes were shown out of production order, especially during the first season.

Season	Episodes	Originally released	
Season	Episodes	First released	Last released
1	26	September 15, 1990	March 10, 1991
2	26	September 1, 1991	February 23, 1992
3	26	October 4, 1992	May 16, 1993

=== Season 1 (1990–91) ===
No. overall	No. in season	Title	Directed by	Written by	Original release date	Prod. code
1	1	"Where There's a Will"	George Bloomfield	Clive Endersby	September 15, 1990	101
Henry (Mickey Rooney) has an attack of angina while training Alec (Richard Ian Cox) and The Black (Docs Keepin Time) and plans to quit training.
2	2	"First Among Equals"	Neill Fearnley	Bill Hurst	September 22, 1990	103
Catherine has to overcome sexism as she tries to realize her dream of becoming a jockey.
3	3	"Long Way Home"	Al Simmonds	Dennis Foon	September 29, 1990	104
When Belle is blinded by a chemical substance, Alec leaves the road to be with her. This leaves Henry to bring the horses back by trailer, only to have The Black run away from him.
4	4	"Star Quality"	Peter D. Marshall	Clive Endersby	October 6, 1990	109
Alec is star-struck when he and The Black are hired to be in a movie, not realizing the director's plans will put their lives at risk. Guest star: Yvonne De Carlo.
5	5	"The Big Fix"	Jim Purdy	Rick Drew	October 13, 1990	108
A competing trainer and his sister try to fix a race by using an ultrasonic device to send The Black into uncontrollable rages.
6	6	"Vigil"	George Bloomfield	Brad Wright	October 20, 1990	102
Napoleon gets kicked in the stomach by another horse and suffers from colic, a potentially lethal condition. The Black won't allow anyone into the barn, except Alec, as he keeps vigil over his friend.
7	7	"Stowaway"	Neill Fearnley	Carl Binder	October 27, 1990	105
A teenage track star named Bobby, stows away in The Black's trailer after running away from his demanding father. Henry and Alec find themselves helping the two reconcile.
8	8	"King of the Cowboys"	Stuart Gillard	Tom and Sally Drake	November 3, 1990	110
When Alec and The Black stop at a rodeo before a race, a former rodeo champion named Johnny King, wanting to make a comeback is determined to ride The Black.
9	9	"Pony Express Ride"	Ken Jubenvill	Hart Hanson	November 10, 1990	107
Alec and The Black re-create the last Pony Express Ride, which turns into a fight for survival when a young Native American teen sabotages the trail and jumps Alec. Alec then befriends the young man.
10	10	"Last Race"	Alan Simmonds	Clive Endersby	November 17, 1990	113
Henry's illiteracy is used against him to get The Black in a claims race where he must carry a dangerous amount of extra weight and the losing horse will be forfeit to the winner. Guest star: Abe Vigoda
11	11	"Fireworks"	Paolo Barzman	Brad Wright	November 25, 1990	116
Henry and Alec spend a holiday weekend with an old friend of Henry's and his 15-year-old alcoholic granddaughter named Jackie.
12	12	"Double Cross"	Peter Rowe	Fred Frame and Stephen Mitchell	December 2, 1990	114
A gambler named Lenard Grimes from Henry's past attempts to blackmail him into fixing one of The Black's races.
13	13	"Sweet Tooth"	Stuart Gillard	Lyal and Barbara Brown	December 9, 1990	112
The Black fails his drug test after a match race because he was given a chocolate bar which gets him disqualified from the race and Henry's license gets suspended. Henry and Alec must prove someone else did it.
14	14	"Trapped"	Ken Jubenvill	Brad Wright	December 16, 1990	115
While stopped at an old friend of Henry's, Alec and a bratty asthmatic boy named Dennis get trapped in a grain silo.
15	15	"A Friend in Need"	Nanci Rossov	Clive Endersby	December 23, 1990	106
Alec befriends a young man named Mike who has Down syndrome and fights to overcome Langley's prejudice.
16	16	"Killer"	Peter D. Marshall	Aubrey Solomon	December 30, 1990	111
A paparazzo photographer, attacked and injured by The Black, gets a judge to order The Black be destroyed as a dangerous animal, causing Alec to run away with him.
17	17	"The Black Pearl"	Peter Rowe	Lyal and Barbara Brown	January 6, 1991	117
A man claiming to be an old friend of Alec's father kidnaps Alec and The Black.
18	18	"The Long Run"	Paolo Barzman	Rick Drew	January 13, 1991	118
Alec, worried that he might be getting too heavy weighted to be a jockey, goes on a dangerous crash diet and exercise regimen.
19	19	"Kidnapped"	Alan Simmonds	Vincent Fournier	January 20, 1991	119
Alec, Henry, and Catherine give chase when The Black is stolen and taken to France.
20	20	"The Comeback"	Alain Nahum	Fabrice Ziolkowski and Luli Barzman	January 27, 1991	120
The Black loses his spirit after he must stay two weeks in a quarantine in France. Note: At this point the show moves to Europe, primarily France, in part because the group must raise enough money to pay for The Black's flight home.
21	21	"Black at Heart"	Jean-Pierre Prévost	Renée Nelson	February 3, 1991	122
Tabari, the Arabian princess whose father originally bred The Black, tries to borrow him for one year in exchange for proof of his blood lines.
22	22	"Heart of Gold"	Paolo Barzman	Elizabeth Baxter	February 10, 1991	123
Catherine is swept off her feet by a charming Frenchman, while the team prepares for a charity event that culminates in an auction for a million dollars' worth of diamonds.
23	23	"The Judge"	Olivier Deschamps	Martin Brossollet	February 17, 1991	124
When a friend's horse comes up lame, Alec and the Black risk their lives by taking his place in a steeplechase to save the boy's farm from bankruptcy.
24	24	"Found Money"	Paolo Barzman	Jean-Vincent Fournier	February 24, 1991	125
Alec finds a cache of money that was stolen from a bank years ago by robbers who are still on the loose.
25	25	"The Neuchatel Stallion"	Bernard Dumont	Stéphane Palay	March 3, 1991	126
While visiting a French château for a match race, Henry encounters a glowing white stallion. Guest Star: Bruce Meyer
26	26	"The Choice"	Bernard Dumont	Martin Brossollet	March 10, 1991	121
When a friendly race ends in the painful death of another horse, Alec wants to stop racing The Black and considers accepting a scholarship to a French riding academy.

=== Season 2 (1991–92) ===
No. overall	No. in season	Title	Directed by	Written by	Original release date	Prod. code
27	1	"Barn Burner"	Bernard Dumont	Jonathan Hackett	September 1, 1991	201
The Black's life is threatened by the only person more feared and hated than a horse thief, a barn burner. A young woman named Nicole Berthier (Marian Filali) is blamed for the barn burning.
28	2	"Machine Rider"	Olivier Deschamps	Elizabeth Baxter	September 8, 1991	205
Alec brushes shoulders with a competing jockey who will do whatever it takes to beat The Black, including testing Alec's ability as a jockey while using a battery-orperated electric horsewhip.
29	3	"Diamonds"	Michel Tréguer	Martin Brossellet	September 15, 1991	202
When diamond thieves hid a bag of diamonds in The Black's trailer and discovered missing, Alec and Nicole become the hunted.
30	4	"Chateau Sauvage"	Michel Tréguer	Jean-Vincent Fournier	September 22, 1991	203
The Black is kidnapped by a well meaning animal rights activist and will be shipped back to the Arabian Peninsula unless Alec can prove The Black wishes to stay with him. The Black finally comes back to Alec's possession after a while.
31	5	"Killer Stallion"	Olivier Deschamps	Fabrice Ziolkowski	September 29, 1991	204
Due to foul play, The Black is not only banned from the French racing circuit, but has a price on his head due to having drugs in his feed.
32	6	"The Alhambra Zarr"	Christian Le Hemonet	Tracy Kennedy	October 6, 1991	206
Henry, Alec, Nicole, and The Black's lives are put into jeopardy after The Black's lineage is traced back to one of King Charles' stallions, The Alhambra Zarr.
33	7	"Almost Home"	Alan Simmonds	Charles Lazer	October 13, 1991	207
While waiting in a holding barn prior to the trip back to America, trouble rises when the veterinarian's son, an animal hater, sets his sights on hurting The Black which means that Alec and Nicole must try to break him out. Note: Nicole had stowed away in a cargo container, and ends up in Canada thinking that she is in the United States.
34	8	"Deadliest Bidder"	Alan Simmonds	Lyle Slack	October 20, 1991	208
A cunning and dangerous Arab man, Salim Al Duwish, tries to steal The Black to resurrect his plague decimated herd. He attempts to shoot Alec for The Black, but the two get away.
35	9	"Blackout"	Mitch Gabourie	Dennis Foo	October 27, 1991	209
Resulting from a fall off The Black, Alec has amnesia and joins some local ranchers who name him John, to help shoot a wild mustang, The Black, recently spotted in the area, and makes the herd of mustangs escape the coral and the local ranchers, and Alec go after him. When The Black is found, Alec is told to shoot him. Then Alec remembers who he is and drops the gun and goes over to The Black.
36	10	"Detour"	Mitch Gabourie	Lyal & Barbara Brown	November 3, 1991	210
Driving to a race, Alec and Nicole are forced to take a detour which results in an ambush.
37	11	"Island Stallion"	Bill Corcoran	Dawn Ritchie	November 10, 1991	211
A mysterious island stallion named Lizzy's Edge, arrives on the scene with a beautiful young jockey named Elizabeth, a girl from a small remote island named Azul who Alec falls in love with. Note: The stallion is named after Elizabeth.
38	12	"Ostracized"	Bill Corcoran	Jonathan Hackett	November 17, 1991	212
In The Black's first U.S. race, Alec must compete against a group of jockeys who take their practical jokes too far.
39	13	"Black Spirit"	William Fruet	Dawn Ritchie	November 24, 1991	213
Alec and The Black save the life of a Native American embarked on a spiritual quest and in the process mend their own troubled relationship.
40	14	"Free Will"	William Fruet	Dawn Ritchie	December 1, 1991	214
The Black runs away when the rig breaks down, which results in being held captive by a ruthless businessman.
41	15	"Hard Road Home"	Nicholas Kendall	Jana Veverka	December 8, 1991	215
After being accidentally thrown from The Black, Alec is badly injured and is afraid to ride again.
42	16	"The Arkansas Twister"	Nicholas Kendall	Michael Mercer	December 15, 1991	216
Alec is upset at his mother's intention to remarry.
43	17	"Fatal Heart"	Peter Rowe	Renee Nelson (story), Lyal & Barbara Brown (teleplay)	December 22, 1991	217
Alec is swept off his feet by a beautiful Chinese student named Lia Sing, but is later discovered that she is part of a ring that wants to steal The Black for stallion fights in China.
44	18	"Ticket to Ride"	Peter Rowe	Jean-Vincent Fournier	December 29, 1991	218
Nicole unexpectedly wins her first race as a jockey only to find herself involved with ruthless people who neglect to tell her she and the horse are expendable. The episode's title is borrowed of The Beatles song Ticket to Ride.
45	19	"Deadwood Kid"	Alan Simmonds	Michael Mercer	January 5, 1992	219
Alec, Nicole, and The Black find themselves in a ghost town at the mercy of a deluded man who has a plan for The Black's future.
46	20	"Horse of the Year"	Alan Simmonds	Jana Veverka	January 12, 1992	220
When The Black is named Horse of the Year, the success goes to Alec's head and he becomes a spoiled brat.
47	21	"If The Shoe Fits"	Peter Rowe	Dawn Ritchie	January 19, 1992	221
An unscrupulous vet tries to cripple The Black with the help of Nicole's father.
48	22	"Code of Silence"	Peter Rowe	Jana Veverka	January 26, 1992	222
A teenage motorcycle gang kidnaps The Black and leaves him to die.
49	23	"Black Tide"	Alan Simmonds	Louise Vincent	February 2, 1992	223
The Black is challenged by another black stallion who turns out to be The Black's son named Black Tide.
50	24	"Going, Going, Gone"	Alan Simmonds	Dawn Ritchie	February 9, 1992	224
Alec is tricked into putting The Black on the auction block.
51	25	"The Incredible Ride"	Nicholas Kendall	Phillipe Berenger	February 16, 1992	225
When Henry gets a concussion in a car accident, Alec and The Black are his only hope.
52	26	"Ties That Bind"	Nicholas Kendall	Dawn Ritchie	February 23, 1992	226
The Black falls into a 20-foot hole.

=== Season 3 (1992–93) ===
No. overall	No. in season	Title	Directed by	Written by	Original release date	Prod. code
53	1	"Out of Sight, Out of Mind"	Paolo Barzman	Malcolm Macrury	October 4, 1992	301
The Black becomes uncontrollable after Alec leaves to follow Nicole back to France.
54	2	"The Race of Time"	Paolo Barzman	Peter White	October 11, 1992	302
An impromptu race pits Alec and Nicole against each other.
55	3	"The Knight's Contract"	Emilio Pacull	Etienne Baxter	October 18, 1992	303
Alec's dream through the mirrors reality when he must fight for the hand of Nicole he loves.
56	4	"Bedside Manner"	Laurent Bregeat	Peter Mitchell	October 25, 1992	304
When a hunter's carelessness injures The Black, Alec must trust his horse to an unknown vet.
57	5	"Breakin' Loose"	Jean Achache	Stephane Palay	November 1, 1992	305
Henry sends Alec and Nicole into France, and ends up bailing them out of jail.
58	6	"Seeing Double"	Laurent Bregeat	Fabrice Ziolkowski	November 8, 1992	306
A foiled attempt to steal The Black ends with Black Tide being stolen.
59	7	"Back on Track"	Jean Achache	Dawn Ritchie	November 29, 1992	307
Alec races The Black to a hollow victory when his arch rival suffers a devastating fall.
60	8	"Winning Spirit"	Peter Sharp	Michael Mercer	December 6, 1992	308
When The Black loses an important race in France, Alec, Nicole, and The Black follow Henry to New Zealand.
61	9	"Nightmare"	Peter Sharp	Michael Mercer	December 13, 1992	309
Only Nate can convince Alec and The Black that a dangerous rogue stallion is not what he appears to be.
62	10	"Wild Oats"	Mark DeFriest	Peter Mitchell	January 3, 1993	310
Having escaped into the New Zealand countryside, The Black searches for freedom only to save Alec's life.
63	11	"Local Hero"	Peter Sharp	Peter Mitchell	January 17, 1993	311
Alec is cornered into racing The Black at the local fair, only to learn more is at stake.
64	12	"Driving Mr. Dailey"	Mark DeFriest	Elizabeth Baxter	January 10, 1993	312
When the truck breaks down, Henry and Nate are stuck on the road.
65	13	"Measure of a Man"	Peter Sharp	Etienne Baxter	February 7, 1993	313
Alec is challenged by a rival jockey to prove he can win on any horse.
66	14	"At the Gate"	Dan McKirdy	Julie Lacey	February 14, 1993	314
A devastating fall nearly ends Nicole's career as a jockey.
67	15	"Criss Cross"	Dan McKirdy	Dawn Ritchie	February 21, 1993	315
Alec and The Black endure a grueling cross-country race.
68	16	"Riding the Volcano"	Peter Sharp	Julie Lacey	February 28, 1993	316
Alec falls for a beautiful horse trainer. Guest star: Lucy Lawless
69	17	"A Gift Horse"	Peter Sharp	Peter Mitchell	March 7, 1993	317
Nicole gets more than she bargained for on her birthday.
70	18	"Racing in the Streets"	Mike Smith	Peter Mitchell	March 14, 1993	318
Nicole falls for a handsome man. Guest star: Christopher Atkins
71	19	"Back in America"	Ian Mune	Julie Lacey	March 21, 1993	319
Alec is tempted by a trip back to America.
72	20	"Pledging Allegiances"	Aileen O'Sullivan	Leo Cadie	March 28, 1993	320
Alec's plans to help support the Riding Therapy Center are jeopardized when Nate steals the family's horses to join a group.
73	21	"Tapu"	Ian Mune	Jana Veverka	April 11, 1993	321
On an archaeological expedition, Nicole and Kerry are nearly killed in an explosion set by a young Maori intent on preserving his heritage.
74	22	"A House Divided"	Aileen O'Sullivan	Jana Veverka	April 18, 1993	322
The family's future at Manukau Farm is jeopardized when Henry's cousin arrives demanding custody of Nate. Guest star: Susan Clarke
75	23	"A Day at the Beach"	Mike Smith	Jean Vincent Fournier	April 25, 1993	323
A day at the beach turns disastrous for Alec and Nicole.
76	24	"Legends Never Die"	Ian Mune	Michael Mercer	May 2, 1993	324
A former racing great steps in while Henry is gone. Guest stars: Conrad Bain and Marc Singer
77	25	"Glory Days"	Ian Mune	Peter Mitchell	May 9, 1993	325
Alec fears The Black may have to surrender his crown to Black Tide. Guest star: Teri Austin
78	26	"Under October Skies"	Ian Mune	Jana Veverka	May 16, 1993	326
The Black comes to the defense of a young mare being threatened by a wild stallion. Guest star: Margot Kidder

== Reception ==
In 1991, the series was nominated for a Young Artist Award in the "Best Off-Prime Time or Cable Family Series" category, and while it lost to Harry and the Hendersons, Richard Ian Cox won the award for the "Best Young Actor Starring in an Off-Prime Time or Cable Family Series" category. Cox was nominated again in 1992 for the "Best Young Actor Starring in a Cable Series" category. In the same year, Mickey Rooney was nominated for a Gemini Award in the category of "Best Performance by an Actor in a Continuing Leading Dramatic Role" for his portrayal of Henry Dailey.

== Other media ==
=== Film ===
Other theatrical films, The Black Stallion (1979), The Black Stallion Returns (1983), and The Young Black Stallion (2003) were also based on Farley's book series.

=== DVD releases ===
Echo Bridge Entertainment released all three seasons on DVD in Region 1 in 2006, 2007, and 2008. These releases contain the episodes arranged in production order instead of air date.

Alliance Home Entertainment has released all three seasons on DVD in Canada.

DVD name	Ep #	Region 1 (US)	Region 1 (CAN)
Season 1	26	December 5, 2006	October 19, 2010
Season 2	26	May 8, 2007	November 9, 2010
Season 3	26	May 27, 2008	February 22, 2011
