= Cass Ole =

Arabian stallion

- Cass Ole in The Black Stallion
- Breed: Arabian
- Sire: Al-Marah Cassanova
- Grandsire: Rapture
- Dam: La Bahia
- Maternal grandsire: Hanrah
- Sex: Stallion
- Foaled: March 6, 1969
- Died: June 29, 1993 (aged 24)
- Country: United States
- Color: Black
- Breeder: Donoghue Arabians
- Owner: San Antonio Arabians
- Last updated on: January 13, 2008.

Cass Ole (March 6, 1969–June 29, 1993) was a Texan-bred Arabian stallion. Originally bred to be a show horse, he was National Champion in Arabian Western Pleasure in 1975, National Reserve Champion Arabian Ladies Side Saddle in 1976, and U.S. Top Ten Arabian English Pleasure in both 1975 and 1976. He won over 50 championships and over 20 Reserve Championships in his seven-year show career and was high point winner of the King Saud Trophy of the American Horse Show Association (now United States Equestrian Federation).

Cass Ole played The Black in the films The Black Stallion and The Black Stallion Returns.

== The Black Stallion ==
Horse trainers Glenn Randall and his sons J.R. and Corky Randall began their international search for a black Arabian to play The Black in The Black Stallion. They found Cass Ole at his ranch in San Antonio, and his temperament and appearance suited him for the role. His owners stipulated that he was not to be used in the running or swimming scenes, so three other horses were obtained for use in those shots, as well as for stunts. Cass Ole and his fellow horse actors trained at a California ranch for several weeks before filming began. He had sessions with the young actor in the lead role, Kelly Reno, so the two could become familiar and get used to working with one another.

Cass Ole was naturally a black-colored horse, but he had white markings on his pasterns and a white star on his forehead which were dyed black for his screen time.

The stallion was born at Donoghue Arabian Horse Farm in Goliad, Texas, owned by Louise and Gerald Donoghue, who sold him to his owners in San Antonio who purchased him for showing with their daughter.

His mane as seen in the two movies was partially enhanced. A wig was weaved into his mane to make it appear longer for the films.

== Later life ==
After the two films had been released Cass Ole became a celebrity, showing up to be admired at fundraisers and special events. In 1980 he won the Humane Society Award for The Prevention of Cruelty To Animals at the International Horse Show in Washington, D.C. He visited the White House and was present at the inauguration of United States president Ronald Reagan.

He performed before audiences in Italy, Sardinia, Algeria, and Morocco. His last performance took place in the Tacoma Dome in Tacoma, Washington. His retirement show was under the direction of professional horse trainer George Gipson of Tenaha, Texas. He stood at stud at his home ranch in Texas, siring over 130 foals.

Cass Ole was euthanized in 1993 after suffering from severe colic.
