= The Black Stallion (film) =

1979 film by Carroll Ballard

- Theatrical release poster
- Directed by: Carroll Ballard
- Screenplay by: Melissa Mathison; Jeanne Rosenberg; William D. Wittliff
- Based on: The Black Stallion; 1941 novel by Walter Farley
- Produced by: Fred Roos; Tom Sternberg
- Starring: Kelly Reno; Teri Garr; Clarence Muse; Hoyt Axton; Michael Higgins; Mickey Rooney
- Cinematography: Caleb Deschanel
- Edited by: Robert Dalva
- Music by: Carmine Coppola
- Color process: Technicolor
- Production company: American Zoetrope
- Distributed by: United Artists
- Release date: October 17, 1979
- Running time: 118 minutes
- Country: United States
- Language: English
- Budget: $2.7 million
- Box office: $37.8 million

The Black Stallion is a 1979 American adventure film based on the 1941 classic children's novel of the same name by Walter Farley. The film starts in 1946, five years after the book was published. It tells the story of Alec Ramsey, a boy who is shipwrecked on a deserted island with a wild Arabian stallion that he befriends. After being rescued, they are set on entering a race challenging two champion horses.

The film was adapted by Melissa Mathison, Jeanne Rosenberg, and William D. Wittliff. It was directed by Carroll Ballard in his feature directional debut and stars Kelly Reno in his film debut, Teri Garr, Hoyt Axton, Michael Higgins and Mickey Rooney with the Arabian horse Cass Ole playing the eponymous Black Stallion. The film features music by Carmine Coppola, the father of Hollywood producer Francis Ford Coppola, who is credited as executive producer.

In 2002, The Black Stallion was selected for preservation in the United States National Film Registry by the Library of Congress, being deemed "culturally, historically, or aesthetically significant".

== Plot ==
In 1946, preteen Alec Ramsey is travelling by steamer off the coast of North Africa, where he sees a wild black stallion being forced onto the boat. Captivated, Alec sneaks to the horse's stall to feed him some sugar cubes, but he is caught by the horse's supposed owner, who tells him in Arabic to stay away from Shetan.

Later, his father shows Alec his winnings from a card game and gives him a pocketknife and a small statue of Bucephalus, telling the story of how Alexander the Great became Bucephalus's master. Later that night, Alec is thrown out of his bunk during a storm. The ship is engulfed in flames and is sinking. In the chaos, Alec makes his way to the black stallion and frees him. The horse then jumps into the sea. Alec is thrown overboard by the waves and grabs the ropes of the stallion's restraints just as the ship explodes, rendering him unconscious.

Alec wakes on the shore of a deserted island and finds the stallion caught in his restraints. With his knife, he frees the stallion again and names him The Black. As Alec suddenly faces a cobra, The Black kills the snake, only to run off.

Alec decides to get closer to The Black and offers him some seaweed. The hungry stallion eventually finds himself unable to resist, and the bond between them is sealed. After many failed attempts, Alec rides The Black, and they travel the beaches. One day, a fishing ship arrives, rescuing the two.

Back in America, Alec is given a hero's welcome. The Black has a temporary home in his back yard, but a garbage man startles the horse, who races off. The next day, Alec finds the stallion in the barn of Henry Dailey, a retired racehorse jockey, and arranges for The Black to stay at the barn.

When Alec wonders how fast the horse is, he and Henry train The Black for the racetrack, while Henry teaches Alec how to be a jockey. The Black surprises Henry with his speed. Henry starts planning to get him into a match race between the country's current two champions. To do that, he sets up a secret demonstration at night where a prominent reporter can witness his speed. The news spreads about the mystery horse, and The Black is entered into the race.

Before the horses enter the starting gate, The Black gets into a fight with one of his opponents, wounding his leg. Alec does not see the injury until he is in the gate. As he begins to dismount, the bell rings, and the horses take off. The Black falls far behind as Alec to slow him but will not stop. Alec starts urging him to run, and The Black catches his opponents to win.

== Cast ==
- Kelly Reno as Alec Ramsay
- Mickey Rooney as Henry Dailey
- Teri Garr as Mrs. Ramsay, Alec's Mother
- Hoyt Axton as Mr. Ramsay, Alec's Father
- Clarence Muse as Snoe
- Michael Higgins as Jim Neville
- Ed McNamara as Jake
- Larbi Doghmi as Arab
- John Burton as Jockey #1
- John Buchanan as Jockey #2
- Kristen Vigard as Becky
- Fausto Tozzi as Rescue Captain
- John Karlsen as Archeologist
- Leopoldo Trieste as Priest
- Frank Cousins as African Chieftain
- Don Hudson as Zaurog
- Marne Maitland as Drake Captain
- Tom Dahlgren as The Veterinarian

== Production ==
"I didn't like the book when it was first presented to me. I thought, 'What is this? Leave It to Beaver?' I wanted to make War and Peace! [...] I wondered for a long time, 'How is it that this book became such a big hit?' Because I was dwelling on the old trainer and the kid talking – stuff I thought was totally predictable. But, there is this thing. I really didn't see it for a long time. There is a mythic element in the book. It's every child's desire to have a powerful friend who can do things and who will make him powerful too. That's what's in this film. It's mythic and in the form of a black horse.

— director Carroll Ballard

Cass Ole, a champion Arabian stallion, was featured in most of the movie's scenes, with Fae Jur, another black Arabian stallion, being his main double. Fae Jur's main scene is the one where Alec is trying to gain the trust of The Black on the beach. Two other stunt doubles were used for running, fighting, and swimming scenes.

El Mokhtar, an Egyptian Arabian racehorse, was the producers' first choice to portray The Black, but they were unable to secure his services for the film from his owners, who declined any offers. He does appear in The Black Stallion Returns, alongside Cass Ole, by which time the studio bought out the syndicate of owners to secure El Mokhtar's services.

Napoleon was portrayed by Junior, that previously appeared in National Lampoon's Animal House as Trooper, Niedermeyer's horse.

== Reception ==
The film was positively received by critics. On Rotten Tomatoes, it holds a 91% approval rating based on 32 reviews, with an average rating of 7.8/10. Metacritic, which uses a weighted average, assigned the film a score of 84 out of 100, based on 10 critics, indicating "universal acclaim".

Janet Maslin of The New York Times praised the "humor and humanity" of Rooney's performance, but otherwise dissented from the critical consensus, finding that Ballard's too-painstaking cinematography came at the expense of storytelling, resulting in a film, that, though based on "a story designed to excite the viewer's imagination and curiosity, instead stifles these feelings by emphasizing the cosmetic value of every frame."

=== Awards and honors ===
| Award | Category | Recipient | Result |
|---|---|---|---|
| Academy Awards | Best Supporting Actor | Mickey Rooney | Nominated |
| Academy Awards | Best Film Editing | Robert Dalva | Nominated |
| Academy Awards | Best Sound Editing (Special Achievement Award) | Alan Splet | Won |
| Golden Globe Awards | Best Original Score | Carmine Coppola | Nominated |
| BAFTA Awards | Best Cinematography | Caleb Deschanel | Nominated |
| Los Angeles Film Critics Association | Best Cinematography | Caleb Deschanel | Won |
| Los Angeles Film Critics Association | Best Music | Carmine Coppola | Won |
| National Society of Film Critics | Best Cinematography | Caleb Deschanel | Won |

In 2002, it was selected for preservation in the United States National Film Registry by the Library of Congress as being "culturally, historically, or aesthetically significant".

The film was also recognized by American Film Institute:

- 2006: AFI's 100 Years...100 Cheers – #64

== Music ==
In August 2009, Intrada Records released a three-disc special edition of the soundtrack containing the entire score from the film plus bonus material, including unused cues and alternate takes of some tracks as well as a restored re-issue of the original 1979 soundtrack album. This release was limited to 1,500 units.

== Home media ==
The film was released on RCA SelectaVision VideoDisc (CED) in 1981. The film was released on Laserdisc and VHS by Magnetic Video in 1985. It was re-issued on VHS as part of the MGM/UA Family Entertainment Collection in 1994 and the MGM Family Entertainment Collection in 1997. The film was released on DVD by MGM Home Entertainment in 2004 and re-issued in 2013. A restored print of the film was released on Blu-ray by 20th Century Fox Home Entertainment in 2013. The Criterion Collection released a special edition of the film on DVD and Blu-ray in 2015. This release features a new 4K transfer supervised by Caleb Deschanel, five short films directed by Carroll Ballard, new interviews with Deschanel, Ballard, film critic Scott Foundas and photographer Mary Ellen Mark as well as an essay written by film critic Michael Sragow.

== Legacy ==
The film was followed in 1983 by a sequel, The Black Stallion Returns, which also starred Kelly Reno and Teri Garr. There was also a television series called The Adventures of the Black Stallion, which aired from 1990 to 1993 and starred Mickey Rooney and Richard Ian Cox. In 2003, a 50-minute prequel called The Young Black Stallion was shot and released for IMAX theaters.

== See also ==
- List of fictional horses
- List of films about horses
- List of films about horse racing
