= Docs Keepin Time =

American Quarter Horse actor

- Breed: American Quarter Horse
- Discipline: Racing; Movies
- Sire: Merridoc
- Dam: Sister Steph
- Maternal grandsire: Timeto Thinkrich
- Sex: Stallion
- Foaled: 1987
- Died: March 15, 2013
- Country: United States
- Color: Black
- Last updated on: July 23, 2013.

Docs Keepin Time (1987 – March 15, 2013) was a black American Quarter Horse who portrayed Black Beauty in the 1994 film adaptation of Anna Sewell's novel. Docs Keepin Time also portrayed The Black in the American television series The Adventures of the Black Stallion.

As a 5th generation offspring of War Admiral, Docs Keepin Time produced many offspring himself. Three of his sons were Samsons Keepin Time, Starrin Doctor Sunny and Keepin Charge. Keepin Charge was featured in the 2008 movie Appaloosa starring Ed Harris and Viggo Mortensen.

== Pedigree ==
Anchor Watch* br 1953
Tiny Watch 1961
Clabber Tiny br 1954
Tinys Gay* br 1972
Rocket Bar* ch 1951
Gays Delight ch 1965
Miss Ginger Gay ch 1959
Merridoc* dk ch 1977
Hy Diamond* ch 1946
Diamond Charge* br 1958
Lovely Lupita br 1949
Sparkling Tip* ch 1966
Spy Song* 1943
Tiptoe Tune ch 1960 Thoroughbred
Apoora ch 1955
DOCS KEEPIN TIME* blk 1987
Intentionally* blk 1956
Aforethought* br 1963 Thoroughbred
Aspidiastra* b 1954
Timeto Thinkrich* br 1971
Tiny Charger* br 1960
Chronometer br 1966
Rhoda Watch br 1961
Sister Steph blk/br 15.2H 1980
The Battler b 1948
Nevada Battler* ch 1960Thoroughbred
Wonderful You ch 1949
Auntie Jo 1969
Lighning Bank* ch 1958
Rita Bank 1962
Rita Girl sor 1951
