= Vincent Spano =

American actor, film director and producer (born 1962)

- Born: Vincent M. Spano Jr. October 18, 1962 (age 63); Brooklyn, New York City, U.S.
- Other name: Vincent Stewart
- Occupations: Actor; film director; producer
- Years active: 1977–present
- Children: 1

Vincent M. Spano Jr. (born October 18, 1962) is an American film, stage, and television actor, and a film director and producer.

== Early life ==
Spano was born in Brooklyn, New York City, to Italian-American parents Vincent Sr. and Theresa.

== Career ==
His career started when he was age 14 in the Broadway drama The Shadow Box. He was originally credited as Vincent Stewart because his first agent felt the name Spano was "too ethnic", and he was even instructed to sign autographs using that stage name. At age 16, out of respect for his Italian heritage, Spano began using his real name and has done so ever since then.

His debut in The Shadow Box was in 1977, first at the Long Wharf Theatre in New Haven, Connecticut and later on Broadway in New York City. Spano's film debut was at the age of 15 in the mystery The Double McGuffin, shot in the winter of 1978. Following The Double McGuffin, he shot Over the Edge in the summer of 1978.

Spano subsequently appeared in the romantic-comedy Baby, It's You (1983), the drama City of Hope (1991), the drama Rumble Fish (1983), the biographical survival drama Alive (1993), the horror television film The Rats (2002), the drama Over the Edge (1979), and the comedy Creator (1985).

In the adventure film The Black Stallion Returns (1983), Spano appeared as a handsome, young, Arabic rider named Raj, who returns home from university to compete in a major horse race and befriends an American boy, Alec Ramsey (Kelly Reno). He also appeared in the Italian drama film Good Morning, Babylon (1987), and the crime drama film Alphabet City (1984). He received a Cable Ace Award nomination in 1988 for his role as Mark Ciuni in Blood Ties (also known as Il cugino americano). He co-starred with Dylan and Cole Sprouse in the comedy film A Modern Twain Story: The Prince and the Pauper (2007). He appeared on ION Television with Lou Diamond Phillips in the Western television film Lone Rider (2008). Spano had a recurring role as FBI Agent Dean Porter on the television series Law & Order: Special Victims Unit since its eighth season in 2006.

In the fantasy horror-thriller film The Prophecy 3: The Ascent (2000), he appeared as Zophael, a handsome angel that was after a young man named Danyeal.

Spano starred in the television movie Landslide (also known as Buried Alive, 2005) as a fireman trapped in a collapsed building with his son.

He has also appeared in Italian projects, including the drama television series L'onore e il rispetto – Parte seconda (2009) in the role of the mafia boss Rodolfo di Venanzio, and the film Caldo Criminale (2010) as Police Inspector Lai. He appeared in the Criminal Minds: Beyond Borders episode "Il Mostro" (2017) as Commissario Galterio Conte.

== Personal life ==
Spano has a son, Aljosha Nakszynski (born June 29, 1984) with Nastassja Kinski, his co-star in Maria's Lovers.

== Filmography ==
- 1979 The Double McGuffin as Foster Amaway
- 1979 Over the Edge as Mark Perry
- 1982 A Stranger Is Watching as Gas Thief
- 1983 Baby It's You as Albert 'Sheik' Capadilupo
- 1983 The Black Stallion Returns as Raj
- 1983 Rumble Fish as Steve
- 1984 Alphabet City as Johnny
- 1984 Maria's Lovers as Al Griselli
- 1985 Creator as Boris Lafkin
- 1986 Blood Ties (also known as Il cugino americano) as Mark Ciuni
- 1987 Good Morning, Babylon as Nicola Bonanno
- 1988 High Frequency (aka Qualcuno in ascolto) as Peter
- 1988 And God Created Woman as Billy Moran
- 1989 Rosso veneziano as Carlo Goldoni
- 1990 Heart of the Deal as Mitchell Bryce
- 1991 Oscar as Anthony Rossano
- 1991 City of Hope as Nick Rinaldi
- 1993 Alive as Antonio Balbi
- 1993 Indian Summer as Matthew Berman
- 1994 The Ascent as Franco Distassi
- 1995 The Tie That Binds as Russell Clifton
- 1997 No Strings Attached as Marc Demetrius
- 1997 A Brooklyn State of Mind as Al Stanco
- 1998 The Christmas Path as Angel
- 1998 The Unknown Cyclist as Frank Cavatelli
- 1999 Goosed as Steven Binder
- 2000 The Prophecy 3: The Ascent as Zophael
- 2001 Texas Rangers as Ed Simms
- 2003 Silence as Detective Steve Banks
- 2005 The Engagement Ring as Tony Di Cenzo
- 2007 Nevermore as Devin Bayliss
- 2007 A Modern Twain Story: The Prince and the Pauper as Miles
- 2009 Fatal Secrets as Scott
- 2010 Dante's Inferno: Abandon All Hope as Speaker: 7th Circle – The Murderers
- 2011 Sangue Caldo as Mauro Malaspina
- 2011 Dante's Inferno Animated as Virgil (voice)
- 2012 Dante's Inferno Documented as Speaker, Virgil
- 2013 Dante's Purgatorio Documented as Virgil
- 2013 This Magic Moment (TV Movie) as Roberto Molinez
- 2014 Dante's Hell Animated (Short) as Virgil
- 2014 April Rain as Special Agent Thomas
- 2015 Pearly Gates as Mayor / Satan
- 2015 Badlanders as Prussian Mercenary
- 2018 Bent as Charlie Horvath
- 2020 The Comeback Trail as Joey
- 2020 Half Brothers as Mr. B.
- 2024 The Contract

=== Television work ===
- 1979 Search for Tomorrow as Jackie Peterson
- 1981 The Gentleman Bandit as Angel Perez
- 1980 Senior Trip as Dick
- 1992 Afterburn as Ted Harduvel
- 1993 Environmental Media Awards as Himself
- 1993 Tales from the Crypt (one episode) as Officer Fine
- 1996 Downdraft as Jack
- 1997 Medusa’s Child as Scott Nash
- 1997-2000 Prince Street (six episodes) as Detective Alex Gage
- The Deadly Look of Love as Brett Becker
- 2001 Jenifer as Jack
- 2002 The Rats as Jack Carver
- 2003 Deathlands: Homeward Bound as Ryan Cawdor
- 2004 North Shore (two episodes) as Dan Ralston
- 2005 Landslide as Mark Decker
- 2005 The Engagement Ring as Tony Di Cenzo
- 2006 Her Fatal Flaw as Robert Genaro
- 2007 Pandemic as Troy Whitlock
- 2008 Lone Rider as Stu Croker
- 2008 Grave Misconduct as Trent Dodson
- 2006-2009 Law & Order: Special Victims Unit (five episodes) as FBI Agent Dean Porter
- 2009 L'onore e il rispetto as Rodolfo Di Venenzio
- 2010 Caldo criminale as Ispettore Lai
- 2011 House M.D. (episode "Perils of Paranoia") as Tommy
- 2014 The Mentalist (one episode) as Don De Jorio
- 2014 Castle (one episode) as Christopher Carlucci
- 2017 Criminal Minds: Beyond Borders (one episode) as Commissario Galterio Conte

=== Directing ===
Short films:

- 2002 Tony & Bobby
- 2002 High Expectations
- 2003 Bet Runner
- 2004 Me and My Daddy

== Awards ==
| Year | Group | Award | Result | Notes |
|---|---|---|---|---|
| 1988 | CableACE Awards | Actor in a Movie or Miniseries | Il cugino americano | Nominated |

== See also ==
- List of former child actors from the United States
- List of film directors
- List of Italian-American actors
- List of people from Brooklyn, New York
