= City of Hope (1991 film) =

1991 film by John Sayles

- Theatrical release poster
- Directed by: John Sayles
- Screenplay by: John Sayles
- Produced by: Harold Welb; John Sloss
- Starring: Vincent Spano; Tony Lo Bianco; Joe Morton; Todd Graff; David Strathairn; Anthony John Denison; Barbara Williams; Angela Bassett; Gloria Foster; Lawrence Tierney
- Cinematography: Robert Richardson
- Edited by: John Sayles
- Music by: Mason Daring
- Production companies: Esperanza Films; The Samuel Goldwyn Company
- Distributed by: Esperanza Films; The Samuel Goldwyn Company
- Release dates: October 11, 1991 (Boston New York City); Los Angeles 10-25-1991
- Running time: 129 minutes
- Country: United States
- Language: English
- Budget: $3 million
- Box office: $1.3 million (US).

City of Hope is a 1991 American drama film written, directed, and edited by John Sayles. The film features Vincent Spano, Stephen Mendillo, and Chris Cooper.

== Plot ==
Set in a fictional New Jersey city, the film centers on Nick Rinaldi, the aimless son of corrupt property developer Joe Rinaldi. The elder Rinaldi owns a derelict apartment that is blocking the construction of a mixed-use development sought after by the equally corrupt mayor in order to boost his re-election chances. Bored at the no-show job organized by his father, Nick quits and turns to crime to support his debts and drug addiction. Joe is introduced arguing with idealistic black alderman Wynn about hiring more black workers, which Rinaldi is hesitant to do for political reasons. Nick joins his friends, low-rent thugs Bobby and Zip, on a break-in at a local electronics store set up by Carl, an older small-time criminal. Unbeknownst to the men, the owner is a close friend of Joe's. While breaking into the store, they are thwarted by the store's new security guard (Wynn's brother-in-law), who threatens to shoot them despite his gun being fake. Bobby and Zip are arrested while Nick flees, leaving the pair to sit in jail, annoyed by delusional homeless man Asteroid. Nick begins to fall for Angela, a waitress at a local restaurant, who is a single mother divorced from her husband, a short-tempered young policeman named Rizzo. Rizzo, who stalks his ex-wife, is infuriated that Rinaldi is pursuing Angela.

Elsewhere, two young black boys are hassled by two patrol officers and decide that they may as well live up to the way the police portray them. They attack a professor jogging in a nearby park, later falsely claiming that the professor made advances toward them. Wynn privately expresses doubt in the story of the boys, but worries about his perception from the black community, especially the more radical elements, if he does not stand with the boys.

Carl later reveals Nick's involvement in the botched robbery to Joe, promising that he will get the police to drop Nick's arrest warrant if Joe will allow one of Carl's henchmen to set fire to the abandoned apartment building. Joe's relationship with Nick also takes a sour turn when Nick learns that his older brother, who died in Vietnam, was deployed there as an alternative to prison for injuring a young woman as a result of a DUI while joyriding.

Community organizers rope Wynn into defending the stories of the boys that attacked the jogger. Wynn realizes that the accused pedophile is one of his old college professors, and visits him privately to encourage him to drop the charges as they will be linked to his name if he goes public. Carl's henchman torches Joe's apartment building, but Joe quickly realizes that the plan has gone awry as a young Hispanic woman and her baby, squatting in a part of the building thought by Joe to be abandoned, perish in the blaze. Wynn visits Desmond, one of the young boys involved in the jogger attack, and learns that the boys were lying. However, before he can act, the black community center reports that the professor agreed to drop the charges against the boys.

Wynn, now fully embracing the city's ethos, leads a contingent of the black and Hispanic communities to disrupt a fundraising dinner for the mayor. Desmond, one of the boys from the park, visits the home of the professor they attacked, claiming he saw his address in the police report. The professor initially brushes him away, but Desmond apologizes for what happened and asks if he can accompany the man on a run, discovering that he is a professor of urban relations.

Nick runs into a drunken Rizzo, who confronts Nick, shooting at him after the two men get into a scuffle. Rizzo's old patrol partner picks him up, and the new trainee, a Hispanic man, inquires whether Rizzo's gun is legal. After the new officer refuses to overlook Rizzo's illegal conduct, Rizzo grows angry as the car drives off. Joe finds Nick in the new property development, severely wounded. Joe calls for help, but the only person who hears his cries is Asteroid, who repeats them frantically to an empty street.

== Cast ==
- Vincent Spano as Nick Rinaldi
- Barbara Williams as Angela
- Stephen Mendillo as Yoyo
- Chris Cooper as Riggs
- Tony Lo Bianco as Joe Rinaldi
- Joe Morton as Wynn
- Jace Alexander as Bobby
- Todd Graff as Zip
- John Sayles as Carl
- Frankie Faison as Levonne
- Gloria Foster as Jeanette
- Tom Wright as Malik
- Angela Bassett as Reesha
- David Strathairn as Asteroid
- Gina Gershon as Laurie Rinaldi
- Maggie Renzi as Connie
- Tony Denison as Rizzo
- Daryl Edwards as Franklin

== Production ==
Sayles filmed the movie in the Over-the-Rhine neighborhood of Cincinnati.

== Reception ==
=== Critical response ===
Film critic Roger Ebert wrote, "City of Hope is a powerful film, and an angry one. It is impossible not to find echoes of its despair on the front pages every day. It asks a hard question: Is it possible for a good person to prevail in a corrupt system, just simply because right is on his side? The answer, in the short run, is that power is stronger than right. The notion of a long run, of course, is all that keeps hope alive."

The staff at Variety magazine wrote, "John Sayles' ambitious, wide-ranging study of corruption and community in a small Eastern city has as many parallel plots and characters as Hill Street Blues, while at the same time having a richness of theme and specificity of vision more common to serious cinema."

Film critics Frederic and Mary Ann Brussat wrote about the varied aspects of the film, writing, "Through the diverse activities of over three dozen characters in this film, we see some of the major challenges of urban living including crime, political chicanery, the patronage system, the demise of the work ethic, the rapacious side of capitalism, and the high cost of civic apathy. City of Hope helps us see that community is enriched or torn apart by the ethical decisions we make every day."

The film holds a 95% on review aggregation site Rotten Tomatoes, based on 19 reviews.

=== Accolades ===
Wins

- Tokyo International Film Festival: Tokyo Grand Prix; John Sayles; 1991.
- Political Film Society: PFS Award Democracy and Special Award; 1992.
- Kansas City Film Critics Circle Awards: KCFCC Award; Best Screenplay, John Sayles; 1992.
- Independent Spirit Awards: Independent Spirit Award; Best Supporting Male, David Strathairn; 1992.

Nominations

- Belgian Syndicate of Cinema Critics; Grand Prix; 1994.
- Deauville Film Festival: Critics Award; John Sayles; 1991.
- Independent Spirit Awards: Independent Spirit Award; Best Feature, Sarah Green and Maggie Renzi; 1992.
