= Tony Lo Bianco =

American actor (1936–2024)

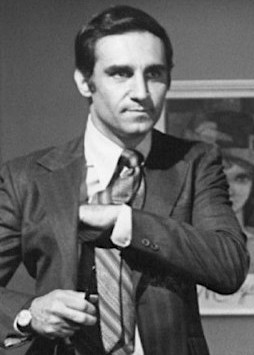
- Lo Bianco in Police Story, 1975
- Born: Anthony LoBianco; October 19, 1936; New York City, New York, U.S.
- Died: June 11, 2024 (aged 87); Poolesville, Maryland, U.S.
- Occupation: Actor
- Years active: 1951–2022
- Spouses: Dora Landey (m. 1964; div. 1984); Elizabeth Fitzpatrick (m. 2002; div. 2008); Alyse Muldoon (m. 2015)
- Children: 3
- Website: tonylobianco.com

Anthony LoBianco (October 19, 1936 – June 11, 2024) was an American actor.

Born to first-generation Italian American parents in New York City, Lo Bianco began his career in theater, appearing in several Broadway productions throughout the 1960s. He transitioned to film in the 1970s, starring in the New Hollywood crime films The Honeymoon Killers (1970), The French Connection (1971), and The Seven-Ups (1973).

He won an Obie Award for his 1975 role in an Off-Broadway production of Yanks-3, Detroit-0, Top of the Seventh, and subsequently earned a Tony Award nomination for Best Actor for his role as Eddie in the 1983 Broadway revival of Arthur Miller's 1955 play A View from the Bridge.

In addition to film and theater, Lo Bianco appeared as a guest-star on numerous television series throughout the 1970s and 1980s, including appearances on Police Story (1974–1976), Franco Zeffirelli's miniseries Jesus of Nazareth (1977), and Marco Polo (1982).

In 1984, he appeared in a stage production of Hizzoner!, playing New York politician Fiorello H. La Guardia, for which he won a New York Emmy Award. The one-man play was subsequently staged on Broadway in 1989, and Lo Bianco went on to perform several other Off-Broadway iterations of it, including LaGuardia (2008) and The Little Flower (2012–2015).

== Early life ==
The grandson of Sicilian immigrants, Anthony LoBianco was born October 19, 1936, in Brooklyn, New York, the son of a housewife mother and a taxi driver father. He attended the William E. Grady CTE High School, a vocational school in Brooklyn. There, he had a teacher who encouraged him to try out for plays, which is when he began to develop an interest in acting. After graduating high school, he attended the Dramatic Workshop, studying acting and theater production.

== Career ==
Lo Bianco was a contending Golden Gloves boxer and also founded the Triangle Theatre in 1963, serving as its artistic director for six years and collaborating with lighting designer Jules Fisher, playwright Jason Miller and actor Roy Scheider. He performed as an understudy in a 1964 Broadway production of Incident at Vichy, and the following year had a supporting role in a Broadway production of Tartuffe. From late 1965 through the spring of 1966, he starred on Broadway as Fray Marcos de Nizza in The Royal Hunt of the Sun.

He made his film debut in The Sex Perils of Paulette (1965) before appearing as a murderer in the semi-biographical crime film The Honeymoon Killers (1970). He subsequently appeared as Salvatore Boca in William Friedkin's critically acclaimed action film The French Connection (1971), and later starred as a police officer investigating a series of murders in Larry Cohen's horror film God Told Me To (1976). From 1974–76, he played a lead role in six episodes of Joseph Wambaugh's anthology television series Police Story in the mid-1970s, four times alongside former NFL star quarterback Don Meredith. He also appeared in several Italian films, including the Lee Van Cleef-starring crime comedy Mean Frank and Crazy Tony (1973).

In 1975, Lo Bianco won an Obie Award for his off-Broadway performance as Duke Bronkowski in the baseball-themed play Yanks-3, Detroit-0, Top of the Seventh. In 1983, Lo Bianco was nominated for a Tony Award for his portrayal of Eddie Carbone in Arthur Miller's A View from the Bridge. He also won the 1983 Outer Critics Circle Award for this performance. In 1984, he had a supporting role in the action comedy City Heat.

Lo Bianco first portrayed the larger-than-life mayor of New York City from 1933 to 1945, Fiorello H. La Guardia, in the one-man show Hizzoner!, written in 1984 by Paul Shyre. Lo Bianco won a local Daytime Emmy Award for the WNET Public Television version of the play, which was filmed at the Empire State Institute for the Performing Arts in Albany. The play was subsequently staged on Broadway in 1989, where it ran for just 12 performances. Lo Bianco appeared in several independent films in the 1990s: in 1995 as Jimmy Jacobs in the HBO biographical film Tyson, in 1996 as Briggs in Sworn to Justice with Cynthia Rothrock. He had a minor role in Nixon, directed by Oliver Stone.

Lo Bianco continued his work on the life of LaGuardia in a revised revival of the play in 2008, titled LaGuardia. His third incarnation of the mayor's life had a limited run off-Broadway in October 2012, titled The Little Flower. Lo Bianco purchased the rights to the play from the estate of Paul Shyre and rewrote it a few times. He viewed the play as "a vehicle to express my concerns for the public and political mess that we're in, which we continue to be in, I think, and try to relate answers to failure." He performed it in Moscow in 1991 shortly before the fall of the Soviet Union, and in 2015 he was scheduled to perform it in Italy. The show was staged at LaGuardia Community College in May 2015.

A New York Times profile in 2015 reported that Lo Bianco was at work on a one-man show playing himself and a film script about his early life.

== Personal life ==
Lo Bianco was previously the national spokesperson for the Order Sons of Italy in America. His humanitarian efforts earned multiple awards, including Man of the Year for Outstanding Contributions to the Italian-American Community from the Police Society of New Jersey; a Man of the Year Award from the State of New Jersey Senate; a Lifetime Entertainment Award from the Columbus Day Parade Committee; the 1997 Golden Lion Award; and a Humanitarian Award of the Boys' Town of Italy.

Lo Bianco was married from 1964 until 1984 to Dora Landey. They had three daughters. He was married to Elizabeth Fitzpatrick from 2002 until 2008. He was then married to Alyse Best Muldoon since June 2015 until his death.

Lo Bianco was an avid cat lover and owned a Siamese cat named Simone, as well as various horses and dogs. Later in his life, when his psychiatrist asked him to imagine the most relaxing thing he could think of, Lo Bianco imagined a cat sitting on his wife Alyse's lap.

== Death ==
Lo Bianco died as a result of prostate cancer at his farm in Poolesville, Maryland, on June 11, 2024, at the age of 87.

== Filmography ==
=== Film ===
Year	Title	Role	Notes	Ref.
1965	The Sex Perils of Paulette	Allen		
1970	The Honeymoon Killers	Ray Fernandez		
1971	The French Connection	Salvatore Boca		
1973	Mean Frank and Crazy Tony	Tony Breda		
1973	Serpico	Rizzo	Uncredited	
1973	The Seven-Ups	Vito Lucia		
1976	Goldenrod	Jesse Gifford		
1976	God Told Me To	Peter J. Nicholas		
1976	Merciless Man	The American		
1978	F.I.S.T.	Anthony 'Babe' Milano		
1978	Bloodbrothers	Tommy De Coco		
1981	Pals	Frank Green	Short film	
1981	Separate Ways	Ken Colby		
1983	Another Woman's Child	Mike DeBray		
1984	City Heat	Leon Coll		
1991	City of Hope	Joe Rinaldi		
1991	The Good Policeman	Jerry Diangelis		
1993	Boiling Point	Tony Dio		
1994	La ragnatela del silenzio - A.I.D.S.	Professor Donati		
1994	The Ascent	Aldo		
1994	Power and Lovers	Warren		
1995	Nixon	Johnny Roselli		
1996	The Juror	Louie Boffano		
1996	Sworn to Justice	Briggs		
1997	Cold Night Into Dawn	Supervisor Klyn		
1998	Mafia!	Cesar Marzoni		
1998	The Pawn	Lou		
2000	The Day the Ponies Come Back	Paul DeCruccio		
2001	Friends & Family	Victor Patrizzi		
2001	Down 'n Dirty	Detective Dan Ward		
2002	Endangered Species	Captain Tanzini		
2003	The Cruelest Day	General Loi		
2006	The Last Request	Monte		
2009	Frame of Mind	'Mouthman'		
2011	Kill the Irishman	Jack White		
2013	Send No Flowers	Anthony Albano		
2016	'79 Parts	Vincent		
2016	Blondie	Johnny	Short film	
2022	Somewhere in Queens	Dominic "Pops" Russo	Final film role	

=== Television ===
Year	Title	Role	Notes	Ref.
1966	Get Smart	KAOS Agent	Episode: "Smart, the Assassin"	
1966	Blue Light	Carbonne	Episode: "Jet Trial"	
1966	Hawk	Joey Fentanello	Episode: ""H" is a Dirty Letter"	
1968	N.Y.P.D.	Muller / Joe Peconic	2 episodes	
1968	Hidden Faces	Nick Capello Turner	Miniseries	
1971	Great Performances	Frank	Episode: "A Memory of Two Mondays"	
1972	Madigan	Joe Lakka	Episode: "The Manhattan Beat"	
1973	Mr. Inside/Mr. Outside	Detective Rick Massi	Television film	
1974	The Story of Jacob and Joseph	Joseph	Television film	
1974–76	Police Story	D.J. Perkins / Sgt. Tony Calabrese	6 episodes	
1975	The Streets of San Francisco	Al Wozynsky	Episode: "Solitaire"	
1975	A Shadow in the Streets	Pete Mackey	Television film	
1976	Origins of the Mafia	Nino Sciallacca	Episode: "Omertà"	
1977	Jesus of Nazareth	Quintilius	Miniseries	
1978	The Last Tenant	Joey	Television film	
1978	She'll Be Sweet	Magee	Television film	
1979	Champions: A Love Story	Alan Denschroeder	Television film	
1979	A Last Cry for Help	Dr. Ben Abbot	Television film	
1979	Marciano	Rocky Marciano	Television film	
1981	Today's FBI	Joey D'Amico	Episode: "The Bureau"	
1982	Marco Polo	Brother Nicolas	Miniseries	
1984	Hizzoner!	Fiorello La Guardia	Television film	
1984	Jessie	Lieutenant Alex Ascoli	Television film	
1984	The Paper Chase	Professor Reese	Episode: "The Advocates"	
1984	Jessie	Lieutenant Alex Ascoli	10 episodes	
1985	Lady Blue	Sergeant 'Bing' Bingham	Episode: "Pilot"	
1985	The Twilight Zone	Paul Marano	Episode: "If She Dies"	
1986	Blood Ties	Judge Guiliano Salina	Television film	
1987	Night Heat	Tony Rimbaud	Episode: "Flashback"	
1987	Police Story: The Freeway Killings	Detective DiAngelo	Television film	
1988	CBS Summer Playhouse	Tom 'Coop' Cooper	Episode: "Off Duty"	
1988	La romana	Astarita	Miniseries	
1988	Body of Evidence	Evan Campbell	Television film	
1988	The Ann Jillian Story	Andy Murcia	Television film	
1989	True Blue	'Doc'	Episode: "Pilot"	
1990	Perry Mason: The Case of the Poisoned Pen	Michael Garcia	Television film	
1990	Death Has a Bad Reputation	Carlos	Television film	
1990	ABC Afterschool Special	Officer Abbott	Episode: "Over the Limit"	
1990	CBS Schoolbreak Special	Coach Douglas	Episode: "Malcolm Takes the Shot"	
1991	Palace Guard	Arturo Taft	8 episodes	
1991	The 10 Million Dollar Getaway	Tony 'Ducks' Corallo	Television film	
1991–94	Murder, She Wrote	Paul Avoncino / Phil Mannix	2 episodes	
1992	In the Shadow of a Killer	Frederick Berger	Television film	
1992	Stormy Weathers	Lieutenant Frank Orozco	Television film	
1992	Teamster Boss: The Jackie Presser Story	Allen Dorfman	Television film	
1992–2002	Law & Order	Mark Menaker / Sal DiMarco / Det. Mike Foster	3 episodes	
1994	The Maharaja's Daughter	Vito Capece	Miniseries	
1995	Homicide: Life on the Street	Mitch Drummond	3 episodes	
1995	Tyson	Jimmy Jacobs	Television film	
1997	F/X: The Series	Martin Thorne	Episode: "Reunion"	
1997	Let Me Call You Sweetheart	Dr. Charles Smith	Television film	
1997	Bella Mafia	Pietro Carolla	Television film	
1999	Rocky Marciano	Frankie Carbo	Television film	
2001	Walker, Texas Ranger	Tony Ferelli	Episode: "Saturday Night"	
2001	Deadline	Rosario Masucci	Episode: "Don't I Know You?"	
2002	Lucky Day	Detective Marinello	Television film	
2005	The Engagement Ring	Nick Di Cenzo		
2005	N.Y.-70	Congressman Fario Cardinale		
2007	Law & Order: Criminal Intent	Joseph	Episode: "World's Fair"	

== Partial stage credits ==
Year	Title	Role	Original venue	Notes	Ref.
1964–65	Incident at Vichy	Prisoner	ANTA Washington Square Theatre	Understudy	
1965	Tartuffe	Sergeant	ANTA Washington Square Theatre	ANTA Washington Square Theatre	
1965–66	The Royal Hunt of the Sun	Fray Marcos de Niza	ANTA Playhouse		
1966	The Office	Gucci		10 previews; never officially opened	
1967	The Ninety Day Mistress	Rudy Avarian	Biltmore Theatre		
1968	The Exercise	The Actor	John Golden Theatre		
1968	The Goodbye People	Michael Silverman	Ethel Barrymore Theatre		
1975	Yanks-3, Detroit-0, Top of the Seventh	Duke Bronkowski	The American Place Theatre		
1983	A View from the Bridge	Eddie	Ambassador Theatre		
1989	Hizzoner!	Fiorello La Guardia	Longacre Theatre		
2008	LaGuardia	Fiorello La Guardia	DiCapo Opera Theater		
2012	The Little Flower	Fiorello La Guardia	DiCapo Opera Theater		
2015	The Little Flower	Fiorello La Guardia			

== Awards and nominations ==
Award	Year	Category	Work	Result	Ref.
New York Emmy Award	1985	Outstanding Individual Crafts	Hizzoner!	Won	
Obie Award	1975	Distinguished Performance by an Actor	Yanks-3, Detroit-0, Top of the Seventh	Won	
Outer Critics Circle Awards	1983	Outstanding Actor in a Play	A View from the Bridge	Won	
Tony Award	1983	Best Actor in a Play	A View from the Bridge	Nominated	
Williamsburg Brooklyn Film Festival	2011	Audience Award - Short Film	Lily of the Feast	Won	
