= Lone Rider =

2000 TV film

- Written by: Frank Sharp
- Directed by: David S. Cass Sr.
- Starring: Lou Diamond Phillips; Stacy Keach; Vincent Spano
- Music by: Joe Kraemer
- Country of origin: United States
- Original language: English

Production
- Producer: Albert T. Dickerson III
- Cinematography: James W. Wrenn
- Editor: Tricia Gorman
- Production company: Grand Army Entertainment

Original release
- Release: April 12, 2008

Lone Rider is a 2008 American Western television film. It was directed by David S. Cass Sr. and stars Lou Diamond Phillips and Stacy Keach.

== Plot ==
Bobby Hattaway (Lou Diamond Phillips), an honored soldier, returns home after the American Civil War to find his father's (Stacy Keach) formerly prosperous store now dangerously in debt to the town's ruthless leader, and Bobby's childhood friend, Stu Croker (Vincent Spano). Bobby will now face off against his former friend to take control from Stu.

== Cast ==
- Lou Diamond Phillips as Bobby Hattaway
- Stacy Keach as Robert Hattaway
- Vincent Spano as Stu Croker
- Mike Starr as Lloyd
- Marta DuBois as Dora
- Terry Maratos as Curtis
- Cynthia Preston as Constance Croker
- Angela Alvarado as Serena (as Angela Alvarado Rosa)
- Robert Baker as Vic
- Timothy Bottoms as Gus
- Ann Walker as Irene
- Tom Schanley as Mike Butle
- Maria Jordan as Saloon Girl
- Nygell as Townfolk
- Jimmy Ortega as Rough Rider #4
