= Brady's Escape =

- Hungarian: Hosszu vágta
- Directed by: Pál Gábor
- Written by: Pál Gábor, William W. Lewis
- Produced by: Robert Halmi Jr.
- Starring: John Savage, Kelly Reno, Ildiko Bansagi
- Cinematography: Elemér Ragályi
- Edited by: Norman Gay
- Music by: Charles Gross
- Production company: Satori Entertainment
- Release date: 1983
- Running time: 96 minutes
- Country: Hungary
- Languages: English, Hungarian, German

Brady's Escape (Hungarian: Hosszu vágta) is a Hungary-United States co-produced war film, written and directed by Pál Gábor. It was released in 1983 under several different titles: Hosszú vágta (Long Gallop) in Hungary, Brady's Escape in the US (1984) and The Long Ride in all other English-speaking territories.

It stars John Savage as an Air Force pilot shot down over German-controlled Hungary during World War II, and Kelly Reno as a cowboy-idolizing teenager who teams up with him.

== Home video ==
As of February 2020, the film has only been released internationally on VHS under various titles and in the US on VHS, CED, and LaserDisc as Brady's Escape.
