= The Young Black Stallion =

2003 film by Simon Wincer

- Theatrical release poster
- Directed by: Simon Wincer
- Screenplay by: Jeanne Rosenberg
- Story by: Jeanne Rosenberg
- Based on: The Young Black Stallion by Walter Farley & Steven Farley
- Produced by: Fred Roos; Frank Marshall
- Starring: Richard Romanus; Biana G. Tamimi; Patrick Elyas
- Cinematography: Reed Smoot
- Edited by: Bud Smith; Terry Blythe
- Music by: William Ross
- Production companies: Walt Disney Pictures; The Kennedy/Marshall Company
- Distributed by: Buena Vista Pictures Distribution
- Release date: December 25, 2003
- Running time: 50 minutes
- Country: United States
- Language: English
- Box office: $9.6 million

The Young Black Stallion is a 2003 American drama film produced by Walt Disney Pictures. Directed by Simon Wincer, the film is based on the 1989 novel of the same name by Black Stallion creator Walter Farley and his son Steven Farley.

Noted for its beautiful scenery and wide-angle shots, the 50-minute film was shot on-location in the deserts of Namibia and South Africa. The film stars Biana G. Tamimi as Neera, a young girl who befriends a young black stallion, and Patrick Elyas as Aden, although his voice was dubbed by Eric Grucza, who, for his uncredited performance, was nominated in 2004 for a Young Artist Award for Best Performance in a Voice-Over Role.

The film is Disney’s first production made specifically for IMAX theaters, and a prequel to United Artists/Ford Coppola's award winning 1979 film The Black Stallion. Originally scheduled for fall 2002, it was postponed until September 2003, before debuting in select IMAX theaters in the United States on December 25, 2003.

== Plot ==
The film follows the adventures of Shetan, a young black Arabian colt. After a band of robbers separates a young Arabian girl named Neera from her father, she finds herself alone in the desert. Before too long, a mysterious black colt comes to her rescue. The two quickly form a special bond, and the horse returns Neera to her grandfather. Once Neera is back home, the stallion disappears.

Neera greets her grandfather Ben Ishak and her cousin Aden eagerly, but is disappointed and upset when she find out that her grandfather's horse breeding days are over. Ben Ishak informs Neera that because of the shootings in the desert, his fields are ruined, and he can no longer afford to keep any of his horses. He kept an old plow-horse, Abha, and set his most precious mare Jinah free. We find out later that Jinah was Shetan's mother.

A year passes, but the black stallion does not return. Neera’s grandfather tells her that the horse was probably nothing more than a product of her imagination. But Neera knows better. She thinks the stallion is the lost horse of the desert, a legend born of the sands and sired by the night sky. Then, one night, the colt appears again. In an attempt to help her grandfather start a breeding farm again, Neera joins a grueling cross-country race against the finest horses of Arabia for a purse of the most exceptional Arabian mares. Shetan, the black stallion, is trained, and Neera rides him in the competition to restore her grandfather's money and respect. In the end, Neera wins, and Shetan is reunited with his mother.

== Cast ==
- Richard Romanus as Ben Ishak
- Biana G. Tamimi as Neera
- Patrick Elyas as Aden
- Gérard Rudolf as Rhamon
- Ali Al Ameri as Mansoor
- Andries Rossouw as Kadir

== Critical reception ==
Critical reception was mixed. Gene Seymour of Newsday commented: "The new giant screen contribution to the stallion's legend is a 45-minute story, which, at best, plays as if it could have barely passed muster as an installment of the old 1960s Disney TV series, The Wonderful World of Color". Megan Lehmann of the New York Post wrote that the film, as a visual treat, is diminished by lifeless dialogue and self-conscious acting.

== See also ==
- List of films about horses
