= Blood Ties (1986 film) =

- Written by: Corrado Augias; Giacomo Battiato
- Directed by: Giacomo Battiato
- Starring: Brad Davis; Tony Lo Bianco; Vincent Spano; Barbara De Rossi
- Music by: Celso Valli
- Country of origin: United States
- Original language: Italian

Production
- Cinematography: Romano Albani
- Editor: Mario Morra

Original release
- Network: Showtime
- Release: December 14, 1986

Blood Ties, also known as Il cugino americano, which translates from the Italian as The American Cousin, is a 1986 Italian-American television film directed by Giacomo Battiato. It was shown at the 43rd Venice International Film Festival, where it was awarded as best television production.

The film is produced by RAI, Showtime and Viacom International. It was shot in Palermo and New York City with a budget of about US$5 million.

The film was broadcast by Showtime on December 14, 1986.

== Cast ==
- Brad Davis as Julian Salina
- Tony Lo Bianco as Judge Guiliano Salina
- Vincent Spano as Mark Ciuni
- Barbara De Rossi as Louisa Masseria
- Arnoldo Foà as Vincenzo Ammirati
- Angelo Infanti as Romano
- Delia Boccardo as Sara Salina
- Ricky Tognazzi as Riccardo
- Michael V. Gazzo as Joseph Salina
- María Conchita Alonso as Caterina Ammirati
- Joe Spinell as Joey, New York Goon
- Elio Zamuto
