= The Tie That Binds (1995 film) =

- Directed by: Wesley Strick
- Written by: Michael Auerbach
- Produced by: David Madden; Patrick Markey; John Morrissey; Susan Zachary
- Starring: Daryl Hannah; Keith Carradine; Moira Kelly; Vincent Spano
- Cinematography: Bobby Bukowski
- Music by: Graeme Revell
- Production companies: Hollywood Pictures; Interscope Communications; PolyGram Filmed Entertainment
- Distributed by: Buena Vista Pictures Distribution (United States and Canada); PolyGram Filmed Entertainment (International)
- Release date: September 8, 1995
- Running time: 98 minutes
- Country: United States
- Language: English
- Budget: $14 million
- Box office: $5.8 million (domestic)

The Tie That Binds is a 1995 psychological thriller film directed by screenwriter Wesley Strick, in his directorial debut, starring Daryl Hannah, Keith Carradine, Vincent Spano, Moira Kelly and Julia Devin. The film follows a couple who have just adopted a 6-year-old girl, only to discover that her biological parents, a murderous couple, are trying to reclaim her.

Released in the United States on September 8, 1995, The Tie That Binds was unsuccessful at the box office and received negative critical reviews. At the 17th annual Young Artist Awards in 1996, Julia Devin was nominated for Best Young Supporting Actress - Feature Film, but lost out to Kristy Young in Gordy.

== Plot ==
John Netherwood and his wife Leann are murderers and fugitives on the run with their young daughter, Janie. While robbing a house to feed Janie, the two are interrupted by the arrival of the elderly residents, whom John terrorizes and photographs with a Polaroid camera before killing them. However, a suspicious neighbor calls the police, and Officer David Carrey arrives on the scene, shooting John in the shoulder and forcing him to flee with Leann. Janie is taken into an adoption agency, deeply traumatized by her experiences with her parents.

Helped by adoption agency case worker Maggie Hass, Los Angeles architect Russell Clifton and his photographer wife Dana adopt Janie and bring her into their home. Despite being precocious and charming, Janie's mental trauma begins to manifest itself in disturbing ways; she hides in the Cliftons' closet, has nightmares about her parents, and cuts herself with a bread knife she keeps under her pillow. She tells a child psychologist that the knife is meant to protect her from the "Tooth Fairy", whom she draws as an image of John.

Meanwhile, the Netherwoods begin planning to reclaim Janie. Leann picks up Officer Carrey at a bar, and when he takes her back to his home, John appears and brutally beats him; after getting the name of the adoption agency from him, they kill him. The Netherwoods then arrive at the adoption center and interrogate Maggie before killing her as well. Meanwhile, the Cliftons discover the identity of Janie's parents from a police database search. After Leann tries but fails to kidnap Janie from school, the Cliftons are forced to go into hiding with Janie.

The Netherwoods track down the Cliftons' friends, Lisa Marie Chandler and her husband Gil Chandler, to the hospital where Lisa Marie has just given birth. Leann threatens to harm Lisa Marie's child, forcing her to tell them where the Cliftons have fled to—an unfinished house that Russell has designed for his family and financed out of his own pocket.

The Netherwoods head to the site of the house and take the Cliftons hostage, tying them both to makeshift gallows. Leann tries to distract a terrified Janie while John sets the house on fire, just as he did to a previous set of victims. However, Janie, seeing Dana in danger, intervenes and struggles with John as Russell manages to cut himself and Dana free. In the chaos, Janie and Dana escape, and Leann pursues them while John fights with and incapacitates Russell. Leann manages to find Janie and Dana, but finds herself unable to take Janie back upon seeing Dana cradling her in her arms. John finds Leann, who tells him that he has already lost his daughter to Dana; in a fit of rage, John kills her and chases Janie into the nearby woods.

John and Janie eventually come face-to-face in the woods, but when he tries to take her back, she stabs him in the stomach with her bread knife, telling him, "You taught me that." At that moment, Dana appears and grabs Janie. An enraged John, realizing that Janie will never accept him, tries to kill her and Dana, but a badly-beaten Russell appears with an axe and kills him. With the Netherwoods dead, Janie finally accepts the Cliftons as her new family.

== Cast ==
- Daryl Hannah as Leann Netherwood
- Keith Carradine as John Netherwood
- Vincent Spano as Russell Clifton
- Moira Kelly as Dana Clifton
- Julia Devin as Janie
- Bruce A. Young as Gil Chandler
- Cynda Williams as Lisa Marie Chandler
- Ray Reinhardt as Sam Bennett
- Barbara Tarbuck as Jean Bennett
- Carmen Argenziano as Phil Hawkes
- Jenny Gago as Maggie Hass
- Ned Vaughn as Officer David Carrey
- George Marshall Ruge as Detective Frank Mercer

== Reception ==
The Tie That Binds was heavily panned by critics—particularly Leonard Maltin, who called it "...sleazy, insultingly derivative, and full of dangling plot issues." The film holds a rating of 8% on Rotten Tomatoes based on reviews from 12 critics.
