= Kelly Reno =

American actor (born 1966)

- Born: June 19, 1966 (age 60); Pueblo, Colorado, US
- Occupations: Actor, rancher, trucker
- Years active: 1979–1985
- Spouses: Lynette Tuttle (m. 1986; div. 1996) Annette Crump (m. 1998; div. 2005) Dawn Hickey (m. 2007)
- Children: 4

Kelly Reno (born June 19, 1966) is a former child actor, rancher, and trucker. At age 13, he was cast in the role of Alec Ramsey, the young boy who is marooned on a deserted island along with an Arabian horse, in The Black Stallion (based on the novel by Walter Farley).

== Early life, family and education ==
Reno was born and raised in Pueblo, Colorado. His parents, Bud and Ruth, were cattle ranchers. He graduated from high school in 1984.

== Career ==
After responding to an open casting call, he was cast at age 13 as the main character, Alec Ramsey, in The Black Stallion. Directed by Carroll Ballard and co-starring Mickey Rooney and Teri Garr, the film was made in 1979. Reno did nearly all of his own action scenes in the movie. He reprised the role in the 1983 film adaptation of Farley's The Black Stallion Returns much of which was filmed in Morocco.

He performed as an Alamo messenger who travels through time in "Alamo Jobe", a 1985 episode in Steven Spielberg's anthology TV series Amazing Stories.

After graduating from high school, Reno was driving a pick-up truck that was hit by a semi-truck. The resultant injuries were severe, and the long recovery time squelched his acting career. After 20 years as a cattle rancher, Reno became a semi-truck driver.

== Personal life ==
Reno married Lynette Tuttle in 1986; they had three children: Ryan, Raelyn, and Justin. They divorced in 1996. They were reported to be residents of the Pueblo, Colorado, area. Reno married Annette Crump in 1998; they divorced in 2005. He married his current wife, Dawn Hickey, in 2007.

== Filmography ==
=== Films ===
Year	Title	Notes	Role
1979	The Black Stallion		Alec Ramsey
1983	The Black Stallion Returns		Alec Ramsey
1983	Brady's Escape		Miki
2021	No Man's Law		Kelly

=== Television ===
Year	Title	Role	Notes
1983	The Merv Griffin Show	Himself	1 episode
1985	Amazing Stories	Alamo Jobe	Episode: "Alamo Jobe"

== Bibliography ==
- Holmstrom, John. The Moving Picture Boy: An International Encyclopedia from 1895 to 1995. Norwich, Michael Russell, 1996, p. 372–373.
