= The Black Stallion Returns =

1983 film by Robert Dalva

- Theatrical release poster
- Directed by: Robert Dalva
- Screenplay by: Jerome Kass; Richard Kletter
- Based on: The Black Stallion Returns; 1945 novel by Walter Farley
- Produced by: Fred Roos; Francis Ford Coppola; Tom Sternberg
- Starring: Kelly Reno; Teri Garr; Allen Garfield; Vincent Spano; Woody Strode
- Narrated by: Hoyt Axton
- Cinematography: Carlo Di Palma
- Edited by: Paul Hirsch
- Music by: Georges Delerue
- Production companies: United Artists; Zoetrope Studios
- Distributed by: MGM/UA Entertainment Co.
- Release date: March 25, 1983
- Running time: 103 minutes
- Country: United States
- Language: English
- Box office: $12 million

The Black Stallion Returns is a 1983 adventure film, an adaptation of the book of the same name by Walter Farley, and sequel to The Black Stallion. The only film directed by Robert Dalva, it was produced by Francis Ford Coppola for MGM/UA Entertainment Company.

Kelly Reno and Teri Garr reprise their roles with Hoyt Axton once again serving as the narrator. New cast members include Allen Garfield, Vincent Spano and Woody Strode. The portrayal of The Black was shared between Cass Ole, the horse from the first film, and El Mokhtar in his only film appearance.

== Plot ==
Several odd occurrences, including a suspicious fire, happen at the farm where Alec Ramsay (Kelly Reno) and his mother (Teri Garr) stable Alec's horse, “The Black.” One night, “The Black” is taken away. Sheik Ishak (Ferdy Mayne) says he is responsible, claiming that the stallion is his stolen property that he has retrieved, learning his whereabouts due to the publicity about “The Black” winning in the match race and that his real name is Shêtân ("devil"). After learning that the sheik is returning “The Black” to his kingdom in the Moroccan desert, Alec stows away on a plane to Casablanca.

In Morocco, Alec makes some friends who disguise him as a local. They take him to a man named Kurr (Allen Garfield), the leader of a rogue tribe called the Uruk, who is interested in “The Black” and Sheik Ishak. He allows Alec to travel with him and another man, but they abandon Alec in the desert after the truck breaks down. Alec is picked up by another truck driver. Aboard the truck, he meets Raj (Vincent Spano), who learned English from university. The two become friends and travel across the desert on foot with Meslar (Woody Strode), Raj's friend and mentor. Then the Uruk kidnap Meslar, and Raj and Alec must defend themselves against the harsh elements as their camel dies. After running out of water, they collapse but recover when they find a river.

Raj's tribe discovers them, welcoming Raj home and Alec to the tribe. Raj takes Alec to Ishak's domain, where he reunites with “The Black” but is apprehended by Ishak's men. He pleads his case to Sheik Ishak, who is sympathetic but will not give up the horse. He is racing the stallion in the "Great Race" with his granddaughter, Tabari (Jodi Thelen) as the rider. Alec insists “The Black” can only win if he rides him. Denied, Alec coaches Tabari, but “The Black” throws her off during practice. Then, the Uruk capture “The Black” and Alec, but the two escape. As they flee, Alec discovers that Meslar is being held prisoner and gives him his pocket knife to cut his bonds. Alec and “The Black” return to Ishak's. As a reward, Alec is allowed to ride him in the race.

On race day, Alec reunites with Raj, who is also competing. They and the other riders begin their run across the desert. The Uruk's rider tries to kill Alec, but he and “The Black” escape. Alec discovers that the Uruk's rider pushed Raj off his horse and returns Raj's mount to him. Together, they race against the Uruk rider until Meslar appears and spooks the rider's horse, unseating him. Suddenly, Kurr chases Raj and Alec in his truck, shooting at them. However, the truck crashes into a ditch.

Alec wins the race, then pleads with Ishak to spare Raj's horse, despite the winning sheik taking any horses he chooses. Ishak grants the reprieve, which allows Alec to repay Raj for his kindness. Meslar returns with Kurr, his accomplice, and the Uruk rider, who are all taken prisoner.

Although Ishak gives “The Black” back to Alec, he decides to leave his horse in Morocco, believing he belongs there.

== Cast ==
- Kelly Reno as Alec Ramsey
- Vincent Spano as Raj
- Allen Garfield as Kurr
- Woody Strode as Meslar
- Ferdy Mayne as Abu Ben Ishak
- Jodi Thelen as Tabari
- Teri Garr as Mrs. Ramsey, Alec's Mother
- Hoyt Axton as The Narrator (voice)
- Cass Ole / El Mokhtar as The Black
- Larbi Doghmi as Arab

== Production ==
The filming locations for "The Black Stallion Returns" took place in Djanet, Algeria; Abiquiu, New Mexico; Italy; Morocco; Santa Clarita & Los Angeles, California; and New York City. The role of the Black Stallion was played by Cass Ole (who starred in the first film) and El Mokhtar, who was used in the racing scenes of the film, but he died from colic during the making of the film.

== Reception ==
=== Box office ===
The Black Stallion Returns debuted at #5 at the box office, grossing $2,923,297 during its opening weekend, coming in behind the films High Road to China and Tootsie. The film grossed $12,049,108 at the North American box office.

=== Critical response ===
Vincent Canby of The New York Times said the film was "funny, unpretentious and fast-paced. It has a kind of comicbook appreciation for direct action and no time whatsoever for mysticism or for scenery for its own sake, though most of it was shot in Morocco and is fun to look at". The Boston Globe called it a "slow-paced, incompetently directed film with both eyes focused on the box office". Variety magazine said, "The Black Stallion Returns is little more than a contrived, cornball story that most audiences will find to be an interminable bore". Roger Ebert complained about the film's stereotypical portrayal of Arab characters in his review, while noting that Allen Garfield was miscast.

== Accolades ==
Young Artist Awards

- Best Young Motion Picture Actor in a Feature Film: Kelly Reno (nominated)

== See also ==
- List of films about horses
- List of films about horse racing
- The Black Stallion books
