= Walter Farley =

American writer

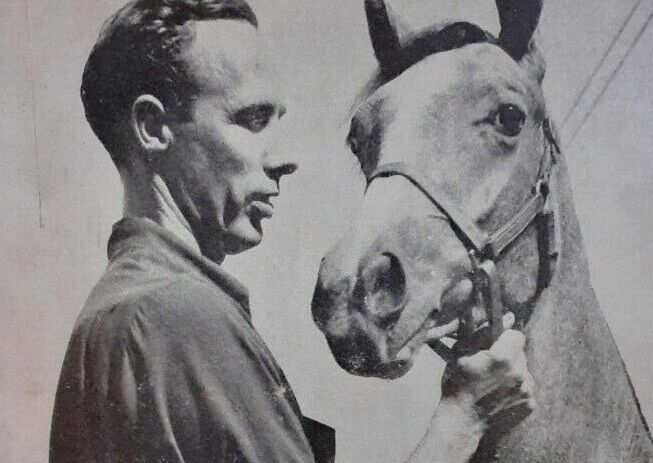
- Farley with a horse, circa 1950-1952
- Born: June 26, 1915; Syracuse, New York, US
- Died: October 16, 1989 (aged 74); Venice, Florida, US
- Education: Columbia College of Columbia University
- Occupation: Writer
- Spouse: Rosemary
- Children: 4
- Writing career
- Language: English
- Period: 1941–1989
- Genre: young adult literature
- Notable work: The Black Stallion

Walter Farley (born Walter Lorimer Farley, 26 June 1915 – 16 October 1989) was an American author, primarily of horse stories for children. His first and most famous work was The Black Stallion (1941), the success of which led to many sequels over decades; the series has been continued since his death by his son Steven.

== Life ==
Farley was the son of Walter Patrick Farley and Isabelle "Belle" L. (Vermilyea) Farley. His uncle was a professional horseman and taught him various methods of horse training and about the advantages or disadvantages of each method. Farley began to write The Black Stallion while he was a student at Brooklyn's Erasmus Hall High School and Mercersburg Academy in Pennsylvania. He finished it and had it published in 1941 while still an undergraduate at Columbia College of Columbia University, where he received a B.A. the same year.

Most of the novel takes place in New York City, albeit one of its less developed areas: Flushing, in the borough of Queens. The neighborhood is near the site of the 1939 World's Fair and the Belmont Park racetrack, an important venue for horse racing. This area up to the end of World War II still supported agriculture, including cows, horses and truck farming. After the War, the land was sold and eventually high rise apartments were built.

Farley also served as a reporter with the U.S. Army's 4th Armored Division during World War II, writing for Yank, an army publication.

Farley and his wife, Rosemary, had four children—Pam, Alice, Steven and Tim—whom they raised on a farm in Pennsylvania and in a beach house in Florida. In 1989 Farley was honored by his hometown library in Venice, Florida, which established the Walter Farley Literary Landmark in its children's wing. Farley died of cancer in October 1989, shortly before the publication of The Young Black Stallion, the twenty-first book in the series, and during production of the television series The Adventures of the Black Stallion.

== Bibliography ==
=== List of books in the Black Stallion series ===
- The Black Stallion (1941)
- The Black Stallion Returns (1945)
- Son of the Black Stallion (1947)
- The Island Stallion (1948)
- The Black Stallion and Satan (1949)
- The Black Stallion's Blood Bay Colt (1950)
- The Island Stallion's Fury (1951)
- The Black Stallion's Filly (1952)
- The Black Stallion Revolts (1953)
- The Black Stallion's Sulky Colt (1954)
- The Island Stallion Races (1955)
- The Black Stallion's Courage (1956)
- The Black Stallion Mystery (1957)
- The Horse-Tamer (1958)
- The Black Stallion and Flame (1960)
- The Black Stallion Challenged (1964)
- The Black Stallion's Ghost (1969)
- The Black Stallion and the Girl (1971)
- The Black Stallion Legend (1983)
- The Young Black Stallion (1989)

=== Others ===
- Larry and the Undersea Raider (1942)
- Man o' War
- Big Black Horse (young children's easy-reader version of The Black Stallion)
- Little Black, A Pony
- Little Black Goes to the Circus (1963) Beginner Books Book Club Edition
- The Little Black Pony Races
- The Horse That Swam Away
- Great Dane Thor
- Walter Farley's How to Stay Out of Trouble with Your Horse: Some Basic Safety Rules to Help You Enjoy Riding (1981) (nonfiction)
