= The Black Stallion =

Book series by Walter Farley

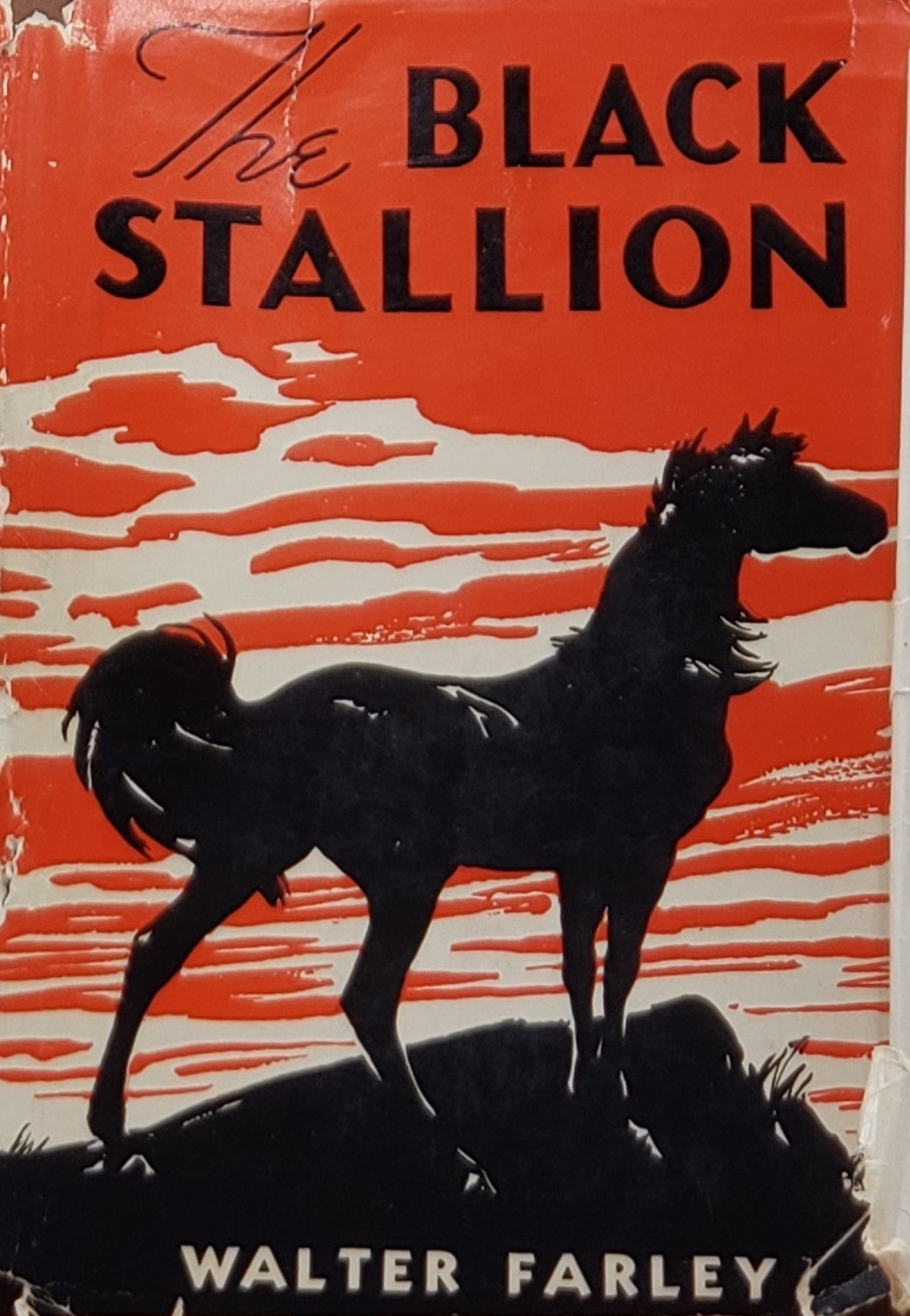
1941 edition (publ. Random House)

The Black Stallion is a series of novels by Walter Farley, beginning with the book of the same name published in 1941. The title character, an Arab stallion also known as the Black, is a sheikh’s prized stallion who comes into possession of one Alec Ramsay. Later books in the series furnish the Black's backstory.

The novels are about the Black himself and the stallion's three main offspring: his firstborn colt, Satan; his second colt, Bonfire; and his firstborn filly, Black Minx. Along with the Black, the series introduces a second stallion that is considered the Black's only equal—The Island Stallion, Flame. This is a separate storyline until Flame and the Black meet in two books—The Black Stallion and Flame, and The Black Stallion Challenged. However, news of Flame's win in an international race in Cuba, and his mysterious disappearance, are mentioned at the end of The Black Stallion Mystery, which serves as the first introduction of this rival for the later books in which they meet.

The first two books, as well as the final book of the series, were adapted for the films The Black Stallion (1979), The Black Stallion Returns (1983), and The Young Black Stallion (2003).

The Black Stallion was described as "the most famous fictional horse of the century" by The New York Times.

== The Black Stallion books ==
The original Black Stallion series listed here was written by Walter Farley. The Young Black Stallion, about the Black's early years, was written with Farley's son, Steven Farley, who continued The Young Black Stallion as a series for younger readers after the death of Walter Farley. Steven Farley has subsequently written additional Black Stallion novels, which are not included here.

1. The Black Stallion (1941): In the series' first book, teenaged Alec Ramsay, returning from India after visiting his missionary uncle, sees an untamed and apparently wild black stallion at an Arabian seaport. The black stallion is loaded onto the ship, but a violent storm causes the vessel to sink. Alec and the Black escape and are stranded together on a desert island. Dependent on each other for survival, the boy and horse learn to trust and love each other as they establish an amazingly strong emotional bond. After their rescue, Alec befriends retired racehorse trainer Henry Dailey, who lives near Alec in Flushing, New York. Henry recognizes the Black's superior breeding, and he and Alec secretly begin training the Black to race. But without a documented pedigree, Alec and Henry can only compete the Black as a mystery horse in a match race between two champions: Cyclone and Sun Raider.
2. The Black Stallion Returns (1945): Now famous for winning the match race, Alec discovers that two men are after the Black. One, an Arab sheikh, who claims he is the Black's rightful owner; while the other attempts to murder the beautiful steed. The sheikh proves he legally owns the Black and takes him back to Arabia, but Alec is determined to see his horse again. Following the pair to Arabia, Alec, along with Henry, encounters great evil and intrigue, as only a horse as spectacular as the Black could inspire.
3. Son of the Black Stallion (1947): When Alec receives the Black Stallion's first offspring as a gift, he believes that his dreams have come true. Alec names the colt Satan, but a savage and wild nature make the horse dangerous and unpredictable. Still, Alec aided by Henry Dailey, is resolved to gain the fiery colt's trust, even if it means risking his own life.
4. The Island Stallion (1948): This novel introduces the stallion, Flame. A boy, Steve Duncan, and his archaeologist friend, Phil "Pitch" Pitcher, spend two weeks on a desolate Caribbean island, called Azul (blue in Spanish) Island, where they discover an entrance to a hidden valley through tunnels built by Spanish Conquistadors. There they find a wild, flame-colored stallion and his herd, descended from the Spaniards' horses.
5. The Black Stallion and Satan (1949): After Alec Ramsay inherits the Black, he has an opportunity to discover which stallion—Black or his colt, Satan—is the fastest when Satan, Black, and other famous thoroughbreds, must race for their lives to escape a raging forest fire with only one witness to prove their speed.
6. The Blood Bay Colt (1951): Veteran harness race driver Jimmy Creech, an aging driver and trainer who is reluctant to accept that Standardbred harness racing has moved from the county fairs to the big night-time, moneymaking raceways, pins his comeback hopes on Bonfire, the Black Stallion's second colt. His dreams are threatened by ill health and by the inexperience of his young apprentice driver, Tom. Jimmy hopes that the great Black Stallion has given his son the speed and will to win.
7. The Island Stallion's Fury (1951): Pitch and Steve's secret island valley is discovered and invaded by a hard, vicious man (Tom—Pitch's stepbrother) who sees Flame and his band as creatures to be conquered by force.
8. The Black Stallion's Filly (1952): Henry Dailey buys the Black's first filly to train for the Kentucky Derby, but Black Minx, like her sire, has a mind of her own and challenges Henry and Alec to train her with methods they have never used before.
9. The Black Stallion Revolts (1953): When his restless black stallion revolts against the routine and schedule of stable life, becoming a potential killer, a plane crash thwarts Alec's plans to give the Black free run in the desert, bringing danger to both boy and horse.
10. The Black Stallion's Sulky Colt (1954): Bonfire and Tom are injured in a racing accident, leading Alec Ramsay and Henry Dailey to try harness racing. They train the Black's second colt for the Hambletonian Stakes, harness racing's most prestigious race, equivalent to thoroughbred racing's Kentucky Derby.
11. The Island Stallion Races (1955): Two strangers enter the secret valley of Azul Island and offer Steve an opportunity for Flame to compete against the world's fastest race horses.
12. The Black Stallion's Courage (1956): With Henry and Alec needing money to rebuild their destroyed, uninsured barn, the Black is brought out of retirement for a match race against two other champion racers, Eclipse and Casey. Despite competing at a significant weight disadvantage, the Black narrowly wins.
13. The Black Stallion Mystery (1957): When three yearling colts arrive in the USA that are carbon copies of the Black, Alec believes that his world-famous black stallion's sire may still be alive. His quest brings him to an unidentified location—a mountainous Shangri-La for horse breeding—held by Arabian sheikhs for centuries, into a neatly laid trap and a meeting with the Black's sire.
14. The Horse Tamer (1958): Henry Dailey, the Black Stallion's trainer, tells young Alec Ramsay about his brother, horse tamer Bill Dailey, who rehabilitated many vicious and badly trained horses and worked to expose one unscrupulous horseman's tactics.
15. The Black Stallion and Flame (1960): A plane crash strands the Black on a Caribbean island with Farley's other legendary stallion—Flame. Their struggle for power becomes a fight for survival when the two horses band together to fight a deadly vampire bat.
16. Man o' War (1962): A fictionalized biography of the American race horse who won twenty of twenty-one races, told by a stable boy who grew up with the great horse.
17. The Black Stallion Challenged (1964): Alec, racing the Black in Florida over the winter, receives a letter from Steve Duncan, who challenges his horse, Flame, against Alec's champion steed. Steve and Alec have never met, but the two young men are unaware that their stallions have already met under hostile terms, and the horses' mutual hatred turns into focused rivalry as the two race to see who is the greater stallion.
18. The Black Stallion's Ghost (1969): A peaceful Florida vacation is transformed into a nightmare when Alec Ramsay and the Black stumble upon a mysterious horseman and his grey mare, deep in the Everglades.
19. The Black Stallion and the Girl (1971): Hopeful Farm's success has greatly increased Alec and Henry's workload. After firing an employee for striking a yearling, Alec takes out an advertisement in a racing magazine. When Pam Athena applies for the job, Alec has a hard time persuading his partners to retain her as a trainer and an even harder time convincing himself to let her ride the Black Stallion when Alec is suspended as a jockey.
20. The Black Stallion Legend (1983): Distraught after receiving the news of Pam’s death, Alec and the Black flee to the desert. There, the black stallion is called upon to save an Indian tribe during a disaster in order to fulfill an ancient prophecy.

=== With Steven Farley ===
1. The Young Black Stallion (1989): A prequel to The Black Stallion, this novel tells the story about the Black before he was shipwrecked with Alec. Born in the mountain stronghold of Sheikh Abu Ja' Kub ben Ishak, the colt shows great promise. During a rival band's attempt to steal him, the colt escapes and learns to survive on his own in the high mountains. Befriended by Rashid, a young Bedouin, the stallion journeys to the desert, attempting to elude the rival horse trader groups seeking him.

=== For young children ===
- Big Black Horse: An easy-reader picture book version of The Black Stallion.
- Little Black, A Pony: An easy-reader picture book in which Little Black, a brave and loving pony, proves his worth to his boy, who has transitioned to a bigger horse.
- Little Black Goes to the Circus: An "I Can Read It All By Myself" picture book that tells of Little Black, a pony, and his bravery when the circus comes to town.

== Characters ==
Alexander "Alec" Ramsay: The red-headed young man is the main character in Walter Farley's books. Alec has a passion for horses and has a close bond with his stallion, the Black, that no one can explain or understand, even Alec himself.

Henry Dailey: A retired race-horse trainer and close friend to Alec. A forgotten jockey legend, Henry's career is revived after teaming with Alec to train the Black. Henry later trains many of Hopeful Farm's racehorses.

Charles Volence: Owner of Sun Raider, and accompanies Alec and Henry on their first trip to Arabia.

Tony: an Italian immigrant who owns the carthorse gelding, Napoleon, and works as a vegetable salesman in New York City's smaller streets. Both Tony and Napoleon forge a close bond with the Black and a close friendship remains between Tony, Alec, and Henry throughout the series. Napoleon becomes the Black's constant companion.

Mr. and Mrs. Ramsay: Alec Ramsay's supportive parents. Mr. Ramsay has a more prominent role in the books than his wife, later helping to run Hopeful Farm's business affairs. He is described as tall and good-featured. Mrs. Ramsay is described as plump and kind. In the film adaption, Mr. Ramsay is on the doomed ship with Alec, but is drowned. Mrs. Ramsay is slender and has a slightly edgier personality than her book counterpart.

Steve Duncan: The young man who discovers the red stallion, Flame on an island and later trains and races him in a match race. He and Alec meet in The Black Stallion Challenged, but his friendship with Alec is complex, due to an obvious competition between the two, and Steve's jealousy towards Alec. Steve is a slightly unhappy, easily annoyed character who Alec strives to befriend but is unable to get past Steve's rather strange personality.

Phil "Pitch" Pitcher: Steve's long-time friend, an amateur archaeologist. He is comparable to Henry in several ways, but Alec describes him as looking more tired and less happy.

Abu Ja' Kub ben Ishak: A sheikh, and Shêtân's (the Black) original owner and breeder. Abu was killed when the Black threw him during a training workout, dying from his injuries.

Tabari: Sheikh Ishak's beautiful daughter, whose friendship with Alec is complicated and ever-changing. Tabari Ishak sent Alec a letter describing how Abu had perished and that her father had willed Shêtân (the Black) to Alec. He is shocked to read, "but for that, we would have destroyed him". She owns her purebred Nejdi horse, Jôhar.

Abd-al-Rahman: A younger sheikh from a kingdom near Abu's. He later marries Tabari and allows her a great deal of independence despite the attitudes and expectations of the time.

Ibn al Khaldun: A fat, wrinkled, one-armed man who travels on the same plane as Alec, Henry, and Volence on their first trip to Arabia. Alec is suspicious of him wanting to do away with the Black.

Raj: Brother of Abd-al-Rahman, and friend of Alec Ramsay who lives in Arabia.

Pam Athena: A girl who proved to be an excellent jockey and good worker to Hopeful Farm, and loosened the hardened jockey Alec. She was romantically involved with Alec up until her death in a car accident. Walter Farley based the character on his own daughter and wrote the book that features Pam's death, The Black Stallion Legend, in grief of his daughter's death.

Joe Russo: A young journalist from The Daily Telegraph who helped Alec and the Black.

== Horses ==
Ziyadah: Sire of the Black and known as "Firetail". He is a golden chestnut stallion who is in The Black Stallion's Mystery.

The Black Stallion/Shêtân: The black Arabian crossbred stallion who is the main character of the Black Stallion series. He is strong, fast, temperamental, and shares a strong bond with Alec. He was originally bred in Arabia, the property of Abu Ja' Kub ben Ishak, but ultimately was captured or stolen, placed on a ship to a destination unknown, where he first encounters Alec. After the two are shipwrecked and then rescued, he is taken to America by Alec, and becomes a horse to reckon with out on the racetrack.

Napoleon: A mature, gentle gelding belonging to Tony, a vegetable seller. Often fondly called "Nappy", he plays a larger role in the first several books. Napoleon is the Black's stable mate and close pal, but he and Satan were not on good terms in the beginning, due to Satan's original savage nature. Napoleon pulls Tony's vegetable cart through the smaller areas of New York, though he eventually is retired and becomes the Black's full-time companion.

Satan: The Black's first colt, all black with a white diamond on his forehead. He is at first a dangerous, brutal colt, and nearly kills Alec. Henry eventually tames Satan, turning him into a racing legend. Ultimately Satan and Henry develop a close bond.

Bonfire: The Black Stallion's second colt in the books The Blood Bay Colt and The Black Stallion's Sulky Colt. He competes in the famed Hambletonian race.

Black Minx: The Black's first filly is all black and has issues from poor handling and a sensitive temperament. Purchased at an auction by Henry, who has trained many horses but not actually owned one, he overcomes her quirks, even fashioning her a false tail to replace her docked one, lost in an accident, to boost her confidence. Henry trains her as a racehorse and with Alec in the saddle, they go on to win the Kentucky Derby. She is slightly lazy and lacks the drive for racing, and also develops what appears to be an obsession with a rival colt, Wintertime, which ultimately leads to her retirement. Walter Farley felt that the Black's first daughter needed the perfect name, and so he turned to his readers with the prize of a colt if their name for the Black's first daughter was selected in a contest.

Sagr: Owned by Abd-al-Rhaman, Sagr is a giant chestnut stallion also from Arabia, with similar features as Shêtân. He is big, strong, and bold. He is a worthy rival to The Black.

Jôhar: A Nejdi purebred Arabian mare owned by Tabari, a gray with a pure white coat. She becomes the dam of The Black's first foal, Satan.

Flame: The chestnut stallion found on Azul Island by Steve Duncan. Flame strongly resembles an Arabian, though much larger—similar to The Black. He equals the Black Stallion in a match race.

Wintertime: A small, quick, blood-bay stallion, a rival to Black Minx. He is retired after an injury on the track, and becomes Black Minx's mate.

Eclipse: A dark brown colt with a white blaze, initially beaten by Black Minx, who soon matures into a powerful contender who takes on older, more experienced horses and becomes almost an equal to the Black's fame and speed.

Casey: An experienced, winning chestnut horse whose speed and skilled jockey test the Black and Alec in a three-way race that includes Eclipse.

Sun Raider and Cyclone: The first two champion horses that the Black competes against and ultimately beats in a match race billed as "the race of the century".

The Ghost: A beautiful light grey mare, a liberty dressage superstar, featured in The Black Stallion's Ghost. The eerie tale culminates when Alec is obsessed with purchasing this mare and breeding her to The Black. Her foal with the Black is never seen in the books that are written by Walter Farley, but his son Steven Farley invents the foal as a steeplechaser race horse named Black Storm.

Black Pepper: Daughter of Black Minx, presumably sired by Wintertime.

Black Sand: Son of Satan, a promising young colt and favorite of Pam Athena, who must overcome fears linked to abuse by a previous owner.

== Movie and TV adaptations ==
- The Black Stallion (1979), based on the first novel.
- The Black Stallion Returns (1983), based on the second novel.
- The Adventures of the Black Stallion (1990), a TV series far removed from the novels.
- The Young Black Stallion (2003), based on the prequel novel.

== Reception ==
The eponymous first novel of the series, The Black Stallion, won the 1944 Young Reader's Choice Award.

Awards
Preceded by Lassie Come-Home	Young Reader's Choice Award recipient 1944	Succeeded by Snow Treasure
