= The Three Mothers =

Trilogy of Italian horror films

The Three Mothers Le Tre madri
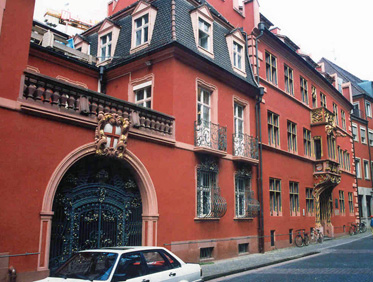
- "Zum Walfisch" (in German, in English "The Whale"), a famous building in Freiburg, served as one of the witches' homes in Suspiria
- Directed by: Dario Argento
- Written by: Dario Argento; Daria Nicolodi; Jace Anderson; Adam Gierasch
- Produced by: Claudio Argento
- Starring: Jessica Harper (1); Stefania Casini (1); Flavio Bucci (1); Miguel Bose (1); Alida Vali (1,2); Joan Bennett (1); Udo Kier (1,3); Barbara Magnolfi (1); Leigh McCloskey (2); Irene Miracle (2); Eleonora Giorgi (2); Daria Nicolodi (2,3); Veronica Lazar (2); Feodor Chaliapin, Jr (2); Asia Argento (3); Christian Solimeno (3); Moran Atias (3); Adam James (3); Philippe Leroy (3); Velaria Cavalli (3)
- Cinematography: Luciano Tivoli (1977); Romano Albani (1980); Fredrick Fasano (2007)
- Edited by: Franco Fraticelli (1977, 1980); Walter Fasano (2007)
- Music by: Goblin; Keith Emerson; Claudio Simonetti
- Production companies: Seda Spettacoli (1); Produzioni Intersound (2); Medusa Film (3); Myriad Pictures (3); Opera Film (3)
- Distributed by: Produzioni Atlas Consorziate (1); 20th Century Fox (2); Medusa Distribuzione (Italy) (3); Myriad Pictures (United States) (3)
- Running time: 307 minutes (3 films)
- Country: Italy
- Language: English

The Three Mothers (Italian: Le Tre madri) is a trilogy of supernatural horror films by Italian filmmaker Dario Argento. It consists of Suspiria, Inferno, and Mother of Tears. Each film deals with one of the "Mothers", a triumvirate of ancient witches who are determined to rule the world, using their powerful magic to manipulate its events on a global scale, killing anyone who discover their whereabouts.

During the 2007 Toronto International Film Festival, Argento stated he had not ruled out the possibility of shooting a fourth film dealing with the Three Mothers. His daughter Asia has suggested that there might be a prequel.

== Dario Argento's Three Mothers ==
The story of the Three Mothers opens at the beginning of the 11th century, when the origin of witchcraft is depicted as three sisters on the coast of the black sea. In the years that followed, they wandered the world and amassed great personal wealth and power, leaving death in their wake. The sisters are known as, "The Mothers", hence the title of the trilogy.

Both Mater Suspiriorum and Tenebrarum have claimed that the Mothers are Death personified. In the late 19th century the women commissioned E. Varelli, an Italian architect based in London, to design and construct three stately buildings. From these enchanted, bastion-like homes, the Three Mothers "rule the world". According to Varelli's memoirs, entitled The Three Mothers by an anonymous colleague, the architect learned too late of the women's evil nature. (At least six copies of the book are known to have existed. Four may have been destroyed at the end of Inferno.) The residences he designed will become so corrupted that eventually, the land they were built on will become pestilential.

=== Mater Suspiriorum / Helena Markos ===
Mater Suspiriorum, the Mother of Sighs, is the oldest and wisest of the Three Mothers, her given name is Helena Markos. She is also known as The Black Queen; any mention of Helena Markos as one of the Three Mothers would not be made until Inferno three years later. Lela Svasta, who portrayed Markos in Suspiria, was uncredited. According to Jessica Harper, "The witch was a ninety-year-old ex-hooker Dario had found on the streets of Rome."

Markos, a Greek émigré, was exiled from many European countries and had written several books on a variety of arcane subjects. In 1895, she founded the Tanz Akademie ("Dance Academy" in German), a school for dance and the occult sciences, in the Black Forest outside Freiburg, Germany. The locals feared her, having intuited that she was a witch. As Markos' wealth grew, so did suspicion about her true nature. To avert this unwanted scrutiny, she faked her own death in a fire in 1905. Control of the academy, which transitioned to a ballet school, subsequently passed to Markos' prize pupil (who was Markos herself). As the original Freiburg building "Haus zum Walfisch" the Akademie bears a plaque stating that Desiderius Erasmus once lived there.

In Suspiria, Markos is the Directress whose presence is concealed by her coven, headed by Madame Blanc (Joan Bennett). A young American, Suzy Bannion (Jessica Harper), discovers the hidden chambers beneath the school after several pupils are killed by Markos' proxies. The aged witch attempts to use her magic to kill the girl, but her powers — including those of invisibility, illusion casting, and telekinesis — prove insufficient due to her feeble state. Bannion defeats Markos by stabbing her in the neck. The witch's death causes the foundations of her home and coven to fail.

In The Mother of Tears, it is revealed that before the events of Suspiria, Elisa Mandy (Daria Nicolodi), a white witch, sought to challenge Markos' evil might. The two battled in Freiburg, and Markos slew both Elisa and her husband. According to Father Johannes (Udo Kier) in the third film, the battle left Suspiriorum "a shell of her former self". Elisa's daughter Sarah would later defeat Mater Lachrymarum in Rome.

In the 2018 remake of Suspiria, the roles of both Madame Blanc and Helena Markos, referred throughout as Mother Markos, are played by Tilda Swinton. Markos is depicted as an ancient, disfigured, centuries-old crone maintaining control over the coven and seeking to acquire a new, younger body as her current one is riddled in leprous sores, tumorous growths and immobile infants' limbs growing out of her own. In this version, it is revealed in the climax that Markos is a fraud and Susie Bannion (Dakota Johnson) is the real Mater Suspiriorum.

=== Mater Tenebrarum ===
Mater Tenebrarum, the Mother of Darkness, is the youngest and cruelest of the Three Mothers. Her true name is not given; her home is located in New York City and was christened in 1910. The house's number is 49 and bears a plaque that states that Georges Ivanovich Gurdjieff once resided there.

In Inferno, the character is portrayed by Veronica Lazar. She masquerades as Professor Arnold's nurse for much of the film. At the climax, Mark Elliot (Leigh McCloskey) descends into the bowels of her home to confront her. He learns that Arnold is, in fact, the architect Varelli, and essentially Tenebrarum's slave. Tenebrarum's bloodlust would ultimately be her own undoing, as one of her victims, a maid, was inadvertently responsible for the house catching fire in the midst of her death throes. When Elliot comes across her, Tenebrarum laments cryptically that "It's all going to burn down... just like before." Tenebrarum is perhaps referring to Suspiria's finale, during which Mater Suspiriorum is killed and her home eventually burns to the ground. After sealing the room, she laughs psychotically, makes an ambiguous speech, and disappears. However, her reflection remains in a mirror and bursts out moments later as the skeletal incarnation of Death. Elliot flees the room by breaking down the door. Tenebrarum is last seen in her skeletal form, screaming as burning debris of her home collapses around her, apparently perishing in the flames.

=== Mater Lachrymarum ===
Mater Lachrymarum, the Mother of Tears, is the most beautiful and powerful of the Three Mothers. Like Tenebrarum, her true name is unknown. Inferno suggests that her home in Rome, Italy may be located near No. 49 Via Dei Bagni - the Abertny Foundation's Biblioteca Filosofica - when Sara (Eleonora Giorgi) notices a strange sweet smell in the air. In The Mother of Tears, Lachrymarum's home is revealed to be the Palazzo Varelli.

In Inferno, Lachrymarum attempted to spellbind Mark Elliot during a music lecture in Rome. According to Argento, Ania Pieroni did not return to reprise her role as Lachrymarum in The Mother of Tears because "she now has five kids!"

Lachrymarum is portrayed by Israeli actress Moran Atias in The Mother of Tears. After the deaths of her sisters, the witch has been hibernating, and is awakened when Sarah Mandy (Asia Argento) opens the urn in which her most powerful relic, a red tunic, is stored. As her minions wreak havoc on the city above, Lachrymarum hides below ground in the catacombs of her Palazzo, regaining her strength. She is defeated when Sarah Mandy discovers her subterranean lair and rips and burns her tunic, causing the Palazzo to collapse. Lachrymarum is killed when an ornamental obelisk from the top of the building crashes into the ceremonial chamber, impaling her.

== Inspiration ==
The idea of "Three Mothers" comes from "Levana and Our Ladies of Sorrow", a section of Thomas de Quincey's Suspiria de Profundis. The piece asserts that just as there are three Fates and Graces, there are also three Sorrows. They include Mater Lachrymarum (Our Lady of Tears), Mater Suspiriorum (Our Lady of Sighs), and Mater Tenebrarum (Our Lady of Darkness). The attribute of each woman (tears, sighs, shadows/darkness) is a direct translation of her name from Latin ("mater" being the Latin word for "mother").

Suspiria may derive its title from the woman delineated in de Quincey's work. Inferno's title does not reference Mater Tenebrarum, but the Italian for Hell is both Inferno or Tenebre.

== Reception ==
=== Critical reaction ===
Film	Rotten Tomatoes	Metacritic
Suspiria	94% (64 reviews)	79 (10 reviews)
Inferno	65% (17 reviews)	69 (8 reviews)
The Mother of Tears	47% (68 reviews)	52 (18 reviews)

== In other media ==
- Frequent Argento collaborator Luigi Cozzi made The Black Cat (1989), which features a meta storyline in which an actress hired to portray "Levana, the Mother of Tears" is terrorized by the witch.
- The manga The Voynich Hotel (2006-2015) features the Three Mothers as major characters.
- The story of the Three Mothers, and specifically that of Mater Suspiriorum, returns in a reimagined form in Luca Guadagnino's 2018 remake of Suspiria.
- In the 2018 film The Night Sitter, The Three Mothers are accidentally summoned by one of the children.
- In the 2023 novel Glass House by Paul Jessup the Three Mothers are trapped in a house by the ritual death of a suicide cult.
