= Pierre; or, The Ambiguities =

1852 novel by Herman Melville

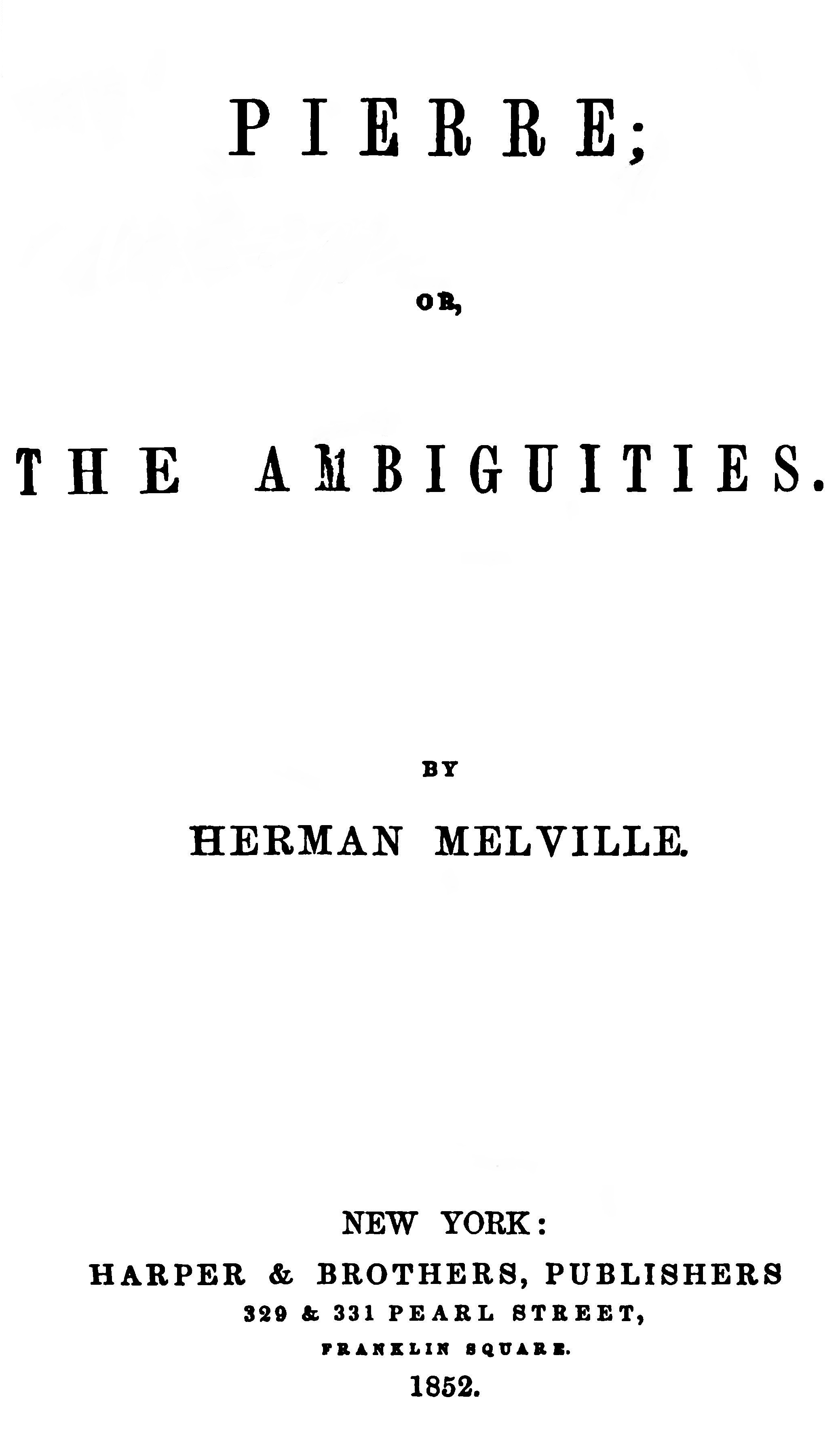
- First edition title page
- Author: Herman Melville
- Language: English
- Genre: Psychological novel, Gothic fiction
- Published: 1852 (New York: Harper & Brothers)
- Publication place: United States
- Media type: Print
- Preceded by: Moby-Dick
- Followed by: Israel Potter

Pierre; or, The Ambiguities is the seventh book by American writer Herman Melville, first published in New York in 1852. The novel uses many conventions of Gothic fiction and depicts psychological, sexual, and familial tension between Pierre Glendinning, his widowed mother, his cousin Glendinning Stanly, his fiancée Lucy Tartan, and Isabel Banford, who is revealed to be his half-sister. According to scholar Henry A. Murray, in writing Pierre Melville "purposed to write his spiritual autobiography in the form of a novel" rather than to experiment and incidentally work some personal experience into the novel.

Published after the lukewarm reaction to Moby-Dick, Pierre was a critical and financial disaster. Reviewers universally condemned its morals and its style. More recent critics have shown greater sympathy toward the book, seeing it as a "psychological novel – a study of the moods, thought processes, and perceptions of his hero".

== Plot ==
Pierre Glendinning Jr. is the 19-year-old heir to the manor at Saddle Meadows in upstate New York. Pierre is engaged to the blonde Lucy Tartan in a match approved by his domineering mother, who controls the estate since the death of his father, Pierre Sr. When he encounters the dark and mysterious Isabel Banford, he hears from her the claim that she is his half-sister, the illegitimate and orphaned child of his father and a European refugee. Pierre reacts to the story and to his magnetic attraction to Isabel by devising a remarkable scheme to preserve his father's name, spare his mother's grief, and give Isabel her proper share of the estate.

He announces to his mother that he is married; she promptly throws him out of the house. He and Isabel then depart for New York City, accompanied by a disgraced young woman, Delly Ulver. During their stagecoach journey, Pierre finds and reads a fragment of a treatise on "Chronometricals and Horologicals" on the differences between absolute and relative virtue by one Plotinus Plinlimmon. In the city, Pierre counts on the hospitality of his friend and cousin Glendinning Stanley, but is surprised when Glen refuses to recognize him. The trio (Pierre, Isabel, and Delly) find rooms in a former church converted to apartments, the Church of the Apostles, now populated by impecunious artists, writers, spiritualists, and philosophers, including the mysterious Plinlimmon. Pierre attempts to earn money by writing a book, encouraged by his juvenile successes as a writer.

He learns that his mother has died and has left the Saddle Meadows estate to Glen Stanley, who is now engaged to marry Lucy Tartan. Suddenly, however, Lucy shows up at the Apostles, determined to share Pierre's life and lot, despite his apparent marriage to Isabel. Pierre and the three women live there together as best they can, while their scant money runs out. Pierre's writing does not go well – having been "Timonized" by his experiences, the darker truths he has come to recognize cannot be reconciled with the light and innocent literature the market seeks. Unable to write, he has a vision in a trance of an earth-bound stone giant Enceladus and his assault on the heavenly Mount of Titans. Beset by debts, by fears of the threats of Glen Stanley and Lucy's brother, by the rejection of his book by its contracted publishers, by fears of his own incestuous passion for Isabel, and finally by doubts of the truth of Isabel's story, Pierre guns down Glen Stanley at rush hour on Broadway, and is taken to jail in The Tombs. Isabel and Lucy visit him, and Lucy dies of shock when Isabel addresses Pierre as her brother. Pierre then seizes upon the secret poison vial that Isabel carries and drinks it, and Isabel finishes the remainder, leaving three corpses as the novel ends.

== Background ==
Before writing Pierre, Melville read the Confessions by Jean-Jacques Rousseau, Autobiographic Sketches and Confessions of an English Opium-Eater by Thomas De Quincey, and Sartor Resartus by Thomas Carlyle. Henry A. Murray writes that Benjamin Disraeli's autobiographical novels provided him with "more raw material for Pierre than any other author" with the exception of Lord Byron. Merton M. Sealts Jr. agrees with Murray that Melville's own fascination in his youth with Byron is reflected in the character of Pierre himself in the early chapters of the novel. "The book which was most potent in fashioning Melville's ideal and thus indirectly affecting his personality and his writings", Murray suggests, was Thomas Moore's Life of Byron. Second to Byron only, "though ahead of him as a source for the first two acts of Pierre", Disraeli—himself a Byronist—was another major influence of Melville's early ideal self-conception, and hence Pierre's personality. Still other yet less consequential "architects of Melville's early ideal self and so of the character of Pierre of act 1" are Walter Scott, Edmund Spenser, Thomas Moore, James Fenimore Cooper, and Edward Bulwer-Lytton. Melville developed the characterization of Pierre further with William Makepeace Thackeray's Pendennis and William Shakespeare's Romeo and Juliet, though the spirit of Shakespeare's play pervades only the early chapters, later giving way to Hamlet's spirit. As stated in Book IX of Pierre, "Dante had made him fierce, and Hamlet had insinuated that there was no one to strike".

== Writing style ==
The characteristics of the style, described by Murray as a "miscellany of grammatical eccentricities, convoluted sentences, neologisms, and verbal fetishisms", are by themselves enough to set Pierre off as "a curiosity of literature". The chapter arrangement, by contrast, with each chapter called "Book" and sub-divided into short numbered sections, seems to aim for a clear structure that for critic Warner Berthoff helps "to salvage some degree of organization and pace from the chaos of Melville's purposes."

=== Imitation of Psalms ===
According to scholar Nathalia Wright, the style of Psalms is imitated in the passage where Pierre and Lucy one morning ride into the country, which is described in the manner of "a prose paean which has many of the characteristics of a Hebrew poem":

Oh, praised be the beauty of this earth; the beauty, and the bloom, and the mirthfulness thereof! The first worlds made were winter worlds; the second made, were vernal worlds; the third, and last, and perfectest, was this summer world of ours. In the cold and nether spheres preachers preach of earth, as we of Paradise above. Oh, there, my friends, they say, they have a season, in their language known as summer. Then their fields spin themselves green carpets; snow and ice are not in all the land; then a million strange, bright, fragrant things powder that sward with perfumes; and high majestic beings, dumb and grand, stand up with outstretched arms, and hold their green canopies over merry angels—men and women—who love and wed, and sleep and dream, beneath the approving glances of their visible god and goddess, glad-hearted sun, and pensive moon! Oh, praised be the beauty of this earth; the beauty, and the bloom, and the mirthfulness thereof. We lived before, and shall live again; and as we hope for a fairer world than this to come; so we came from one less fine. From each successive world, the demon Principle is more and more dislodged; he is the accursed clog from chaos, and thither, by every new translation, we drive him further and further back again. Hosannahs to this world! so beautiful itself, and the vestibule to more. Out of some past Egypt, we have come to this new Canaan, and from this new Canaan, we press on to some Circassia.

The vocabulary and rhythm of this passage, Wright argues, "unmistakably echo the Psalms." The Psalmist employs the words "praised be", "thereof", and "Hosannahs". Melville also follows the general principle of form, with a refrain to introduce each paragraph, with alternation between the outbursts of exultation and the description of matter providing the grounds for the exultation. In the first half of each paragraph is a stanzaic pattern: in the first a distich and a tristich, in the second a distich and a tetrastich. The pattern becomes clear if the passages are printed as poetry:

Oh, praised be the beauty of this earth;
the beauty, and the bloom, and the mirthfulness thereof.
We lived before,
and shall live again;
and as we hope for a fairer world than this to come;
so we came from one less fine.

Unknown to the King James Version translators, parallelism is the fundamental characteristic of all Semitic poetry, with the distich or two-line parallel as the norm, and variations of tristich and tetrastich. Numerous examples from Psalms may be used for comparison, Wright chooses the following, printed to reveal the extent of the parallelism:

Sing unto the Lord with thanksgiving;
Sing praise upon the harp unto our God:
Who covereth the heaven with clouds,
who prepareth rain for the earth,
who maketh grass to grow upon the mountains...
He giveth snow like wool:
he scattereth the hoarfrost like ashes.
He casteth forth his ice like morsels:
who can stand before his cold?
He sendeth out his word,
and melteth them:
he causeth his wind to blow,
and the waters flow.

== Publication history and critical response ==
In a letter from February 1852, now lost, Melville proposed to Richard Bentley, the publisher of his previous five books in Britain, that he publish Pierre, then still unfinished. On March 4, Bentley replied and offered to publish the new work without an advance sum, citing the poor sales of Melville's previous books as the reason for his proposal. On April 16, Melville sent the proofs of Pierre, together with a reply letter rejecting Bentley's offer. Melville's counteroffer for the book was £100, and he added that the finished book was 150 pages longer than he had anticipated when he first wrote about it. Having written the book with a feminine audience in mind, he further thought that "it might not prove unadvisable to publish this present book anonymously, or under an assumed name:–'By a Vermonter' say", or, he wrote in a footnote, "By Guy Winthrop". He wrote further that his new book:

possessing unquestionable novelty ... [is] as I believe, very much more calculated for popularity than anything you have yet published of mine – being a regular romance, with a mysterious plot to it & stirring passions at work, and withall, representing a new & elevated aspect of American life...

When it was published in July 1852, it bore the author's real name and was immediately met with negative critical response. One review which ran in the New York Day Book bore the title "Herman Melville Crazy" while the American Whig Review wrote that Melville's "fancy is diseased".

Brian Higgins and Hershel Parker characterize the novel as "an ambitious experiment in psychological fiction" whose primary focus is the "complex workings of the human psyche", especially the "tortuous processes of distortion and self-deception involved in fervid states of mind combining religious exaltation and sexual arousal." They comment that the novel also draws on the conventions of Gothic fiction. Andrew Delbanco added that Pierre long suffered from being in the shadow of Moby-Dick, but that "with its themes of sexual confusion and transgression" it now seems "fresh and urgent".

Delbanco argues that Melville anticipates Sigmund Freud's assertion that the sexual behavior of each human being transgresses "the standard of normality" to some extent. The novel, Delbanco feels, is ambivalent in dealing with the "rather too loving" supervision of his mother and his "ardent sentiment" for Glen, the young man who is his cousin, with whom he explored "the preliminary love-friendship of boys". Yet, continues Delbanco, it is hard to know whether critics who now see Melville as a homosexual are simply making a long overdue acknowledgment, whether gay readers are projecting their own feelings onto Melville, or both. The novel is subtitled "The Ambiguities". Delbanco concludes that "the quest for a private Melville has usually led to a dead end, and we are not likely to fare better by speculating about his tastes in bed or bunk."

Readers, says Parker, have long been puzzled and critics bothered by the inconsistencies between the character of Pierre in the beginning of the novel and his suddenly becoming an author in later chapters. Parker argues that the reason for this change is biographical, not artistic. He deduces that Melville took a far shorter manuscript to New York for delivery to Harper & Brothers publishing house. The publisher was not pleased to see a psychological novel that delivered sexual and literary shocks and threatened to damage its audience. In any case, the Harper brothers offered a contract so unfavorable that it may actually have been meant as a rejection. This fueled Melville's ire—as did his reading of the negative reviews of Moby-Dick while he was in New York. Parker believes that Melville may have shown the original, shorter manuscript to Everett Duyckinck, who condemned the sexual content as immoral. In frustration and retaliation, Parker concludes, Melville, perhaps in two or three batches, may only then have added the sections dealing with Pierre's literary career, especially the chapter "Young America in Literature", which describes publishers and critics in scathing terms. These additions undermined the structure of the novel and muddied the characterization of Pierre, whom Melville had not originally intended to be an author.

In 1995, Parker published (with HarperCollins) an edition of Pierre that demonstrates what the original might have been like by removing the sections which present Pierre as an author, notably the entirety of Books XVII, XVIII, XXII and passages from other books. Melville scholar John Bryant praised this edition's illustrations by Maurice Sendak, which present Pierre as a "full-blown adolescent: muscular, ecstatic, desperate, devoted, and lonely; he is the man-child invincible." Bryant points out that Sendak's earlier children's book Pierre was written with Melville in mind.

== Adaptations ==
Walter Leyden Brown directed a theatrical adaptation of the book at La MaMa Experimental Theatre Club in Manhattan's East Village in 1974.

The book was the source for the 1999 French film Pola X and its extended cut for television, Pierre ou, Les ambiguïtés, both directed by Leos Carax.

The Denver Center Theatre Company developed and produced the world premiere of Pierre in 2002, a stage play written by Jeffrey Hatcher, and directed by Bruce K. Sevy. The cast included Christopher Kelly as Pierre Glendinning and Morgan Hallett as Isabel Banford.

American composer Richard Beaudoin wrote an opera based on the book; act 1 was staged in August 2007 at London's Arcola Theatre.
