= Inferno (1980 film) =

1980 film by Dario Argento

- Theatrical release poster
- Directed by: Dario Argento
- Screenplay by: Dario Argento
- Story by: Daria Nicolodi (Note: Uncredited; see Inferno (1980 film)#Development.)
- Based on: Suspiria de Profundis by Thomas De Quincey
- Produced by: Claudio Argento
- Starring: Eleonora Giorgi; Gabriele Lavia; Veronica Lazar; Leopoldo Mastelloni; Irene Miracle; Daria Nicolodi; Sacha Pitoëff; Alida Valli; Leigh McCloskey
- Cinematography: Romano Albani
- Edited by: Franco Fraticelli
- Music by: Keith Emerson
- Production company: Produzioni Intersound
- Distributed by: 20th Century Fox
- Release date: 8 February 1980
- Running time: 107 minutes
- Country: Italy
- Budget: US$3 million
- Box office: US$1.6 million

Inferno is a 1980 Italian supernatural horror film written and directed by Dario Argento, and starring Irene Miracle, Leigh McCloskey, Eleonora Giorgi, Daria Nicolodi, Sacha Pitoëff (in his final film role) and Alida Valli. The plot follows a young man's investigation into the disappearance of his sister, who had been living in a New York City apartment building that also served as a home for a powerful, centuries-old witch. A thematic sequel to Suspiria (1977), it is the second installment of Argento's Three Mothers trilogy. The long-delayed concluding entry, The Mother of Tears, was released in 2007. All three films are partially derived from Thomas de Quincey's 1845 work Suspiria de Profundis, a collection of prose poetry in which he proposes the concept of three "Ladies of Sorrow" (Mater Lachrymarum, Mater Suspiriorum and Mater Tenebrarum), concurrent with the three Fates and Graces in Greek mythology.

The film was internationally released by the American studio 20th Century-Fox, who had released Suspiria theatrically in the United States under their "International Classics" banner. Principal photography of Inferno took place largely in studio sets in Rome, though some location shooting also occurred in New York City. 20th Century-Fox released the film in Italy on 8 February 1980, though its release in the United States was shelved for unspecified reasons. In 1986, a year after Fox had issued the film on video in North America, they gave it a limited theatrical release for one week in New York City. Because of its limited release, the film was unable to match the box office success of its predecessor.

While initial critical response was mostly negative, its reputation has improved considerably over the years, and it has been praised for its surreal visual elements and atmosphere, though it has received continued criticism for its incoherent plot. Kim Newman has called it "perhaps the most underrated horror movie of the 1980s." In 2005, the magazine Total Film named Inferno one of the 50 greatest horror films of all time.

== Plot ==
Rose Elliot, a poet living alone in New York City, finds an ancient book titled The Three Mothers. The book, written by an alchemist named Varelli, tells of three evil sisters who rule the world with sorrow, tears, and darkness and dwell in separate homes built for them by the alchemist. Mater Suspiriorum, the Mother of Sighs, lives in Freiburg. Mater Lachrymarum, the Mother of Tears, lives in Rome, and Mater Tenebrarum, the Mother of Darkness, lives in New York City.

Rose suspects that she is living in one of the buildings and writes to her brother Mark, a music student in Rome, urging him to visit her. Using clues provided in the book as a guide, Rose searches the cellar of her building and discovers a hole in the floor that leads to a water-filled ballroom. She accidentally drops her keys and enters the water to find them. After she reclaims the keys, a putrid corpse rises from the depths, frightening her into screaming and beginning to drown. Rose gets out of the water and manages to escape, but is still being watched.

In Rome, Mark attempts to read Rose's letter during class. He is distracted by the intense gaze of a beautiful student who leaves suddenly; Mark follows, leaving the letter behind. His friend Sara picks up the letter and later reads it. Horrified by the letter's contents, she takes a taxi to a library and finds a copy of The Three Mothers and takes it with her. Sara is attacked by a monstrous figure in a laboratory within the building, who recognizes the book. She throws the book to the ground and escapes. Returning home, she phones Mark to tell him to come and asks a neighbour, Carlo, to keep her company. The lights go out, and both Sara and Carlo are stabbed to death by a gloved killer. Mark discovers the bodies and two torn fragments from Rose's letter. After the police arrive, he walks out of Sara's apartment and sees a taxi slowly driving by. In the back seat of the vehicle is the music student, staring at him intently again.

Mark telephones Rose but cannot hear her clearly. He promises to visit just before the connection fails. Rose sees two shadowy figures preparing to enter her apartment. She leaves through a back door, but is followed. She is grabbed from behind by a clawed assailant and guillotined across the neck with glass from a broken window.

Arriving in New York, Mark goes straight to Rose's building, where he meets Carol, the concierge, and some of the residents, including a nurse who cares for elderly Professor Arnold, a wheelchair-user who cannot speak. Mark encounters the sickly Countess Elise De Longvalle Adler, who tells him that Rose has disappeared. After the two find blood on the carpet outside Rose's room, Mark follows the trail of blood. He becomes ill and falls unconscious. Elise sees a black-robed figure dragging Mark away, but the figure stops and comes after Elise. While trying to escape, she is attacked by a swarm of vicious cats, and the figure then catches up with her and stabs her to death. Mark staggers to the house's foyer, where Carol and the nurse put him to bed.

Mark asks Kazanian, the antique dealer who sold Rose "The Three Mothers," about his sister's whereabouts. However, the man provides no information. That night, Kazanian drowns several cats in a Central Park pond and falls into the water. Hundreds of rats from a nearby drain crawl over him, gnawing his flesh. A hot dog vendor hears Kazanian's cries and rushes over, but proceeds to kill him with a knife. More strange deaths occur in the building, while Carol and Elise's butler, John, plots to take advantage of the Countess' death by stealing her valuables. A shocked Carol finds John's corpse in Elise's apartment and drops a lit candle, which starts a fire. Attempting to put out the flames, she becomes entangled in burning draperies and falls from a window to her death.

Mark uses a clue from Rose's letter to discover that beneath each floor is a secret crawl space. He follows hidden passages to a suite of rooms where he finds Professor Arnold, who reveals, via a mechanical voice generator, that he is in fact Varelli. He tries to kill Mark with a hypodermic injection. During the struggle, Varelli's neck is caught in his vocal apparatus, choking him. Mark frees him, only to be told that he is still being watched as Varelli dies. Mark follows a shadowy figure to a lavishly furnished chamber, where he finds Varelli's nurse. Laughing maniacally, she reveals to him that she is Mater Tenebrarum. She transforms into Death personified. However, the fire that has consumed much of the building enables Mark to escape from the witch's den. Debris crashes down on Tenebrarum, destroying her.

== Cast ==
- Leigh McCloskey as Mark Elliott
- Irene Miracle as Rose Elliott
- Eleonora Giorgi as Sara
- Daria Nicolodi as Elise De Longvalle Adler
- Sacha Pitoëff as Kazanian
- Alida Valli as Carol
- Veronica Lazar as The Nurse / Mater Tenebrarum
- Gabriele Lavia as Carlo
- Feodor Chaliapin, Jr. as Professor Arnold / Dr. Varelli
- Leopoldo Mastelloni as John
- Ania Pieroni as The Music Student / Mater Lachrymarum
- Paolo Paoloni as Music Teacher
- Fulvio Mingozzi as Taxi Driver

== Production ==
=== Development ===
In 1977, Suspiria had been an unexpectedly big box office hit for 20th Century-Fox, released in the U.S. under the studio's "International Classics" banner. Capitalizing on the commercial success of the film, Argento and Daria Nicolodi, who had co-written the screenplay, announced that Suspiria was only the first of a proposed trilogy which they referred to as "The Three Mothers" trilogy. The basic concept of all three films is derived from Thomas de Quincey's Suspiria de Profundis, a sequel to his Confessions of an English Opium-Eater. A prose poem of the book entitled "Levana and Our Ladies of Sorrow", details how, just as there are three Fates and three Graces, there are also three Sorrows: Mater Lachrymarum (The Lady of Tears), Mater Suspiriorum (The Lady of Sighs) and Mater Tenebrarum (The Lady of Darkness). As the title suggests, Suspiria focused on Mater Suspiriorum; the evil sister featured in Inferno is Mater Tenebrarum. The concluding chapter of Argento's trilogy, The Mother of Tears (2007), is about Mater Lachrymarum.

When Argento proposed Inferno as his follow-up to Suspiria, 20th Century-Fox agreed to co-finance the production. The film was budgeted at USD $3 million, and Argento's producer brother Claudio secured additional co-production money from Italian and German consortia.

Nicolodi devised the original story concept but received no on-screen credit for her work on the screenplay. Nicolodi explained that she did not seek credit because "having fought so hard to see my humble but excellent work in Suspiria recognized (up until a few days before the première I didn't know if I would see my name in the film credits), I didn't want to live through that again, so I said, 'Do as you please, in any case, the story will talk for me because I wrote it.'" Working from Nicolodi's original story notes, Argento wrote the screenplay while staying in a New York hotel room with a view of Central Park.

=== Filming ===
The filming of Inferno took place mainly on interior studio sets in Rome, but a short amount of time was also set aside for location shooting in New York, including Central Park. Sacha Pitoëff's death scene was filmed on location in Central Park during the summer of 1979. William Lustig, who was credited as the film's Production Coordinator, recalled:

They filmed the actor carrying a bag that contained some kind of moving mechanism, to make it look like it was full of cats. He walked into the lake, pushed the bag underwater, and fell in. At that point, some phony mechanical rats were attached to him for closeups. When the guy at the hamburger stand runs over the lake... that guy was actually running on a plexiglass bridge under the water; it made it look like he was actually running across the surface of the lake. All of the stuff with the live rats was shot back in Europe.

During the film's production, Argento became stricken with a severe case of hepatitis, and had to direct some sequences while lying on his back. At one point, the illness became so painful that he was hospitalized; filming was then restricted to second unit work, some of which was done by Argento's mentor Mario Bava. Argento has called Inferno one of his least favorite of all his films, as his memories of the movie are tainted by his recollection of the painful illness he suffered.

=== Design and effects ===
Argento invited his mentor, Mario Bava, to provide some of the optical effects, matte paintings and trick shots for the film. Some of the cityscape views seen in Inferno were actually tabletop skyscrapers built by Bava out of milk cartons covered with photographs. The apartment building that Rose lived in was in fact only a partial set built in the studio—it was a few floors high and had to be visually augmented with a small sculpture constructed by Bava. This sculpture was set aflame toward the end of production and served as the burning building seen in the climax.

Bava also provided some second unit direction for the production. Maitland McDonagh has suggested that Bava had a hand in the celebrated watery ballroom scene, but that sequence was shot in a water tank by Gianlorenzo Battaglia, without any optical effects work at all. Bava's son, Lamberto Bava, was the film's assistant director.

The film's fiery final sequence was shot without a stunt performer filling in for Leigh McCloskey. After the production's principal photography had been completed, Claudio Argento asked McCloskey if would be willing to perform the stunts himself, as the stuntman hired for the job had broken his leg. The producer assured the actor, "It'll be absolutely safe". McCloskey agreed, and when he arrived on set the following day, he observed "three rows of plexiglass in front of everything and everyone is wearing hard hats. I'm the only guy standing on the other side of this! ... Needless to say, I did it all on instinct ... I still feel that blast of the door blowing by me. When they tell you in words, it's one thing, but when you feel that glass go flying past you with a sound like a Harrier jet, you never forget it!"

=== Music ===
Dario Argento chose progressive rocker Keith Emerson to compose Inferno's soundtrack because he "wanted a different sort of score [from that by Italian prog group Goblin on Suspiria], a more delicate one".

Argento prominently featured a selection from Giuseppe Verdi's Nabucco throughout Inferno, the Chorus of the Hebrew Slaves ("Va, pensiero, sull'ali dorate"), an operatic chestnut, from scene two of the opera's third act. In two instances, a recording of the Sinphonic [sic] Orchestra and Chorus of Rome was used. (Note: Per the Inferno end film credits, taken from the Anchor Bay Entertainment DVD.) Argento also tasked Emerson with including the piece in his soundtrack. He re-orchestrated "Va, pensiero..." in five-four time to mimic a "fast and bumpy" taxi ride through Rome. When Argento reviewed Emerson's progress he did not initially recognize the remix, but was later pleased to discover it was used for Sara's taxi ride.

A soundtrack album was originally released as an LP in 1980 on Atlantic Records (K 50753), and by the Cinevox label in 1981. In 2000, Cinevox released an expanded version of the album on CD. In 2018, Waxwork Records released the complete soundtrack on a double LP.

Emerson's music met with a mixed response from critics, some of whom compared it unfavorably to Goblin's score for Suspiria. Time Out's Scott Meek noted that "Argento's own over-the-top score [for Suspiria] has been replaced by religioso thunderings from the keyboards of Keith Emerson". A review of the 2000 Cinevox CD by AllMusic notes, "The keyboard selections are rather unremarkable, except for the finale, "Cigarettes, Ice, Etc.", on which Emerson uses his full keyboard arsenal to excellent effect."

== Release ==
Inferno was distributed in Italy by 20th Century-Fox, released on 8 February 1980. For reasons never specified, Fox did not commit to a wide theatrical release of Inferno in the United States. In an interview with Maitland McDonagh, Argento speculated that Fox's decision was made due to an abrupt change in management at the studio that left Inferno and several dozen other films in limbo as a result of them having been greenlit by the previous management. The film opened theatrically in England in September 1980, and in Australia in November 1980.

On 15 August 1986, it had a belated U.S. theatrical release by Fox, playing for a one-week engagement at New York City's Thalia Soho theater as part of a double feature with The Shining (1980). Worldwide, the film only had a very abbreviated and minimal theatrical release. As noted by Argento, "I think anybody outside of Italy was lucky to see Inferno." Consequently, Inferno was not a commercial success.

=== Home media ===
In the United Kingdom, Inferno was released on Betamax, VHS and Video 2000 formats in 1982. The film received a VHS release in the United States in October 1985 for the Halloween season via 20th Century-Fox's Key Video subsidiary.

Anchor Bay Entertainment released the film on DVD as a standalone disc in 2000, followed by a double-feature "Dario Argento Collection" edition in 2001, paired with Phenomena (1985). The film was released on DVD in Italy in 2007. Arrow Films released Inferno on Blu-ray in the United Kingdom in August 2010. In France, the film was released on Blu-ray in 2010. In 2011, Blue Underground issued the film on Blu-ray in the United States. In 2012, the film received its first official German-language DVD and Blu-ray release in Austria. In 2018, a limited edition DVD and Blu-Ray was released in France with a 24-page book section.

In Japan, the film was released on DVD in 2014 with the 1988 TV Tokyo dub and commentary by Japanese filmmakers Yudai Yamaguchi and Noboru Iguchi. A two-disc Blu-ray was released in 2017 which contained the TBS and TV Tokyo dubs, as well as newly remastered HD video, English 7.1 and 5.1 audio options, and approximately 209 minutes of supplementary material, including interviews with Daria Nicolodi and a Q&A involving Irene Miracle and composer Keith Emerson.

== Reception ==
=== Box office ===
The film grossed a total of 1,331,763,000 Italian lire domestically (around $1.6 million at the time). The film had an initially promising box office with the films premiere in Rome having 500 tickets returned, as the venue was packed with audiences, even sitting on the floor of the theatre. Overall the film was the 14th highest grossing film in Italy in 1980 and eighth among the highest grossing films of that year.

=== Critical response ===
Initial critical response was fairly muted. Several reviewers expressed disappointment, comparing the film unfavorably to the much more bombastic Suspiria. In a review that was later reprinted in McDonagh's critically acclaimed Broken Mirrors/Broken Minds: The Dark Dreams of Dario Argento (1994), Variety said Inferno was a "lavish, no-holds-barred witch story whose lack of both logic and technical skill are submerged in the sheer energy of the telling", then complained that the film "fails mainly because it lacks restraint in setting up the terrifying moment, using close-ups and fancy camera angles gratuitously and with no relevance to the story." Tim Radford of The Guardian wrote: "This badly-dubbed sequel offers the mixture as before without the style or economy of its predecessor. Buckets of full frontal gore, spooky interiors, an idiotic narrative and a risible script: a shambles of a film in all senses."

Reviewing the film during its brief theatrical release in 1986, Nina Darnton of The New York Times noted, "The movie's distinguishing feature is not the number or variety of horrible murders, but the length of time it takes for the victims to die. This is a technique that may have been borrowed from Italian opera, but without the music, it loses some of its panache. The film ... is shot in vivid colors, at some striking angles, and the background music is Verdi rather than heavy metal. But the script and acting are largely routine." However, Cinefantastique described the film as "the stuff of all our worst dreams and nightmares and a tour de force from Italian director Dario Argento ... Inferno brings his personal redefinition of the genre close to perfection."

Inferno continues to have a mixed critical reputation, though it has been noted for its surreal visual elements, use of color, and atmosphere. On the review aggregator website Rotten Tomatoes, 65% of 17 critics' reviews are positive, with an average rating of 5.5/10. Metacritic, which uses a weighted average, assigned the film a score of 69 out of 100, based on 8 critics, indicating "generally favorable" reviews.

Leonard Maltin's Movie Guide gave the film two and a half stars and opined it was a "surreal, hypnotic shocker ... short on sense, but long on style." But several critics have praised the film. Upon its initial release on videotape, Tim Lucas in The Video Watchdog Book said, "The movie is terrific, much more exciting than most contemporary horror video releases ..." Kim Newman, in The Penguin Encyclopedia of Horror and the Supernatural, noted that Inferno was "a dazzling series of set pieces designed to give the impression that the real world is terrifying, beautiful, erotic and dangerous ... Inferno is a masterpiece of absolute film, and perhaps the most underrated horror movie of the 1980s." In 2013, Time Out compiled a list of the 100 greatest horror films ever made based on the top ten lists of over one hundred film directors, screenwriters, and critics, and Inferno was listed as No. 92; in the resulting critical commentary for the film, Nigel Floyd wrote, "Horror cinema at its most baroque: a simple libretto is embroidered with elaborate, flowing camera movements, abstract blocks of colour, unsettling sound effects and soundtrack composer Keith Emerson's thunderous rock variations on Verdi ... Argento's best work is far behind him, but this alone justifies his cult reputation."

== Legacy ==
John Carpenter used Inferno as an inspiration for Prince of Darkness (1987). Carpenter said that he was inspired by the film's narrative freedom and Argento's willingness to let imagination drive the story, prompting him to take a similarly unrestricted approach to his own film.

Inferno influenced Hélène Cattet and Bruno Forzani's experimental horror film Amer (2009). The filmmakers described Inferno as a major influence on the film's writing, particularly Argento's use of subconscious associations and dream logic. Forzani said that Argento had explained his writing process for Inferno to him, which influenced their approach to Amer. Forzani later cited Inferno when discussing The Strange Colour of Your Body's Tears (2013), particularly its treatment of the apartment building as a character within the film.

== Sources ==
- Cooper, L. Andrew (2012). Dario Argento. Urbana, Illinois: University of Illinois Press. ISBN 978-0-252-09438-5.
- Curti, Roberto (2019). Italian Gothic Horror Films, 1980-1989. Jefferson, North Carolina: McFarland. ISBN 978-1476672434.
- Gallant, Chris, ed. (2000). Art of Darkness: The Cinema of Dario Argento. Guildford, England: FAB Press. ISBN 978-0-9529260-9-2.
- Jones, Alan (2004). Profondo Argento: The Man, the Myths and the Magic. Godalming, England: FAB Press. ISBN 978-1-903-25423-3.
- Lucas, Tim (1992). The Video Watchdog Book. Video Watchdog. ISBN 978-0-963-37560-5.
- Lucas, Tim (2007). Mario Bava: All the Colors of the Dark. Video Watchdog. ISBN 978-0-9633756-1-2.
- Maltin, Leonard (2014). Leonard Maltin's Movie Guide 2015. New York: Plume Books. ISBN 978-0-14-218176-8.
- McDonagh, Maitland (2010) [1994]. Broken Mirrors/Broken Minds: The Dark Dreams of Dario Argento (Expanded ed.). Minneapolis, Minnesota: University of Minnesota Press. ISBN 978-1-452-91537-1.
- Palmerini, Luca M.; Mistretta, Gaetano (1996). Spaghetti Nightmares: Italian Fantasy-horrors as Seen Through the Eyes of Their Protagonists. Key West, Florida: Fantasma Books. ISBN 978-0-963-49827-4.
- Newman, Kim (1986). Sullivan, Jack (ed.). The Penguin Encyclopedia of Horror and the Supernatural. Viking Penguin Inc. ISBN 0-670-80902-0.
- Kerekes, David; Slater, David (2005). See No Evil: Banned Films and Video Controversy. London: Headpress. ISBN 978-1-900-48610-1.
