= Autobiographic Sketches =

Book by Thomas de Quincey

Autobiographic Sketches, sometimes referred to as the Autobiography of Thomas De Quincey, is a work first published in 1853.

== Origins ==
“Sketches” suggests the mode of composition of this work. De Quincey did not deliberately plan and forthwith compose his autobiography. Rather he began by contributing reminiscent articles to periodicals, a practice which he continued until he had written and published about 30 essays. In 1853, he collected these articles, revised, enlarged and polished them with his customary diligence, and gave them to the public under the title Autobiographic Sketches.

== Content ==
However, Sketches does not contain all of De Quincey's autobiographical work: it must be supplemented by a large amount of his other reminiscent composition, particularly by the Confessions of an English Opium-Eater, by The English Mail-Coach, and by that noteworthy series of papers included under the general title, Suspiria de Profundis. In truth, all of these compositions might, with entire propriety, be included under the title Autobiographic Sketches. As a matter of fact, the autobiography of De Quincey, more than that of almost anyone else, is fragmentary — a succession of sketches loosely connected and widely scattered. De Quincey lived from early childhood in a dream world; the record of his successive dreams constitutes his true inner autobiography.

De Quincey might have written an objective account of the outward events of his life, and thus have attained a brevity and a form such as David Hume attained in his autobiographic sketch. De Quincey did not do this, and, in consequence, his spirit is communicated. Apart from their value as a revelation of De Quincey's soul, the Autobiographic Sketches are remarkable from a purely literary point of view. To be sure, they exhibit both the defects and the virtues of De Quincey's style. At one time, the author's “impassioned prose” flows swiftly; at another, almost uninteresting narrative is becalmed in sluggish prose. In general, however, the style is of high quality and the narrative compelling.

De Quincey's account of his visit “about an hour after high noon” to the chamber where his little sister lay dead is memorable, as is his account of the Sunday mornings when he went with his family to a “church having all things ancient and venerable, and the proportions majestic,” and of his stay at “Oxford, ancient mother, hoary with ancestral honors.” The appeal of the whole series is strong, and most readers that return to these Sketches frequently to commune with the strange elfin spirit of De Quincey, to pass under the spell of the “organ music” of his rhetoric, to feel something of that “mighty and essential solitude” which, in the words of the author, “stretches out a sceptre of fascination.”
