= Mother of Tears =

2007 film by Dario Argento

- Theatrical release poster
- Italian: La Terza madre
- Directed by: Dario Argento
- Screenplay by: Dario Argento; Jace Anderson; Adam Gierasch
- Story by: Dario Argento
- Based on: Suspiria de Profundis by Thomas De Quincey
- Produced by: Dario Argento; Claudio Argento
- Starring: Asia Argento; Cristian Solimeno; Adam James; Moran Atias; Valeria Cavalli; Philippe Leroy; Daria Nicolodi; Coralina Cataldi-Tassoni; Udo Kier
- Cinematography: Frederic Fasano
- Edited by: Walter Fasano
- Music by: Claudio Simonetti
- Production companies: Medusa Film; Myriad Pictures; Opera Film
- Distributed by: Medusa Distribuzione (Italy); Myriad Pictures (United States)
- Release dates: 6 September 2007 (TIFF); 24 October 2007 (Italy); 6 June 2008 (United States)
- Running time: 102 minutes
- Countries: Italy; United States
- Languages: English; Italian
- Budget: $3.5 million
- Box office: $3.1 million

Mother of Tears (Italian: La Terza madre; lit. 'The Third Mother') is a 2007 supernatural horror film written and directed by Dario Argento, and starring Asia Argento, Daria Nicolodi, Moran Atias, Udo Kier and Coralina Cataldi-Tassoni. The film has also been billed in English-speaking media as Mater Lachrymarum, The Third Mother (English translation of the film's original Italian title) and Mother of Tears: The Third Mother.

Written by Argento, Jace Anderson and Adam Gierasch, the film is the concluding installment of Argento's supernatural horror trilogy The Three Mothers, preceded by Suspiria (1977) and Inferno (1980). The film depicts the confrontation with the final "Mother" witch, known as Mater Lachrymarum.

== Plot ==
Catholic Church workers dig up the body of a 19th-century church official, whose casket has a box-shaped urn chained to it. Inside they discover artifacts of Mater Lachrymarum, the last surviving member of the Three Mothers, an ancient trio of powerful witches. The box contains a magic tunic that, when worn by Mater Lachrymarum, increases her powers significantly.

The urn is shipped to the Museum of Ancient Art in Rome, where Sarah Mandy, an American studying art restoration, works. Sarah is dating the curator Michael Pierce, a single father who is away from the museum that night. With help from the assistant curator Giselle, Sarah opens the box and finds the tunic. While Sarah is retrieving translation tools from her office, Giselle is attacked by the demonic agents of Mater Lachrymarum. Sarah returns to find Giselle disembowelled and tries to flee the museum. She is pursued by Mater Lachrymarum's familiar, but manages to escape when a disembodied voice guides her through locked doors that are magically thrown open.

Sarah tells the police what happened, then spends the night with Michael and his son. Meanwhile, in her lair, Mater Lachrymarum dons the tunic. The next day, Michael visits the Cardinal who sent the urn to the museum, but the Cardinal has had a severe stroke and is now comatose. Michael is given a message the Cardinal had been writing when he collapsed; the paper contains the scrawled name "Mater Lachrymarum." A pair of witches observe Michael as he leaves.

In Rome, chaos descends as a wave of mass suicides, murder, and violence engulfs the city. After his son is kidnapped by witches, Michael contacts Sarah. Sarah begs him to call the police, but Michael refuses and instead plans to visit a local priest who is an exorcist. En route, Michael is captured and murdered by the witches. His captive son is killed and cannibalized by the rapidly expanding coven.

As she makes her way through a train station, Sarah is spotted by a gang of witches who have arrived in Rome in order to pledge their loyalty to Mater Lachrymarum. Pursued by the witches as well as police detective Enzo Marki, Sarah escapes when the disembodied voice from before teaches her to make herself invisible.

Sarah meets Marta, a white witch and friend of Sarah's deceased mother Elisa. Marta realizes that the disembodied voice guiding Sarah is Elisa, who was herself a powerful white witch. Elisa challenged and severely wounded Mater Suspiriorum, the eldest and wisest of the Three Mothers, who retaliated by causing the crash that killed Sarah's parents. Though Mater Suspiriorum was killed by Suzy Bannion, a ballet dancer in Freiburg (Note: As depicted in Suspiria (1977).) and her sister Mater Tenebrarum was killed by Mark Elliott in New York (Note: As depicted in Inferno (1980).), Mater Lachrymarum aims to bring about the second age of magic, with the fall of Rome being her first goal.

Sarah returns to her home in the city but observes Mater Lachrymarum's forces waiting for her. She heads for Marta's house and discovers Marta and her lover murdered. Fleeing, Sarah spots Michael, who takes her back to his apartment. Sarah soon realizes that Michael is a corpse being animated by Mater Lachrymarum. Sarah burns Michael's animated body, and the ghost of her mother intervenes one final time to banish Michael to Hell.

Sarah locates De Witt, an alchemist whom Marta mentioned as someone who could help her against Mater Lachrymarum. De Witt gives Sarah a copy of "The Three Mothers" to read, enabling her to find Mater Lachrymarum's lair. Enzo Marki, the police detective who has been tailing Sarah, joins her to venture into the catacombs where Mater Lachrymarum's cult lurks. Enzo is separated from Sarah and captured and tortured, along with De Witt. Sarah is caught and brought before Mater Lachrymarum, who is wearing the ancient tunic. Sarah heals Enzo's wounds and uses a spear to pull the tunic off Mater Lachrymarum. She tosses the tunic into a nearby brazier, causing the lair to collapse and a pillar to impale and kill Mater Lachrymarum. With the followers crushed as the catacomb collapses, Sarah and Enzo struggle back above ground and laugh in horror and relief.

== Cast ==
- Asia Argento as Sarah Mandy
- Cristian Solimeno as Detective Enzo Marchi
- Daria Nicolodi as Elisa Mandy, Sarah's deceased mother and the witch
- Udo Kier as Padre Johannes
- Moran Atias as Mater Lachrymarum
- Adam James as Michael Pierce
- Coralina Cataldi Tassoni as Giselle Mares
- Philippe Leroy as Guglielmo De Witt
- Valeria Cavalli as Marta Colussi, Elisa's friend and witch
- Clive Riche as man in overcoat
- Massimo Sarchielli as the hobo
- Silvia Rubino as Elga
- Jun Ichikawa as Katerina
- Luca Pescatore as Paul Pierce

== Production ==
=== Pre-production ===
==== The Three Mothers trilogy ====
Mother of Tears is the final film in Argento's trilogy known as The Three Mothers. The trilogy is loosely based on characters from "Levana and Our Ladies of Sorrow", a section of Thomas De Quincey's Suspiria de Profundis. The prose poem outlines the existence of three women that are the personification of sorrow: Mater Lachrymarum, Mater Suspiriorum and Mater Tenebrarum. Argento and Daria Nicolodi recast De Quincey's Three Sorrows as three malevolent witches who rule the world with tears, sighs and shadows. When released in 1977, the first film, Suspiria, introduced the major stylistic elements of the series, including the bold use of primary colors and elaborate setpieces for each murder. The sequel, Inferno, developed the overarching plot continuities concerning the three central witches when released in 1980.

==== Nicolodi script (1980s) ====
As early as 1984, Daria Nicolodi asserted in an interview with Fangoria – alongside Argento – that they had "finished the script for the third [film] but there are a few things we are still working on to perfect the project, a couple of special effects and locations, that sort of thing." Although Nicolodi mentioned her version of the script again in an interview for Alan Jones' book, Profondo Argento: The Man, the Myths and the Magic, it was not used in whole or part for Mother of Tears.

==== Argento script (2003/4) ====
On 29 November 2003, at the Trieste Science Plus Fiction Festival in Northern Italy, Argento revealed that he hoped to start filming The Third Mother in August 2004 and was currently working on the script. Thematically it concerned "mysticism, alchemy, terrorism and Gnosticism [...]. So many people were tortured because the Church said Gnosticism was heresy, and that will be the starting point for the story. [...] It has been over 20 years since I left the Three Mothers behind [...] and it has felt surprisingly good to go back and explore the whole story from a retrospective point of view." The film was to be set in Rome and begin with Mater Lachrymarum in the Middle Ages. Argento originally hoped to cast a Russian model in the role of Mater Lachrymarum. (He later chose Israeli actress Moran Atias.) Argento also said that a Hollywood studio might finance the film.

==== Anderson and Gierasch script (2005–06) ====
In late 2005, Argento travelled to the North of Europe to begin conceptual work on The Third Mother. Soon after, it was announced that Jace Anderson and Adam Gierasch had been asked by Argento to help him write the film's script. "When we got there [Rome,] Dario had already done his own pass on the treatment, and we spent three weeks holed up in an apartment, meeting with Dario, visiting the catacombs, and getting the first draft done." Around this time, Fangoria reported that the film would be entitled Mater Lachrymarum.

The script for The Third Mother was still being refined in February 2006, with Anderson and Gierasch having composed a first draft which Argento then revised. This early script began immediately after Inferno, with a witch who survived the destruction of Mater Tenebrarum's home watching a detective (Ennio Fantastichini) investigating a series of murders at a university. Other tentative cast members were Chiara Caselli as a psychiatrist, Max von Sydow as a mysterious university professor, and Giordano Petri as a young investigator who takes the case when Fantastichini's character is killed. At this point, shooting was set to begin in late spring of the same year and was to be released between November 2006 and January 2007. However, in early 2006 rumors circulated that Argento had dismissed Anderson and Gierasch after being displeased with their script. French horror magazine L'Écran Fantastique reported that Argento alone would receive a screenwriting credit. On the tenth of March it was announced that shooting The Third Mother would be delayed until September. In mid-April it was announced that Argento would return to Italy in June to immediately begin filming The Third Mother, which would be "a big budget feature, produced by Medusa along with a major American company [Myriad]." In May 2006 the title Mother of Tears surfaced as a possible name for the film. According to journalist Alan Jones, this title "was never in the running as far as Dario was concerned. That was the title the originally contacted American sales agent Myriad wanted for international distribution." In the same month, rumors from the Cannes Film Festival linked actress Sienna Miller to the film's lead female role. Also at Cannes, Medusa's CEO Giampaolo Letta was quoted by Anderson and Gierasch as saying "This is going to be vintage Argento. Pretty strong stuff." In July it was revealed that The Third Mother had been delayed yet again until "next November or later" and that Argento's daughter, Asia, had been cast in the film.

=== Filming ===
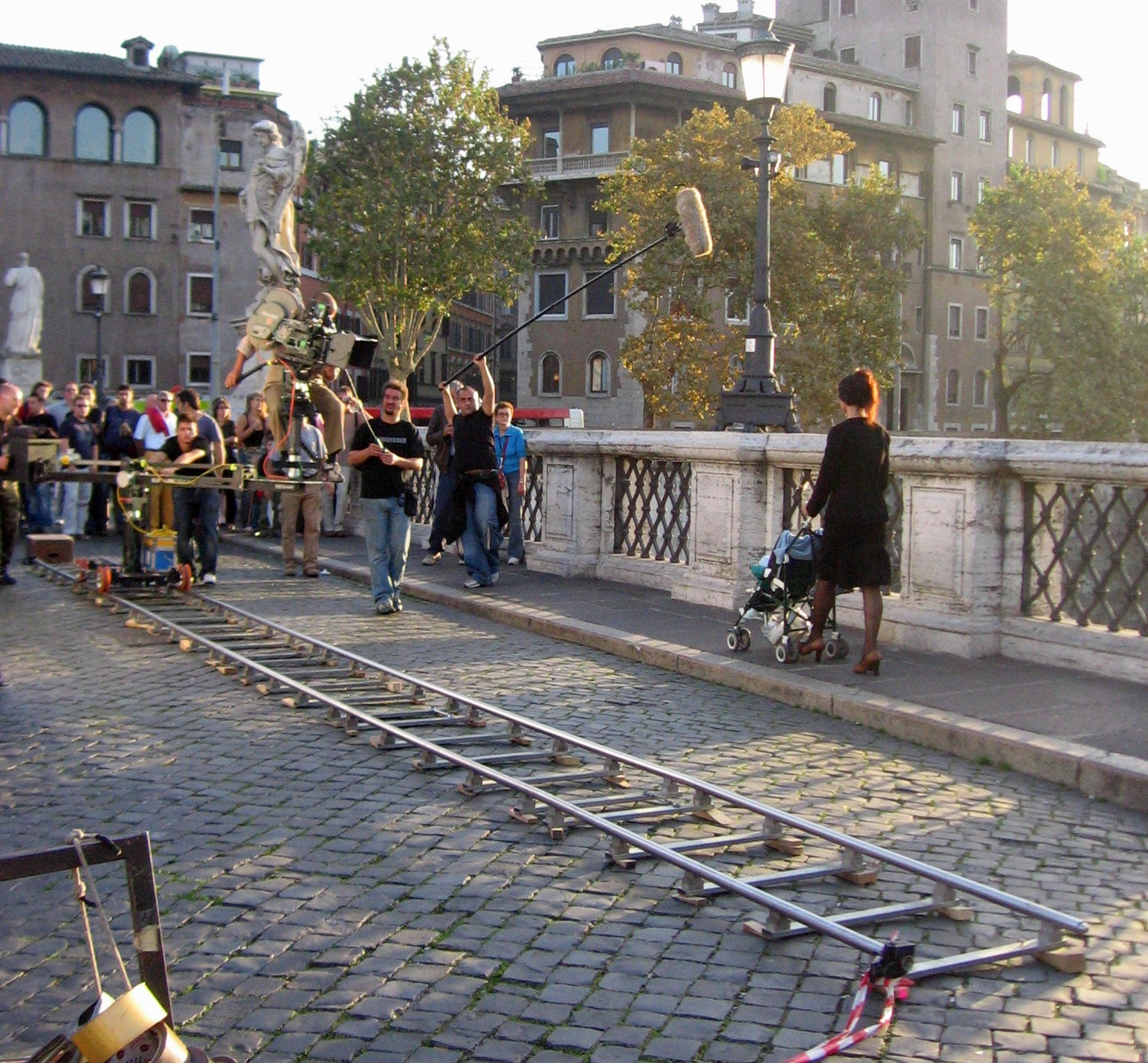
Primary filming in Rome on 25 October 2006. In this scene, a mother throws her baby from a bridge in a fit of aberration brought on by the return of the Third Mother

In mid-October 2006, Gierasch revealed that The Third Mother would begin filming later in the month. Primary filming occurred in Rome, although some parts were filmed in Turin and at the Cinecittà studios in Terni.

=== Post-production ===
The editing of Mother of Tears was more or less finished by March 2007. Dubbing the soundtrack into the Italian and English language versions of the film was finished on 5 April 2007.

The film's digital effects were created by Lee Wilson and Sergio Stivaletti. According to the director of photography, Frederic Fasano, the film will begin with a subdued cool color palette that will segue to red as the film progresses.

The Italian distributor of Mother of Tears, Medusa Film, believed the film was too violent and requested it to be edited. Medusa's main objection is to "the depiction of perverse sex in the witch gathering satanic scenes and one cannibal killing of a major character." Argento was asked to re-edit the film to make it more mainstream. It was confirmed on 28 May 2007 that the film would receive a rating of 14 in Italy, necessitating the removal of "all hardcore gore" which would later "be re-instated for the dvd release".

== Promotion ==
Promotion of Mother of Tears before Cannes 2007 was limited. Several behind-the-scenes photographs surfaced, the first official one at Fangoria on 27 November 2006. A short, eighteen-second preview of The Third Mother was released on 18 December 2006 at Cinecitta.com. Several black-and-white photographs of the filming were published on 19 January 2007 in the book Dario Argento et le cinéma by Bernard Joisten. In May 2007, just before the event at Cannes, a promotional poster for The Third Mother was featured on the cover of Variety magazine's digital edition. Mother of Tears premiered at the Toronto International Film Festival on 6 September 2007, just moments before midnight and Argento's 67th birthday (though the pre-film introductions pushed the start until after midnight when the programmer noted that it was now the 7th and Argento's birthday. He then led the auditorium in a chorus of "Happy Birthday."). The film debuted in Italy on 24 October 2007 at the Rome Film Festival. Its Italian wide release occurred on 31 October 2007, Halloween. In the United States, Myriad Pictures released the film uncut in select cities in June 2008.

=== Cannes 2007 ===
The Cannes Film Festival requested that The Third Mother be ready in time for consideration as a 2007 competition contender. However, the film was not screened in its entirety at the festival. On 17 May 2007 at 9:30 am Myriad premiered 20 minutes of footage from the film, consisting of eight lengthy scenes, to a packed audience. The preview was preceded by a credit roll and disclaimer that warned of graphic violence. The eight scenes included: the complete beginning to the point where Asia opens the Mother of Tears urn, the arrival of several demons, Daria Nicolodi's "powder puff" scene, a lesbian death scene, Udo Kier's major scene, Asia running through the streets of Rome, Adam James' major scene, and the entrance of Mater Lachrymarum. According to reporter Alan Jones the audiences' reaction was mixed: the acting quality varied and the script contained too much exposition, but the cinematography was beautiful.

=== Post-Cannes ===
The day after the Cannes screening, on 18 May at 3:45 pm, co-scripter Jace Anderson and actress Coralina Cataldi-Tassoni were on The Third Mother discussion panel at Fangoria's Weekend of Horrors convention on the West Coast. On 27 May, a second promotional poster – featuring an eye weeping tears of blood – surfaced on the internet bearing only the title Mother of Tears. In early June, a teaser trailer for The Third Mother was attached to Grindhouse in Italy. Camera-recorded copies of the trailer surfaced soon afterward on the internet. The Cannes promo reel was also screened during Fangoria's Weekend of Horrors East Coast convention in Secaucus, New Jersey on 1 July at 12:15 pm Cataldi-Tassoni introduced the footage. Pirated stills and audio from the preview surfaced the same day on the forum of the Dario Argento fansite DarkDreams.org. In late August, an American trailer for the film was screened at the Rue Morgue Festival of Fear.

=== US release ===
The film had its US premiere at the San Francisco International Film Festival on 25 April 2008. This was followed by a limited theatrical run in June courtesy of Myriad Pictures and a DVD release by The Weinstein Company via Dimension Extreme DVDs on 23 September 2008.

== Reception ==
=== Critical response ===
Critical response was mixed, although many reviewers felt the film, despite its flaws, was entertaining. The review aggregator website Rotten Tomatoes reports a 47% approval rating based on 68 reviews, with an average rating of 5.4/10. The website's critics consensus reads, "As excessive and ketchup laden as predecessors Suspiria and Inferno, Dario Argento's Mother of Tears completes the trilogy with the same baroque grandeur and soggy 1970s sensibilities." On Metacritic, the film has a score of 52 out of 100 based on 18 critics, indicating "mixed or average reviews". The concluding film of The Three Mothers trilogy provided some reviewers with an opportunity to reflect on Argento's career as a whole, and parallels were often drawn between Mother of Tears and Argento's films from the 1970s and 1980s.

Variety's Dennis Harvey wrote, "This hectic pileup of supernatural nonsense is a treasure trove of seemingly unintentional hilarity...this "Mother" is a cheesy, breathless future camp classic." Stephanie Zacharek of Salon.com opined that "Mother of Tears is depraved, bloody and unrepentantly exploitive, and the plot makes virtually no sense—it's the sort of movie nobody, save Argento himself, is crazy enough to make these days. It's also so full of life that it dwarfs contemporary horror pictures of the Saw and Hostel variety." Jim Ridley in The Village Voice felt the film was further evidence of the declining quality of a once great director's abilities, stating that "for people who revere the horror maestro's vital work—roughly the period between his debut, 1970's proto–De Palma giallo The Bird with the Crystal Plumage, and his 1990 segment of the anthology film Two Evil Eyes — it's painful to watch the Hieronymus Bosch of '70s horror sink this low...If you believe someone of Dario Argento's proven talent would make a movie so deliberately sucky, feel free to join in." Maitland McDonagh of Film Journal International panned the film, describing it as "sadly lacking in the baroque atmosphere and visual aesthetic that elevated Argento above the horror hacks—it's flatly lit, indifferently staged, coarsely violent and brutally straightforward. The English-language dubbing is the final indignity: even the voices are ugly."

Writing in The New York Times, Nathan Lee described the film as "...silly, awkward, vulgar, outlandish, hysterical, inventive, revolting, flamboyant, titillating, ridiculous, mischievous, uproarious, cheap, priceless, tasteless and sublime...[I]t may be the most entertaining film of [Argento's] career...It's true that The Mother of Tears, strictly as visual storytelling, suffers by comparison with the first and second Mother movies, or one of Mr. Argento's better baroque thrillers, like The Bird with the Crystal Plumage. But it does something as well as, if not better than, anything in his oeuvre: it goes all the way." Scooter McCrae of Fangoria was extremely enthusiastic about the film, and said that "Mother of Tears is a great movie, and well worth the wait. Does it have flaws? Oh yeah, but so do Tenebrae, Phenomena, Suspiria and Inferno, and they're now all part of the accepted canon of classic Argento cinema." Cinefantastique's Steve Biodrowski also felt the film was worthy of praise, noting that "the experience of watching Mother of Tears is like a delirious descent into primordial chaos, where the powers of darkness hold sway...As a long-awaited coda to Argento's "Three Mothers" trilogy, [it] may not be exactly what was expected, but it is perfectly satisfying resolution...."

Argento has noted that he is dismissive of critical reaction, saying that "the critics don't understand very well. But critics are not important – absolutely not important. Because now audiences don't believe anymore in critics. Many years ago critics wrote long articles about films. Now in seven lines they are finished: 'The story is this. The actor is this. The color is good.'"

=== Box office performance ===
In Italy, La Terza madre generated $827,000 in two days at 273 theaters. By the end of its opening week in 303 theaters it had amassed $1,917,934 and took the 4th spot at the Italian box office. To date it has taken 2,077,000 Euros ($3,114,070). During its first week of limited theatrical release in the United States, Mother of Tears grossed $19,418 at seven theaters, for a per theater gross of $2,774, taking 55th place on Variety's weekly box office chart.

== Soundtrack ==
Claudio Simonetti composed the soundtrack for Mother of Tears, which was completed in early April 2007 after four months of work. He chose a classical style with Gothic influences present in many of the choruses. Simonetti described the score as "very different" from his previous work due to the subject matter of the film. The music was influenced by his own work for Argento's Masters of Horror episodes ("Jenifer" and "Pelts") as well as composers such as Carl Orff, Jerry Goldsmith, and Bernard Herrmann (among others). The score also incorporates electronic music and influences from Simonetti's earlier work on Argento films, such as Suspiria and Phenomena.

The piece at the end of Simonetti's "Mater Lachrimarum" is called "Dulcis in Fondo" and was performed by his heavy metal band, Daemonia. Cradle of Filth frontman Dani Filth recorded a song with Simonetti, Mater Lacrimarum, for the soundtrack of the film.

The soundtrack was recorded in the Acquario Studio of Castelnuovo in Porto-Roma. The symphonic orchestra parts were performed by the Orchestra D.I.M.I. The choral parts were performed by the Nova Lyrica chorus in February 2007. Both were recorded in Lead Studios in Rome with the help of sound-man Giuseppe Ranieri. Filmmakers finished dubbing the soundtrack into the film on 5 April 2007. At the preview during the Cannes Film Festival, journalist Alan Jones described Simonetti's score as an "unqualified success".

The soundtrack was released around the same time as the film's Italian wide release (31 October 2007) by Edel Music.
