= Suspiria de Profundis =

1845 book by Thomas de Quincey

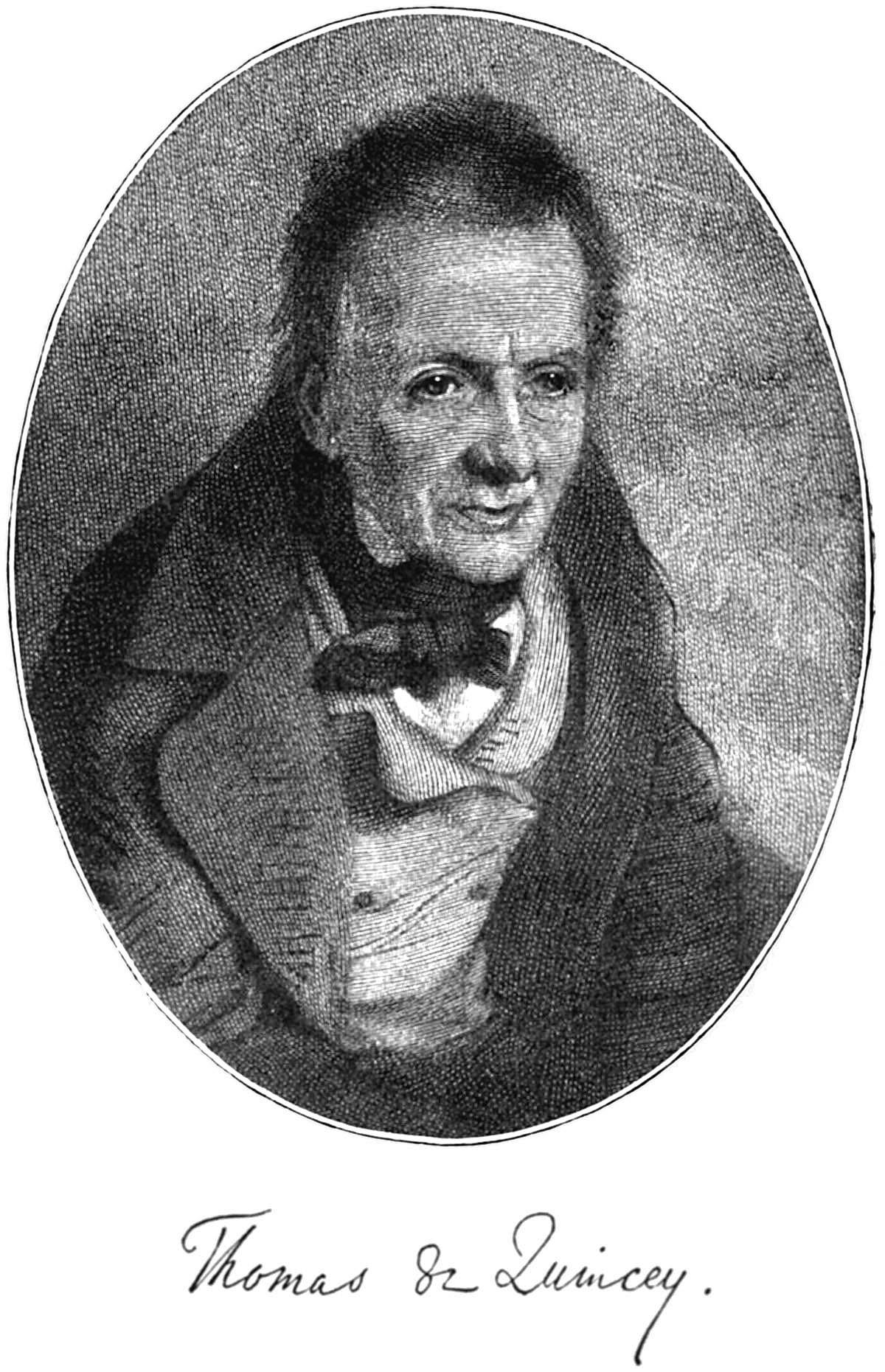
Thomas De Quincey

Suspiria de profundis (a Latin phrase meaning "sighs from the depths") is a collection of essays in the form of prose poems by English writer Thomas De Quincey, first published in 1845. An examination of the process of memory as influenced by hallucinogenic drug use, Suspiria has been described as one of the best-known and most distinctive literary works of its era.

== Genre ==
First published in fragmentary form in 1845, the work is a collection of short essays in psychological fantasy — what De Quincey himself called "impassioned prose," and what is now termed prose poetry. The essays of the Suspiria "are among the finest examples of De Quincey's or anyone else's English style."

De Quincey conceived of the collection as a sequel to his masterwork, Confessions of an English Opium-Eater (1821). Like that work, the pieces in Suspiria de Profundis are rooted in the visionary experiences of the author's opium addiction.

== Publication ==
De Quincey left the work incomplete in its original publication in Blackwood's Magazine, in the spring and summer of 1845. He altered its content and added material when he included it in his collected works (1854 and after); and portions of the whole were not published until the first volume of his Posthumous Works in 1891.

Among De Quincey's papers, left after his death in 1859, was discovered a list of 32 items that would have comprised the complete Suspiria, if the work had ever been finished. This master list counts The English Mail-Coach, first published in Blackwood's in October and December 1849, as one of the Suspiria, though critics and scholars universally treat it as a separate work. The long essay The Affliction of Childhood, also on the master list, is more often associated with the Suspiria, since it too was printed in Blackwood's in the Spring of 1845. The Affliction contains De Quincey's childhood recollections of the death of his sister, Elizabeth Quincey (aged 9) who died of meningitis. Yet for the most part, the Suspiria are commonly defined as relatively brief essays, including:

- Dreaming — the introduction to the whole.
- The Palimpsest of the Human Brain — a meditation upon the deeper layers of human consciousness and memory.
- Levana and Our Ladies of Sorrow — beginning with a discussion of Levana, the ancient Roman goddess of childbirth, De Quincey imagines three companions for her: Mater Lachrymarum, Our Lady of Tears; Mater Suspiriorum, Our Lady of Sighs; and Mater Tenebrarum, Our Lady of Darkness.
- The Apparition of the Brocken — on an optical illusion associated with a German mountaintop.
- Savannah-la-Mar — a threnody on a sunken city, inspired by the 1692 earthquake that sank Port Royal in Jamaica; beginning, "God smote Savannah-la-Mar...."
- Vision of Life — "The horror of life mixed...with the heavenly sweetness of life...."
- Memorial Suspiria — looking forwards and backwards on life's miseries; foreshadowing and anticipation.

When the collection was reprinted in the collected works in the 1850s, another short essay was added: The Daughter of Lebanon, a parable of grief and transcendence.

The four pieces that first appeared posthumously in 1891 are:

- Solitude of Childhood — "Fever and delirium," "sick desire," and the Erl-King's daughter.
- The Dark Interpreter — he was a looming shadow in the author's opium reveries.
- The Princess that lost a Single Seed of a Pomegranate — echoes upon echoes from an Arabian Nights tale.
- Who is this Woman that beckoneth and warneth me from the Place where she is, and in whose Eyes is Woeful remembrance? I guess who she is — "memorials of a love that has departed, has been — the record of a sorrow that is...."

Levana and Our Ladies of Sorrow is known as one of the most anthologized and widely known pieces in the collection. "The whole of this vision is clothed in a prose so stately, intense, and musical that it has been regarded by some...as the supreme achievement of De Quincey's genius, the most original thing he ever wrote."

== The lost Suspiria ==
Out of the 32 pieces on the Suspiria master list, 18 are not extant; they were either planned but never written, or written but lost before publication. (In his later years, De Quincey, working by candlelight, had an unfortunate propensity to set things — his papers; his hair — on fire.) The lost pieces bear evocative and provoking titles:

- The Dreadful Infant (There was the glory of innocence made perfect; there was the dreadful beauty of infancy that had seen God)
- Foundering Ships
- The Archbishop and the Controller of Fire
- God that didst Promise
- Count the Leaves in Vallombrosa
- But if I submitted with Resignation, not the less I searched for the Unsearchable — sometimes in Arab Deserts, sometimes in the Sea
- That ran before us in malice
- Morning of Execution
- Kyrie Eleison
- The Nursery in Arabian Deserts
- The Halcyon Calm and the Coffin
- Faces! Angels' Faces!
- At that Word
- Oh, Apothanate! that hatest death, and cleansest from the Pollution of Sorrow
- Who is this Woman that for some Months has followed me up and down? Her face I cannot see, for she keeps for ever behind me
- Cagot and Cressida
- Lethe and Anapaula
- Oh, sweep away, Angel, with Angelic Scorn, the Dogs that come with Curious Eyes to gaze.

A few pages of Notes for the missing Suspiria were found in the author's papers.

== Translation and adaptations ==
In 1860, Charles Baudelaire, inspired by Suspiria de Profundis and the Confessions, penned the first part of his essay Les paradis artificiels about hashish and opium and their effect on a poet's work. The second segment, entitled "Un mangeur d'Opium", is a translation to French of De Quincey's Confessions, with Baudelaire occasionally adding his own impressions.

Filmmaker Dario Argento and his wife at the time, actress/writer Daria Nicolodi, used De Quincey's Suspiria, particularly Levana and Our Ladies of Sorrow, as inspiration for "The Three Mothers" trilogy, which include Suspiria (1977), Inferno (1980) and Mother of Tears (2007). This influence carried over into Luca Guadagnino's 2018 remake of Suspiria. Although uncredited as writer, Nicolodi also used Levana and Our Ladies of Sorrow as inspiration for De Profundis in 1989, A.K.A. Demons 6: il gatto nero A.K.A. The Black Cat, directed by Luigi Cozzi.

Fritz Leiber's novel Our Lady of Darkness, published in 1977, the same year as Argento's Suspiria, quotes from Levana in the introduction, and references the third Mother in the course of the novel.
