= Les Paradis artificiels =

1860 book by Charles Baudelaire

Les Paradis Artificiels
- Author: Charles Baudelaire
- Language: French
- Subject: Recreational drug use
- Publisher: Auguste Poulet-Malassis
- Publication date: 1860
- Publication place: France

Les Paradis Artificiels (English: Artificial Paradises) is a book by French poet Charles Baudelaire, first published in 1860, about the state of being under the influence of opium and hashish. Baudelaire describes the effects of the drugs and discusses the way in which they could theoretically aid mankind in reaching an ideal world. The text was influenced by Thomas De Quincey's Confessions of an English Opium-Eater and Suspiria de Profundis. His longtime friend and colleague Gautier also wrote reminiscences about his experiences at the Club de Hashischins, held for a time at the Hotel Pîmodan, which is where he and Baudelaire first became acquainted.

Baudelaire analyzes the motivation of the addict, and the individual psychedelic experience of the user.

== Legacy ==
Baudelaire's descriptions of the hashish spell in Artificial Paradises foreshadowed other such work that emerged many decades later with intense scientific research into serotonergic psychedelics.

For example: Baudelaire's cycle of reflections on the drug by the subjects of his scholarship, inspired Walter Benjamin to engage in his own hashish and mescaline protocols later on.

A renaissance of interest in these early drug-experiments—inclusive of other more contemporary works by Aldous Huxley (Doors of Perception), Allen Ginsberg ("Lysergic Acid"), Aleister Crowley, Robert Graves, Timothy Leary, Ram Dass (formerly known as Richard Alpert), William S. Burroughs etc.--became an atmospheric element of the literature of the counter-culture during the 1960's in the European and American sphere.

== See also ==
- Confessions of an English Opium-Eater by Thomas De Quincey (1821)
- The Hasheesh Eater by Fitz Hugh Ludlow (1857)
- On Hashish by Walter Benjamin (mostly published posthumously)
- List of books about cannabis
