= The English Mail-Coach =

1849 essay by Thomas De Quincey

- Author: Thomas De Quincey
- Language: English
- Genre: Autobiography
- Published in: Blackwood's Edinburgh Magazine
- Publication date: 1849
- Media type: print

The English Mail-Coach is an essay by the English author Thomas De Quincey. A "three-part masterpiece" and "one of his most magnificent works," it first appeared in 1849 in Blackwood's Edinburgh Magazine, in the October (Part I) and December (Parts II and III) issues.

The essay is divided into three sections:

- Part I, "The Glory of Motion," is devoted to a lavish description of the mail coach system then in use in England, and the sensations of riding on the outside upper seats of the coaches (in the author's often opium-tinged perceptions). With many digressions (on subjects ranging from Chaucer's poetry to a comparison of the River Thames with the Mississippi), De Quincey discusses the "grandeur and power" of the mail-coach ride; prior to the invention of the railroad, the mail coach represented the ultimate in transportation, in speed and force and controlled energy. Perhaps the most memorable and frequently-cited portion of Part I is De Quincey's comparison of one veteran mail-coachman to a crocodile. The crocodile-coachman's pretty granddaughter is memorialized as "Fanny of the Bath Road."
  - The concluding portion of Part I is set apart under the subtitle "Going Down with Victory," and relates the author's sensations as the mail coaches spread news of English victories in the Napoleonic Wars across England — though simultaneously spreading grief, as women learn the fates of men lost in battle.
- Part II, "The Vision of Sudden Death," deals in great detail with a near-accident that occurred one night while De Quincey, intoxicated with opium, was riding on an outside seat of a mail coach. The driver fell asleep and the massive coach nearly collided with a gig bearing a young couple.
- Part III, "Dream Fugue, Founded on the Preceding Theme of Sudden Death," is devoted to De Quincey's opium dreams and reveries that elaborated on the elements of Parts I and II, the mail coaches, the near accident, national victory and grief. Beginning with a quotation from Paradise Lost and a clarion "Tumultuosissimamente", the author introduces his theme of sudden death, and relates five dreams or visions of intense and exalted emotion and radiant language.
  - I — At sea, a great English man-of-war encounters a graceful pinnace filled with young women, including one mysterious, recurring, archetypal figure from the narrator's visionary experience.
  - II — In a storm at sea, the man-of-war nearly collides with a frigate, the mysterious woman clinging among its shrouds.
  - III — At dawn, the narrator follows the woman along a beach, only to see her overwhelmed by shifting sands.
  - IV — The narrator finds himself borne with others in a "triumphal car," racing miles through the night as "restless anthems, and Te Deums reverberated from the choirs and orchestras of earth." The "secret word" — "Waterloo and Recovered Christendom!" — passes before them. The car enters an enormous cosmic cathedral; with three blasts from a Dying Trumpeter, the mysterious female reappears with a spectre of death and her "better angel," his face hidden in his wings.
  - V — With "heart-shattering music" from the "golden tubes of the organ," the cathedral is filled with re-awakened "Pomps of life." The living and the dead sing to God, and the woman enters "the gates of the golden dawn...."
- A "Postscript" concludes the whole and provides a conceptual frame for "This little paper," the unique literary artifact that precedes it.

The English Mail-Coach is one of De Quincey's endeavors at writing what he called "impassioned prose," like his Confessions of an English Opium-Eater and Suspiria de Profundis. De Quincey had originally intended The English Mail-Coach to be one part of the Suspiria.

Its literary quality and its unique nature have made The English Mail-Coach a central focus of De Quincey scholarship and criticism.
