= Daria Nicolodi =

Italian actress and screenwriter (1950–2020)

- Nicolodi in Tenebrae (1982)
- Born: 19 June 1950; Florence, Italy
- Died: 26 November 2020 (aged 70); Rome, Italy
- Occupations: Actress; screenwriter
- Years active: 1970–2020
- Partner(s): Mario Ceroli (1971–1974); Dario Argento (1974–1985)
- Children: Anna Ceroli; Asia Argento
- Relatives: Alfredo Casella (grandfather)

Daria Nicolodi (19 June 1950 – 26 November 2020) was an Italian television and film actress and screenwriter, and associated mostly with the films of director Dario Argento.

== Early life and career ==
Daria Nicolodi was born in Florence on 19 June 1950. Her father was a Florentine lawyer and her mother, Fulvia, was a scholar of ancient languages. Her maternal grandfather was composer Alfredo Casella. She moved to Rome in the late 1960s.

In 1970, she participated in the television variety show Babau which was shelved and only broadcast by RAI six years later. She made her screen debut the same year in Francesco Rosi's Many Wars Ago. In 1973, she starred in Elio Petri's Property Is No Longer a Theft. She also appeared in TV productions, such as the miniseries Nicotera, Without a Trace with Rossano Brazzi (1972), Portrait of a Veiled Woman with Nino Castelnuovo (1975), the drama Saturnino Farandola with Mariano Rigillo (1978), and Rosaura at 10 (1981).

Nicolodi starred in five films directed by Dario Argento between 1975 and 1987: Deep Red (1975), Inferno (1980), Tenebrae (1982), Phenomena (1985) and Opera (1987). She later stressed that the screenplays for Argento's Suspiria and Inferno owed many ideas to her authorship, but received writing credit only for the former. During this time, she also appeared in Shock, the final film of Italian horror director Mario Bava. After her relationship with Argento ended in 1985, Nicolodi participated in such films as Macaroni, Notes of Love and her daughter Asia Argento's Scarlet Diva. In 2007, Nicolodi worked with Asia on Dario Argento's Mother of Tears, the sequel to Suspiria and Inferno.

== Personal life and death ==
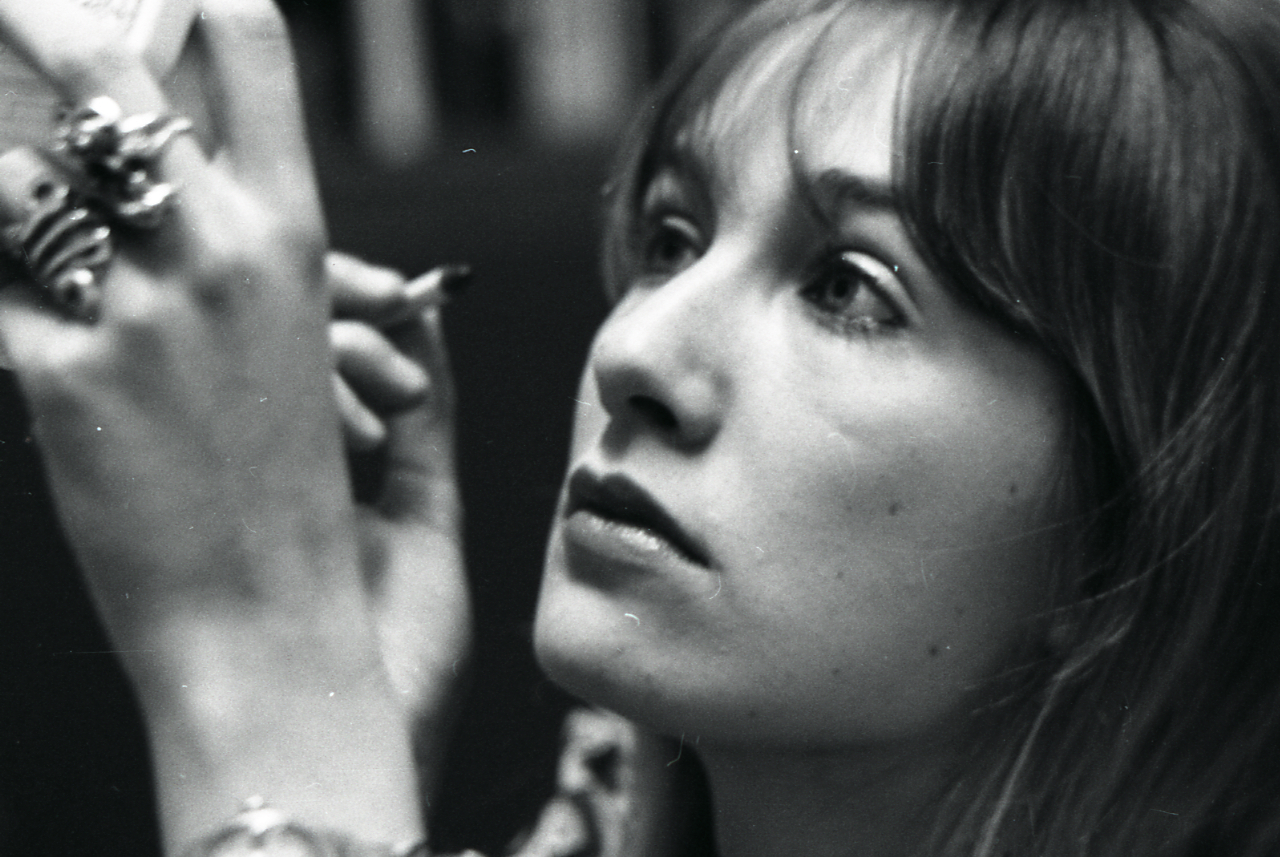
Nicolodi photographed by Paolo Monti in 1970.

In the early 1970s, she had a relationship with the sculptor Mario Ceroli. They had a daughter, Anna, who was born in 1972 and died in a 1994 traffic accident. Nicolodi had a professional and private relationship with director Dario Argento; they met in 1974 during casting for the film Deep Red, and their daughter Asia was born in 1975. They separated in 1985.

Nicolodi died in Rome on 26 November 2020 at the age of 70 from undisclosed causes.

== Legacy ==
In 2012, the retrospective Argento: Il Cinema Nel Sangue was held at the Museum of Arts and Design, New York. It highlighted Nicolodi's contribution to Dario Argento's films as well as that of his father (Salvatore), brother (Claudio) and daughter (Asia).

== Filmography ==
Film
Year	Title	Role	Notes
1970	Many Wars Ago	Red Cross nurse	Film debut
1972	Salomè	Unnamed role	
1973	Property Is No Longer a Theft	Anita	
1975	Deep Red	Gianna Brezzi	
1977	Suspiria	Woman at airport (uncredited)	Also writer (screenplay)
1977	Shock	Dora Baldini	
1980	Inferno	Elisa De Longvalle Adler	Also writer (story; uncredited)
1981	Il minestrone	Eleonora	
1982	Tenebrae	Anne	
1985	Phenomena	Frau Brückner	
1985	Macaroni	Laura Di Falco	
1987	Delirium	Evelyn	
1987	Opera	Mira	
1989	Sinbad of the Seven Seas	Narrator	
1989	Paganini Horror	Sylvia Hackett	Also writer (screenplay)
1989	The Black Cat	—N/a	Writer (uncredited)
1991	The Devil's Daughter	Unnamed role	
1992	The End Is Known	Avv. Mila	
1998	Viola Kisses Everybody	Sibilla	
1998	Notes of Love	Angela's mother	
2000	Scarlet Diva	Anna's mother	
2000	Rosa and Cornelia	Eleonora	
2004	Soleado (short film)	Ms. Fogoni	
2007	Mother of Tears	Elisa Mandy	

Television
Year	Title	Role	Notes
1972	I Nicotera	Alessandra	Miniseries (5 episodes)
1975	Ritratto di donna velata	Elisa	Miniseries (5 episodes)
1977	Saturnino Farandola	Unknown/unnamed role	Miniseries (4 episodes)
1978	Aspetterò	Eve Cresso	Television film
1979	I giochi del diavolo	Clara	Miniseries (1 episode)
1979	Tre ore dopo le nozze	Townley	Television film
1981	Rosaura alle 10	Unnamed/unknown role	Television film
1982	The Life of Verdi	Margherita Barezzi	Miniseries (9 episodes)
1985	Sogni e bisogni	Litizia	Miniseries (1 episode)
1987	Turno di notte	Unknown/unnamed role	Season 1 (guest role – 1 episode)
1991	Adventures of the Little Mermaid	Narrator/Queen Camilla (voice)	Italian dub; Season 1 (26 episodes)
1999	Alta tensione	Preside	Miniseries (1 episode)
2009	Inspector Coliandro	Professor Moline	Season 3 (guest role – 1 episode)
2009	Il mostro di Firenze	La sensitiva	Miniseries (1 episode)
