= Levana =

Roman goddess

Levana (from Latin levare, "to lift") is an ancient Roman goddess involved in rituals pertaining to childbirth. Augustine says that dea Levana is invoked when the child is lifted de terra, from the earth or ground. Her function may be paralleled by the Greek Artemis Orthia, if interpreted as the Artemis who lifts or raises children.

It is sometimes supposed that Levana was invoked in a ceremony by which the father lifted the child to acknowledge it as his own, but the existence of such a ceremony is based on tenuous evidence and contradicted by Roman law pertaining to legitimacy of birth. More likely, Levana was the goddess who oversaw the lifting of the child by the midwife immediately after birth. Kneeling or squatting was a more common position for childbirth in antiquity, and the newborn probably came to rest on the ground before the umbilical cord was cut.

== Modern use ==
Thomas De Quincey's prose poem Levana and Our Ladies of Sorrow begins with a discussion of the role of Levana in Roman religion and goes on to invent three companions for her: Mater Lachrymarum, Our Lady of Tears; Mater Suspiriorum, Our Lady of Sighs; and Mater Tenebrarum, Our Lady of Darkness.

Levana is the name of an infant and child safety product manufacturer. The brand was established in 2007 and concentrates on electrical means of protection.

In The Lunar Chronicles by Marissa Meyer, Levana is the name of the current queen of Luna (a human colony on the moon).
