= Claudio Argento =

Italian film producer and screenwriter

- Born: 15 September 1943 (age 82); Rome, Kingdom of Italy
- Occupations: Film producer; screenwriter
- Relatives: Dario Argento (brother); Asia Argento (niece)

Claudio Argento (born 15 September 1943) is an Italian film producer and screenwriter.

== Career ==
Most of the titles he has produced have been the horror films directed by his older brother, Dario Argento. One major exception was Alejandro Jodorowsky's cult film Santa Sangre (1989); in addition to producing, Claudio Argento co-wrote the screenplay for the film. Argento was an associate producer for George A. Romero's Dawn of the Dead (1978).

== Personal life ==
Argento was born in Rome, the son of Sicilian film producer and executive Salvatore Argento (1914–1987) and Brazilian photographer Elda Luxardo (1915–2013), who was of Italian ancestry.
