= Confessions of an English Opium-Eater =

1821 autobiographical work by Thomas De Quincey

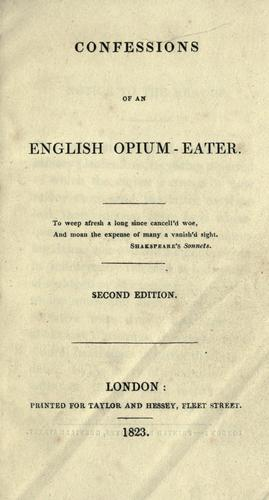
- Title page of the second edition
- Author: Thomas De Quincey
- Language: English
- Genre: Autobiography
- Published: 1821 (The London Magazine)
- Publication place: England
- Media type: Print
- Text: Confessions of an English Opium-Eater at Wikisource

Confessions of an English Opium-Eater is a memoir by Thomas De Quincey that recounts the circumstances of his addiction to laudanum, his experience of the drug, and its effect on his life. De Quincey was born in 1785. The chronology of his narrative begins with the death of his father in 1793, continues through his opium years beginning in 1804, and concludes after his marriage (in 1817) to a farmer's daughter named Margaret Simpson.

De Quincey completed the first edition of Confessions in 1821, at which point he published them anonymously in The London Magazine, where they appeared in two parts (in the September and October issues, respectively). A book edition with a new appendix followed in 1822, and a greatly expanded and revised edition in 1856.

When De Quincey first revealed himself to be the author of the confessions, the disclosure brought him immediate fame. Although De Quincey was a prolific essayist as well as translator, Confessions is the work for which he is renowned.

== Synopsis ==
As originally published, De Quincey's account was organised into two parts:

- Part I begins with a notice "To the Reader", in order to establish the narrative frame: "I here present you, courteous reader, with the record of a remarkable period in my life ...". It is followed by the substance of Part I,
  - Preliminary Confessions, devoted to the author's childhood and youth, and concentrated upon the emotional and psychological factors that underlay the later opium experiences—especially the period in his late teens that De Quincey spent as a homeless runaway in Oxford Street in London in 1802 and 1803.
- Part II is split into several sections:
  - A relatively brief introduction and connecting passage, followed by
  - The Pleasures of Opium, which discusses the early and largely positive phase of the author's experience with the drug, from 1804 until 1812;
  - Introduction to the Pains of Opium, which delivers a second installment of autobiography, taking De Quincey from youth to maturity; and
  - The Pains of Opium, which recounts the extreme of the author's opium experience (up to that time), with insomnia, nightmares, frightening visions, and difficult physical symptoms.
- Another "Notice to the Reader" attempts to clarify the chronology of the whole.

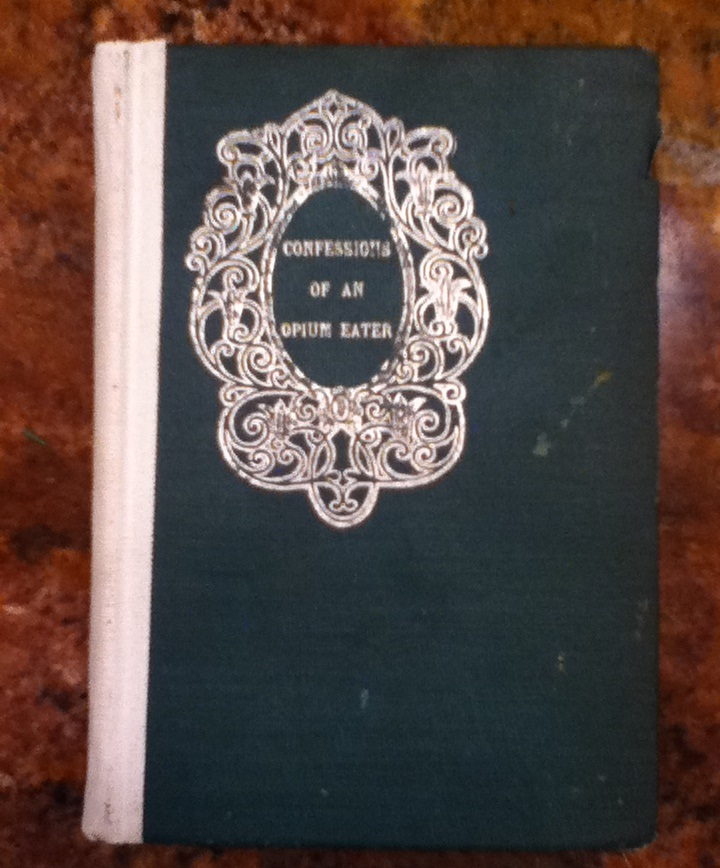
The cover of Thomas De Quincey's book Confessions of an Opium-Eater. This version was published by the Mershon Company in 1898.

Though De Quincey was later criticised for giving too much attention to the pleasure of opium and not enough to the harsh negatives of addiction, The Pains of Opium is—in fact—significantly longer than The Pleasures. However, even when trying to convey darker truths, De Quincey's language can seem seduced by the compelling nature of the opium experience:

The sense of space, and in the end, the sense of time, were both powerfully affected. Buildings, landscapes, &c. were exhibited in proportions so vast as the bodily eye is not fitted to conceive. Space swelled, and was amplified to an extent of unutterable infinity. This, however, did not disturb me so much as the vast expansion of time; I sometimes seemed to have lived for 70 or 100 years in one night; nay, sometimes had feelings representative of a millennium passed in that time, or, however, of a duration far beyond the limits of any human experience.

== Style ==
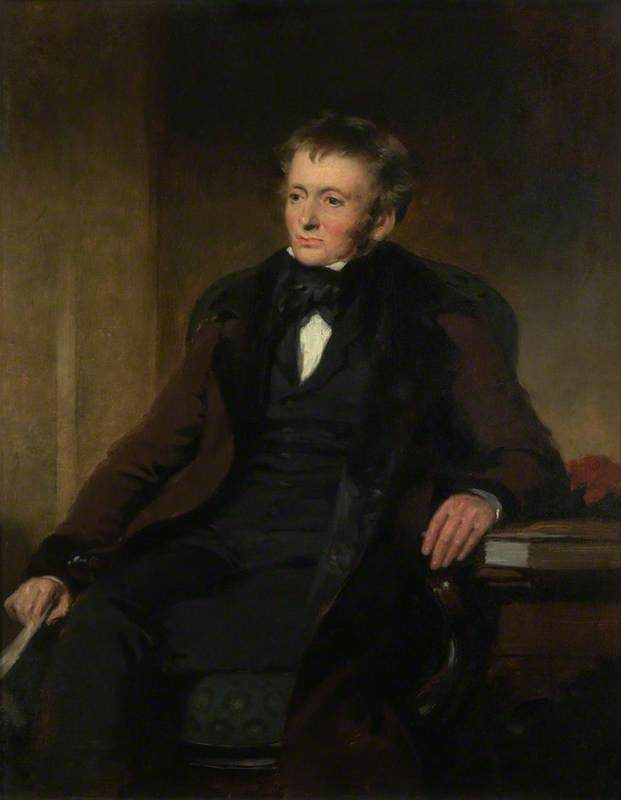
Thomas De Quincey, c. 1846

From its first appearance, the literary style of the Confessions attracted attention and comment. De Quincey was well read in the English literature of the sixteenth and seventeenth centuries and assimilated influences and models from Sir Thomas Browne and other writers. Arguably the most famous, and often-quoted, passage in the Confessions is the apostrophe to opium in the final paragraph of The Pleasures:

Oh! just, subtle, and mighty opium! that to the hearts of poor and rich alike, for the wounds that will never heal, and for 'the pangs that tempt the spirit to rebel,' bringest an assuaging balm; eloquent opium! that with thy potent rhetoric stealest away the purposes of wrath; and to the guilty man, for one night givest back the hopes of his youth, and hands washed pure of blood ...

De Quincey modelled this passage on the apostrophe "O eloquent, just and mightie Death!" in Sir Walter Raleigh's History of the World.

Earlier, in The Pleasures of Opium, De Quincey describes the long walks he took through the London streets under the influence of the drug:

Some of these rambles led me to great distances; for an opium-eater is too happy to observe the motions of time. And sometimes in my attempts to steer homewards, upon nautical principles, by fixing my eye on the pole-star, and seeking ambitiously for a north-west passage, instead of circumnavigating all the capes and headlands I had doubled in my outward voyage, I came suddenly upon such knotty problems of alleys, such enigmatical entries, and such sphinx's riddles of streets without thoroughfares, as must, I conceive, baffle the audacity of porters, and confound the intellects of hackney-coachmen.

The Confessions represents De Quincey's initial effort to write what he called "impassioned prose", an effort that he would later resume in Suspiria de Profundis (1845) and The English Mail-Coach (1849).

== 1856 revision ==
In the early 1850s, De Quincey prepared the first collected edition of his works for publisher James Hogg. For that edition, he undertook a large-scale revision of the Confessions, more than doubling the work's length. Most notably, he expanded the opening section on his personal background, until it consumed more than two-thirds of the whole. Yet he gave the book "a much weaker beginning" and detracted from the impact of the original with digressions and inconsistencies; "the verdict of most critics is that the earlier version is artistically superior".

"De Quincey undoubtedly spoiled his masterpiece by revising it ... anyone who compares the two will prefer the unflagging vigour and tension of the original version to the tired prosiness of much of the revised one".

== Influence ==
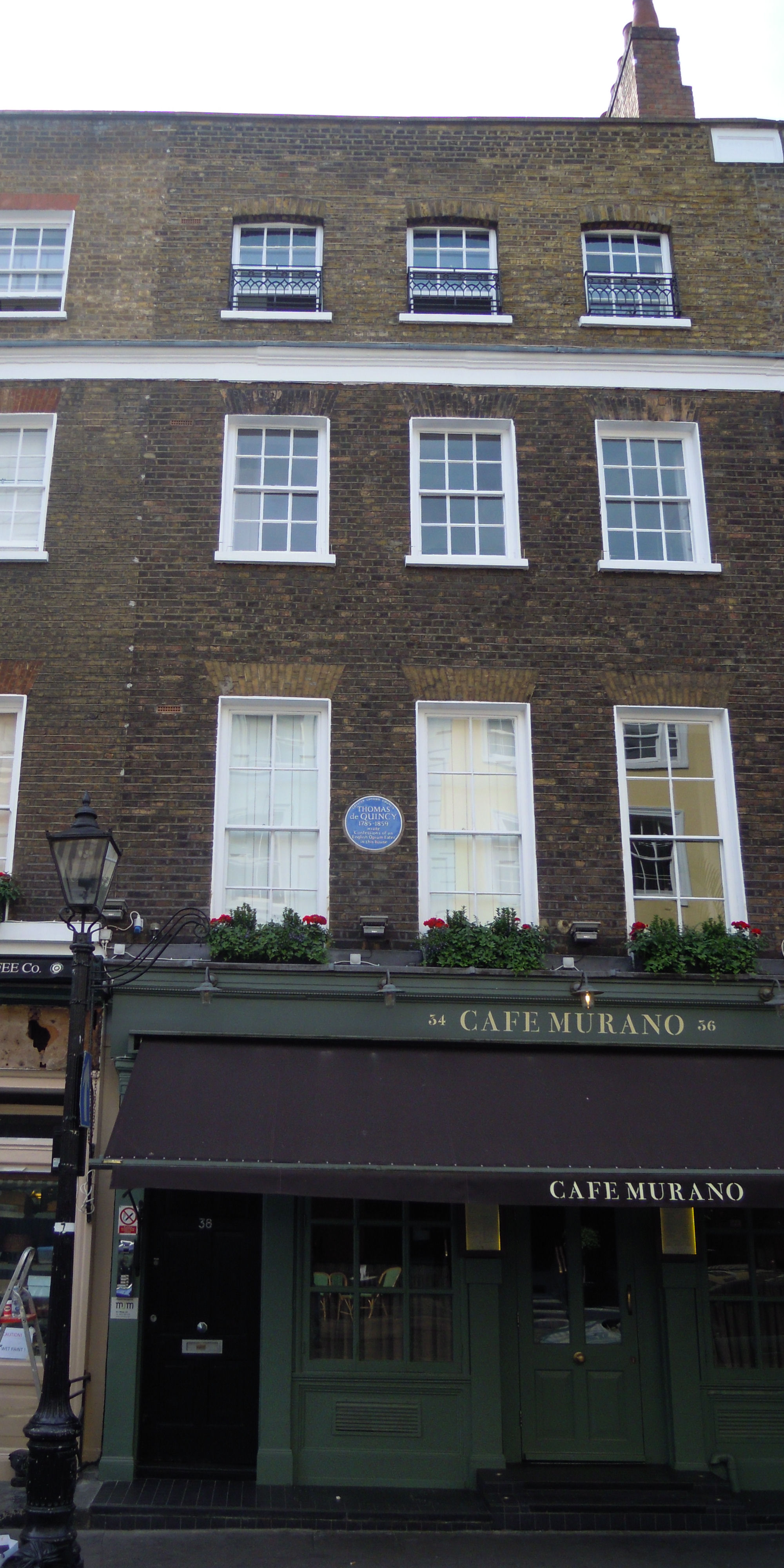
36 Tavistock Street in London's Covent Garden, where De Quincey wrote Confessions – photographed in 2019

The Confessions maintained a place of primacy in De Quincey's literary output, and his literary reputation, from its first publication; "it went through countless editions, with only occasional intervals of a few years, and was often translated. Since there was little systematic study of narcotics until long after his death, De Quincey's account assumed an authoritative status and actually dominated the scientific and public views of the effects of opium for several generations."

Yet from the time of its publication, De Quincey's Confessions was criticized for presenting a picture of the opium experience that was too positive and too enticing to readers. As early as 1823, an anonymous response, Advice to Opium Eaters, was published "to warn others from copying De Quincey." The fear of reckless imitation was not groundless: several English writers—Francis Thompson, James Thomson, William Blair, and perhaps Branwell Brontë—were led to opium use and addiction by De Quincey's literary example.

Charles Baudelaire's 1860 translation and adaptation, Les paradis artificiels, spread the work's influence further. One of the characters of the Sherlock Holmes story The Man with the Twisted Lip (1891) is an opium addict who began experimenting with the drug as a student after reading the Confessions. De Quincey attempted to address this type of criticism. When the 1821 original was printed in book form the following year, he added an appendix on the withdrawal process; and he inserted significant material on the medical aspects of opium into his 1856 revision.

More generally, De Quincey's Confessions influenced psychology and abnormal psychology, and attitudes towards dreams and imaginative literature. Edgar Allan Poe praised Confessions for its "glorious imagination—deep philosophy—acute speculation".

The play The Opium Eater by Andrew Dallmeyer was based on Confessions of an English Opium-Eater, and has been published by Capercaillie Books. In 1962, Vincent Price starred in the full-length film Confessions of an Opium Eater, which was a reimagining of De Quincey's Confessions by Hollywood producer Albert Zugsmith.

In the 1999 documentary Tripping, recounting Ken Kesey's Furthur bus and its influence, Malcolm McLaren refers to De Quincey's book as the influence for the Beat Generation before Jack Kerouac's popular On the Road was written.

De Quincey's book is parodied in the 2002 video game The Elder Scrolls III: Morrowind, which features an in-game book titled Confessions of a Dunmer Skooma-Eater about the fictional drug skooma.
