= Thomas De Quincey bibliography =

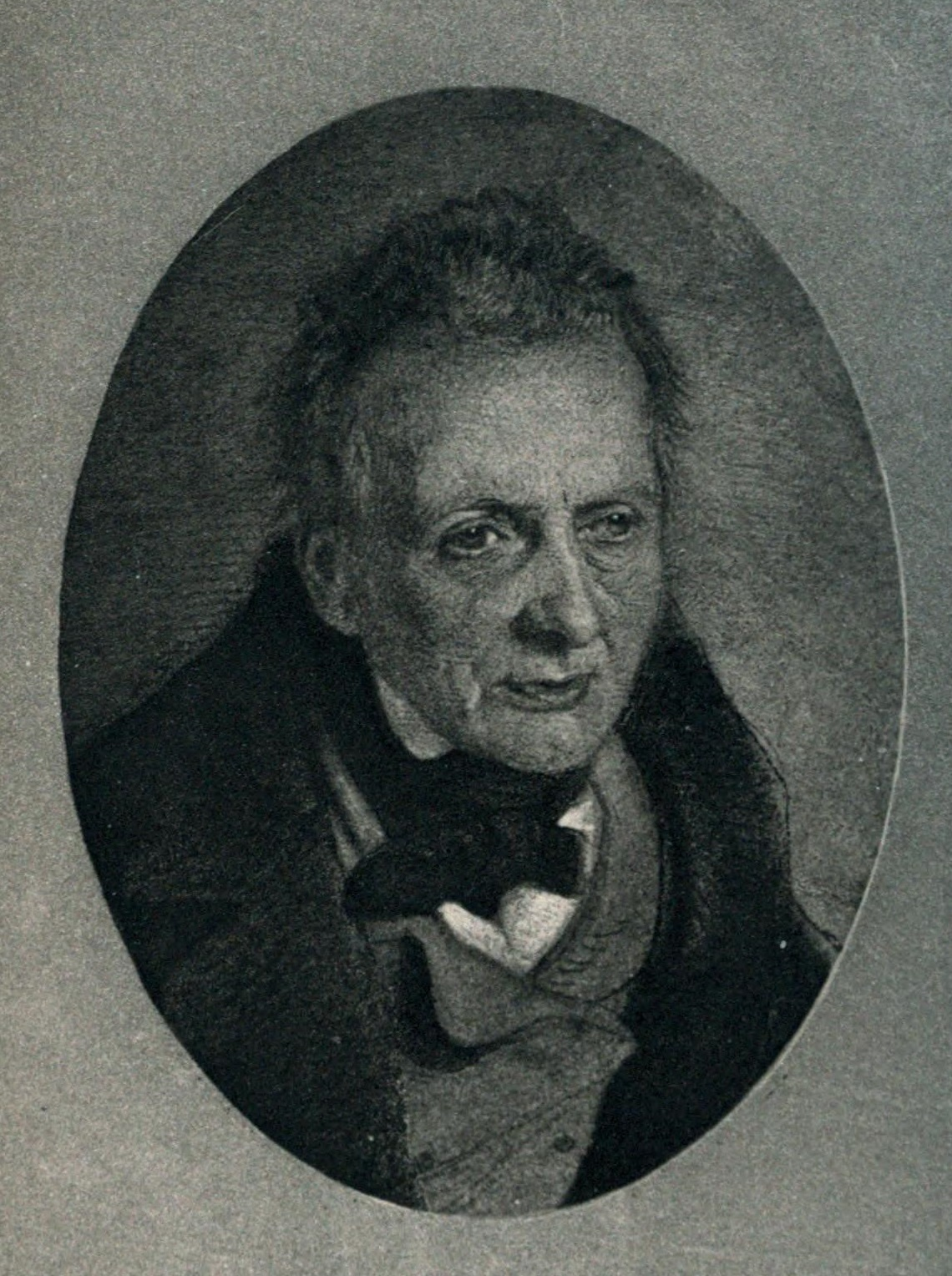
Thomas De Quincey, by James Archer.

This is a bibliography of works by Thomas De Quincey (15 August 1785 – 8 December 1859), a romantic English writer. Chiefly remembered today for his Confessions of an English Opium-Eater (1821), De Quincey's oeuvre includes literary criticism, poetry, and a large selection of reviews, translations and journalism. His private correspondence and diary have also been published.

== Essays ==
=== 1820s ===
- 1819–20

"Danish Origin of the Lake-country Dialect". Westmorland Gazette. November 13, December 4 and 18, 1819, and January 8, 1820.

London Magazine

- 1821

"Confessions of an English Opium-Eater: Being an Extract from the Life of a Scholar". (September); "Part II" (October)
"To the Editor of the London Magazine" (December)
"John Paul Frederick Richter" (December)

- 1822

"Confessions of an English Opium-Eater". "Appendix" (December)

- 1823

"Letters to a Young Man whose Education has been Neglected." (January); "No. II" (February); "No. III. On Languages" (March)
"Anecdotage" (March)
"Death of a German Great Man" (April)
"Letters to a Young Man whose Education has been Neglected". "No. IV. On Language" (May); "No. V. On the English Notices of Kant" (July)
"Notes from the Pocket-book of a Late Opium-eater. No. I" (September)
"Notes from the Pocket-book of a Late Opium-eater. No. II" (October)

"Malthus"
"On the Knocking at the Gate in Macbeth"

"Notes from the Pocket-book of a Late Opium-eater. No. III. English Dictionaries" (November)
"Measure of Value" (December)
"To the Editor of the London Magazine" (December)

- 1824

"Historico-critical Inquiry into the Origin of the Rosicrucians and Free-masons" (January); (February); (March); "Appendix" (June)
"The Services of Mr. Ricardo to the Science of Political Economy" (March)
"Kant on National Character in Relation to the Sense of the Sublime and Beautiful" (April)
"Education. Plans for the Instruction of Boys in Large Numbers" (April); (May)
"Notes from the Pocket-book of a Late Opium-eater. No. IV" (June)

"False Distinctions"
"Madness"

"Notes from the Pocket-book of a Late Opium-eater. No. V" (July)

"Superficial Knowledge"

"Notes from the Pocket-book of a Late Opium-eater. No. VI" (December)

"Falsification of the History of England"
"Falsification of English History by Hume"

"Goethe's Wilhelm Meister's Apprenticeship" (August); (September)
"Walladmor, Sir Walter Scott's German Novel"

- 1825

"The Street Companion: or the Young Man's Guide and the Old Man's Comfort in the Choice of Shoes" (January)

Blackwood's Magazine

- 1826

"Gallery of the German Prose Classics", No. I.—Lessing (November)

- 1827

"Gallery of the German Prose Classics". "No. II.—Lessing" (January); "No. III.—Kant" (February)
"On Murder Considered as one of the Fine Arts" (February)

- 1828

"Elements of Rhetoric" (December)

Edinburgh Literary Gazette

- 1829

"Sketch of Professor Wilson, Parts I–III" (June 6 & 20, July 11)

=== 1830s ===
Blackwood's Magazine

- 1830

"Kant in his Miscellaneous Essays" (August)
"Life of Richard Bentley" (September); (October)

- 1831

"Dr. Parr and his Contemporaries" (January), (February); (May); (June)

- 1832

"Cæsars", (October); II. Augustus (December)

- 1833

Blackwood's Magazine

"Cæsars. Chapter III. Caligula, Claudius, and Nero" (January)
"The Revolution of Greece" (April)

The Gallery of Portraits: With Memoirs, Volume 1

"Milton"

Tait's Edinburgh Magazine

"Mrs. Hannah More" (December)

- 1834

Tait's Edinburgh Magazine

"Animal Magnetism" (January)
"Sketches of Life and Manners: from the Autobiography of an English Opium-eater" (February); (March); (April); "The Irish Rebellion" (May); (August)
"Travelling in England Thirty Years Ago: from the Autobiography of an English Opium-eater" (December)
"Samuel Taylor Coleridge" (September); (October); (November)

Blackwood's Magazine

"The Cæsars". "IV. The Patriot Emperors" (June); (July); "Conclusion" (August)

- 1835

Tait's Edinburgh Magazine

"Samuel Taylor Coleridge" (January)
"Sketches of Life and Manners: from the Autobiography of an English Opium-eater, Oxford" (February); (June); (August)
"A Tory's Account of Toryism, Whiggism and Radicalism" (December)

- 1836

Tait's Edinburgh Magazine

"A Tory's Account of Toryism, Whiggism and Radicalism" (January)
"Autobiography of an English Opium-eater" (June)

- 1837

Tait's Edinburgh Magazine

"Autobiography of an English Opium-eater. Literary Connexions or Acquaintances" (February); (March)

Blackwood's Magazine

"Revolt of the Tartars" (July)

- 1838

Tait's Edinburgh Magazine

"Sketches of Life and Manners: from the Autobiography of an English Opium-eater" (March)
"Autobiography of an English Opium-eater. Recollections of Charles Lamb" (April); (June); (September)
"A Brief Appraisal of the Greek Literature in its Foremost Pretensions" (December)

- 1839

Blackwood's Magazine

"The English Language" (April)
"On Hume's Argument Against Miracles" (July)
"Casuistry" (October)
"On the True Relations to Civilisation and Barbarism of the Roman Western Empire" (November)
"Second Paper on Murder considered as One of the Fine Arts" (November)
"Milton" (December)
"Dinner Real and Reputed" (December)

Tait's Edinburgh Magazine

"Lake Reminiscences, from 1807 to 1830".

"No. I–III. William Wordsworth" (January); (February); (April)

"A Brief Appraisal of the Greek Literature in its Foremost Pretensions. No. II. The Greek Orators" (June)
"Lake Reminiscences, from 1807 to 1830".

"No. IV. William Wordsworth and Robert Southey" (July); "No. V. Southey, Wordsworth and Coleridge" (August); "Recollections of Grasmere" (September); "The Saracen's Head" (December)

=== 1840s ===
- 1840

Blackwood's Magazine

"On the Essenes" (January)
"Theory of Greek Tragedy" (February)
"Casuistry" (part 2) (February)
"War with China, and the Opium Question" (March)
"On the Essenes, Part II" (April)
"Modern Superstition" (April)
"On the Essenes, Part III" (May)
"The Opium and the China Question" (June)
"Postscript On The China and the Opium Question" (June)
"Style" (July); No. II (September); No. III (October)

Tait's Edinburgh Magazine

"Sketches of Life and Manners: from the Autobiography of an English Opium-eater".

Westmoreland and Dalesmen (January); (March); (June); (August); (October); (December)

- 1841

Blackwood's Magazine

"Style. No. IV" (February)
"The Dourraunee Empire" (March)
"Plato's Republic" (July)
"Homer and the Homeridæ" (October); Part II. The Iliad (November); Part III. Verdict on the Homeric Questions (December)

Tait's Edinburgh Magazine

"Sketches of Life and Manners: from the Autobiography of an English Opium-eater" (February)

- 1842

Blackwood's Magazine

"Philosophy of Herodotus" (January)
"The Pagan Oracles" (March)
"Cicero" (July)
"Modern Greece" (July)
"Ricardo Made Easy; or, What is the Radical Difference between Ricardo and Adam Smith? With an Occasional Notice of Ricardo's Oversights" (September); (October); (December)

- 1843

Blackwood's Magazine

"Ceylon" (November)

- 1844

Blackwood's Magazine

"Secession from the Church of Scotland" (February)
"Greece Under the Romans" (October)

- 1845

Blackwood's Magazine

"Coleridge and Opium-eating" (January)
"Suspiria de Profundis: Being a Sequel to the Confessions of an English Opium-eater" (March)

Introductory Notice (March)
Part I (April)
Part I. Concluded. The Palimpsest" (June)
Part II (July)

Tait's Edinburgh Magazine

"On Wordsworth's Poetry" (September)
"On the Temperance Movement of Modern Times" (October)
"Notes on Gilfillan's 'Gallery of Literary Portraits'". Godwin & Foster. (November); Hazlitt & Shelley. (December)

- 1846

Tait's Edinburgh Magazine

"Notes on Gilfillan's 'Gallery of Literary Portraits'. Shelley." (January)
"The Antigone of Sophocles as Represented on the Edinburgh Stage in December 1845" (February); (March)
"Memoirs and Correspondance of the Marquess Wellesley" (March)
"On Christianity, as an Organ of Political Movement" (April)
"Notes on Gilfillan's 'Gallery of Literary Portraits'. Keats." (April)
"On Christianity, as an Organ of Political Movement" (June)
"Glance at the Works of Mackintosh" (July)
"System of the Heavens as Revealed by Lord Rosse's Telescopes" (September)

- 1847

Tait's Edinburgh Magazine

"Notes on Walter Savage Landor". (January); (February)
"Orthographic Mutineers" (March)
"Joan of Arc: In Reference to M. Michelet's History of France" (March)
"Milton versus Southey and Landor" (April)
"The Nautico-Military Nun of Spain". (May); (June); (July)
"Secret Societies" (August)
"Joan of Arc" (August)
"Schlosser's Literary History of the Eighteenth Century" (September)
"Secret Societies. Part II." (October)
"Conversation" (October)
"Schlosser's Literary History of the Eighteenth Century" (October)
"Protestantism". (November); (December)

- 1848

The Glasgow Athenæum Album

"Sortilege on Behalf of the Glasgow Athenæum"
"Astrology"

Tait's Edinburgh Magazine

"Protestantism" (February)

The North British Review

"Forster's Life of Goldsmith" (May)
"Pope" (August)
"Charles Lamb and his Friends" (November)

- 1849

Blackwood's Magazine

"The English Mail-coach, or the Glory of Motion" (October)
"The Vision of Sudden Death/Dream-Fugue" (December)

=== 1850s ===
- 1850

Hogg's Weekly Instructor

"Conversation"
"The Sphinx's Riddle"
"Logic"
"Professor Wilson"
"French and English Manners"
"Presence of Mind: A Fragment"

- 1851

Hogg's Weekly Instructor

"On the Present Stage of the English Language"
"A Sketch from Childhood"
"A Sketch from Childhood. No. II"

Tait's Edinburgh Magazine

"Lord Carlisle on Pope" (April, May, June)

- 1852

Hogg's Weekly Instructor

"A Sketch from Childhood"

Nos. III, IV, V, VI. Literature of Infancy, VII.

"Sir William Hamilton, Bart"
"California"
"Sir William Hamilton, with a Glance at his Logical Reforms"; Second Paper

- 1853

Hogg's Weekly Instructor

"On the Supposed Scriptural Expression for Eternity"
"Judas Iscariot"
"Table-talk"
"On the Final Catastrophe of the Gold-digging Mania"
"How to Write English: Introductory Paper"

== Fiction ==
=== Novel ===
- Klosterheim Or, the Masque. William Blackwood, 1832.

=== Stories ===
- "Dialogues of Three Templars on Political Economy". London Magazine. April & May, 1824.
- "The Household Wreck". Blackwood's Magazine, 1838.
- "The Avenger". Blackwood's Magazine, 1838.

== Academic ==
- "Appendix" in Concerning the Relations of Great Britain, Spain, and Portugal. William Wordsworth. Longman, Hurst, Rees, and Orme, 1809.
- Encyclopædia Britannica, 7th edition. Edinburgh: Adam and Charles Black, 1842.

"Goethe, John Wolfgang Von" (Volume 10)
"Pope, Alexander" (Volume 18)
"Schiller, John Christopher Frederick Von" (Volume 19)
"Shakespeare" (Volume 20)

== German translations ==
Title	Date	First publisher	Author
"The Happy Life of a Parish Priest in Sweden"	1821	London Magazine	Jean Paul
"Last Will and Testament — The House of Weeping"	1821	London Magazine	Jean Paul.
"The Devil's Ladder"	1822	London Magazine	Aloise Schreiber
"Mr. Schnackenberger; or, Two Masters for One Dog"	1823	London Magazine	Friedrich Laun
"Mr. Schnackenberger; or, Two Masters for One Dog"	1823	London Magazine	Friedrich Laun
"The Fatal Marksman"	1823	Popular Tales and Romances of the Northern Nations	Johann August Apel
"The Dice"	1823	London Magazine	Friedrich Laun
"The King of Hayti"	1823	London Magazine	Friedrich Laun
"The Raven: A Greek Tale"	1823	Knight's Quarterly Magazine	Johann August Apel
"The Black Chamber"	1823	Knight's Quarterly Magazine	Johann August Apel
"Analects from John Paul Richter"	1824	London Magazine	Jean Paul
"Dream upon the Universe"	1824	London Magazine	Jean Paul
"Abstract on Swedenborgianism"	1824	London Magazine	Immanuel Kant
"Idea of a Universal History on a Cosmo-political Plan"	1824	London Magazine	Immanuel Kant
"The Incognito; or, Count Fitz-Hum"	1824	Knight's Quarterly Magazine	Friedrich Laun
"The Somnambulist"	1824	Knight's Quarterly Magazine	Friedrich Laun
"The Love-Charm"	1825	Knight's Quarterly Magazine	Ludwig Tieck
Walladmor, vol. I & II	1825	Taylor and Hessey	Willibald Alexis
"The Last Days of Kant"	1827	Blackwood's Magazine	E.A.C. Wasianski
"Toilette of the Hebrew Lady, Exhibited in Six Scenes"	1828	Blackwood's Magazine	Anton Theodor Hartmann
"Age of the Earth"	1833	Tait's Edinburgh Magazine	Immanuel Kant

== Collected works ==
=== De Quincey's Writings ===
23 volumes. Ticknor, Reed & Fields, 1850–9. Edited by James Thomas Fields.

Confessions of an English opium-eater; and Suspiria de profundis. 1850.
Biographical essays. 1850.
The Cæsars. 1851.
Miscellaneous essays. 1851.
Life and manners. 1851.
Literary reminiscences; from the Autobiography of an English Opium-eater, 2 volumes. 1851.

I. Recollections of Charles Lamb. Walladmor, etc.
II. Wordsworth and Southey, Recollections of Grasmere, etc.

Memorials, and other papers, 2 volumes. 1851.

I. The orphan heiress. Oxford. The Pagan oracles. Revolution of Greece.
II. Klosterheim. The Sphinx's riddle. The Templar's dialogues.

Autobiographic sketches. 1853.
Narrative and miscellaneous papers, 2 volumes. 1853.

I. The Household wreck. The Spanish nun. Flight of a Tartar tribe.
II. On war. The last days of Immanuel Kant, etc.

Essays on the poets, and other English writers. 1853.
Historical and critical essays, 2 volumes. 1853.

I. Philosophy of Roman meals. The Essenes. Philosophy of Herodotus. Plato's Republic. Homer and the Homeridæ.
II. Cicero. Style. Rhetoric. Secret societies.

Essays on philosophical writers, and other men of letters, 2 volumes. 1854.

I. Kant in his miscellaneous essays. Herder. John Paul Frederick Richter, Analects from Richter, etc.
II. Bentley. Parr.

Theological essays, and other papers, 2 volumes. 1854.

I. Christianity as an organ of political movement. Protestantism, etc.
II. Secession from the Church of Scotland, etc.

Letters to a young man, and other papers. 1854.
Note-book of an English Opium-eater. 1855.
The Avenger, and other papers. 1859.
Logic of political economy, and other papers. 1859.

=== Selections Grave and Gay ===
from Writings Published and Unpublished, by Thomas De Quincey, 14 volumes. James Hogg, 1853–60.

- I–II. Autobiographic sketches, 2 volumes. 1853-4.

The affliction of childhood, etc.
Laxton...Coleridge, William Wordsworth, etc.

- III-IV. Miscellanies. 1854.

The Spanish military nun. The last days of Immanuel Kant, etc.
On murder considered as one of the fine arts. Revolt of the Tartars, etc.

- V. Confessions of an English opium-eater. 1856.
- VI. Sketches Critical and Biographic. 1857.
- VII. Studies on secret records, personal and historic. 1858.
- VIII. Essays sceptical and anti-sceptical, on problems neglected or misconceived. 1858.
- IX. Leaders in literature, with a notice of traditional errors affecting them. 1858.
- X. Classic records reviewed or deciphered. 1859.
- XI. Critical suggestions on style and rhetoric. 1859.
- XII-XIII. Speculations, literary and philosophic, with German tales, and other narrative papers. 1859.

Prefatory note. Ceylon. The King of Hayti, etc.
Lord Carlisle on Pope. Glance at the works of Mackintosh, etc.

- XIV. Letters to a young man whose education has been neglected, and other papers. 1860.

=== The Collected Writings of Thomas De Quincey ===
14 volumes. A. & C. Black, 1889–90. Edited by David Masson.

- I. Autobiography, from 1785 to 1803.
- II. Autobiography and literary reminiscences.
- III. London reminiscences, and Confessions of an opium-eater.
- IV. Biographies and biographic sketches.
- V. Biographies and biographic sketches.
- VI. Historical Essays and Researches.
- VII. Historical essays and researches.
- VIII. Speculative and theological essays.
- IX. Political economy and politics.
- X. Literary theory and criticism.
- XI. Literary theory and criticism.
- XII. Tales and romances.
- XIII. Tales and prose phantasies.
- XIV. Miscellanea and Index.

=== The Works of Thomas De Quincey ===
21 volumes. Pickering and Chatto, 2000–3. Edited by Grevel Lindop. Volume editors: Frederick Burwick, David Groves, Lindop, Robert Morrison, Barry Symonds.

1. Writings, 1799–1820
2. Confessions of an English Opium-Eater, 1821–1856
3. Articles and Translations from The London Magazine, Blackwood's Magazine and Others, 1821–1824
4. Articles and Translations from The London Magazine; Walladmor; 1824–1825
5. Articles from the Edinburgh Saturday Post, 1827–1828
6. Articles from the Edinburgh Evening Post, Blackwood's Edinburgh Magazine and the Edinburgh Literary Gazette, 1826–1829
7. Articles from the Edinburgh Literary Gazette and Blackwood's Magazine, 1829–1831
8. Articles from Blackwood's Edinburgh Magazine and The Gallery of Portraits; Klosterheim: or, The Masque; 1831–2
9. Articles from Blackwood's Edinburgh Magazine and Tait's Edinburgh Magazine, 1832–8
10. Articles from Tait's Edinburgh Magazine, 1834–8
11. Articles from Tait's Magazine and Blackwood's Magazine, 1838–41
12. Articles from Blackwood's Edinburgh Magazine, 1840–1
13. Articles from Blackwood's Edinburgh Magazine and the Encyclopaedia Britannica, 1841–2
14. Articles from Blackwood's Edinburgh Magazine, 1842–3
15. Articles from Blackwood's Edinburgh Magazine and Tait's Edinburgh Magazine, 1844–6
16. Articles from Tait's Edinburgh Magazine, Macphail's Edinburgh Ecclesiastical Journal, the Glasgow Athenaeum Album, the North British Review, and Blackwood's Edinburgh Magazine, 1847–9
17. Articles from Hogg's Instructor and Tait's Edinburgh Magazine, 1850–2
18. 1853–8
19. Autobiographical Sketches
20. Prefaces &c., to the Collected Editions, Published Addenda, Marginalia, Manuscript Addenda, Undatable Manuscripts
21. Transcripts of Unlocated Manuscripts

=== Selections ===
- The Logic of Political Economy. William Blackwood and Sons, 1844.
- The Art of Conversation and Other Papers. Edinburgh: Adam and Charles Black, 1863.
- De Quincey's Editorship of The Westmorland Gazette. Kendal: Atkinson and Pollitt, 1890.
- Theory of Greek Tragedy. San Francisco, Cal.: William Doxey, 1893.
- Revolt of the Tartars. Boston: Ginn & Company, 1898.
- A Diary of Thomas De Quincey, 1803. Edited by Horace A. Eaton. Noel Douglas, 1927.
- California and the Gold Mania. San Francisco: Colt Press, 1945.
- Selected Writings of Thomas De Quincey. The Modern Library, 1949. Edited by Philip Van Doren Stern.
- New Essays by De Quincey. Princeton University Press, 1966. Edited by Stuart M. Tave.
