= Mike Nichols's unrealized projects =

During his long career, American filmmaker Mike Nichols has worked on several projects which never progressed beyond the pre-production stage under his direction. Some of these projects fell in development hell, were officially canceled, were in development limbo or would see life under a different production team.

== 1960s ==
=== The Public Eye ===
In January 1964, Nichols was announced to make his feature film debut as director with a film adaptation of Peter Shaffer's play The Public Eye, after the rights were bought by producer Ross Hunter. He was still attached to direct the film by December that year when he agreed to direct Who's Afraid of Virginia Woolf?, which would become his debut instead.

=== Barefoot in the Park ===
In December 1965, Nichols was in talks to helm the screen version of Neil Simon's stage play Barefoot in the Park for Paramount Pictures, but was reluctant to repeat the same projects in a new medium, as he had already directed it for stage. The following year, Gene Saks signed on to make his feature directorial debut with the film.

== 1970s ==
=== The Exorcist ===
In the 1970s, Warner Bros. chief John Calley wanted Nichols to direct the film adaptation of William Peter Blatty's novel The Exorcist, and Nichols told both Elaine May and David Geffen that missing the opportunity was his biggest regret.

=== The Last Tycoon ===
Nichols was the first director Sam Spiegel hired to take on directing duties for an adaptation of F. Scott Fitzgerald's unfinished novel The Last Tycoon. In Nichol's version, the character of Monroe Stahr was to have been played by Al Pacino. He worked for a year and a half on the film before dropping out due to editing duties on The Fortune. "I think [Nichols] knew that he had an unsuccessful picture," Spiegel commented. "And he was in a state of depression. He wanted me to postpone the picture for a year. I wouldn't dream of it." Instead, Spiegel hired Elia Kazan to direct The Last Tycoon, who cast Robert De Niro as Stahr.

=== A Star Is Born ===
Nichols was writers John Gregory Dunne and Joan Didion's second choice to direct their musical remake of A Star Is Born, centered in the rock world. Warren Beatty was also linked to the film, but Frank Pierson would direct it.

=== Just Tell Me What You Want ===
After Nichols departed from the production of Bogart Slept Here, by November 1975, he reportedly agreed to produce and direct Jay Presson Allen's Just Tell Me What You Want for Warner Bros. Nichols would not remain with the project however, and Sidney Lumet would sign on to helm instead.

=== Swing Shift ===
Around 1976–77, actress Julie Christie, producer David Susskind and Nichols expressed interest in Swing Shift, an original screenplay by Nancy Dowd for Paramount. At this stage, the story focused on the central characters of "Lucky Lockhart" and "Rosie", who was later rewritten as "Hazel Zanussi" following several rewrites over the years, overseen by Bo Goldman and Ron Nyswaner. In the 1980s, Jonathan Demme signed on to direct the film for Warner Bros., which starred Goldie Hawn.

=== Annie ===
Following the 1977 staging of the musical Annie on Broadway, the writers asked $5 million for film rights, and requested for Nichols to direct the adaptation. By December, Columbia Pictures acquired the property. John Huston would direct the film instead, released in 1982.

=== A Chorus Line ===
In 1978, Nichols spent several months working on the film adaptation of A Chorus Line for Universal Pictures with screenwriter Bo Goldman, who were both concerned about how to widen its plot and make it more visual without destroying what made the original stage production so affective. Goldman's finished screenplay did not satisfy Universal head Ned Tanen and their version was ultimately scrapped after Nichols could not receive a larger projected budget than $16 million, which he deemed "impractical". The project eventually landed at Columbia Pictures, and Richard Attenborough was selected to direct the film, in 1985.

=== The French Lieutenant's Woman ===
Nichols was one of several directors who tried and failed to conquer the complicated narrative of John Fowles's epic romantic novel The French Lieutenant's Woman, before the adaptation was eventually produced in 1980 by British director Karel Reisz.

=== Sophie's Choice ===
In 1979, Nichols and Miloš Forman expressed interest in dividing directorial duties of the NY and European scenes, respectively, for Sophie's Choice, which Alan J. Pakula had signed on earlier to produce and direct.

== 1980s ==
=== Betrayal ===
A week after the New York stage opening of Harold Pinter's play Betrayal, Nichols agreed to direct a film version for producer Sam Spiegel. They wanted Meryl Streep to play the heroine, but she changed her mind after her role in The French Lieutenant's Woman, which was also set in England, left her away from her family. After Streep's departure, Nichols too left the project, and David Jones was signed to replace him.

=== Innocent Blood ===
In 1981, it was reported that 20th Century-Fox was financing Nichols's film of mystery writer P. D. James's Innocent Blood, a novel about a woman's search for identity. Tom Stoppard worked on the screenplay for the film, and Frank Yablans was set to produce.

=== The Longshot ===
In 1985, Nichols was preparing to direct The Longshot, having received the offer from Harvey Korman. After rehearsing with the actors in Los Angeles and making script suggestions, Nichols left the project as he was otherwise committed to directing Heartburn with Meryl Streep and Jack Nicholson. Instead, he agreed to serve as executive producer on the film.

=== Frankie and Johnny ===
In 1988, it was reported that Paramount Pictures optioned Terrence McNally's two-character play Frankie and Johnny in the Clair de Lune for Nichols to direct as a film. At the time, Dianne Wiest and Richard Dreyfuss were likely to star under Nichols's direction, but all three would eventually depart from the production. The film, which debuted in 1991, instead starred Michelle Pfeiffer and Al Pacino, and was directed by Garry Marshall.

== 1990s ==
=== All the Pretty Horses ===
In 1992,

=== The Impersonator ===
In March 1993,

=== Titanic stage production ===
In July 1993,

=== Untitled Oscar Wilde biopic ===
In 1994, United Artists was developing a film about the life of controversial British playwright Oscar Wilde that was to be produced and presumably directed by Nichols, with Alice Arlen as executive producer. David Hare wrote the script, and Liam Neeson was allegedly in discussions to play Wilde.

=== Kind Hearts and Coronets remake ===
In an April 1999 profile for The New York Times, Nichols revealed that his next project was likely to be a remake of the 1949 black comedy Kind Hearts and Coronets which was being written by Elaine May and set to star Robin Williams. The following year, it was officially reported that Universal was moving toward a fall start for production on the Nichols-directed Kind Hearts and Coronets. Nichols had developed the script with May before they were officially given the greenlight. Will Smith, Connie Nielsen and Jada Pinkett Smith were also cast in the film. In an interview for film magazine Cinescape, Nichols detailed his take on the story: "The movie is about a large, rich family where this heiress marries a black man. She's thrown out of the family. Years later, her grown-up son, who I hope will be played by Will Smith, wants to bury his mother in the family tomb. They turn him down and he decides to avenge her. So he kills the rich family members one by one." He also specified that he would not be totally faithful to the original as his version would be more about race and less about class struggle. "My movie will also end differently," the director added. "We won't wind up in a prison."

=== Dumbstruck ===
In May 1999, it was reported in Variety that Nichols had been attached to direct Dumbstruck with John Leguizamo set to star in and produce the film for Universal Pictures. John Weidner and Stephen Susco wrote the script, which follows a mute performance artist.

=== Diva ===
In September 1999,

== 2000s ==
=== Untitled Edie Sedgwick biopic ===
Nichols and actress Natalie Portman considered doing a film about Warhol superstar Edie Sedgwick, but decided to collaborate on a film version of Patrick Marber's play Closer instead, which was released in 2004.

=== Skinny Dip ===
In July 2004, Nichols acquired the rights to direct and produce the film adaptation of Carl Hiaasen's novel Skinny Dip, but would later lose the rights and not get involved in other adaptation attempts.

=== Seven-Year Switch ===
In September 2004, Nichols was in discussions to direct Julia Roberts in the rom-com Seven-Year Switch, with Doug Wick and Lucy Fisher producing for Columbia Pictures and Red Wagon.

=== High and Low remake ===
In 2008, Nichols was set to direct a remake of the Akira Kurosawa film High and Low, with David Mamet to write the script and Scott Rudin to produce the film for Miramax. In 2010, Chris Rock was set to write a new screenplay for Nichols.

=== Deep Water ===
In 2009, Nichols was set to direct a film adaptation of Patricia Highsmith's Deep Water for 20th Century Fox, with Joe Penhall writing the screenplay. A 2022 adaptation of the same novel was eventually directed by Adrian Lyne.

== 2010s ==
=== One Last Thing Before I Go ===
In 2013, Nichols was in talks to direct the film adaptation of Jonathan Tropper's novel One Last Thing Before I Go, with Tropper writing the screenplay, J. J. Abrams producing through Bad Robot and Paramount Pictures distributing. The project was likely shelved after Nichols death in November the following year.

=== Master Class ===
In 2014, Nichols was announced to direct the TV movie adaptation of Terrence McNally's play Master Class for HBO, with Meryl Streep set to star as Maria Callas. Nichols was still working on the project at the time of his death.

== See also ==
- Mike Nichols on screen and stage
