= Greek Mothers Never Die =

2024 Greek-American comedy drama film

- Directed by: Rachel Suissa
- Written by: Rachel Suissa
- Produced by: Eleonore Dailly, Rachel Suissa and Eloise Descleve
- Starring: Rachel Suissa; Abby Miner; Simon Rérolle; Carter Sirianni; Wade Hund Williams; Asia Suissa-Fuller; Sophia Sutton
- Distributed by: Gravitas Ventures
- Release dates: September 2024 (GIFF); May 9, 2025 (North America)
- Running time: 125 minutes
- Country: United States
- Language: English

Greek Mothers Never Die is a 2024 American independent comedy drama film written and directed by Rachel Suissa. The film stars Abby Miner, Simon Rérolle, and Rachel Suissa, and follows an aspiring singer who is visited by the ghost of her overbearing Greek mother as unresolved romantic and familial conflicts resurface.

The film received a limited theatrical release in the United States before being released on streaming platforms in May 2025.

== Plot ==
Ella grows up in Greece as the only child of Jack, an American singer-songwriter, and Despina, her Greek mother. During her adolescence, she forms a close bond with Nick, a shy American boy, and the two eventually fall in love. Their relationship ends abruptly when Nick returns to the United States, separating them during a formative period of their lives.

Following Jack's death and the worsening Greek economic crisis, Ella and Despina relocate to the United States, where they operate a family-owned Greek restaurant. As an adult, Ella aspires to pursue a career as a singer, while Despina, deeply traditional and outspoken, pressures her daughter to take over the restaurant. Their relationship is marked by frequent conflict despite Despina's protective intentions.

After a heated argument, Despina suffers a fatal heart attack. Soon after, she reappears to Ella as a ghost, continuing to offer unsolicited advice and criticism. Despite her abrasive demeanor, Despina remains emotionally invested in Ella's happiness and future.

Nick reenters Ella's life, now working as a doctor. After a misunderstanding involving his Greek superior, Nick asks Ella to pretend to be his fiancée in order to avoid professional consequences. Although reluctant, Ella agrees, and their staged engagement rekindles unresolved feelings.

== Cast ==
- Abby Miner as Ella
- Simon Rérolle as Nick
- Rachel Suissa as Despina
- Carter Sirianni as Jack
- Wade Hunt Williams as the Chief
- Asia Suissa-Fuller as Young Ella
- James Pearthree as Lefteris
- Michelle Calloway as Amanda
- Mollie Laylin as Aphrodite
- Bennett Pappas as Tassos
- Sophia Sutton as Heather
- Kelby Roberson as Dr. Tod
- Bob O'Hara as Peter Vassilis
- Primrose Yates as Greek Girl
- Rose Winn as Nurse Megan
- Konnor Blankenberg as Young Nick

== Production ==
Greek Mothers Never Die was written by Rachel Suissa and originated from a one-woman stage play she wrote and performed based on her real-life experiences growing up with a Greek mother. Suissa has stated that the character of Despina was inspired by her mother's outspoken personality, blending overbearing behavior with deep affection and protectiveness. Suissa's upbringing between cultures and her family's connection to a Greek restaurant influenced the film's themes, particularly the tension between personal ambition and familial expectations. Suissa also chose to infuse the film with explicit references to the Greek Mythology that shaped her upbringing and sense of humor.

Principal photography took place in Florida, including Amelia Island, with several locations used to stand in for Greece. Suissa also appears in the film in the role of Despina. The film was produced by R.A.D. Pictures. Distribution rights for North America were acquired by Gravitas Ventures.

== Release ==
Greek Mothers Never Die had a series of limited theatrical screenings in the United States prior to its digital release. A premiere screening with cast and crew in attendance took place on April 21, 2025, at AMC Village 7 in New York City, followed by additional screenings around Mother's Day weekend.

The film was acquired by Gravitas Ventures and released on digital and streaming platforms, including Amazon and Apple TV on May 9, 2025, in the United States and Canada.

== Reception ==
=== Critical response ===
Digital Journal described the film as a contemporary take on Greek-American family dynamics, and in an interview with Suissa, it revealed that she took inspiration from Nia Vardalos, director of My Big Fat Greek Wedding.

It's been described as "a touching tribute to imperfect yet unconditional love". in TheaterByte, and Digital Journal praised Suissa's performance and direction, calling the film "entertaining, quirky, and stimulating". and noting that she balances dramatic and comedic elements with authenticity.

Film Threat also responded positively, writing that the story is "a story filled with life, love, and haunting tenderness... Suissa's direction feels both deeply personal and universally resonant."

=== Festival reception ===
The film was selected for and screened at the San Francisco Greek Film Festival, the Los Angeles Greek Film Festival, the Madrid International Film Festival, the Vesuvius International Film Festival, the Greek International Film Festival Tour of Canada, and the Greek Film Festival of Australia, and the New York Independent Cinema Festival.

==== Awards ====
At the Greece International Film Festival (2024), the film received the Best Fiction Film award, and Best Actress (Rachel Suissa).

At the LA Femme International Film Festival (2024), Rachel Suissa received the Best Feature Director (Rachel Suissa).

At the Culver City Film Festival (2024), Suissa won Best Supporting Actress – Feature Film.
