= Innocent Blood =

Innocent Blood may refer to:

- Innocent Blood (novel), a 1980 novel by P. D. James
- Innocent Blood (album), a 1989 album by Resurrection Band
- Innocent Blood (film), a 1992 film by John Landis
