= On the Knocking at the Gate in Macbeth =

1823 essay by Thomas De Quincey

- Author: Thomas De Quincey
- Language: English
- Genre: essay, literary criticism
- Published: October 1823
- Publisher: London Magazine
- Publication place: England
- Media type: Print
- Pages: 3
- Followed by: On Murder Considered as one of the Fine Arts
- Text: On the Knocking at the Gate in Macbeth at Wikisource

"On the Knocking at the Gate in Macbeth" is an essay in Shakespearean criticism by the English author Thomas De Quincey, first published in the October 1823 edition of The London Magazine. It is No. II in his ongoing series "Notes from the Pocket-Book of a Late Opium Eater" which are signed, "X.Y.Z.". The first part of this dispatch is "Malthus", a much longer essay debunking the economist's theory of overpopulation.

== Background ==
In the previous month's issue of The London Magazine, George Darley wrote "A Third Letter to the Dramatists of the Day". He also analyzes the aftermath of King Duncan's murder and has the same reaction as De Quincey, "The breath seems to stop in one's throat whilst reading these lines; the vital principle is almost suspended..." De Quincey concludes his essay with a note saying he agrees with Darley's interpretation.

== Synopsis ==
The writer admits to being perplexed since childhood by the knocking at the gate in Act II of Macbeth after King Duncan is killed. The knocking created an effect for him that "reflected back upon the murder a peculiar awfulness and a depth of solemnity". The writer could not account rationally for this response according to the then-accepted canons of literary criticism. He begins by dismissing human understanding as the "meanest faculty" of the mind because it can so powerfully overrule what other senses tell us.

The Ratcliff Highway murders provided the information the writer needed to make sense of the scene. The murderer, John Williams, is praised and faintly damned for spoiling connoisseurs of murder for anything since his massacres. At the scene of his first act of butchery, a servant arrived at the house and knocked while he was still inside. The writer realizes murder is a "coarse and vulgar horror" when appreciated from the victim's perspective. In order to fully understand it, we must sympathize with the murderer, which is precisely what Shakespeare does in Macbeth.

The writer describes someone stirring from a fainting spell as the most affecting moment in the ordeal, because onlookers are assured of the recommencement of a life that was suspended. Macbeth and his wife must step out of the realm of human affairs and transfigure themselves into murderers. Lady Macbeth says she is unsexed, for instance. After their horrible act is done, Macduff knocks on the gate.

Macduff's knock is the return of the world the Macbeths have left. It signals "the pulses of life are beginning to beat again: and the re-establishment of the goings-on of the world in which we live, first makes us profoundly sensible of the awful parenthesis that had suspended them". The essay ends with a rhapsody about Shakespeare's gifts.

== Reception ==
De Quincey called his essay "psychological criticism", which was a novel approach to Shakespeare. His work foreshadows the psychological approaches of much later criticism. Though brief, less than 2,000 words in length, it has been called "De Quincey's finest single critical piece" and "one of the most penetrating critical footnotes in our literature". Commentators who are dismissive of De Quincey's literary criticism in general make an exception for his essay on Macbeth.

Charles Lamb quipped at a dinner party, "[De Quincey] has written a thing about Macbeth better than anything I could write––no––not better than anything I could write, but I could not write anything better." De Quincey's biographer Horace Ainsworth Eaton called the essay "penetrating and philosophic", adding that De Quincey "produced conclusions as significant as anything in Coleridge or Hazlitt".

De Quincey also views his responses to the play in reference to another of his classic essays, "On Murder Considered as one of the Fine Arts".
