= Dirt! The Movie =

- Official poster
- Directed by: Bill Benenson; Gene Rosow
- Produced by: Bill Benenson; Eleonore Dailly; Gene Rosow
- Starring: William Bryant Logan; Vandana Shiva; Wangari Maathai; Andy Lipkis
- Narrated by: Jamie Lee Curtis
- Edited by: Alexandra Komisaruk; Rob Seidenglanz; Jonathan P. Shaw; Brian Singbiel
- Release date: August 7, 2009
- Running time: 86 minutes
- Country: United States
- Language: English

Dirt! The Movie is a 2009 American documentary film directed by filmmakers Gene Rosow and Bill Benenson and narrated by Jamie Lee Curtis. It was inspired by William Bryant Logan's book Dirt: The Ecstatic Skin of the Earth. The documentary starred environmentalists like Wangari Maathai, Vandana Shiva, Gary Vaynerchuk, Paul Stamets, and Bill Logan. The film explores the relationship between humans and soil, including its necessity for human life and impacts by society.

Dirt! The Movie was an official selection for the 2009 Sundance Film Festival and won several awards, including the Best Documentary award at the 2009 Visions/Voices Environmental Film Festival and the "Best Film for our Future" award at the 2009 Mendocino Film Festival.
