= Andrew Lees (actor) =

Australian actor

- Born: 10 June 1985 (age 41); Melbourne, Victoria, Australia
- Occupation: Actor
- Years active: 2008–present

Andrew Lees (born 10 June 1985) is an Australian actor. He is best known for his role as Lucien Castle in the CW series The Originals and Damon in Unfriended: Dark Web (2018).

== Early life ==
Lees was born in Melbourne, Victoria, Australia. He studied at NIDA since 2005 and graduated in 2007.

== Career ==
Shortly after graduating NIDA, Lees began appearing in television in 2008. His first role was several guest appearances on popular soap opera Home and Away, in which he played Nathan Cunningham, a university student and residential advisor. He has also made guest appearances on television series City Homicide, H_{2}O: Just Add Water, and The Pacific. In 2009, Lees joined new Nine Network series Rescue: Special Ops, his first leading role, playing Chase Gallagher. His role in the show has earned him notability as an actor.

Lees also appeared in the theatre production of A Midsummer Night's Dream in 2009.

In 2011 Lees featured in a trio of short adverts for the Australian travel company STA Travel Australia STA Travel, titled "Move", "Eat" and "Learn".

In 2014, Lees played drag queen "Peggy", a supporting character in the telemovie Carlotta broadcast in Australia on ABC TV.

Recently, he starred as Lucien Castle in the CW supernatural drama series The Originals.

== Filmography ==
=== Film ===
Year	Title	Role	Notes
2008	Flame of the West	Davo	Short film
2010	The Talk	Man	Short film
2013	Australian Pilot Season	Aussie Actor	Short film
2014	Carlotta	Peggy	TV film
2017	Brown Girls	Brian	TV film
2017	Newness	Nathaniel	
2018	Unfriended: Dark Web	Damon Horton	Feature film
2018	Mortal Engines	Herbert Melliphant	Feature film
2026	Thrash	Joe Sprinkle	Feature film

=== Television ===
Year	Title	Role	Notes
2008	Home and Away	Nathan Cunningham	Season 21 (recurring, 4 episodes)
2009	City Homicide	Jake Lockwood	Season 2, episode 21 (guest)
2009–2011	Rescue: Special Ops	Chase Gallagher	Seasons 1–3 (main, 48 episodes)
2010	H_{2}O: Just Add Water	Ryan	Season 3 (recurring, 5 episodes)
2010	The Pacific	Robert Oswalt	TV miniseries (main, 3 episodes)
2013	Dance Academy	Wes Cooper	Season 3 (recurring, 6 episodes)
2015	Your Family or Mine	Blake Weston	Season 1 (main, 9 episodes)
2015	Peter Allen: Not the Boy Next Door	Greg Conell	TV miniseries (main, 2 episodes)
2015–2016	The Originals	Lucien Castle	Season 3 (recurring, 14 episodes)
2017	Throwing Shadr	Jayten	Season 1, episode 8 (guest)
2018	Legends of Tomorrow	Ernest Hemingway	Season 4, episode 6 (guest)
2020	All the Way to the Top	Rob	Season 1, episode 5 (guest)
2021	Sidetracked	Guido	Season 1 (recurring, 2 episodes)
2022	Roswell, New Mexico	Clyde	Season 4 (recurring, 11 episodes)
