= Colin Woodell =

American actor (born 1991)

- Born: Colin Todd Gerard Woodell; December 20, 1991 (age 34); San Francisco, California, U.S.
- Occupation: Actor
- Years active: 2013–present
- Spouse: Danielle Campbell (m. 2025)

Colin Todd Gerard Woodell is an American actor. He is known for playing Winston Scott on the Peacock miniseries The Continental (2023). He also played Buckley on the HBO Max series The Flight Attendant and Matias in the 2018 film Unfriended: Dark Web. Other television roles include Rick Betancourt on The Purge on USA Network and Aidan on The CW's The Originals, and other film credits including Unsane, Searching, and The Call of the Wild.

On the stage, Woodell has appeared Off-Broadway in Second Stage Theater's 2019 production of Dying City by Christopher Shinn. In 2017, Woodell played the role of Edmund Tyrone in The Geffen Playhouse's production of Long Day's Journey Into Night in Los Angeles.

== Early life and education ==
Woodell was born on December 20, 1991, in San Francisco, California, and grew up in Burlingame, California. He attended St. Ignatius College Preparatory in San Francisco, and began his training and first professional theater performances at The American Conservatory Theater as a member of the Young Conservatory. He then moved to Los Angeles, where he studied at the School of Dramatic Arts at the University of Southern California, and obtained a Bachelor of Fine Arts in Theater.

== Personal life ==
In February 2018, he started dating former The Originals co-star Danielle Campbell, and they became engaged in August 2023 after five years of dating. They got married in Biarritz, France on September 13, 2025.

== Filmography ==
=== Film ===
| Year | Title | Role | Notes |
|---|---|---|---|
| 2016 | XOXO | Ray | |
| 2017 | The Neighbor | Alex | |
| 2018 | Unsane | Mark | |
| 2018 | Searching | 911 operator | |
| 2018 | Unfriended: Dark Web | Matias O’Brien | |
| 2020 | Fragile.com | Duco | Short film |
| 2020 | The Call of the Wild | Charles | |
| 2022 | I Love America | John | |
| 2022 | Ambulance | EMT Scott | |
| 2024 | Fly Me to the Moon | Buzz Aldrin | |

=== Television ===
| Year | Title | Role | Notes |
|---|---|---|---|
| 2013 | Criminal Minds | Tommy Burns | Episode: "Route 66" |
| 2014 | CSI: Crime Scene Investigation | Barista | Episode: "Boston Brakes" |
| 2014 | Devious Maids | Ethan Sinclair | Main cast (season 2) |
| 2014, 2018 | The Originals | Aiden | Recurring role (season 2); guest role (season 5) |
| 2015 | Masters of Sex | Ronald Sturgis | Recurring role (season 3) |
| 2016–2017 | Designated Survivor | Tyler Richmond | 2 episodes |
| 2018 | The Purge | Rick Betancourt | Main cast (season 1) |
| 2020 | The Flight Attendant | Buckley Ware / Feliks | Main cast (season 1); Nominated — Screen Actors Guild Award for Outstanding Performance by an Ensemble in a Comedy Series |
| 2023 | The Continental: From the World of John Wick | Winston Scott | Main cast, miniseries |
| 2025 | Pulse | Xander Phillips | Main cast |
| 2025 | I Love LA | Ben | 2 episodes |
| 2026 | Chad Powers | Jay | Recurring role (Season 2) |
| TBA | Myron Bolitar | Myron Bolitar | Main cast |
