= Killing It =

American sitcom

- Genre: Comedy
- Created by: Dan Goor; Luke Del Tredici
- Starring: Craig Robinson; Claudia O'Doherty; Rell Battle; Scott MacArthur; Stephanie Nogueras
- Composer: Jonathan Sanford
- Country of origin: United States
- Original language: English
- No. of seasons: 2
- No. of episodes: 18

Production
- Executive producers: Dan Goor; Luke Del Tredici; Craig Robinson; Mark Schulman; Mo Marable
- Running time: 28–32 minutes
- Production companies: Tumultuous Inc.; Dr. Goor Productions; Universal Television

Original release
- Network: Peacock
- Release: March 31, 2022 – August 17, 2023

Killing It is an American comedy television series starring Craig Robinson. The pilot episode premiered on Peacock on March 31, 2022, while the rest of the season premiered on April 14. In June 2022, the series was renewed for a second season which premiered on August 17, 2023.

== Premise ==
An underdog pursuing the American dream decides to enter the Florida Python Challenge.

== Cast ==
=== Main ===
- Craig Robinson as Craig Foster
- Claudia O'Doherty as Jillian Glopp
- Rell Battle as Isaiah Foster
- Scott MacArthur as Brock (regular season 1; recurring season 2)
- Stephanie Nogueras as Camille, Craig's ex-wife (regular season 1; recurring season 2)

=== Recurring ===
- Wyatt Walter as Corby, Brock's son
- Jet Miller as Vanessa, Craig and Camille's daughter
- Tim Heidecker as Rodney LaMonca
- Anna Mae Quinn as Prada LaMonca
- Mike Mitchell as Dean Trovia
- Faith Ford as Angelica
- Arturo Del Puerto as Marco (season 1)
- Dot-Marie Jones as Jackie Boone (season 2)
- Katie Kershaw as Natalie-Ray Boone (season 2)
- Joe Massingill as Ray-Nathan Boone (season 2)
- Melanie Field as Shayla (season 2)
- Brendan Jennings as Walt (season 2)

=== Guest stars ===
- D'Arcy Carden as Sloane Faulkner (season 1)
- Zach Grenier as Jim Gallant (season 1)
- Lily Sullivan (comedian) as Gretchen (season 1)
- Beck Bennett as Johnny (season 2)
- Kyle Mooney as Bugs (season 2)
- Timothy Simons as Agent Burton (season 2)
- Ayden Mayeri as Blythe (season 2)
- Tommy Dewey as Tate (season 2)
- Jackie Earle Haley as Troy Chubner (season 2)

== Episodes ==
Series overview
Season	Episodes		Originally released
1	10	1	March 31, 2022
1	10	9	April 14, 2022
2	8		August 17, 2023

=== Season 1 (2022) ===
No. overall	No. in season	Title	Directed by	Written by	Original release date
1	1	"Pilot"	Mo Marable	Luke Del Tredici & Dan Goor	March 31, 2022
Craig Foster, a divorced father and bank security guard, is hoping to become an entrepreneur. His brother, Isiah, repeatedly takes part in illegal activities. While Craig tries a second time to get a $20,000 loan at his own bank, Isiah robs the bank, and Craig is fired from his job. Craig rents out his apartment for extra money and begins living in his car. He gets a call from another loan officer wanting to discuss a potential loan and they agree to meet at the site of his proposed saw palmetto farm. He returns to his apartment to get dressed and finds that it is being used to film pornography. Craig's car is destroyed in a fire, and he calls an Uber to take him to his meeting. His driver, Jillian G, lives in a towed billboard behind her car. On the way to the meeting, Jillian stops during the trip and kills a Burmese python. She brings it back into the car, and explains that she has a side job of killing invasive snakes. During the drive, the snake, who was believed to be dead, begins attacking Craig. He puts its head outside of the window and rolls it up to kill it, but becomes covered in blood. He wears Jillian's graduation robe to cover the blood but does not receive the loan from the loan officer. While Jillian is in collecting a $100 bounty (which she offers to Craig) for the python, Brock, a professional python hunter and influencer (with his son Corby) sees the dead python and assumes Craig hunts them and starts trash talking him about the upcoming python hunting challenge with a $20,000 prize. The episode ends with Craig smiling as he contemplates that prize getting him the $20,000 he wants to start his business.
2	2	"Kickoff"	Mo Marable	Fran Gillespie	April 14, 2022
Craig decides to enter the python hunting competition. He sees Jillian at the start of the competition, and she offers to team up. Craig insists that he wants to compete alone to get the full prize money, and Jillian teams up with Silas, a senile older man. Craig borrows a car from his ex-wife, Camille, and goes to hunt pythons. Using a nail gun, he shoots a python through the head, but accidentally nails it to his hand. He sees Jillian, who offers to take him to get medical help. After getting the snake removed, they find that Silas has died. Following his wishes to become unidentifiable so he can be buried instead of cremated, they steal his wallet. Jillian realizes that Silas has a medicine bottle with his name on it. In front of the police, Jillian steals the medicine bottle and eats the label, but is arrested for destroying evidence. Craig gets Jillian from jail, and they decide to team up. Back at his apartment, Craig is evicted from his apartment because of the pornography production.
3	3	"Dominine"	Mo Marable	Max Silvestri	April 14, 2022
Craig, now living in a 24-hour gym, and Isaiah attend a entrepreneur conference run by Rodney LaMonca, a wealthy and snobby motivational speaker. Craig hopes to pitch his business to Rita Gaines, one of the hosts, but she keeps delaying him, and ultimately reveals that she already invests in a competing business. Isaiah makes $21,000 selling stolen and made-up conference accesses. Jillian sneaks into the conference and meets Nate, a wealthy businessman. She pretends that she is also wealthy. Jillian comforts Craig, and they leave. LaMonca's thugs capture Isaiah and want revenge for his actions.
4	4	"Carlos"	Angela Barnes	Mnelik Belilgne	April 14, 2022
While out hunting, Jillian and Craig encounter Brock and Corby, Brock's son. They kill a snake and decide to try and split credit for it. While turning in their snake, they find out that Carlos is leading the competition by a big margin. They investigate Carlos, and find that he works at a nearby mini golf course. They break in at night, and discover that Carlos is breeding pythons within a storage shed, to kill and turn in. Brock's ghillie suit catches fire from a space heater being used to incubate the snakes, and they escape as the building burns down. Meanwhile, Isaiah convinces Rodney to follow his advice, and Rodney hires him. Isaiah gives Rodney further fruitful advice which leads Isaiah to become one of Rodney's advisors. Rodney invites Isaiah into his office, where Isaiah sees that he has killed one of his other advisers.
5	5	"The Task Rabbit"	Angela Barnes	Jamie Lee	April 14, 2022
Jillian begins working with Taskrabbit and gets a job to prove residency for a wealthy socialite, Sloane Faulkner. Despite being told not to invite guests, Jillian allows Nate to come over to prove that she is wealthy. Sloane sees Nate on her security cameras and calls Jillian; she decides to try and help Jillian seduce Nate. Jillian manages to keep up the ruse until the IRS agent comes, and Nate tells them that nobody named Sloane Faulkner lives there. Enraged, Sloane locks them in the house and calls the police. The gardener, who knows that Jillian is being taken advantage of by Sloane, cuts the power and allows them to escape. Nate tells Jillian that he hopes she finds someone to be romantic with who cares less about money, and leaves. Jillian returns to her billboard trailer, where the police come and ask about her connection with the fire that killed Carlos's pythons.
6	6	"The Hard Place"	Jaffar Mahmood	Rheeqrheeq Chainey	April 14, 2022
Brock, Craig, and Jillian are investigated for their role in the mini golf shed burning down. They have an alibi, but Jim, an insurance agent, is suspicious. After her arrest for stealing medication from Silas, Jillian is at risk of being deported. She contacts several lawyers, but is unable to afford them. She asks her stepmother for financial aid, but she refuses. Craig is guilted into voting in the 2016 election by his daughter, where he meets with Vanessa, Camille, and Marco, Camille's partner. Marco reveals that he plans to accept a job in Columbus, Ohio, and move with Vanessa and Camille. Marco supports Craig's alibi, but blackmails him into agreeing to let Vanessa move. Craig refuses, and Marco recants his support for Craig's alibi. Camille lies and claims that she and Craig are having an affair to give Craig an alternate alibi, causing Marco to storm off and for Jim to leave. Camille learns that Craig is living in a gym and offers to let him sleep at their house. Craig contacts Isaiah and asks him for work; Isaiah arrives with the dead body of Noah, one of Rodney's advisors, in the back of his car, and asks for help.
7	7	"Boss Up"	Michael Trim	Kira Talise & Beau Rawlins	April 14, 2022
After the election of President Donald Trump, Rodney reveals that he is worried about riots, and hands out backpacks with integrated bullet proof vests. He asks Isaiah to test his vest, which he does by shooting Rodney. Seeing that Rodney was unharmed, Noah asks to be shot as well, but Rodney misses and shoots him in the neck. Noah dies, and Rodney orders Isaiah to dispose of his body. Isaiah recruits the help of Craig, and they plan to bury Noah's body in the Everglades. As they prepare to bury him, they get into an argument, and see that Noah's body is being eaten by a python. Relieved, they turn around, but see a quadcopter drone recording their actions.
8	8	"The Kingmaker"	Michael Trim	Carmen Christopher	April 14, 2022
In a flashback to 2014, Brock is fired from his job, and decides to become a professional influencer. Back in present time (2016), he follows local Christian influencers, the Flo Boys, and notices that they have the help of Kevin Brailing, who is known for promoting YouTube channels. Brock drives to their house, only to become injured when he drives over an unexploded land mine. He meets with the Flo Boys and Kevin, who agree to support him by doing a collaboration video. He borrows their car, and tries to impress Corby by his association with the Flo Boys. They return to their house, only to find that Kevin had manipulated him to avoid legal liability for his injuries, and they had no intention of promoting him. Brock leaves, and finds that Corby had stolen a golden cross from the Flo Boys. They sell it and use it to buy camera equipment, including a drone. They fly the drone in the Everglades, and it overflies Craig and Isaiah attempting to hide Noah's body.
9	9	"Desperate Measures"	Michael Weaver	Paul Welsh & Madeline Walter	April 14, 2022
Craig attempts to work with Brock. Brock agrees to work with Craig, but while he is out in the field, they encounter the body of Noah. Jillian shows up with numerous python eggs, but Craig attempts to steal them. Brock arrives and attempts to grab the eggs, but is shot.
10	10	"The Storm"	Michael Weaver	Paul Welsh & Madeline Walter	April 14, 2022
After Brock's funeral, Craig attempts to reconcile with his brother. Realizing that his daughter will be moved, Craig attempts to turn in the python that is digesting Noah.

=== Season 2 (2023) ===
No. overall	No. in season	Title	Directed by	Written by	Original release date
11	1	"What You Saw"	Mo Marable	Fran Gillespie	August 17, 2023
Unexpected visitors threaten to destroy Craig and Jillian's saw palmetto farm.
12	2	"Mallory"	Mo Marable	Max Silvestri	August 17, 2023
The Boones make their demands; Jillian must sacrifice a prized possession to save the farm.
13	3	"It Follows"	Michael Weaver	Mnelik Belilgne	August 17, 2023
A mistake awakens an evil force that threatens to destroy the new life Isaiah built for himself.
14	4	"Help Me Pay My Bills"	Michael Weaver	Rheeqrheeq Chainey	August 17, 2023
Craig struggles to prove himself to Camille and the rich couple paying her to carry their baby.
15	5	"Lying Flat"	Shahrzad Davani	Rachel Pegram	August 17, 2023
Rodney Lamonca sends Craig, Jillian and Isaiah on a first-class business trip to San Diego.
16	6	"Predatory"	Shahrzad Davani	Evan Susser	August 17, 2023
Craig must team up with an unexpected ally to rescue Jillian from the Boones.
17	7	"On the Inside"	Dan Goor	Carmen Christopher & Beau Rawlins	August 17, 2023
Craig looks for the dongle; Jillian plans to escape; all of Isaiah's lies are brought to light.
18	8	"Timber"	Luke Del Tredici	Luke Del Tredici	August 17, 2023
Craig tries to save Jillian and the farm but still must make one final, agonizing decision.

== Reception ==
On the review aggregator website Rotten Tomatoes, 90% of ten critics' reviews are positive, with an average rating of 6/10. The website's critics consensus reads, "Headlined by a fun rapport between Craig Robinson and Claudia O'Doherty, Killing It is a clever satire of a dog eat dog world." Metacritic, which uses a weighted average, assigned the first season a score of 70 out of 100, based on four critics, indicating "generally favorable reviews".
