= I Love America (2022 film) =

Film by Lisa Azuelos

- Official release oster
- Directed by: Lisa Azuelos
- Written by: Lisa Azuelos
- Produced by: Eleonore Dailly; Edouard de Lachomette
- Starring: Sophie Marceau; Djanis Bouzyani; Colin Woodell
- Cinematography: Léo Hinstin
- Edited by: Baptiste Druot
- Music by: Rudy Mancuso
- Production company: Autopilot Entertainment
- Distributed by: Amazon Studios
- Release date: 11 March 2022
- Running time: 102 minutes
- Country: France
- Languages: French; English

I Love America is a 2022 French comedy film written and directed by Lisa Azuelos, starring Sophie Marceau, Djanis Bouzyani and Colin Woodell. The film was released in France on 11 March 2022 on Prime Video.

== Plot ==
Lisa, a 50-year-old filmmaker, leaves France to start a new life in Los Angeles. She stays with her gay friend Luka, who had moved to L.A. from France five years earlier and runs his own business, a drag queen bar. Immediately after her arrival, Lisa makes a brief return to Paris for the death of her mother. Back in L.A., she begins work on her new screenplay. After a meeting with a fortune teller, who tells her she is destined to lead a solitary life, Lisa embarks on a quest for sex without commitment and is guided by Luka, who sets up a dating-app account for her. After the first encounter ends badly, Lisa next meets John. Both appear to be into the relationship until John discovers from Lisa's passport that she is 50 years old when her profile on the app said she was younger (thanks to Luka's strategy for her when he set up her account). Eventually they reconnect when John invites her to meet him on her birthday, which he had discovered when he looked at her passport.

Parallel to and intertwined with Lisa's story is the story of Luka. He has unsuccessfully been seeking a more enduring relationship than his life of brief encounters, and by the end of the film he too connects with someone in a relationship that appears to hold promise.

Throughout the film, starting with the opening scene, are flashbacks to Lisa's childhood experiences of her parents (at ages four, eight, and twelve), offered as her reflections on her current issues and attitudes about love and relationships.

== Cast ==
- Sophie Marceau as Lisa
- Djanis Bouzyani as Luka
- Colin Woodell as John
- Sophie Verbeeck as Lisa's mother
- Jorge Ortiz as Lisa's father
- Carlease Burke as Aurora, the fortune teller

== Reviews ==
Many film critics offered reviews, some positive, some negative, and many somewhere in between:

- Nicolas Rapold at The New York Times: "Marceau beams with unshakable good vibes, like a lion in the sun, though that makes her woes feel not so woeful."
- Peter Bradshaw at the Guardian: "There’s no redeeming this unfunny LA-set comedy starring Sophie Marceau, about a divorced woman’s return to dating."
- Kevin Maher at The Times: "the story of a middle-aged film-maker called Lisa who flees Paris for Los Angeles and a complicated romantic life (dating apps are involved) is compelling mainly for demonstrating that an actual human life could be hewn from so many hoary movie clichés."
- Tomris Laffly with RogerEbert.com: "I Love America is hardly a life-changing rom-com. But it’s a good candidate for your next airplane watch."
- Simon Abrams at TheWrap: "the formulaic plot and its many tacky platitudes could still be satisfying if you really want to root for good-looking people as they struggle to sell you some truly embarrassing material."
- Alex Saveliev at Film Threat: "Opting for pleasant over challenging, and breezy over insightful, Azuelos seems unsure what exactly she’s trying to say, so she speaks as genially as she can, coasting on charm."
- Jennifer Green at Common Sense Media: "Despite excellent actors and story material with plenty of potential, this French dramatic comedy doesn't succeed as a drama or as a comedy. The humor in I Love America is especially disappointing, considering how rich the possibilities were with a 50-year-old Parisian in Los Angeles on dates with strangers met through a dating app."
- Roger Moore at Movie Nation: "I Love America makes a decent 50-something showcase for the almost-ageless Sophie Marceau and pretty much nothing else. It’s a dry, somewhat vapid 'French sophisticate in LA' dramedy about parenting, love, age and finding closure as the heroine of your own story."
- Mark Dujsik at Mark Reviews Movies: "much of this story feels cobbled together from one amusing premise and a collection of musings about grief, old scars, and family. In other words, I Love America feels as if it's a mash-up of two, very different stories. While each one has its charms or its self-reflective sense of dealing with grief, the combination does not make for a cohesive or generally convincing movie, no matter how convincing some of the specifics might be."
- M.N. Miller at Ready Steady Cut: "I Love America would have worked better as a romantic drama, focusing on layering flashbacks as each act closes to giving our lead a meatier plot to work with. Instead, while the film’s charms are apparent, other than Marceau, this romantic comedy is a stuck-up misfire.
- Frank J. Avella at Edge Media Network review: "Writer-director Lisa Azuelos and co-writer Gael Fierro have fashioned a sweet, lovely cinematic valentine to the medium itself. But it's the gifted Marceau's who gives this film its heart and soul."
- Nicholas Bell at Ion Cinema: "Lisa Azuelos succeeds with her most stirring presentation yet of a mature woman searching for love, meaning, and contentment."
- Rich Cline at Shadows on the Wall: "Relaxed performances match the film's breezy tone, remaining grounded and sympathetic. Marceau has terrific off-handed charm as a woman rediscovering her passions and putting her past into context."
