= Stephanie Nogueras =

American actress (born 1989)

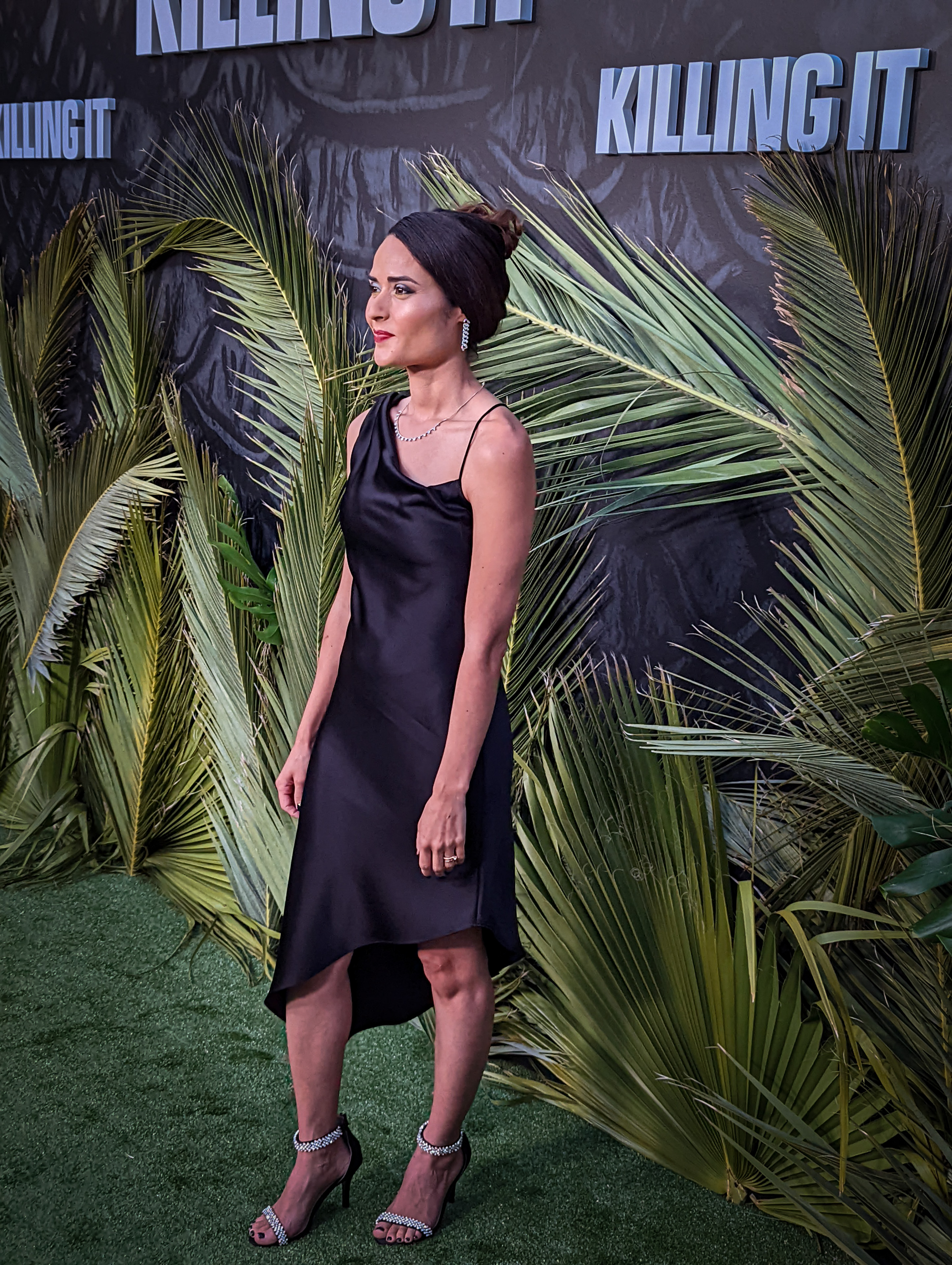
- Nogueras at the Killing It premiere.
- Born: November 18, 1989 (age 36); Camden, New Jersey
- Occupation: Actress
- Years active: 2013–present
- Children: 2
- Website: www.stephanienogueras.com

Stephanie Nogueras (born November 18, 1989) is an American actress. She is known for her roles in the television series Switched at Birth, Grimm, and Killing It, as well as the 2018 film Unfriended: Dark Web.

== Life and career ==
Nogueras was born "profoundly deaf". She is Puerto Rican, born in New Jersey, and was raised in a hearing family. Holding a Bachelor of Liberal Arts and Sciences degree from Rochester Institute of Technology, she has mentored people in deaf culture and American Sign Language.

From 2013 through 2017, she portrayed Natalie Pierce on ABC Family's Switched at Birth. In 2018, she starred as Amaya, the lead protagonist's girlfriend, in the horror film Unfriended: Dark Web.

Nogueras portrayed Camille—the ex-wife of the main character and mother to their daughter—on seasons 1 and 2 of the TV series Killing It.

In 2023, she played the lead role in episode 2 of the Fox crime anthology Accused. Max Gao of Yahoo Entertainment called her performance "stunning".

In 2025, Nogueras performed the ASL versions of both "The Star-Spangled Banner" and "America the Beautiful" at Super Bowl LIX.

== Personal ==
Nogueras married her husband in June 2022. In July, Nogueras announced that she was pregnant with a girl, due in December. Her daughter Luna was born that November. Her son Enzo was born in May 2025.

== Filmography ==
Year	Title	Role	Notes
2013	Grimm	Elly Mahario	Episode: "One Night Stand"
2013–2017	Switched at Birth	Natalie Pierce	Recurring character; 23 episodes
2018	Love Daily	Deaf Student	Episode: "Hit"
2018	The Magicians	Young Harriet	Episode: "Six Short Stories About Magic"
2018	Unfriended: Dark Web	Amaya DeSoto	Film
2018	Criminal Minds	Alma Hernandez	Episode: "Mixed Signals"
2019	Things That Fall	Carly	Short
2021	American Diablo	Anita	Short
2021	The Good Fight	Isabel Rivi	3 episodes
2022–2023	Killing It	Camille	13 episodes in seasons 1 and 2
2023	Accused	Ava	Ava's Story, episode lead
