= Swelter =

- Theatrical release poster
- Directed by: Keith Parmer
- Written by: Keith Parmer
- Produced by: Eleonore Dailly; Chris Ranta
- Starring: Jean-Claude Van Damme; Alfred Molina; Lennie James; Catalina Sandino; Josh Henderson; Brad Carter
- Cinematography: Michael Mayers
- Music by: Tree Adams
- Production company: Grand Peaks Entertainment
- Distributed by: WellGo USA Entertainment
- Release date: April 27, 2014
- Running time: 96 minutes
- Country: United States
- Language: English
- Budget: $8 million

Swelter is a 2014 American action film written and directed by Keith Parmer and starring Jean-Claude Van Damme, Lennie James, Catalina Sandino, Alfred Molina, Grant Bowler and Josh Henderson. James plays a sheriff in a small town who has a dark past that he can not remember, only to have to confront it when his ex-partners show up looking for stolen money they believe he has.

== Plot ==
Five masked robbers steal $10 million from a Las Vegas casino. All but one, who is shot in the head and assumed dead, are captured, but the money goes missing. Ten years later, Cole, the leader, is broken out of jail by the rest of his gang: Stillman, Boyd, and Cole's half-brother Kane. From a boastful mechanic, they learn that their former partner apparently survived and escaped with the money due to the intervention of a local physician. They track the physician to Baker, a small, isolated town with many secrets. They find Doc, the physician, at a local bar and, from him and other patrons, learn that the sheriff mysteriously appeared ten years ago. Curious, they start a bar fight in order to draw out the sheriff, who they realize is Pike, the partner who escaped. Pike now calls himself Bishop and claims to suffer from amnesia and migraines from the bullet fragments lodged in his head. Cole saves Bishop's life during the bar fight, and Bishop runs a belligerent biker gang out of town.

Later, Boyd and Kane suggest that they raze the town in search of the loot. Stillman objects, and Kane suggests that Stillman has gone soft. Cole is able to smooth things over and decides to instead probe Bishop to see how much he remembers. The two men discuss the town, and Cole drops a few hints about Bishop's past. Cole asks Bishop to call a coin toss, but Bishop declines and says that it is meaningless, as a man will do what he wants regardless of the result. Cole, who was holding a gun on Bishop under the table, holsters his weapon and does not interfere when Bishop leaves. Meanwhile, Bishop experiences trouble with his step-daughter, London, whose mother, Carmen, has a past with Cole. Unknown to Bishop, Cole and Carmen were once lovers, and she moved to Baker to escape her previous life. Cole attempts to rekindle their romance, but she refuses.

Boyd fatally injures Doc while researching Bishop, and Bishop learns more about his past from Doc's notes. As he dies, Doc explains that he was the one who treated Bishop. Spurred on by the information in Doc's notes, Bishop begins to remember bits of his past, though he still does not know where the money is. Boyd and Kane become restless and start trouble in the town. After a fight with her boyfriend, London makes out with Kane. When she refuses to have sex, Kane rapes her. At the local diner, Boyd attempts to force himself on the waitress which attracts the attention of the deputy. Boyd engages in a draw with the town's deputy, an award-winning sharpshooter, and wins, only to be shot down by Bishop, who is faster. Stillman, outraged that Kane would rape a teenage girl, confronts Kane and is killed by him. Bishop and Cole meet at the town's church, and Cole reveals that he has recruited the biker gang to replace his fallen men. Cole reveals Bishop's criminal background to the populace and gives them until sunrise to find the missing money.

At the local diner, Cole takes London hostage in order to ensure Bishop's cooperation. Disarmed and without the support of the townspeople, Bishop is close to giving up when Carmen reveals that she knew about Bishop's past the whole time and still accepted him. She recovers a hidden pistol and gives it to Bishop, who then goes to the diner to confront Cole. Kane uses London as a human shield, to the disgust of all the others. The biker gang leaves in protest, and Cole shoots Kane dead himself, to the surprise of Bishop. As Cole leaves the diner, Bishop stops him and says that they still must settle their issues. The two have a duel, and Bishop kills Cole. Concerned that his criminal background has now become commonly known, Bishop prepares to go on the run. However, the townspeople rally behind him and offer to cover up the recent events. Bishop stays on the town's sheriff, and an aerial shot reveals the spot where the money is hidden.

== Cast ==
- Jean-Claude Van Damme as Stillman
- Lennie James as Bishop
- Alfred Molina as Doc
- Catalina Sandino as Carmen
- Grant Bowler as Cole
- Josh Henderson as Boyd
- Brad Carter as Mechanic
- Daniele Favilli as Kane, Cole's half-brother
- Freya Tingley as London, Carmen's daughter
- Rene Napoli photo double for Jean-Claude Van Damme

Abby Miller, Guy Wilson, Courtney Hope, Peter Vack, Arie Verveen, Richard Whiten, Dawn Lewis, and Tracey Walter appear as townspeople.

== Production ==
Exchange Peaks Film Capital financed the production. Filming began in April 2013. Though set in Baker, Nevada, the film was entirely shot in Piru, California per the DVD credits.

== Release ==
Well Go USA purchased the North American rights at the American Film Market and released Swelter on DVD in the United States on August 12, 2014.

== Reception ==
David Johnson of DVD Verdict called it "a forgettable piece of gangster fare". yet Van Damme "shines in a more vulnerable and subtle role" and "even the bad guys here are complex, each of them with different codes and agendas"

Swelter was nominated Outstanding Overall Blu-ray/DVD by the International Press Academy for its 19th Satellite Awards alongside Twelve Years a Slave and Guardians of the Galaxy.
