= Unfriended: Dark Web =

2018 film by Stephen Susco

- Theatrical release poster
- Directed by: Stephen Susco
- Written by: Stephen Susco
- Produced by: Timur Bekmambetov; Jason Blum
- Starring: Colin Woodell; Rebecca Rittenhouse; Betty Gabriel; Andrew Lees; Connor Del Rio; Stephanie Nogueras; Savira Windyani
- Cinematography: Kevin Stewart
- Edited by: Andrew Wesman
- Production companies: Bazelevs Company; Blumhouse Productions
- Distributed by: OTL Releasing; BH Tilt
- Release dates: March 9, 2018 (SXSW); July 20, 2018 (United States)
- Running time: 93 minutes
- Country: United States
- Language: English
- Budget: $1 million
- Box office: $16.4 million

Unfriended: Dark Web is a 2018 American screenlife horror film written and directed by Stephen Susco in his directorial debut. Shot as a computer screen film, it stars Colin Woodell, Rebecca Rittenhouse, Betty Gabriel, Connor Del Rio, Andrew Lees, Stephanie Nogueras, and Savira Windyani. It is a separate story from the 2014 film Unfriended, as none of the previous film's events or characters are mentioned. The plot follows a group of friends who find a laptop that has access to the dark web, only to realize they are being watched by the original owners, a group of cybercriminal hackers.

The film had its world premiere at the South by Southwest festival on March 10, 2018, and was theatrically released in the United States on July 20, 2018, by Universal Pictures' OTL Releasing and Blumhouse Productions' BH Tilt. The film received mixed reviews from critics and grossed $16.4 million worldwide, against a production budget of $1 million.

== Plot ==
Matias takes home a MacBook Pro left at a cyber café. While Skyping with his friends Damon, A.J., Lexx, Serena, and Nari, he receives messages from "Erica," who is its owner, Norah, demanding the MacBook back. Matias decides to return it before receiving messages from "Charon68". A.J. realizes the MacBook is connected to the dark web. When Charon68 mentions trepanation, Matias stops responding.

Matias finds snuff films on the MacBook and traces an address in one to the home of missing 17-year-old Erica Dunne. Matias receives a video call from his deaf girlfriend Amaya, but it is Norah, demanding the MacBook and threatening to kill Amaya if the police are contacted. When Nari seeks help, Matias claims it is an alternate reality game he is developing, though Nari remains suspicious. Matias convinces Amaya to visit him; Norah follows her. Matias removes cryptocurrency from Norah's account, promising to return the money and laptop in exchange for Amaya and Erica's safety.

Matias directs Amaya and Norah to the subway - once their signal is lost, he tells his friends the truth. More Charon accounts join the chat, posting a video of Lexx being thrown off a roof and a deepfake of A.J. planning to attack a shopping mall, part of a swatting attack on A.J. As police storm A.J.'s house, the Charons play a gun-loading sound effect from his computer, and the police fatally shoot him. They ask Serena to save either her terminally ill mother or Nari; when she refuses to choose, all three are killed, including one Charon. Matias meets Amaya, leaving the laptop open so Damon can copy its files. Damon tells the Charons that everything has been recorded. The Charons create a deepfake of Matias kidnapping Erica and bring an unconscious Erica to Matias' apartment. Damon realizes the Charons intended for Matias to find the laptop so they could frame the group for their crimes. A Charon hangs Damon by his closet door while another writes a false confession and suicide note on Damon’s laptop remotely. Amaya calls Matias, who realizes the Charons hacked his messages to lead her astray. He helplessly watches as she is lured into a warehouse and abducted.

The Charons cast a vote to determine Matias' fate. Before the vote ends, Matias watches the MacBook camera to see Erica wake up and approach the computer, begging for help before discovering a hole in her skull. Afterwards, Matias sees that the voters decided to end his life, right before he gets struck by a van and dies. The camera pans back to a large desktop setup displaying feeds of various Charons in front of their cameras celebrating, revealing the entire ordeal was broadcast live on the dark web.

=== Alternate endings ===
There are three other known alternate endings.

In the first, Matias goes to meet Amaya at the park, where a Charon knocks him out with a shovel and buries him alive. When he video calls Amaya, the Charons hack his phone and distort his mouth so she can't read his lips. When he texts her, they change all his messages to “I wish I could sign better”. Amaya is left confused, and unaware of Matias suffocating directly beneath her underground.

In the second, Matias is lured into the warehouse and finds Amaya's bag, realizing the Circle has kidnapped her. They leave him with a gun and watch as he cries, betting on whether he will kill himself. The movie ends without showing what happens.

In the third, Matias meets Amaya, but Charons grab them both. The group votes on whether to let them live. One of the Charons replays a video titled “They_Earned_It.m4v“ of Matias’s move when he extorted Charon IV with his own bitcoin and saying they’ll get the money back only if they return Erica Dunne home safely. The River voters vote to spare them out of respect and film as they embrace. Meanwhile, Erica crawls out of Matias' closet, approaching the laptop and crying for help. She discovers a hole in her skull and screams in horror, the sound of her scream being sustained as a Charon ends the game.

== Cast ==
- Colin Woodell as Matias O'Brien
- Rebecca Rittenhouse as Serena Lange
- Betty Gabriel as Nari Jemisin
- Andrew Lees as Damon Horton
- Connor Del Rio as Alistair "AJ" Jeffcock
- Stephanie Nogueras as Amaya DeSoto
- Savira Windyani as Lexx Putri
- Alexa Mansour as Erica Dunne
- Chelsea Alden as Kelly
- Bryan Adrian as Charon III
- Douglas Tait as Charon IV
- Rob Welsh as Charon V
- Kiara Beltran as Charon VI

== Production ==
In April 2015, the month of Unfriended's release, it was announced that Universal Pictures had greenlit a sequel, tentatively titled Unfriended 2, with Nelson Greaves writing and Jason Blum and Timur Bekmambetov producing, and a release date then set for the spring of 2016.

On October 3, 2017, it was reported that The Grudge and Texas Chainsaw 3D writer Stephen Susco had taken over the project as writer and director. Susco shot the film in secret over one week in late 2016, under the working title Unfriended: Game Night.

In March 2018, Blumhouse officially revealed the film as Unfriended: Dark Web at SXSW 2018, under the distribution of Universal's OTL Releasing and Blumhouse's BH Tilt.

== Release ==
Unfriended: Dark Web was released in the United States on July 20, 2018. It had a surprise premiere at South by Southwest in March 2018, and then in April 2018 was screened at the Overlook Film Festival with an entirely different ending. It was then revealed in July 2018 that the film would be sent to theaters with the two different endings, which would be played at random, similar to 1985's Clue, which had multiple endings.

However, the director has stated that there is only one ending, and that the rumor came from re-editing the film after various test screenings. Still, multiple movie theatre projectionists have confirmed that they were given two copies of the film, each with a different ending, and were told to wait until further instruction on which version to play at their specific location.

== Reception ==
=== Box office ===
In the United States and Canada, Unfriended: Dark Web was released alongside 2 other sequels, Mamma Mia! Here We Go Again and The Equalizer 2, and was initially projected to gross $6–8 million from 1,543 theaters in its opening weekend. However, after making $1.42222 million on its first day, including $350,000 from Thursday night previews, estimates were lowered to $3 million. The film went on to debut to $3.5 million, finishing ninth at the box office. By the end of its theatrical run, the film grossed $15.1 million worldwide, including $8.8 million domestically, less than the $15 million the first film made in its opening weekend alone.

=== Critical response ===
On review aggregation website Rotten Tomatoes, the film holds an approval rating of 60% based on 121 reviews and an average rating of 5.8/10. The website's critical consensus reads, "Unfriended: Dark Web is more interested in chills than an exploration of its timely themes, but horror fans should still find this sequel to be steadily, undeniably effective." On Metacritic, the film has a weighted average score of 53 out of 100, based on reviews from 26 critics, indicating "mixed or average reviews". Audiences polled by CinemaScore gave the film an average grade of "C" on an A+ to F scale, the same score as the first film, while PostTrak reported filmgoers gave it a "low" 59% overall positive score.

In a positive review in Vanity Fair, K. Austin Collins wrote that the film "couldn’t seem more topical or relevant," and that it "leaves discerning viewers as entertained and skeptical as they are shaken." Geoffrey Macnab of The Independent wrote that Unfriended: Dark Web "may be an exploitation movie but it’s an ingeniously made one with a highly original storytelling style which reflects perfectly the screen-dominated lives and leisure habits of its young protagonists."

In a negative review for RogerEbert.com, Nick Allen wrote "Curiosity killed the dumb horror character, as we know from cinematic death-traps structured just like this one, but Unfriended: Dark Web stretches this conceit until it snaps, which happens about 15 minutes in." He added, "good poutine gravy, are these characters dumb, and the movie even more so."

== Possible sequel ==
Susco has teased his interest in a third Unfriended film, while also expanding upon Bekmambetov's Screenlife genre that Dark Web is a part of. He stated that it is possible that a third film might be made and that it is important that people have a great time watching it and that it leaves them with questions. But while Susco is noncommittal regarding a third Unfriended, he did go into detail about the Screenlife genre, consisting of films that unfold entirely on computer screens, and has been masterminded by Unfriended producer Bekmambetov.
