= Eleonore Dailly =

American filmmaker

- Born: Paris, France
- Education: USC School of Cinematic Arts; Columbia Law School
- Occupation: Filmmaker

Eleonore Dailly is an American filmmaker. She was born in Paris and raised in New York City. Her producing credits include I Am Not An Easy Man (a Netflix hit comedy), Voltaire High (TV series) and the feature films Les Liaisons Dangereuses, I Love America, and Dirt! The Movie. The last, a feature-length film, premiered in competition at Sundance Film Festival.

== Career ==
=== Producing ===
Dailly received an MFA from the USC School of Cinematic Arts Peter Stark Program in 2007. She began her career in development at DreamWorks and with Academy Award producer Bruce Cohen. She produced and co-directed the feature film DIRT!, featuring Jamie Lee Curtis, which was nominated for the Grand Jury Prize at the Sundance Film Festival before premiering on PBS's Independent Lens. She then developed and produced Swelter, an action film starring Alfred Molina, Catalina Sandino Moreno, Lennie James, Grant Bowler and Jean-Claude Van Damme.

Dailly is a member of Producers Guild of America, the Academy of Television Arts and Sciences, Women in Film. She co-chairs the Alliance of Women Directors (AWD), a non-profit company promoting parity for female directors that partners with Women In Film and the Sundance Initiative for Women Directors. Other members of the AWD include Debra Granik, Michelle McLarren, Leslie Linka Glatter and Ava DuVernay. Dailly now runs the production outfit Autopilot which focuses on television and feature film development. She also coordinated publicity for FX's Emmy-nominated television series Justified.

=== Law ===
Dailly received her Juris Doctor degree from Columbia University School of Law in 1998, with a focus on intellectual property and finance law. While at Columbia, she worked with Jane Carol Ginsburg, as her research assistant on issues of intellectual property law. Dailly then practiced international civil litigation in New York City for Sullivan & Cromwell and Morrison & Foerster and human rights law in Argentina, Kenya and Uganda.

== Awards ==
In 2007, Dailly was awarded the Debra Hill Fellowship for promising, young female filmmakers for her work on feature film development.

== Filmography ==
- Dirt! The Movie
- Swelter
- Sister Cities
- Je Ne Suis Pas Un Homme Facile
- Voltaire High
- I Love America
- Les Liaisons Dangereuses
