= Ratcliff Highway murders =

Murders during 1811 in London, England

Coordinates: 51°30′33″N 00°03′45″W

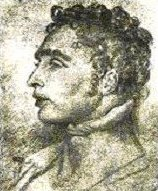
- Postmortem sketch of John Williams, supposed murderer
- Date: 7 and 19 December 1811
- Location: Wapping, London, England
- Also known as: John Murphy
- Outcome: Declared guilty after dying by suicide in prison, 28 December 1811
- Deaths: Timothy Marr, Celia Marr, Timothy Marr (3 mos.), James Gowan, John Williamson, Elizabeth Williamson, and Bridget Anna Harrington

The Ratcliff Highway murders (sometimes Ratcliffe Highway murders) were two attacks on two separate families – the Marr and Williamson families – that resulted in seven fatalities. The two attacks occurred twelve days apart in December 1811, in homes located half a mile apart near the East End area of Wapping, London, England, United Kingdom. The main suspect in the slayings, John Williams, killed himself before he could be put on trial.

== First attack ==
The first attack took place on 7 December 1811 in the living quarters behind a linen draper's shop at 29 Ratcliffe Highway, on the south side of the street between Cannon Street Road and Artichoke Hill. Ratcliffe Highway was the old name for a road in the East End of London, now simply called "The Highway", then one of three main roads leaving the city. The road was in a dangerous and run-down area of seedy businesses, dark alleys and dilapidated tenements.

The victims of the first murders were the Marr family. Timothy Marr, whose age was reported as either 24 or 27, had previously served several years with the East India Company (EIC) aboard the trading ship Dover Castle, and now kept a linen draper's and hosier's shop. Marr had a young wife, Celia; a 14-week-old son, Timothy (who had been born on 29 August); an apprentice, James Gowan; and a servant girl, Margaret Jewell. All had been living at 29 Ratcliffe Highway since April of that year.

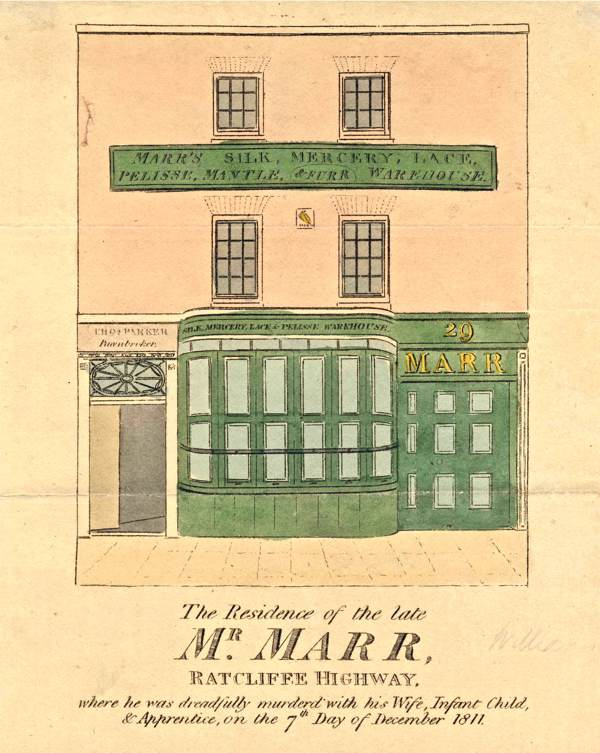
Newspaper sketch of the Marr mercer shop and residence

Just before midnight on 7 December 1811, the Marrs were in their shop and residence when an intruder entered their home. 7 December fell on a Saturday, then pay day for many British working people and the busiest day of the week for shopkeepers.

Jewell was not present at 29 Ratcliffe Highway because she had just been sent to purchase oysters as a late-night meal for Marr and a treat for his young wife, who was still recovering from childbirth. Jewell was then to go to a nearby bakery at John Hill and pay an outstanding bill. One report stated that as she opened the shop door she saw the figure of a man framed in the light. As the entire area was usually busy after normal business hours, Jewell took no notice and went on with her errand. Finding the oyster shop closed, she walked back past the Marrs' home, where she saw her employer through the window, still at work, and went to pay the baker's bill. Finding the baker's closed, Jewell decided to go to another shop in a final attempt to find some oysters, but, after finding that shop shuttered as well, she returned empty-handed.

Arriving at the shop at twenty minutes past midnight, Jewell found the building dark and the door locked. Thinking that the Marrs had forgotten that she was still out, she knocked, but received no answer. Jewell initially heard no movement inside, then a noise that sounded like footsteps on the stairs, so she assumed that someone was coming to let her in. She heard the baby upstairs cry out. However, no one came to the door. Hearing footsteps on the pavement behind her, Jewell became frightened and slammed the knocker against the door "with unintermitting violence", drawing attention to herself. George Olney, a night watchman who called out the time every half-hour, came to find out who she was. Olney, who knew the Marrs well, knocked at the door and called out, but noticed that the shutters were in place yet were not latched. The noise awakened John Murray, a pawnbroker and Marr's next-door neighbour. Alarmed, he jumped over the wall that divided his yard from 29 Ratcliffe Highway, and saw a light on and the back door standing open. Murray entered and went up the back steps, calling to the Marrs that they had neglected to fasten their shutters. He heard nothing.

Returning downstairs and entering the shop, Murray beheld "the carnage of the night stretched out on the floor". The "narrow premises ... so floated with gore that it was hardly possible to escape the pollution of blood in picking out a path to the front door." He first saw Gowan, the apprentice, lying on the floor about five feet from the stairs, just inside the shop door. The bones of the boy's face were smashed, his blood was dripping onto the floor, and his brains had been pulverised and cast about the walls and across the counters.

Murray went to the front door to let Olney in, but stumbled across another corpse, that of Celia Marr. She lay face down, her head battered, her wounds still emitting blood. Murray let in Olney and together they searched for Timothy Marr. They found him behind the shop counter, battered to death. Murray and Olney rushed to the living quarters, and found the infant dead in his crib, which was covered with blood. One side of the infant's face had been crushed and his throat had been slit so that his head was nearly severed from his body.

By the time Murray and Olney discovered the infant, more people from the neighbourhood had gathered outside and the Thames River Police were summoned. The first officer on the scene was Charles Horton. As nothing appeared to have been taken – money was in the till and £152 was found in a drawer in the bedroom – there seemed to be no motive. A thief might have been scared off before he finished, but the other possibility was some sort of revenge attack by someone who knew Timothy Marr.

Horton initially believed that the weapon used had been a ripping chisel. One was found in the shop, but it was clean. In the bedroom he found a heavy, long-handled shipwright's hammer, or maul, covered with blood, leaning against a chair. Horton assumed this was the murder weapon, abandoned when Jewell's knocking scared the killer away. Human hairs were stuck in the drying blood on the flat, heavy end, and the tapered end, used for driving nails into wood, was chipped.

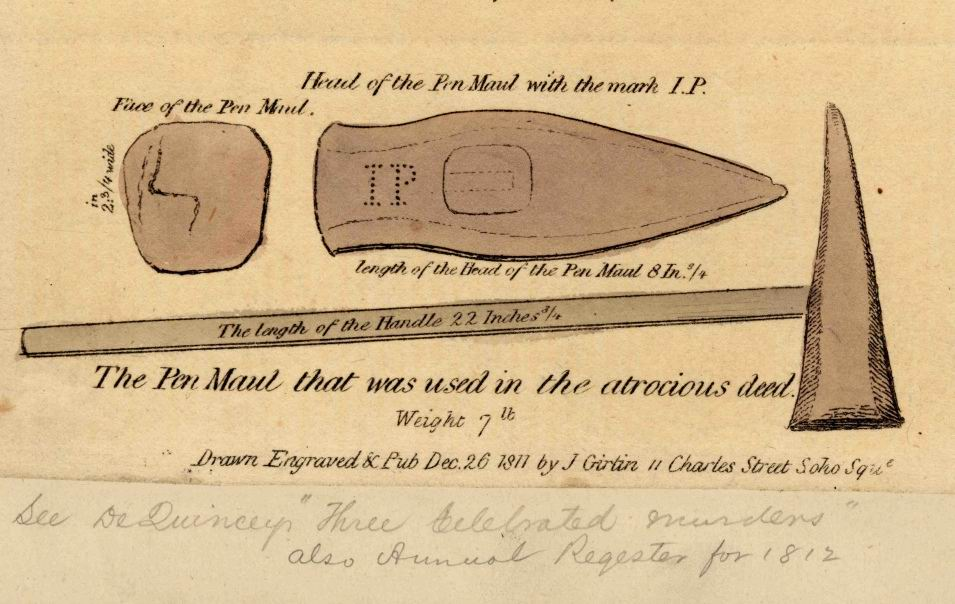
Contemporary newspaper illustration of the pen maul used in the first murders, showing the initials "IP" or "JP"

Two sets of footprints were then discovered at the back of the shop. These appeared to belong to the killers, as they contained both blood and sawdust from carpentry work done inside earlier in the day. A group of citizens followed the tracks to Pennington Street, which ran behind the house, and found a possible witness who reported that he had seen a group of some ten men running away from an empty house in the direction of New Gravel Lane (now Glamis Road) shortly after the alarm had been raised. Speculation now arose that the crime was the work of a criminal gang. Horton took the bloodstained maul back to his station to find that three sailors, who had been seen in the area that night, were in custody. One appeared to have spots of blood on his clothing, but all three had convincing alibis and were released. Other men were apprehended in the area on the basis of witnesses' reports, but the cases against them also fell apart. A reward of 50 guineas was offered for the apprehension of the perpetrator, and, to notify area residents, a handbill was drafted and stuck on church doors.

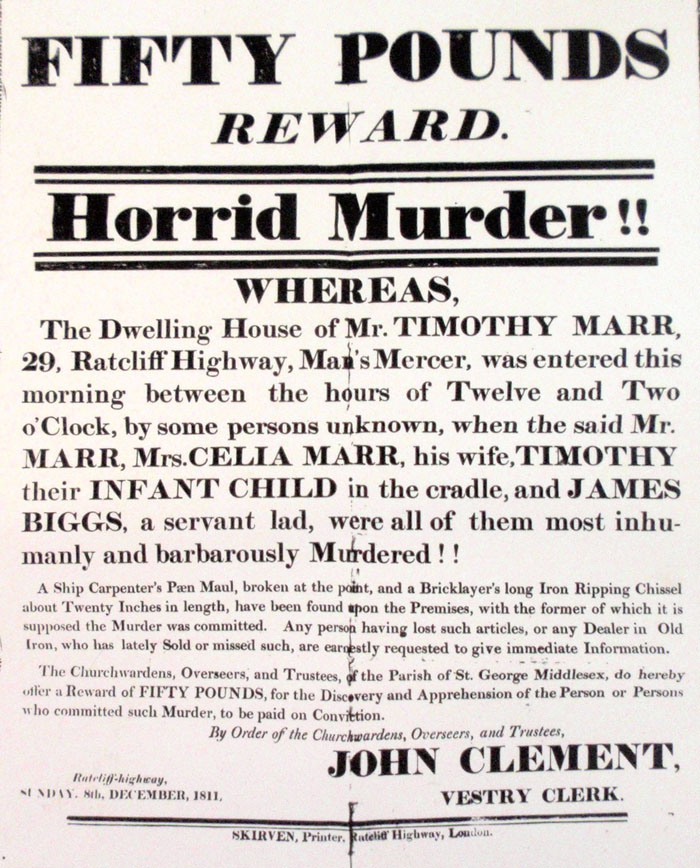
Reward notice for £50 for information regarding the Marr murders. James Gowan, Marr's apprentice, is misidentified as "Biggs".

== Investigation ==
On 10 December a coroner's jury heard that someone must have been watching the shop and residence for an opportunity. The crime had been committed between 11:55 p.m., when Jewell left, and 12:20 a.m., when she returned. Murray stated that he had heard bumping noises around 12:10 a.m., so it was decided that the killers had still been in the home when Jewell returned and had fled out the back door.

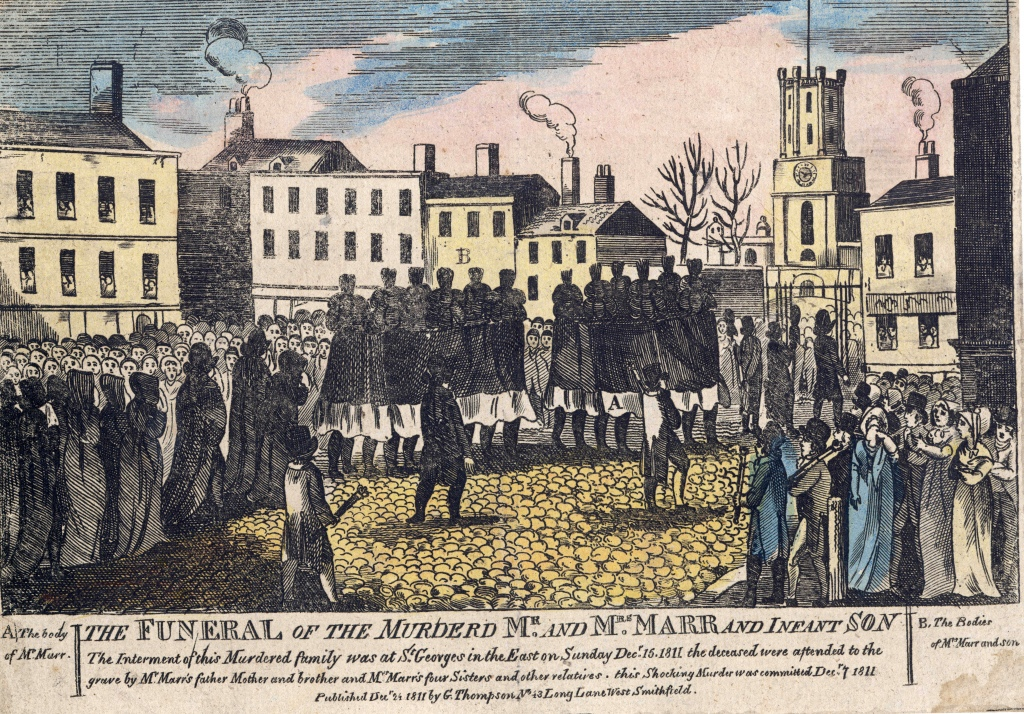
The Marr funeral procession on Sunday, 15 December 1811

An attempt was made to trace the maul by the chip in its blade. There was no blood on the chisel, but since Jewell stated that Marr had been looking for one earlier that evening, it was thought that it was brought to be used as a weapon, since if it had been in plain sight, he would have found it. Cornelius Hart, one of the carpenters who had worked in the shop that day, was detained, but no case could be made against him and he was released. Marr's brother also came under scrutiny, since he was rumoured to have had a disagreement with him, but after being interrogated for forty-eight hours, he was exonerated because he had a firm alibi. A servant girl who had previously been let go was also questioned, but she lacked motive as well as criminal companions, and was too small to have performed the murders by herself.

The four victims were given a memorial service, then buried beneath a monument in the parish church of St. George in the East, where the infant had been baptised three months earlier. When the maul was cleaned on Thursday 19 December it appeared that some initials were carved into the handle, perhaps with a seaman's coppering punch: "I.P." or "J.P." Those who were working on the case now had a way to try to trace the owner.

== Second attack ==
The same night the initials were discovered on the maul, and twelve days after the first killings, the second set of murders occurred at The King's Arms, a tavern at 81 New Gravel Lane (now Garnet Street). The victims were John Williamson, the 56-year-old publican, who had run the tavern for fifteen years; Elizabeth, his 60-year-old wife; and their servant, Bridget Anna Harrington, who was in her late 50s. The King's Arms was a tall two-storey building, but despite its proximity to the Highway it was not a rowdy establishment, as the Williamsons liked to retire early.

Earlier that night Williamson had told one of the parish constables that he had seen a man wearing a brown jacket lurking around the place and listening at his door. He asked the officer to keep an eye out for the stranger and arrest him. Not long afterwards the same constable heard a cry of "Murder!" As a crowd gathered outside The King's Arms a nearly naked man descended from the upper floor using a rope of knotted sheets. As he dropped to the street, he was crying incoherently. He was John Turner, a lodger and journeyman who had been at the tavern for some eight months.

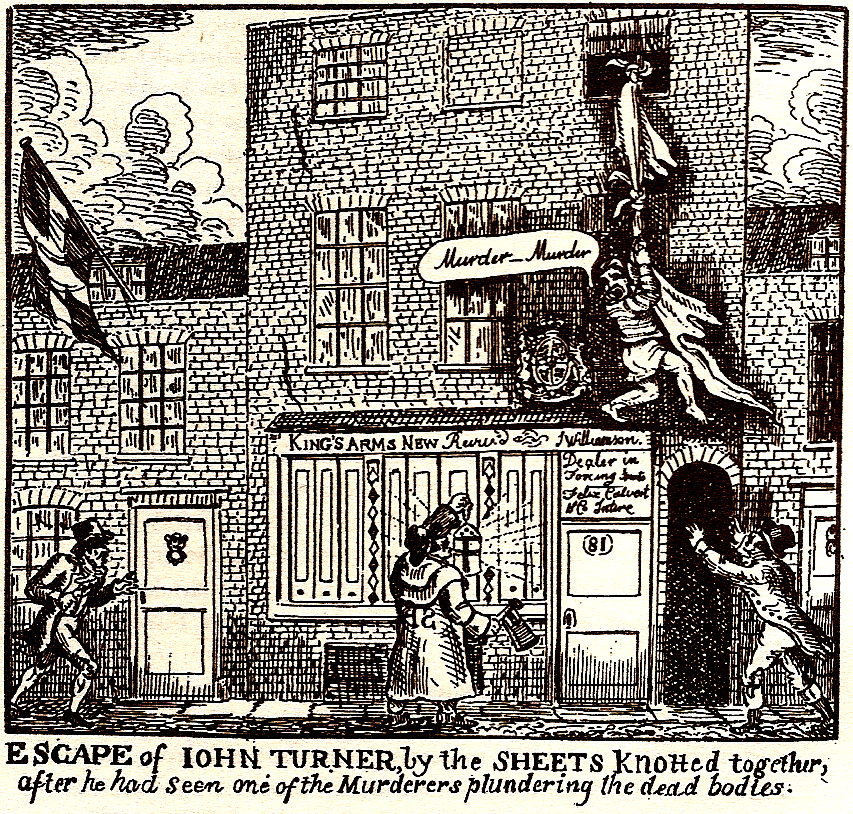
Newspaper illustration of the escape of John Turner from the second murder scene at the King's Arms.

The crowd forced the tavern doors open and saw the body of John Williamson lying face up on the steps leading into the taproom. His head had been beaten and his throat had been cut, and there was an iron crowbar lying at his side. While the crowbar appeared to be the weapon used to beat him, a sharper implement had been used to slit his throat and nearly hack off his hand. Elizabeth Williamson and the maid were found in the parlour, their skulls smashed and their throats cut. The maid's feet were beneath the grate, as if she had been struck down while preparing the fire for the next morning. Her mistress's neck had been severed to the bone.

The crowd armed themselves and stormed through the inn in search of possible perpetrators. They then discovered the Williamsons' 14-year-old granddaughter, Catherine Stillwell, in her bed, alive and untouched. Given what had happened to the Marr family twelve days earlier, it seemed miraculous that she had slept through the entire attack and had no idea what had just occurred downstairs. The bodies were placed on their beds and the girl was taken to a safer home. Fire bells were rung to call out volunteers, while London Bridge was sealed off. Acting on eyewitness accounts that a tall man had been loitering outside the tavern that night, wearing a flushing coat (a loose-fitting, hooded garment), several Bow Street Runners were assigned to hunt down the murderer. According to one report, Turner claimed that he had shouted for help, scaring the killer away. He also reportedly stated that he had seen the tall man near Mrs Williamson's corpse, but he was also viewed as a suspect and his report was not given its full weight.

Entry to the premises was found to have been gained by forcing open the cellar flap. An open window was discovered, with bloodstains on the sill indicating the murderer's escape route, and a footprint in the mud outside seemed to confirm this. The unknown assailant apparently escaped by running along a clay-covered slope, so it was assumed by the police that he would have got clay all over his clothing, making him easy to identify. It was pointed out that this type of escape route was similar to the one taken by the person who had murdered the Marr family. There were no known connections between the two families, and there was also no apparent motive for this second slaughter. As Mr Williamson's watch was missing and both crimes had been interrupted, they might still have started off as simple robberies.

A haphazard task force was assembled, composed of constables from various parishes and a group of Bow Street Runners. They quickly arrested a suspect who lived in the area, had recently purchased a gallon of brandy and had recently cleaned trousers to get rid of what a local doctor claimed were bloodstains. No forensic tests existed to test his theory, but the man was detained anyway. Other witnesses claimed that they had seen two men running up Ratcliff Highway that night, a tall man with a limp and a shorter man, but the descriptions were vague and did not result in any clear leads. Local magistrates convened and quickly offered another reward of 100 guineas, double the amount of the reward in the case of the Marr family, for information leading to the capture of the culprit, and handbills were drafted and posted within the hour. Rewards were offered by three different parishes for information, including two other offers of £50.

== Survivor's testimony ==
Richard Ryder, the Home Secretary, responded to public panic and pressure and appointed Aaron Graham, a Bow Street magistrate, to the inquiry. London newspapers focused on the crimes for some three weeks, and a coroner's inquest was called at The Black Horse, a tavern across from The King's Arms. Turner claimed that he had entered The King's Arms at about 10:40 on the night of 19 December and had gone to his room on the upper floor. He had heard Mrs Williamson lock the door, then heard the front door bang open "hard" and Bridget shout, "We are all murdered!". Williamson then exclaimed, "I am a dead man." As he lay in bed listening, Turner heard several blows. He also heard someone walking about, but so quietly that he believed their shoes had no nails. (The shoe print outside was made by a shoe with nails.) After a few minutes he left his bed and went to investigate.

As Turner crept down the stairs, he heard three drawn-out sighs and saw that a door stood open, with a light shining on the other side. He peered in and caught a glimpse of a man he estimated was six feet tall, wearing a dark flushing coat, leaning over Mrs Williamson and going through her pockets. Turner saw only one man before going back up the stairs. Rather than become a victim as well, he then tied two sheets together in his bedroom and lowered himself out of the house. He knew that Mr Williamson's watch was missing and described it, but could not recall there ever being a crowbar in the tavern like the one found next to the corpse. The conclusion was that it must have been brought there by the killer.

Those who had seen the corpses testified and the surgeon who had examined them also gave his report. The jury returned a verdict of willful murder by a person or persons unknown.

== Suspect ==
A principal suspect in the murders, John Williams (also known as John Murphy), was a 27-year-old Irish or Scottish seaman and a lodger at The Pear Tree, a public house on Cinnamon Street off the Highway in Old Wapping. Williams' roommate had noticed that he had returned after midnight on the night of the tavern murders. Thomas De Quincey claimed that Williams had been an acquaintance of Timothy Marr, and described him as: "a man of middle stature, slenderly built, rather thin but wiry, tolerably muscular, and clear of all superfluous flesh. His hair was of the most extraordinary and vivid colour, viz., a bright yellow, something between an orange and a yellow colour". The Times was more specific: he was five-foot-nine, slender, had a "pleasing countenance," and did not limp. Williams had nursed a grievance against Marr from when they were shipmates, but the subsequent murders at The King's Arms remain unexplained.

On 23 December, the Shadwell Police Office examined Williams as well as several other suspects. Williams had two pawn tickets on his person, some silver coins and a pound note. His last voyage had been on Roxburgh Castle, an EIC trading ship, and he had narrowly escaped being part of a failed mutiny attempt. Williams was educated and had a reputation for being honest, as he always paid for his rooms, and was popular with women. He had been seen drinking with at least one other man at The King's Arms shortly before the murders, so he was subjected to an intense interrogation. Williams was of medium height and slight build, so his description in no way matched Turner's description of a large man in a dark flushing coat. He said that he had never denied being at The King's Arms that evening, but the Williamsons considered him a family friend. Mrs Williamson had even touched his face that night in a motherly gesture. What aroused suspicion was Williams' earlier mention that he had no money, although he was seen to have some after the murders. He claimed that he had pawned articles of clothing afterwards, offering the pawn tickets as proof, and that after he had left the tavern that evening he had consulted a surgeon about an old wound, as well as a woman with some knowledge of medicine. No one investigated this alibi or checked the dates on the pawn tickets.

Despite his insistence that he was innocent, Williams was remanded to Coldbath Fields Prison, also known as the Clerkenwell Gaol, where another suspect was also incarcerated. The police were still not sure how many men were involved and confined three suspects in all.

== Break in the case ==
On 24 December, more than two weeks after the Marr family had been murdered and five days after the killing of the Williamson family, the maul was identified as belonging to a sailor named John Petersen, who was away at sea. The information was volunteered by a Mr Vermiloe, the landlord of The Pear Tree, who was incarcerated in Newgate Prison for debt. Constables searched the premises and found Petersen's trunk, which was missing a maul. Vermiloe recalled that not only had the maul been in the chest, but that he himself had used it and was responsible for chipping it. That was a significant lead. It has been noted that the substantial reward money for information leading to the arrest of the murderers would have cleared Vermiloe's debts.

Before an open forum of witnesses that day, Turner was asked if he could identify Williams as the man he had seen standing over Mrs Williamson. He could not, but did state that he knew Williams from earlier visits to the tavern. Williams's laundress was called to see if she had washed any bloody clothing. She said that two weeks earlier she had noticed that one of his shirts was torn and that another had blood on the collar, as if from bloody fingers. She assumed that Williams had been in a fight. She had not washed any clothing for him since before the Williamsons were murdered. Williams claimed that the torn and bloodstained shirts were the result of a brawl after a card game, but he was silenced by the magistrates and returned to prison.

The facts in evidence against Williams were that he had had an opportunity to take the maul, that he had money after the murders but not before, that he had returned to his room just after the killer had fled the second crime scene, and that he had had bloody and torn shirts. Although an attempt was made to identify the maul and ascertain whether any of Williams's shirts had blood stains on them, the courts could not assess forensic evidence and gave great weight to eyewitnesses' statements.

== Suicide ==
Williams never went to trial. On 28 December he used his scarf to hang himself from an iron bar in his cell. No one discovered this until just before he was to be taken for another hearing before the Shadwell magistrates. An officer announced to the court that the accused was dead and that his body was cold. Williams' suicide surprised everyone who had spoken to him. Several prisoners and a warden said that he had appeared to be in good spirits only the day before, believing that he would soon be exonerated and released. This led to later speculation that Williams was murdered to prevent authorities from looking elsewhere.

The hearing continued despite the dead man's inability to defend himself. The Times reported that a secret prison correspondence had been discovered between Williams and one of the other suspects, "which clearly connects them with the shocking transactions". Another man who had shared the room at The Pear Tree with Williams said that he had found his own stockings muddied and hidden behind a chest, and concluded that Williams had worn his stockings out that night and got them dirty. He claimed that after he confronted Williams he immediately took them into the yard and washed them. Their landlady confirmed these statements and added that, while the stockings were quite muddy, she had also seen blood on them. She explained that she had not told anyone about this before Williams's death because she feared that he might kill her. A female witness who knew Williams well connected him with a chisel that was proved to have been taken from the same seaman's chest as the maul.

The court finally declared Williams guilty of the crimes, taking his suicide as a clear statement of his guilt. The cases against other suspects collapsed and, although Williams had not previously been connected with the murders of the Marr family, he was deemed the sole perpetrator of both.

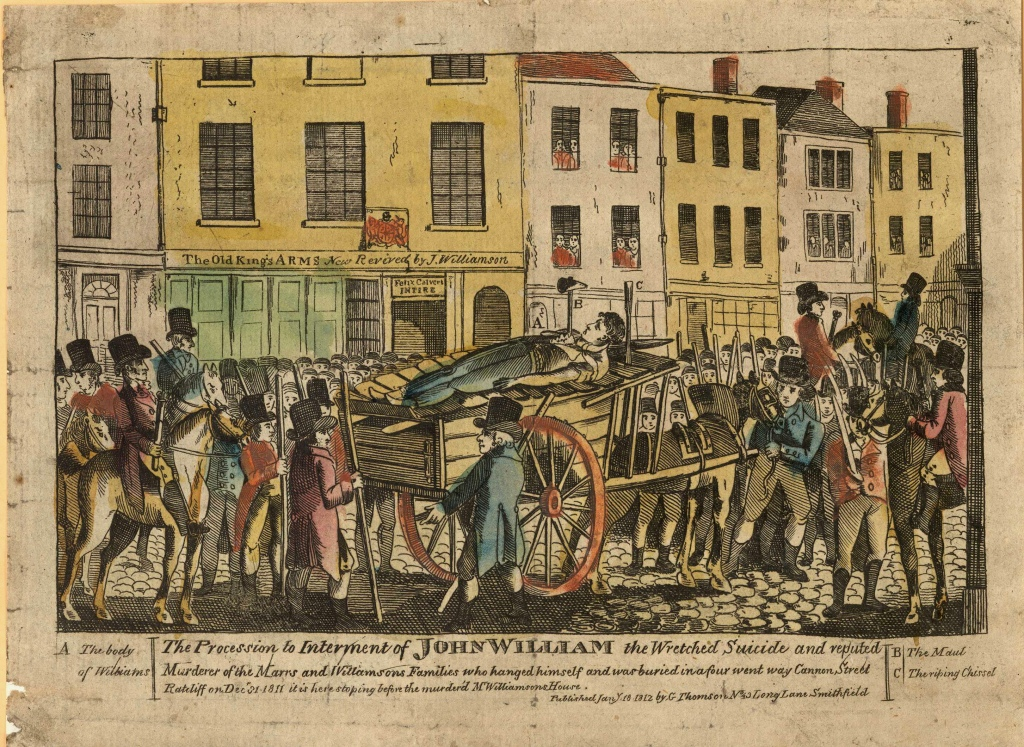
Burial procession of John William [sic], showing the cart stopping before the King's Arms.

The Home Secretary was more than happy to agree with the opinion of the bench, and decided that the best way to end the matter was to parade Williams's body through Wapping and Shadwell so that the residents could see that while he had "cheated the hangman", he was indeed dead and no longer a menace. The Thames River Police, the Bow Street Mounted Patrol, and local constables and watchmen were ordered to oversee the event.

On New Year's Eve, Williams's body was removed from the prison at 11 a.m., with "an immense concourse of persons", said to total 180,000, taking part in a procession up the Ratcliffe Highway. When the cart carrying the body drew opposite the Marr family house, the procession halted for nearly a quarter of an hour. A drawing was made that shows, not the slender man described in newspaper accounts, but a stocky labourer. In his pocket was a piece of metal that he had apparently ripped from the prison wall to stab himself with, in the event that he was unsuccessful at hanging himself.

When the cart came opposite the late Mr Marr's house a halt was made for nearly a quarter of an hour. ... The procession then advanced to St George's Turnpike, where the New Road [now Commercial Road] is intersected by Cannon Street Road. Those who accompanied the procession arrived at a grave already dug six feet down. The remains of John Williams were tumbled out of the cart and lowered into this hole, and then someone hammered a stake through his heart.

— Thomas De Quincey

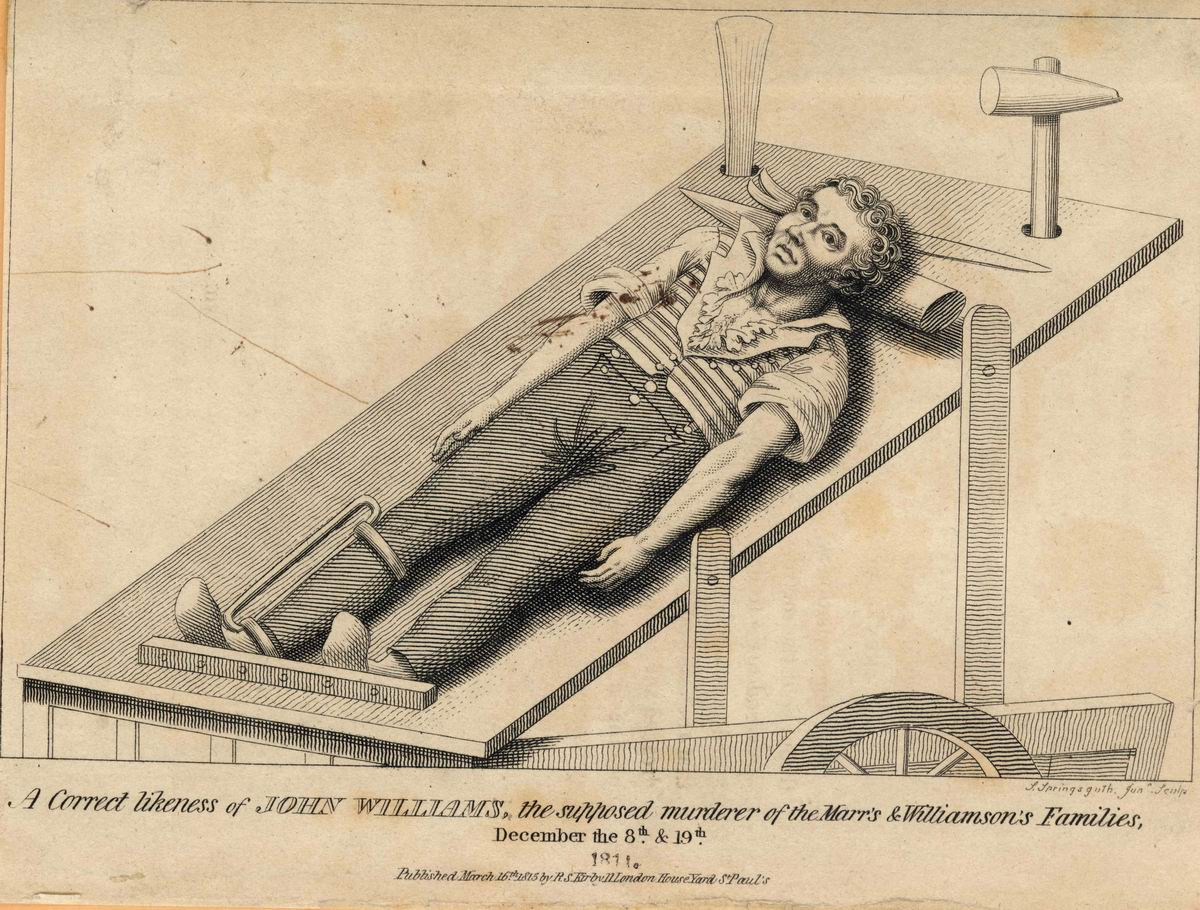
Sketch of John Williams' corpse on the death cart, along with the murder implements of pen maul, ripping chisel and iron crowbar. This representation of a stocky labourer was published 4 years after the event and does not match his physical description, that of a slender man. The date of the first murder is also incorrect.

Suicides could not be buried in consecrated ground. The stake was meant to keep the restless soul from wandering, while the crossroads were meant to confuse whatever evil ghost arose from the grave. In addition, the grave was deliberately made too small for the body, so that the murderer would feel uncomfortable even in death. Quicklime was added and the pit was covered over. The procession also stopped for ten minutes in front of The King's Arms, where the coachman reportedly whipped the dead man three times across the face.

In August 1886, a gas company began to excavate a trench in the area where Williams had been buried. They accidentally unearthed a skeleton, reportedly buried upside down and with the remains of the wooden stake through its torso. "It was six feet below the surface of the road where Cannon Street Road and Cable Street cross at St George's in the East." The landlord of The Crown and Dolphin, a public house at the corner of Cannon Street Road, is said to have retained the skull as a souvenir. The pub has since been renovated and the whereabouts of the skull are currently unknown.

== Some alternative suspects ==
John Williams's arrest would have interested two other people involved: Cornelius Hart and William "Long Billy" Ablass.

- Hart, who had done carpentry work at the Marrs' shop on the day of the murders, claimed to have lost a chisel and made several enquiries about its whereabouts to Marr. Jewell testified that Marr searched his shop that night, but could find no trace of it. When Hart had visited the shop on the morning after the murders, he found the chisel placed in a prominent position and removed it as evidence. Hart always denied any particular dealings with Williams, although other witnesses provided a link between the two. Following Williams's arrest Hart enquired at The Pear Tree whether Williams was being retained in custody.
- Ablass was a seaman who had sailed with Williams aboard Roxburgh Castle. He had a history of aggressive behaviour and had been involved in the unsuccessful mutiny aboard the ship, and was placed in confinement afterwards, while Williams was thought to have simply been led astray by his shipmates. Ablass was drinking in company with Williams at The King's Arms on the night of the murders, and was a far better match for Turner's description of the killer. He was also lame, matching the earlier eyewitness description of one of the men running up the Highway after the first murders, and was unable to account for some of his time on the nights of both murders. He was detained as a suspect. When evidence emerged that Marr, Williams and Ablass had all served together as seamen before Marr went into business on his own, it was suggested that there were links, and possibly old scores to settle, between the three.

== Puzzling motivation ==
The motive for the Ratcliff Highway Murders has remained a mystery, and a cause for speculation for detectives and crime buffs. Colin Wilson theorised that Williams was syphilitic and harboured a grudge against humanity. P.D. James and Critchley, however, believe that the proceedings were conducted quickly in order to close the case and appease the frightened public. An early eyewitness insisted that the two men seen on the road outside The King's Arms had spoken, and one had called out what sounded like a name, possibly "Mahoney" or "Hughey". Williams's name did not sound like that, but once he was in custody the report was ignored. Williams had misrepresented himself on occasion and could have been using an alias. Following a lead about two men walking up the street together, who were not proved to have had anything to do with the murders, authorities ignored the facts about the open tavern window and the footprint in the mud outside. James and Critchley believe that it was possible someone else had perpetrated the assaults, making Williams merely a tragic and unfortunate pawn.

In January 1812 the authorities still felt a need to prove that Williams had committed the murders. The weapon, either a razor or knife, that was used to cut the throats of the victims, and clearly linked to Williams, became the sought-after piece of evidence. A police officer stated that he had originally found a knife like that in the pocket of Williams's coat, but had not seen it since. Newspaper accounts of this testimony shifted from calling the weapon a razor, which they took from the surgeon's reports, to claiming that the wounds had been clearly made with a sharp knife. Eventually a knife was indeed found, and was said to have blood on it, but whether it had actually belonged to Williams or had been planted in his room to confirm his guilt is still unknown.

== In media and popular culture ==
The murders and the murderer are analyzed by Thomas De Quincey in his famous essay On Murder Considered as one of the Fine Arts (1827). The murders and Charles Horton are featured in Lloyd Shepherd’s historical novel, The English Monster (2012). The murders are featured in Lona Manning’s historical novel, A Marriage of Attachment (2018).

The murders are mentioned (albeit with a supernatural element) in KJ Charles’s Magpie Lord series; in Peter Ackroyd's Dan Leno and the Limehouse Golem as a motivation of the murderer; in Arthur Conan Doyle’s first Sherlock Holmes novel, A Study in Scarlet; in Fergus Hume's The Mystery of a Hansom Cab; in Alison Goodman's novel The Dark Days Club; and in G.K. Chesterton's "Father Brown" stories, The Blue Cross and The Mirror of the Magistrate.

The murders are repeatedly referenced in Alan Moore's graphic novel From Hell, where Sir William Gull speculates that the murders were a false flag operation of sorts committed by the Freemasons in order to spur on the creation of the modern police force and thus further the organization's authoritarian agenda.

The murders provided the backdrop for the first two episodes of the third series of British television drama Whitechapel in 2012. They were also given a fictionalised treatment in Lloyd Shepherd's first novel, The English Monster (2012). The murders are central to the story in David Morrell's thriller, Murder as a Fine Art, published in 2013.

== See also ==
- St George in the East
- The Highway (London)
- Ratcliff
- Wapping
- The Maul and the Pear Tree
