= Innocent Blood (novel) =

1980 mystery novel by P. D. James

- Cover of the first edition, published by Faber & Faber.
- Author: P. D. James
- Language: English
- Publication date: 1980

Innocent Blood (1980) is a crime novel by English writer P. D. James. Unlike her Adam Dalgliesh mysteries it is not a detective story but closer to a psychological thriller and was the first of James' novels to step outside the detective genre. (She had published a non-fiction account of a real crime, The Maul and the Pear Tree, in 1971.) It follows the story of a young woman searching for her biological roots, having known since childhood that she was adopted, and the dark truths that she uncovers.

== Premise ==
Philippa Palfrey was adopted as a child and grows up being taught that she was the illegitimate daughter of an aristocrat. When she turns eighteen she decides to use her legal right to pursue the truth of her origins, but places herself in danger when her missions come up against the interests of people who'd rather she never find out who she is.

== Literary significance and criticism ==
The novel received generally positive reviews. Polymath and mystery fan Jacques Barzun reviewed it thusly in his A Catalogue of Crime: "P. D. James chose to write a novel in which crime might figure but would not be the mainspring of the action. The work is a great success with the public and with the connoisseurs. ... The diverse characters are admirably drawn and the author's fingerwork in tying and untying threads is as deft as her touches of sordid life and as nimble as her prose."

Though critical of the more genre-based elements of the plot, Maureen Howard in The New York Times of April 27, 1980, wrote: "The curious thing is that P. D. James is gifted in the techniques of the traditional novel, can create place, gives great attention to significant detail and the pacing of her narrative, but seems to mistrust her own art and run for the cover of artifice. London is beautifully seen, the bus routes and parks, the smart dinner party and third-rate hotel. The city as she renders it is more than background, more than a movie set: vandals roam the streets at dawn, and so do enigmatic ladies in evening dress; it is alive with terror and good fortune."

In 2008, Tana French chose Innocent Blood as one of her "top 10 maverick mysteries", in an article for The Guardian, ranking it alongside such works as The Talented Mr. Ripley and The Daughter of Time as an example of a crime novel that defies "all the thriller's conventions".
