= Stephen Susco =

American screenwriter and film director

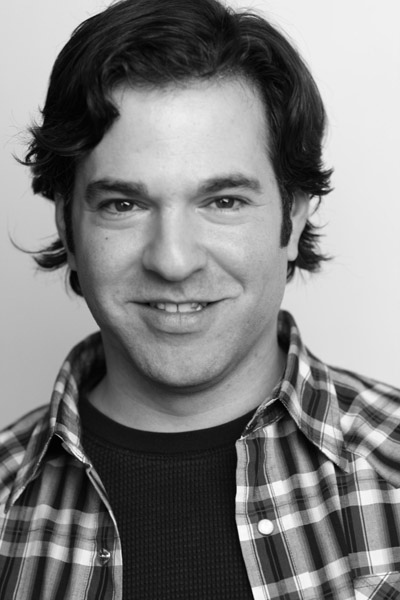
- Susco in 2007
- Born: October 24, 1972 (age 54); United States
- Education: University of Notre Dame
- Occupations: Screenwriter; Film director
- Spouse: Bridget Foley (m. 2005)
- Children: 2

Stephen Susco (born October 24, 1972) is an American screenwriter, producer, and director. He is best known for writing horror films such as The Grudge, The Grudge 2, and Texas Chainsaw 3D. His directorial debut film, Unfriended: Dark Web, had its premiere at SXSW on March 9, 2018.

== Early life and education ==
Susco graduated from the University of Notre Dame in 1995 and from USC School of Cinematic Arts in 1999.

== Career ==
Susco appears as a character in Jonathan Maberry's Ghost Road Blues trilogy, alongside Ken Foree, Jim O'Rear, Tom Savini, and Debbie Rochon. Susco also wrote the 2008 film Red and then he wrote Texas Chainsaw 3D, which released in 2013 by Lionsgate. He wrote the storybook to the Paramount Pictures project The Butcherhouse Chronicles. He also co-wrote and co-produced the Adrien Brody film, High School. In 2018, his directorial debut film, Unfriended: Dark Web premiered at SXSW on March 9.

== Personal life ==
Susco married author Bridget Foley in 2005. They live in Bellevue, Washington and have two children.

== Filmography ==
=== Short film ===
Producer

- Mr. October (1996)

Executive producer

- Last Call (2007)

=== Feature film ===
Year	Title	Director	Writer	Executive Producer
2004	The Grudge	No	Yes	No
2006	The Grudge 2	No	Yes	No
2008	Red	No	Yes	No
2010	High School	No	Yes	Yes
2013	Texas Chainsaw 3D	No	Story	No
2014	Beyond the Reach	No	Yes	Yes
2018	Unfriended: Dark Web	Yes	Yes	No
2018	Hell Fest	No	Story	No
2026	Do Not Enter	No	Yes	No
2026	Black Box	No	Yes	Producer
2027	The Descendant	No	Yes	Yes

Associate producer

- Intoxicated Demons (2005)

Co-producer

- The Possession (2012)
