= On Murder Considered as one of the Fine Arts =

1854 essay by Thomas de Quincey

On Murder considered as one of the Fine Arts
- Author: Thomas de Quincey
- Language: English
- Subject: Crime
- Genre: Essay
- Publisher: Blackwood
- Publication date: February 1827
- Publication place: United Kingdom
- Pages: 14
- Anthology: Selections Grave and Gay, Volume 14 Miscellanies (1854)
- Preceded by: "On the Knocking at the Gate in Macbeth"
- Followed by: "A Second Paper on Murder Considered as one of the Fine Arts"
- Text: On Murder considered as one of the Fine Arts at Wikisource

"On Murder Considered as one of the Fine Arts" are a trilogy of essays by Thomas De Quincey begun in 1827. The essays are a satirical account of a gentleman's club that celebrates homicide from an aesthetic perspective. The Ratcliff Highway murders of 1811 are a keystone throughout the series.

== Background ==
When he was editor of The Westmorland Gazette in 1818, De Quincey made a point to expand the paper's normal remit into covering trials for murder and sex crimes. Five years later, De Quincey used John Williams' massacre as a lens for viewing Macduff's arrival at a crime scene in "On the Knocking at the Gate in Macbeth".

In 1827, he revisited the Williams murders in "On Murder Considered as one of the Fine Arts". In the same issue of Blackwood's Magazine, de Quincey also published "The Last Days of Kant", whose work he studied closely. "On Murder" is a prolonged satire of Kant's aesthetic theory. The essay was enthusiastically received, and the following year, de Quincey pitched a sequel of sorts. He wrote "Peter Anthony Fonk" in a reportorial style based on a German murderer recorded in the Conversations-Lexikon. De Quincey submitted the Fonk manuscript with "To the Editor of Blackwood Magazine", a satirical cover letter written in the same vein as "On Murder". William Blackwood rejected both.

Blackwood's sons inherited the magazine. In August 1838, they published de Quincey's short story "The Avenger", which features multiple household massacres like those on Ratcliff Highway. In November 1839, Blackwood's Magazine ran another sequel by the author: "Second Paper on Murder Considered as one of the Fine Arts". In 1844, De Quincey wrote a fragment, "A New Paper on Murder as a Fine Art". He planned but never completed a larger work called Confessions of a Murderer.

James Hogg recalled that when de Quincey was frequently depressed, he could reliably cheer him up and prod him to write by inquiring after the doomed Baker in "On Murder". He would ask, "What would the Baker say?"; de Quincey would perk up and reply, "Well, that is a good idea. We have not yet considered what can be done from that point of view." When de Quincey and Hogg were anthologizing his work in 1854 as Selections Grave and Gay, he edited and expanded "On Murder". It appears in the fourth volume of Selections along with a "Postscript" which doubles the size of the original essay and retells John Williams' killing spree in chilling prose.

== Synopsis ==
=== On Murder (1827) ===
The essay is styled as a lecture to The Society of Connoisseurs in Murder, a copy of which "fell into the hands" of a concerned citizen who has forwarded it to Blackwood's Magazine in an attempt to expose their perfidy. His cover letter is signed, "X.Y.Z."

The speech is formally titled "The Williams' Lecture on Murder, considered as one of the fine arts", and it begins by dismissing the moral concerns of the subject by ridiculing Immanuel Kant's position on lying to conceal a victim from his potential murderer. The speaker proposes to merely consider murder from an aesthetic perspective. He points to woes like fires, thefts, and ulcers, "to be imperfect being their essence, the very greatness of their imperfection becomes their perfection."

The lecture moves into a pocket history of murder, beginning with Cain whose work is rated as "so so". He laments the lack of improvement in the art for centuries until the Old Man of the Mountain.

As a way of showing off, the lecturer detours into a history of the assassination of philosophers, beginning with the attempt on René Descartes's life. He invents an assassination attempt for Kant. He speculates that Baruch Spinoza was murdered for his valuables. He laments that, despite Thomas Hobbes' recurring fear of being killed, no one bothered to murder the author of Leviathan.

The lecture resumes with a discussion of modern crimes, drawing on sources like The Newgate Calendar. He also relates the story of an amateur murderer who picks a baker as his victim. The baker defends himself by boxing 26 rounds with his attacker but is deceased when the 27th begins. He discusses the titular spree of John Williams and talks about how John Thurtell's crime provoked an impromptu gathering of the Society. One member harrumphed that Thurtell's work was unoriginal.

The speech concludes with a primer on choosing victims and circumstances for murder. The speaker believes a good murder must satisfy Aristotle's notion of catharsis. He ends by saying the only murder he was ever able to commit was of a cat who was eating bread during a famine and laments that he is unfit for "the higher departments of the art".

=== Second Paper (1839) ===
Styled as a letter to "Mr. North" (the pseudonymous editor of Blackwood's), the second paper on murder is written by the author of the purloined speech in the first essay. He defends his morality, insisting he only appreciates the aesthetic qualities of murder and never commits it. He also dissuades aspirants to the art, "For if once a man indulges himself in murder, very soon he comes to think, little of robbing; and from robbing he comes next to drinking and Sabbath-breaking, and from that to incivility and procrastination."

A curmudgeonly member of the Club known as "Toad-in-the-Hole" was such a recluse the other members assumed he had gone mad and committed suicide. In 1812, the Ratcliff Highway murders inspired Toad's return to the Club. He insisted on a celebratory dinner. The secretary who recorded the dinner went missing and was presumed murdered. The rest of the essay is an adaptation of the author's notes from an 1838 dinner in honor of Thugs, when Toad-in-the-Hole is well over 100 years old.

A glee was composed in reference to the missing secretary from 1812. The Club joyously sings it throughout the dinner, particularly when Toad-in-the-Hole quotes the chorus as a punchline. Toasts are given to Joseph von Hammer-Purgstall (a Thug scholar); the Sicarii; the Club Committee which had written a report on murder weapons; "Burkism and Harism"; and finally to "Thugdom in all its branches". Toad-in-the-Hole got so excited he began shooting pistols and calling for his blunderbuss. The Club decided he was going mad again and kicked him out. The writer encloses an epigram from the Greek Anthology that prefigured Burke & Hare by a millennium.

=== Postscript (1854) ===
Writing as himself, De Quincey defends the extremism of satire in his first two essays, citing Jonathan Swift's precedent. Because they are forty years in the past, he rehearses the Ratcliff Highway murders.

John Wilson hurries through the night to No. 29 Ratcliff Highway. He is well-dressed with a mallet under his surtout. He is headed to a hosier shop owned by Mr. Marr who lives there with his wife and 8-month-old baby. There is also a teenaged apprentice and a serving girl named Mary. As Marr closes the shop, he sends Mary out for oysters. When she returns, the shop is locked. She knocks and hears someone approach from inside. She grows alarmed and convinced that something is wrong. She wakes a neighbour who climbs the garden wall to investigate.

He finds the rear door opened and the inhabitants of the house slaughtered. Their heads have been smashed and their throats slashed, even the infant. London is horrified by the massacre. 30,000 people attend the Marrs' funeral the following week. Just four days later another slaughter occurs on Ratcliff Highway.

Mr. Williamson runs a tavern with his wife and a housemaid. They have a 9-year old granddaughter and there is a journeyman boarding with them. Wilson begins by throwing Williamson down the stairs of the cellar and slashing his throat. The maid cries out, waking the journeyman who goes downstairs to investigate.

He witnesses the murderer in the parlour trying to unlock various drawers. The maid and Mrs. Williamson are dead at his feet. The journeyman hurries back to his room, climbs out his window, and alerts passersby that the Marrs' murderer is at work. A mob forms and the murderer leaps out a window to escape.

Wilson is soon caught because he has returned to his boarding house, despite stealing over a hundred pounds. He hangs himself in gaol. The essay concludes with a brief summary of the M'Keans' murder of a servant girl during a home invasion. They panic when a boy flees the house and abandon their robbery attempt. They are soon caught and executed.

== Reception ==
"On Murder" is considered one of De Quincey's masterpieces and particularly emblematic of his idiosyncratic genius. David Macbeth Moir praised William Blackwood for having the nerve to publish the essay. Shadworth Hodgson pointed out the similarity of de Quincey's humor method to Charles Lamb, in that both writers "imagine the contrary, the contrast, of what he is describing, thinks what it might appear to spectators with different interests..." De Quincey imagines thieves intruded on by unsuspecting tourists, and the murderer considered by the aesthete.

De Quincey's "Postscript" to the Murder papers has been described as "magnificent" and "immortal". Thomas Burke judged it the "finest 'horror' short story in English".

== Legacy ==
De Quincey's murder essays exerted a strong influence on literary representations of crime and were lauded by writers like Charles Lamb, G. K. Chesterton, and Wyndham Lewis. They are parodied or cited by name in works by George Orwell ("Decline of the English Murder"), Malcolm Lowry (Under the Volcano), Vladimir Nabokov (Despair), Iain Sinclair (Lud Heat), Peter Ackroyd (Hawksmoor), and Philip Kerr (A Philosophical Investigation). Edgar Allan Poe parodied De Quincey's essays in "Diddling Considered as One of the Exact Sciences". Often seen as the beginning of detective fiction, Poe's "The Murders in the Rue Morgue" (1841) is inspired by de Quincey's essays. De Quincey was writing in a nascent style of reportage that prefigured the similar "New Journalism" by a century. Truman Capote's In Cold Blood is as much a descendant of de Quincey as Poe's work.

The 1964 French film On Murder Considered as One of the Fine Arts takes its name from the essay.
