= James Hogg (publisher) =

Scottish publisher (1806–1888)

James Robert Hogg
- Born: March 1806
- Died: March 1888 (aged 81–82)
- Occupation: Publisher

James Robert Hogg (26 March 1806 – 14 March 1888) was a Scottish publisher.

== Life ==
James Robert Hogg, the son of James Hogg, was born near Edinburgh on 26 March 1806, and educated under Rev. Thomas Sheriff (died 1836) who became minister of Fala, in the presbytery of Dalkeith, in 1828. On 24 Aug 1818 Hogg was bound as an apprentice to James Muirhead, a printer in Edinburgh. He subsequently entered the book house attached to the Caledonian Mercury, where the printing of the seventh edition of the Encyclopedia Britannica had been commenced in 1827, and became a reader on the Caledonian Mercury.

In 1837, he commenced business on his own account as a printer and publisher in Edinburgh. The first publication which bears his imprint is The Honest Waterman, a small tract brought out in 1837. On 1 March 1845 appeared the first number of Hogg's Weekly Instructor, an unsectarian periodical of promise. In 1849 the title was changed to the Instructor; later on it was known as the Titan. The last number is dated December 1859, and the entire work is comprised in 29 volumes. Hogg was his own editor, being in the later part assisted by his eldest son, James. He also published the principal works of George Gilfillan.

In 1849, he made the acquaintance of Thomas De Quincey. To the Weekly Instructor De Quincey contributed his Autobiographic Sketches and other papers, and then agreed with Hogg to bring out his Collected Works.

In 1858, Hogg's printing office was discontinued, and in the autumn of that year his sons John and James (1829–1910), who had been taken into partnership, established a branch publishing office in London, where Hogg later moved the whole business. Besides other works, including the Churchman's Family Magazine, the firm now published several series of successful juvenile books, and the periodical entitled London Society: An Illustrated Magazine of Light and Amusing Literature for the Hours of Relaxation, which was edited by James Hogg, jun., in February 1862. One of the most popular journals of its time, at one point it attained a monthly circulation of 25,000 copies. The firm of James Hogg & Sons was dissolved in July 1867.

Hogg married Helen Hutchison (1803–1890) of Hutchiestown Farm, near Dunblane, on 13 November 1832. He died at the residence of his son John, The Acacia, Crescent Road, St. John's, Kent, on 14 March 1888.
