= The Maul and the Pear Tree =

1971 book by P. D. James and T. A. Critchley

First edition (published by Constable)

The Maul and the Pear Tree: The Ratcliffe Highway Murders, 1811 is a true crime book by the British historian T. A. Critchley and the mystery writer P. D. James about the Ratcliff Highway murders, published in 1971. According to the publisher's blurb, it is "one of the most elegant exercises in literary historical detection since Josephine Tey's The Daughter of Time". James and Critchley worked together as civil servants at the Home Office and were able to draw upon original sources when writing the book.
