= Deep Red (disambiguation) =

Deep Red is a 1975 giallo film

Deep Red may also refer to:

- Deep Red (1994 film), an American science fiction film
- Deep red, a shade of red
- DR Studios, a video game developer formerly known as Deep Red Games
- Jessica 6 (band), a dance music group formerly known as Deep Red
- "Deep Red", a 1994 single by Apoptygma Berzerk
- Deep Red, a horror film magazine published by FantaCo Enterprises
- Profondo Rosso (store), a horror film memorabilia store, translated from Italian as Deep Red
- Profondo Rosso (soundtrack), a soundtrack album for the 1975 film
