= Villa Scott =

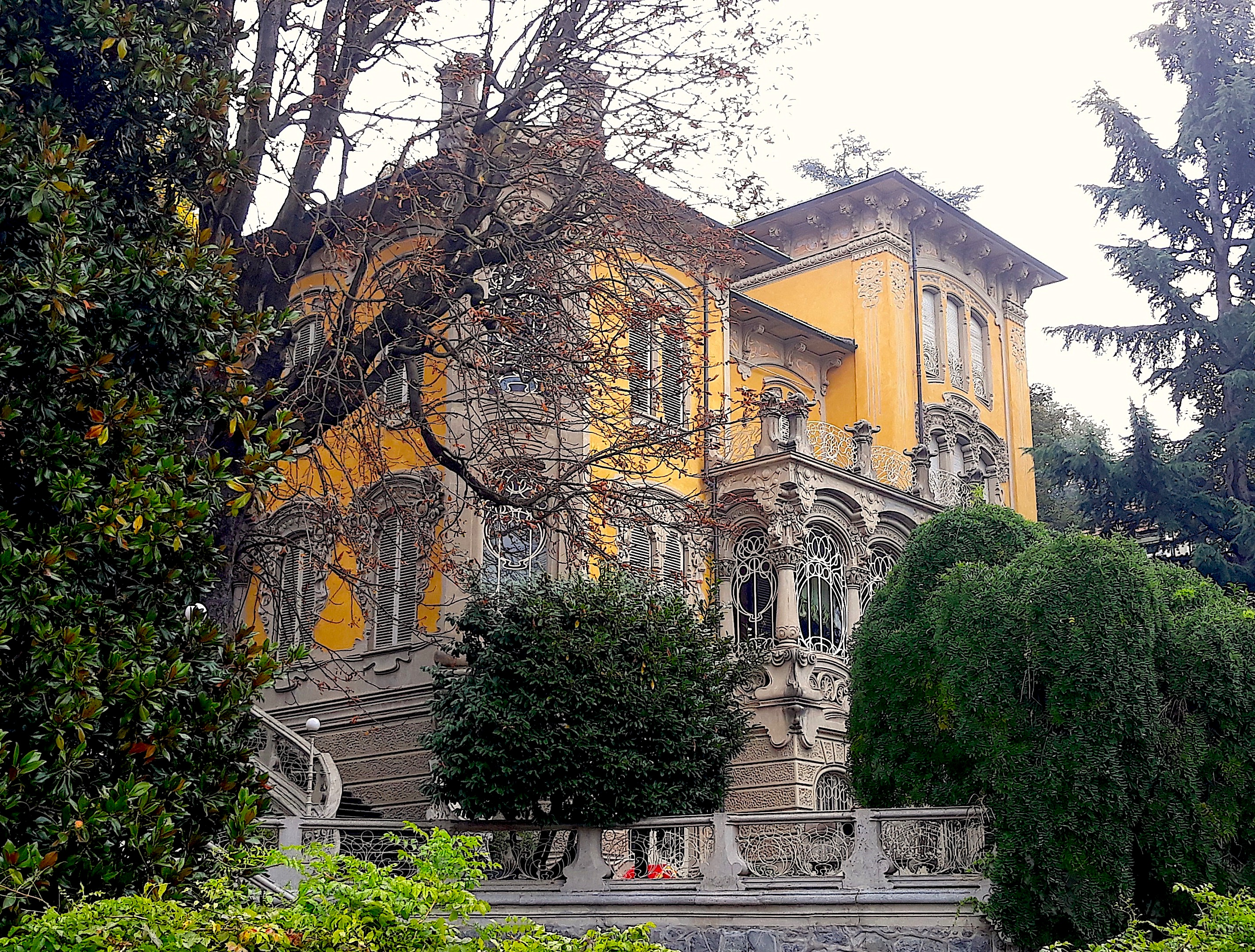
- The Villa Scott seen from the Corso Giovanni Lanza

- Location within Turin Location within Italy
- Former names: Villa Fatima

General information
- Type: Villa
- Architectural style: Liberty Style
- Location: Corso Giovanni Lanza 57, Turin, Piedmont, Italy
- Coordinates: 45°3′26″N 7°41′55″E
- Completed: 1902

Design and construction
- Architect: Pietro Fenoglio
- Other designers: Guttardo Gussoni

The Villa Scott is a historic house located in a prestigious hillside location in the Cavoretto district in the larger Borgo Crimea (or Borgo Po) east of central Turin, Piedmont, Italy. Built in 1902, it is considered to be a masterful example of Liberty Style architecture in Turin, one of the major works of the architect, engineer, and businessman Pietro Fenoglio.

== History ==
The hillside on which the villa sits was urbanized during the late nineteenth and early twentieth centuries, and is noted for its numerous villas for the upper class and bourgeoisie. The villa was built for Alfonso Scott, an executive with the nascent auto company S.T.A.R. (Società Torinese d'Automobili "Rapid"), by the architect Pietro Fenoglio, who sat on the board of S.T.A.R., in collaboration with fellow engineer Guttardo Gussoni.

Upon Scott's death, his heirs ceded the property to the Sisters of the Redemption (Suore della Redenzione), who used it as a girls' boarding school, known by the name Villa Fatima.

At the beginning of the twenty-first century, the villa was privately acquired and underwent a major project of restoration and conservation. In 2017 the house was bought by the Banca Generali, becoming part of the company's large portfolio of real estate, and in 2022 it was sold to a group of London-based real estate investors.

== Design and location ==
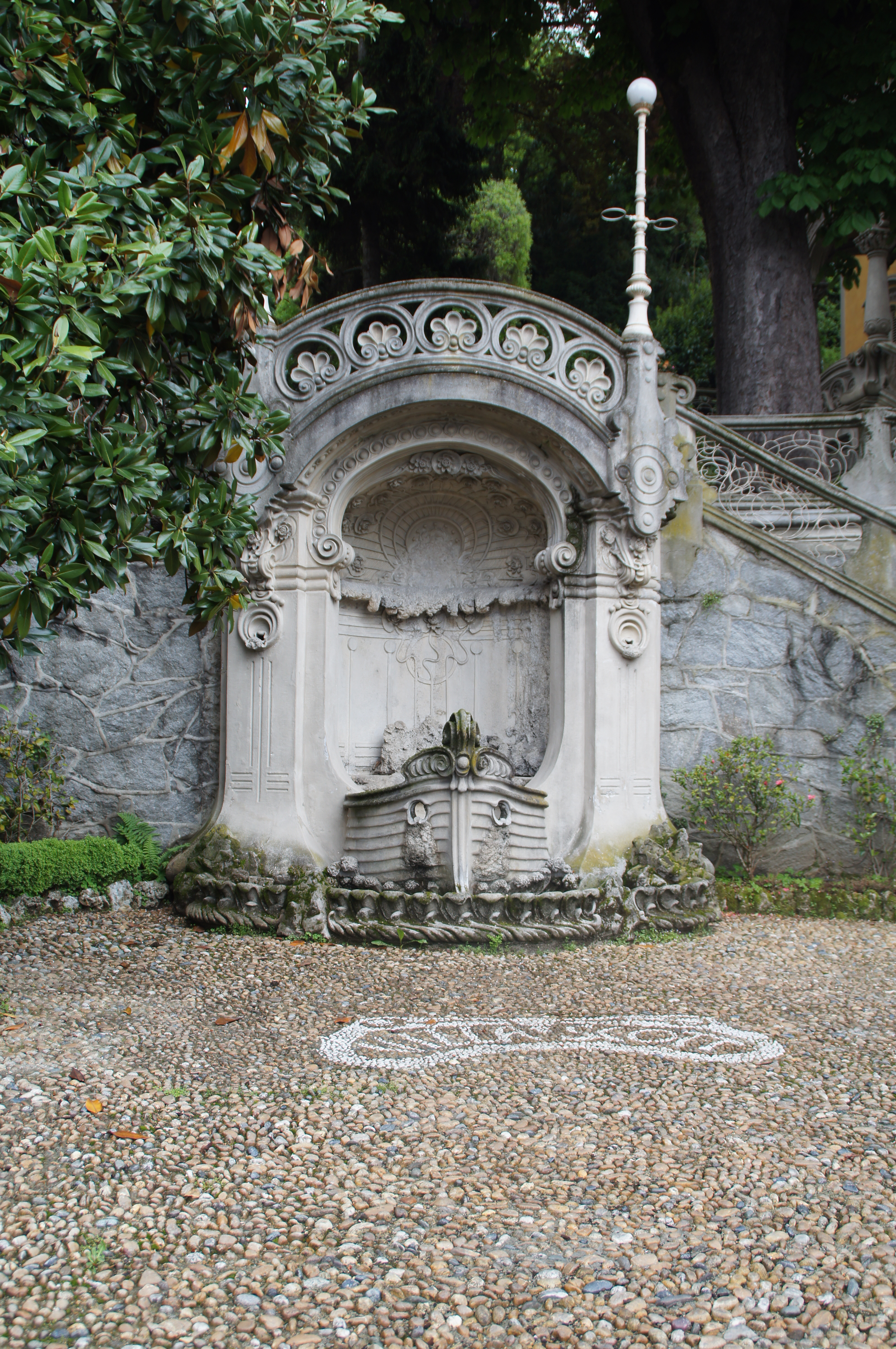
Fountain besides the entrance gate to the Villa Scott.

The villa is located in an exclusive residential neighborhood at the foot of a hillside along the Corso Giovanni Lanza, and immersed in a large surrounding green garden. The structure itself is characterized by a profusion of articulated plantlike forms, in line with the tendencies of the Liberty Style, which is most visible in the profusion of loggias, oriel windows, stained glass, and floral decoration.

The main building is set back above and behind a small dependent structure located at street level, intended for the concierge, from the side of which rises an elegant and sinuous staircase. It is in this element which one most clearly can see the influence of Victor Horta, as well as Fenoglio's skill in negotiating the twenty-four meters' disparity in height between the entrance gate and the edge of the upper garden.

This rapid change in grade must have inspired Fenoglio, who conceived the building as a harmonious alternation of volumes that present, in each window, typical Liberty Style elements, punctuated by lithocement hoods with floral forms and the free use of wrought iron.

The two lateral turreted volumes are arranged around a prominent central oriel window, surmounted by a terrace, which corresponds to the shape of the floorplan below. The main facade is loaded with decorative elements but this load of decoration is lightened considerably towards the bottom. The entrance is located at the left side, in front of a wide staircase, while the right wing rises four floors above ground level and is marked by three bays of expansive windows with three lights, one of which has an elliptical form, but all characterized by the richness of floral details in stucco. The left wing, by contrast, has just two bays and only rises three stories.

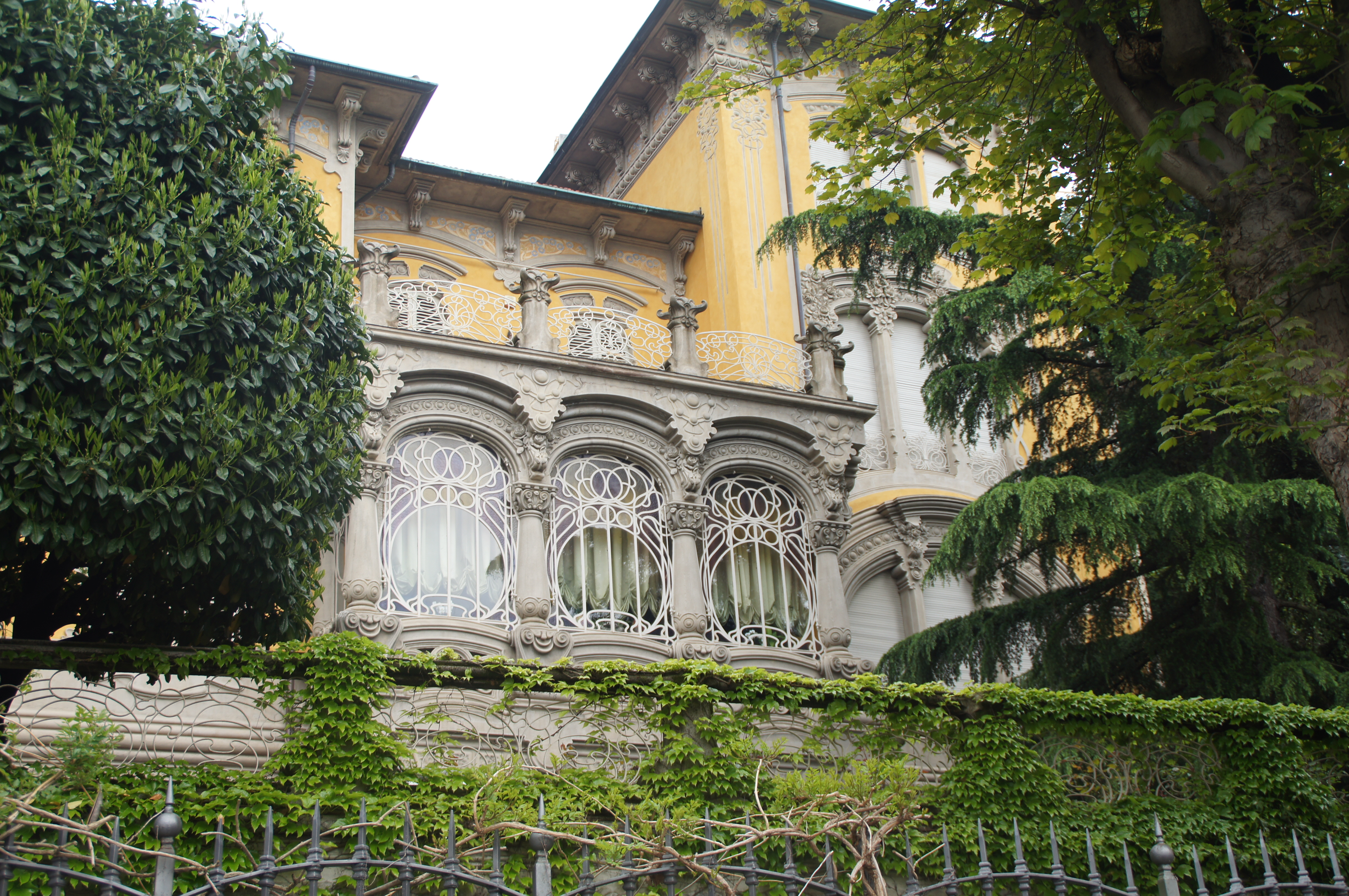
Windows of the Villa Scott facing the Corso Giovanni Lanza.

The distribution of internal spaces of the house is more traditional, in spite of the irregular floor plan. The internal decoration originally featured a variety of floral motifs in stucco and a large use of tapestries and wood floors. Originally the ground floor (slightly sunken in the rear to accommodate the uneven terrain) housed the kitchen and other service spaces, such as the pantry, cellar, and heating system. The main living space on the other hand, was centered around the large two-story high entrance hall, which opened onto the staircase and faced the garden. Connected to it were the large hall, the living rooms on the first floor, and the bedrooms, with their bathrooms and dressing rooms on the second floor. Finally, the top floor contained the attic, reserved for the service staff.

Unlike its contemporary, the Casa Fenoglio-LaFleur, the architectonic particularity of the Villa Scott is accentuated by the fusion of the prevalent Liberty Style in the plasticity of design elements with a hint of Baroque-revival forms, as if to want to establish a clear link with Savoyard architecture. The result is thus a quasi-eclectic strand of Liberty Style, analogous with the distribution of volumes and stylistic tendency of Fenoglio's Villino Raby, completed the previous year (1901) also in collaboration with Gussoni. Above all, unlike the latter building, the Villa Scott shows more of the eclectic influence of Gussoni but is clearly recognizable also for its architects knowledge of the Belgian developments by those such as Horta and Paul Hankar, as seen in the audacious use of glass and metal, as well as the decorative fitting in wrought iron of the veranda, which are strongly influenced by the work of French architect Hector Guimard.

== In other media ==
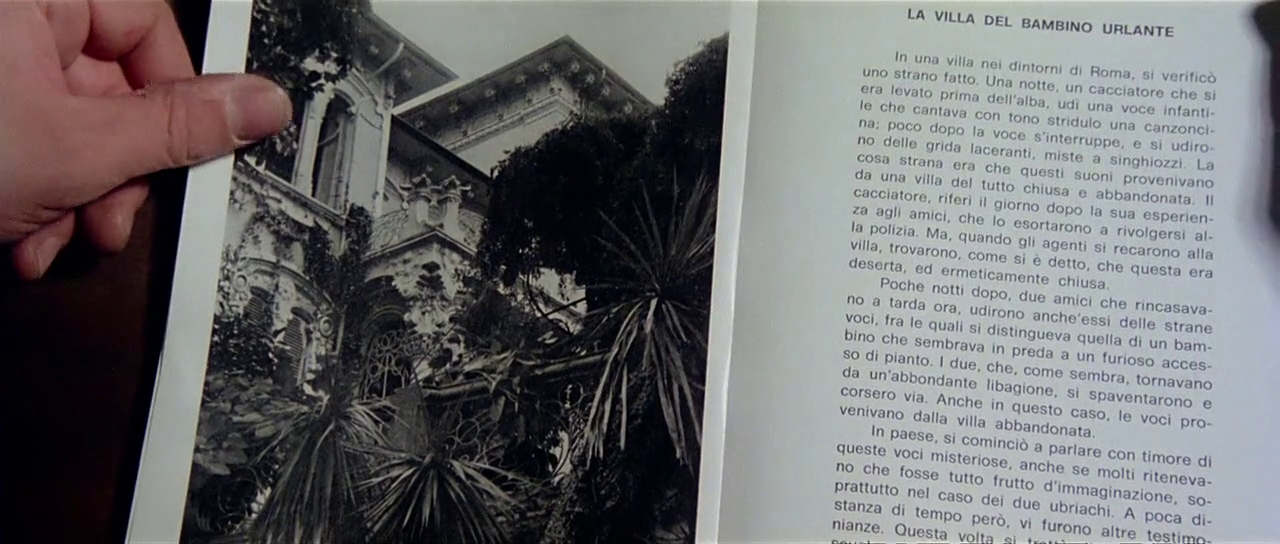
Still from Deep Red showing printed page with the Villa Scott as the "Villa del Bambino Urlante."

Villa Scott appears in Deep Red (Profondo Rosso), a 1975 film directed by Dario Argento, as "the villa of the screaming child", an abandoned building in the countryside around Rome; concealed inside are a corpse and a child's drawing, pieces of evidence in a decades-old murder case. In order to shoot the scenes at the time, the production paid for a holiday period in Rimini to the Sisters of the Redemption and to all the girls attending the boarding school.

== Bibliography ==
- Fahr-Becker, Gabriele. Art Nouveau. Cologne: Könemann, 1999.
- Nelva, Riccardo, and Bruno Signorelli. Le opere di Pietro Fenoglio nel clima dell'art nouveau internazionale. Bari: Dedalo Libri, 1979.

== See also ==
- Automotive industry in Italy
