= Michel Altieri =

Italian actor, singer, and musician

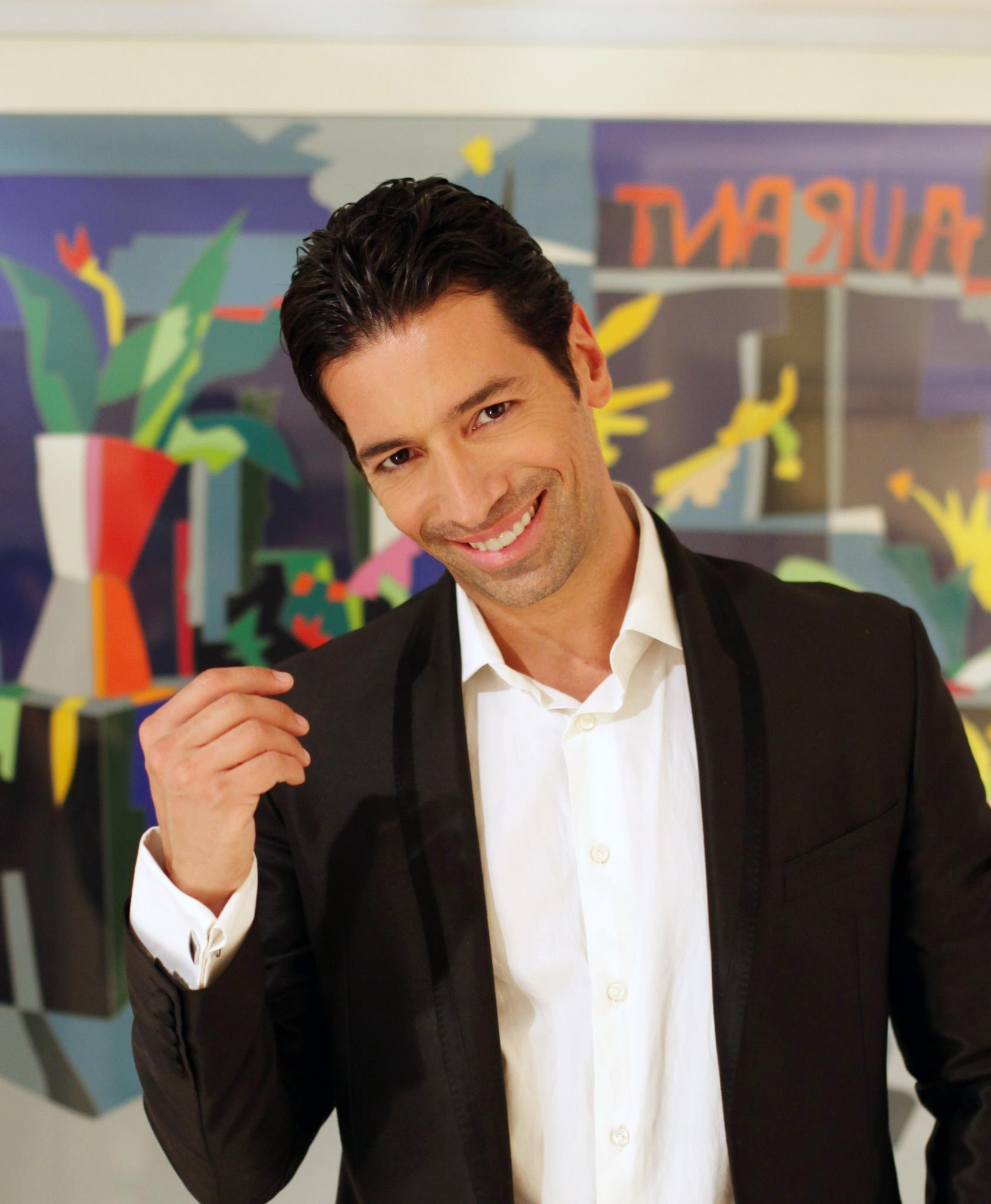
Michel Altieri 2017

Michel Altieri (born 16 June 1974 in Bari, Italy) is an Italian actor, singer and musician. After a career in musical theatre, straight plays, TV, and film in Italy and Europe, he is now primarily based in New York City where he continues to work and teach. Altieri became a naturalized U.S. citizen in 2016.

== Education ==
He studied voice with Maestro Luciano Pavarotti, Emiliana Perina, Luca Jurman and Bob Marks; he also studied acting with Anna Strasberg, Dennis Hopper, Kuniaki Ida and Narcisa Bonati from Piccolo Teatro, Milan. He is also well known for his long-time collaboration with Naples' historic Bellini Theatre as the company's resident young leading man, under the direction of Tato Russo.

== European career ==
Born to a French mother and Italian father, Altieri grew up in Italy. In Italy, Michel was discovered and mentored by Luciano Pavarotti and Pavarotti's wife, Nicoletta Mantovani, to star as "Collins" for two seasons in the musical Rent, which the Pavarottis were producing. After his debut in Rent, he went on to star in other musicals such as I Promessi Sposi (The Betrothed, role of "Renzo") for three seasons, then in the role of "Dorian" in the original musical based on Oscar Wilde's novel The Picture of Dorian Gray for four seasons, next in Profondo Rosso (Deep Red), and originated the role of the "Beast" in the first ever Italian production of the Disney Broadway musical Beauty and the Beast, which during its year-long run in Milan broke box-office history for ticket sales. Starring roles in straight plays include "Christian" in Cyrano de Bergerac, "Alberto" in Due Dozzine di Rose Scarlatte, and "Rocco" in Rocco e i Suoi Fratelli (based on the Visconti film Rocco and His Brothers). These roles earned him a series of awards and recognition such as the Italian Tony (Italian Musical Theatre Award) for Best Male Lead in a Musical, the Rome-Europe Award, the Massimini Award, honorary recognition from Milan's La Scala Theatre's "Amici della Lirica", as well as a scholarship to study at the NYC Lee Strasberg Institute, awarded him by Anna Strasberg and Dennis Hopper.

== New York career ==
He made his New York debut in the winter of 2010/2011 in the play Dracula as the title role, opposite George Hearn, Thora Birch, Timothy Jerome, John Buffalo Mailer, Jake Silbermann, and Emily Bridges, at the Little Shubert Theatre on Theatre Row.

In 2011, he played Mammothland in Shawn Cody's The Water Dream, with Anthony Rapp, directed by Thomas Caruso at the Peter Jay Sharp Theatre.

In 2012, he plays Poseidon in Annah Feinberg's The Beautiful Beautiful Sea Next Door, directed by Barbara Harrison at the Gloria Maddox Theatre

== Professional work ==
In addition to his stage work, he is also recognized for his TV work on dramatic series and sitcoms (Camera Cafè, Piloti, Il Bene e il Male, Il Giudice Mastrangelo, Il Pugile e la Ballerina, Tawanna Ray, Linea di Confine), and studio work including singing on five commercially marketed original cast albums and numerous individual recording projects.

=== Theatre ===
- Rent by Jonathan Larson, directed by Michael Greif – (2000–2001) – Role: Tom Collins
- I promessi sposi from Alessandro Manzoni, directed by Tato Russo (2000–'01–'02–'03) – Role: Renzo Tramaglino
- Mille e una favola, directed by Franco Travaglio (2001) – Role: Berthyl de Lise
- The Portrait of Dorian Gray from Oscar Wilde, directed by Tato Russo (2002–'03–'04–'05 -'06) – Role: Dorian Gray
- Rocco e i suoi fratelli by Giovanni Testori, directed by Antonio Syxty (2003–2004) – Role: Rocco
- Mambo y Salsa by Giacomo Frassica, directed by Giacomo Frassica (2005) – Role: Norman
- Profondo rosso – by Dario Argento and Claudio Simonetti, directed by Marco Calindri (2007–'08) – Role: Mark Harris
- Due dozzine di rose scarlatte by Aldo De Benedetti, directed by Livio Galassi (2009) – Role: Alberto Verani
- Beauty and the Beast – Musical Disney, directed by Glenn Casale (2009–2010) – Role: Beast
- Dracula by Bram Stoker, directed by Paul Alexander -Little Shubert Theatre – New York (2010–2011) – Role: Dracula
- The Water Dream by Shawn CodyThomas Caruso -Peter Jay Sharp Theatre – New York (2011) – Role : Mammothland
- The Beautiful Beautiful Sea Next Door by Annah Feinberg, directed by Barbara Harrison -Gloria Maddox Theatre -New York (2012) – Role : Poseidon
- Zorro The Musical, directed by Fabrizio Angelini – Europe – 2013 – Role: Zorro
- The Best of Musical, directed by Chiara Noschese– Europe – 2014/15 – Role: Tony Manero/ Beast
- Midsummer Night's Circus from William Shakespeare, directed by Marco Bellocchio (2016) – Role: Oberon
- Cyrano de Bergerac by Edmond Rostand, directed by Corrado D'Elia (2017) – Role: Christian
- Flashdance, Musical by Stage Entertainment, directed by Chiara Noschese (2018/19) - Role: C.C.
- Rent by Jonathan Larson, directed by Michael Greif – (2020) – Role: Tom Collins

=== Movies ===
- Spiral, by John Buffalo Mailer, directed by David Ambrose (2011)
- Il pugile e la ballerina, directed by Francesco Suriano (2006)
- Cuando la verdad despierta - La sottile linea della verità, directed by Angelo Rizzo (2008)

=== TV ===
- Il giudice Mastrangelo, directed by Enrico Oldoini – Canale 5 (2005)
- Radio Sex, directed by Alessandro Baracco – Alice Home TV (2006)
- Tawanna Ray, directed by Alessandro Maccagni – Rai Fiction (2006)
- Linea di confine, directed by Massimo Donati e Alessandro Maccagni – TSI (2006)
- Camera Café, directed by Christoph Sancez – Italia 1 (2007) – role:Faggiano
- Il bene e il male, directed by Giorgio Serafini – Rai Uno (2009)
- Piloti, directed by Celeste Laudizio – Rai 2 (2009)
