= Palazzo delle Assicurazioni Generali, Turin =

Palazzo delle Assicurazioni Generali
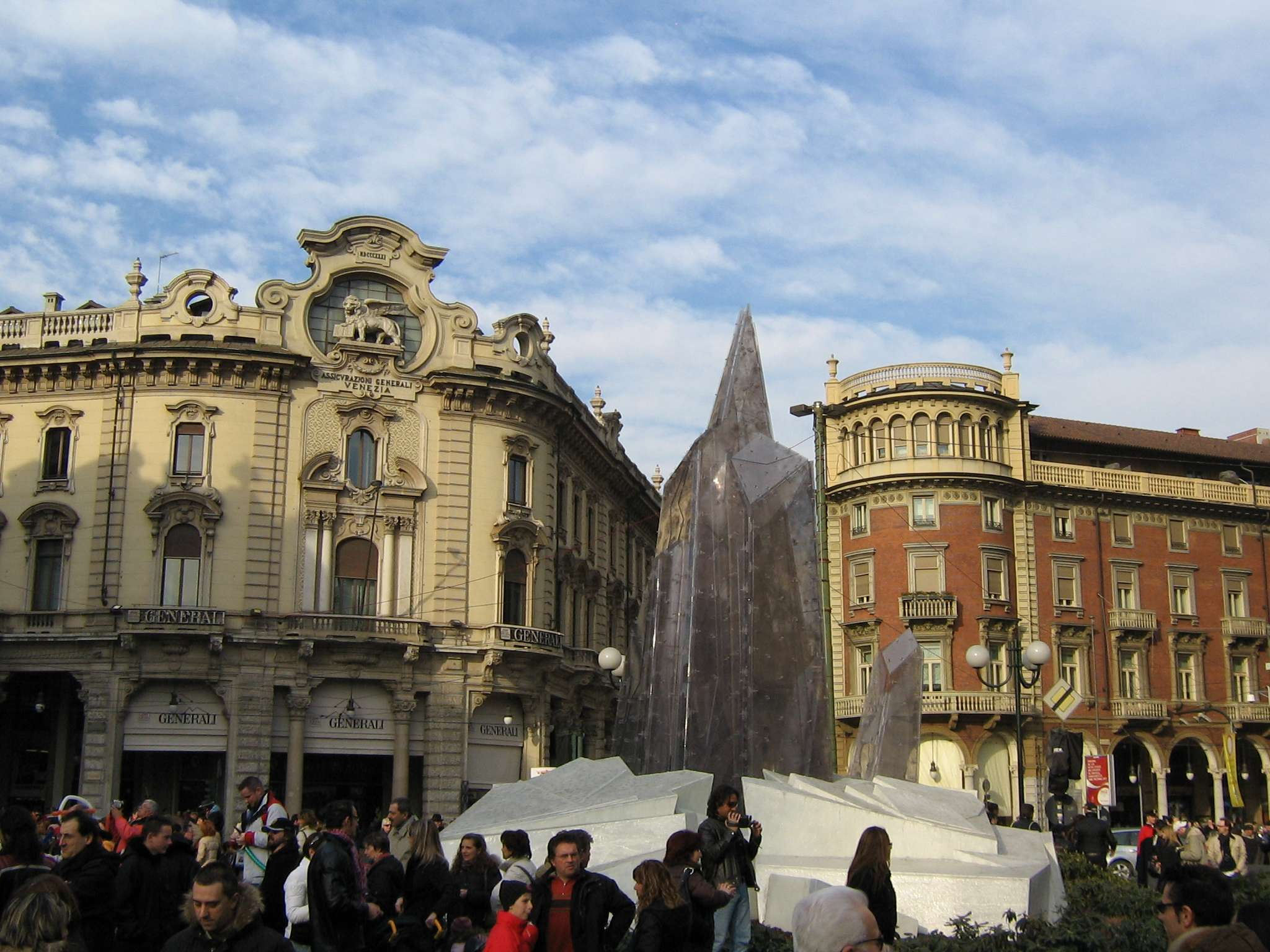
- The building, on the left, in 2006
- Click on the map for a fullscreen view

General information
- Location: Turin, Italy
- Coordinates: 45°04′13.58″N 7°40′40.31″E

The Palazzo delle Assicurazioni Generali is a historic building located in Turin, Italy.

== History ==
Vintage view

The building was commissioned to house the Turin headquarters of Assicurazioni Generali and was designed by architect Pietro Fenoglio. It was completed in 1911. Its construction formed part of the redevelopment of the new axis of Via Pietro Micca and scenographically defined the northern side of Piazza Solferino. The building was part of Assicurazioni Generali's real estate investment strategy, under which the company erected prestigious representative buildings in major Italian cities during the first decades of the 20th century.

== Description ==
The building features an eclectic style that combines elements of Baroque Revival, Art Nouveau, and Second Empire elements. The façade has a monumental appearance, with elaborate ornamentation and porticoes. At the top of the building stands a statue of a rampant lion, the symbol of Assicurazioni Generali.
