= Villa Zanelli =

Building in Savona, Italy

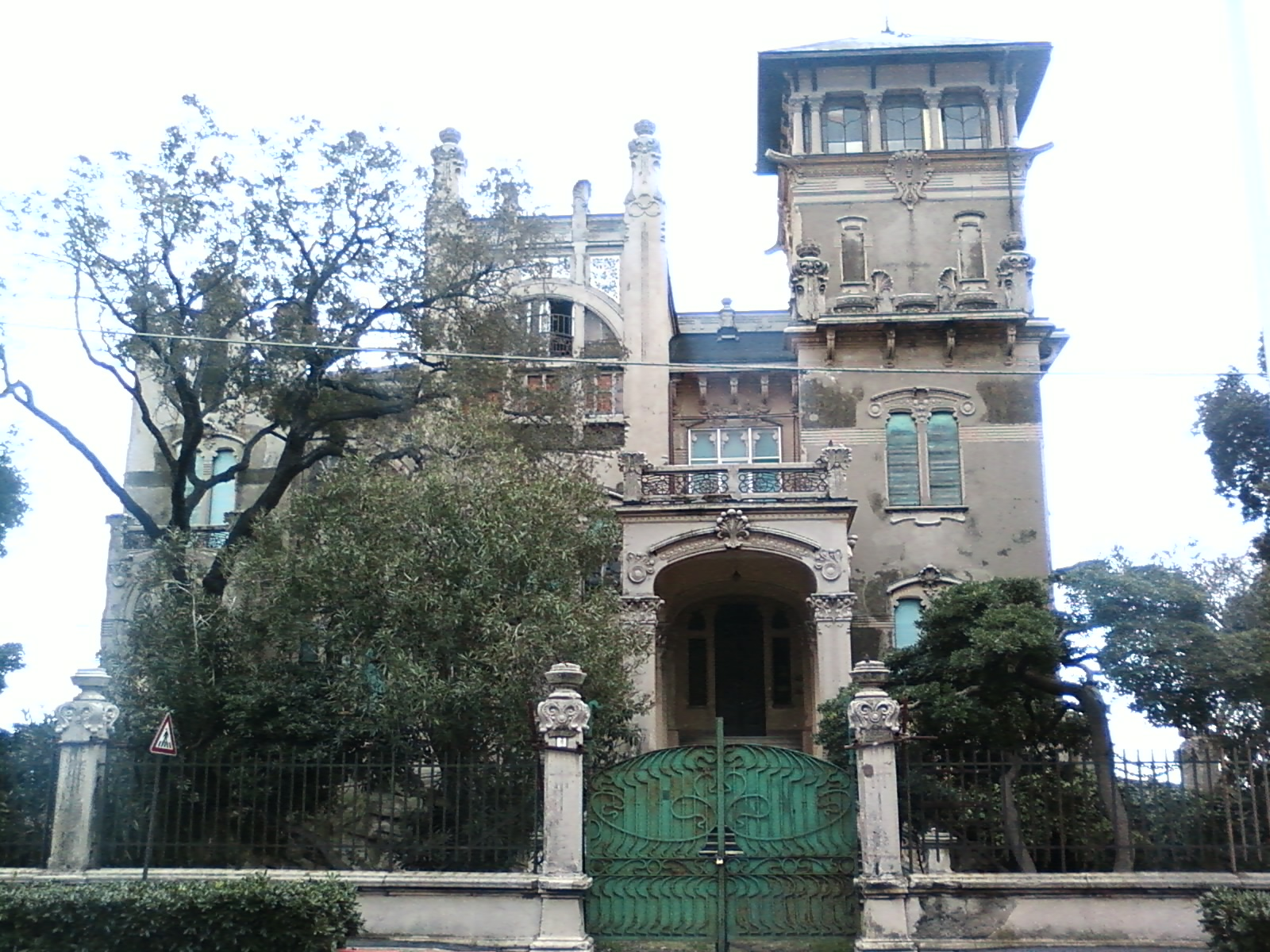
- Interactive map of Villa Zanelli

General information
- Type: Single-family house
- Architectural style: Liberty Style
- Location: Via Nizza, Savona, Liguria, Italy
- Coordinates: 44°17′34″N 8°27′24″E
- Completed: 1907

Design and construction
- Architects: Pietro Fenoglio; Gottardo Gussoni

Villa Zanelli is a historical building located in Savona, Liguria, Italy. The building is an example of the Liberty style of residential architecture (a variant of Art Nouveau most commonly found in Italy), and was completed in 1907 for the Zanelli family. Designed by the architect Gottardo Gussoni from Turin, it is close to the Tyrrhenian Sea beach in the Legino district of Savona.

== History and architecture ==
Located in a large garden by the sea, the house was built in 1907 by sea captain Nicolò Zanelli and owned by the Zanelli family until 1933, when it was sold to the municipality of Milan. The municipality converted the house into a camping site and an international colony. During phases of the Second World War, it was used as a hospital camp; traces of red crosses on the exterior walls are still visible.

An architectural analysis of the building credits the villa's design to both Gottardo Gussoni and Pietro Fenoglio, two of the most noteworthy exponents of the Italian Liberty style.

== Restoration ==
Numerous attempts to renovate and preserve the building have been made over the years by various regional and municipal administrations. The building was closed down in 1998 after a partial collapse, but in 2017, there was a major restoration of the property led by Dodi Moss. The restoration reinstated the original paths through the gardens. Additional alterations were made to accommodate increased foot traffic so that the villa could be opened to the public as a hotel and museum.
