= Pelts (Masters of Horror) =

- Masters of Horror episode
- DVD cover
- Episode no.: Season 2 Episode 6
- Directed by: Dario Argento
- Written by: Matt Venne
- Production code: 206
- Original air date: 1 December 2006

Guest appearances
- Link Baker; Meat Loaf; John Saxon; Emilio Salituro; Elise Lew; Ellen Ewusie

Episode chronology
| ← Previous "Pro-Life" | Next → "The Screwfly Solution" |

"Pelts" is the sixth episode of the second season of Masters of Horror, first aired on 1 December 2006. The director is Dario Argento, and it based on a short story by F. Paul Wilson. The film is a story about supernaturally beautiful raccoon pelts (called "pine lights") that cause anyone who seeks to profit by them to commit horrendous acts. Meat Loaf stars as fur trader Jake Feldman, who finds these beautiful raccoon pelts and makes a coat out of them as a gift for the beautiful dancer Shanna (Ellen Ewusie), to fulfill his fantasy of sex with her. As a result, people end up committing brutal murders and suicides appropriate to their positions in relation to the pelts whenever around them.

== Plot ==
Jake Feldman is a fur trader who desperately wants to have sex with a stripper named Shanna, who has no interest in him. One of his suppliers, Jeb Jameson and his son, go onto private land owned by an old woman known as "Mother Mater," to trap animals. They find each trap containing a raccoon, and Jameson schools his son on the proper way to kill them: crush their windpipes with a boot, and if they survive, crush their skulls with a baseball bat.

After processing, all of the raccoon pelts are perfect, and Jameson calls Feldman to arrange a sale. However, after Jameson goes to bed, his son Larry becomes mesmerized by the hanging furs, then pulls out the baseball bat and beats his father to death. Larry then opens a trap and sticks his face in, ripping it off. Feldman and his assistant arrive the next day to discover the beautiful pelts and both Jameson and his son dead. They steal the pelts and proceed to make a coat, which Feldman asks Shanna to model at the furriers expo. Inspired by his assistant, Feldman figures out where the Jamesons got the pelts by finding Jeb's map to Mother Mater's land, and visits Mother Mater to ask for a few raccoons to breed for fur.

Mother Mater states the reason she warns people off her land is because the raccoons have taken up guardianship of the lost city's ruins on them. She rages and chases him off, screaming that they have not yet had their say. The fur trimmer, Sergio, disembowels himself with his scissors after cutting the pelts. The seamstress, Sue Chin Yao, sews her nose, eyes and mouth shut after finishing the coat, then suffocates. Feldman is only concerned that the coat is finished, and takes it to Shanna's apartment. She is entranced by the coat and eager to model it, but Feldman says he is still considering other models. Shanna sees this as a request for sex, and agrees.

After they have sex, during which Shanna is wearing the fur coat, Feldman says he needs the bathroom and something sharp. Taking a knife with him, Feldman skins his own torso and creates a vest, bringing it out to Shanna. She panics and runs to the elevator, managing to take it down one floor before Feldman falls down the elevator shaft after her. She tries to escape, but Feldman grabs her leg and her hand is caught and crushed in the doors. Police find their bodies, and the film ends on one of the cops making a bloody footprint.

== Themes ==
The story can be seen as a dark satire on the fur industry; the means of the victims' deaths all being based on what the furriers do to the raccoons. This is unusual for a film by Dario Argento, since he normally avoids political overtones in his films.

== DVD ==
The film was released on DVD on 13 February 2007. It was the nineteenth episode to air and the fourteenth to be released on DVD.
