= Profondo Rosso (store) =

Horror film memorabilia museum in Rome

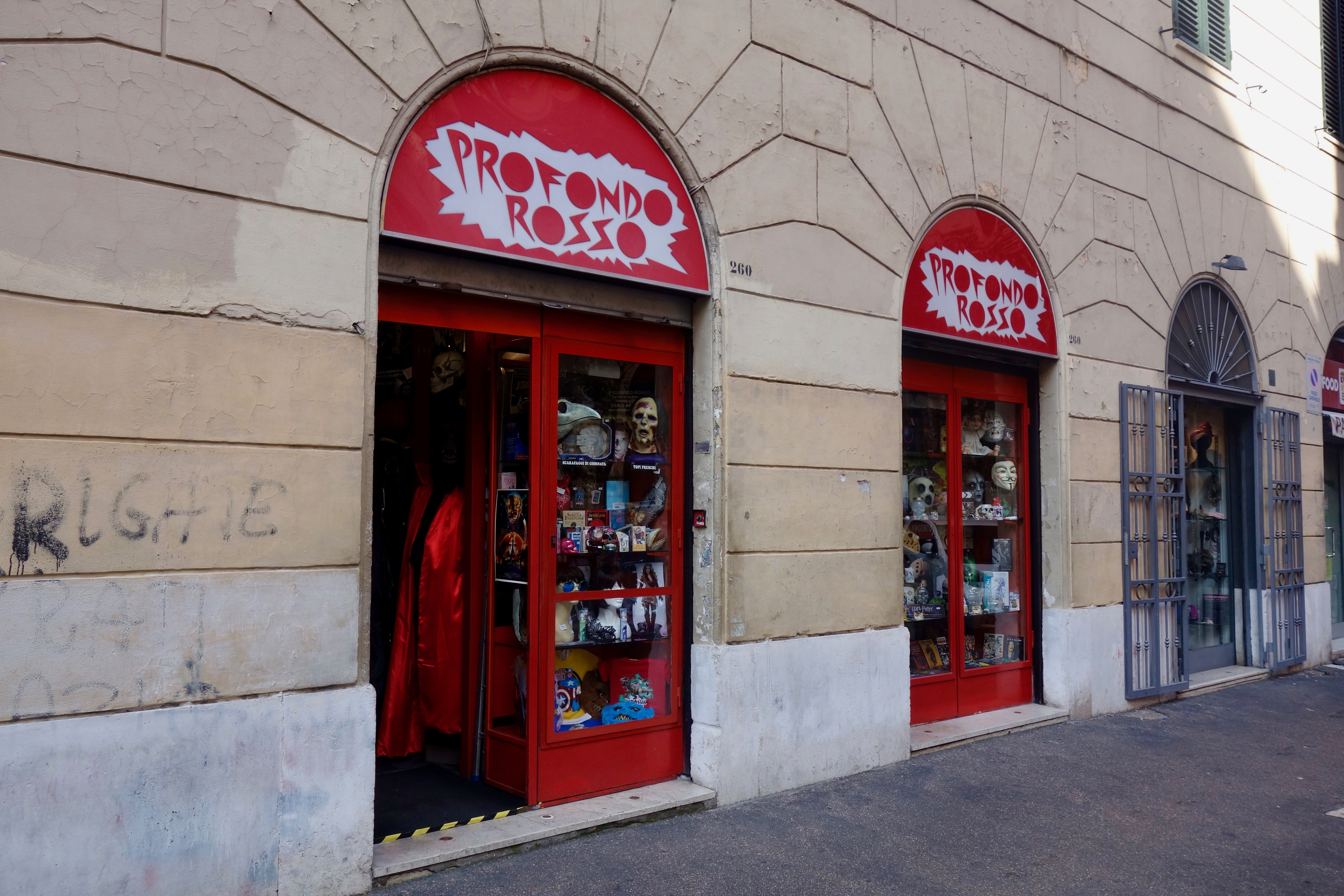
- Location: Rome, Italy
- Owner: Dario Argento
- Type: Horror film memorabilia, museum
- Event: Horror

Website
- profondorossostore.com

Profondo Rosso (Deep Red) is a horror film memorabilia store and museum located in Rome, Italy. The store is owned by film director Dario Argento and named after his film Deep Red. The basement of the store houses a museum of props from Argento's films.
