= Pietro Fenoglio =

Italian architect and engineer

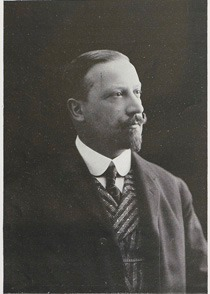
- Portrait of Pietro Fenoglio, 1865-1927.
- Born: 3 May 1865; Turin, Italy
- Died: 22 August 1927 (aged 62); Corio, Italy
- Occupation: Architect
- Buildings: Casa Fenoglio-Lafleur; Villa Scott; Villino Raby

Pietro Fenoglio (Turin, 3 May 1865 – Corio, 22 August 1927) was an Italian engineer and architect, then a bank manager, considered one of the most important pioneers of Art Nouveau in Italy.

Fenoglio quickly grasped the ascendancy of Art Nouveau as it appeared in Italy at the turn of the century as the "Stile Floreale" or "Stile Liberty" (Liberty style, named after the British department store Liberty & Company, a major purveyor of Art Nouveau furniture and decorative arts), during a period when Italian architects were searching for a national style of modern architecture. He took advantage of the very favorable economic climate to become one of the style's most fervent supporters in northern Italy before the First World War. Building little after 1912, Fenoglio parlayed his success as a designer into a diverse set of economic ventures, eventually landing him the directorship of a bank in 1915.

== Life and career ==
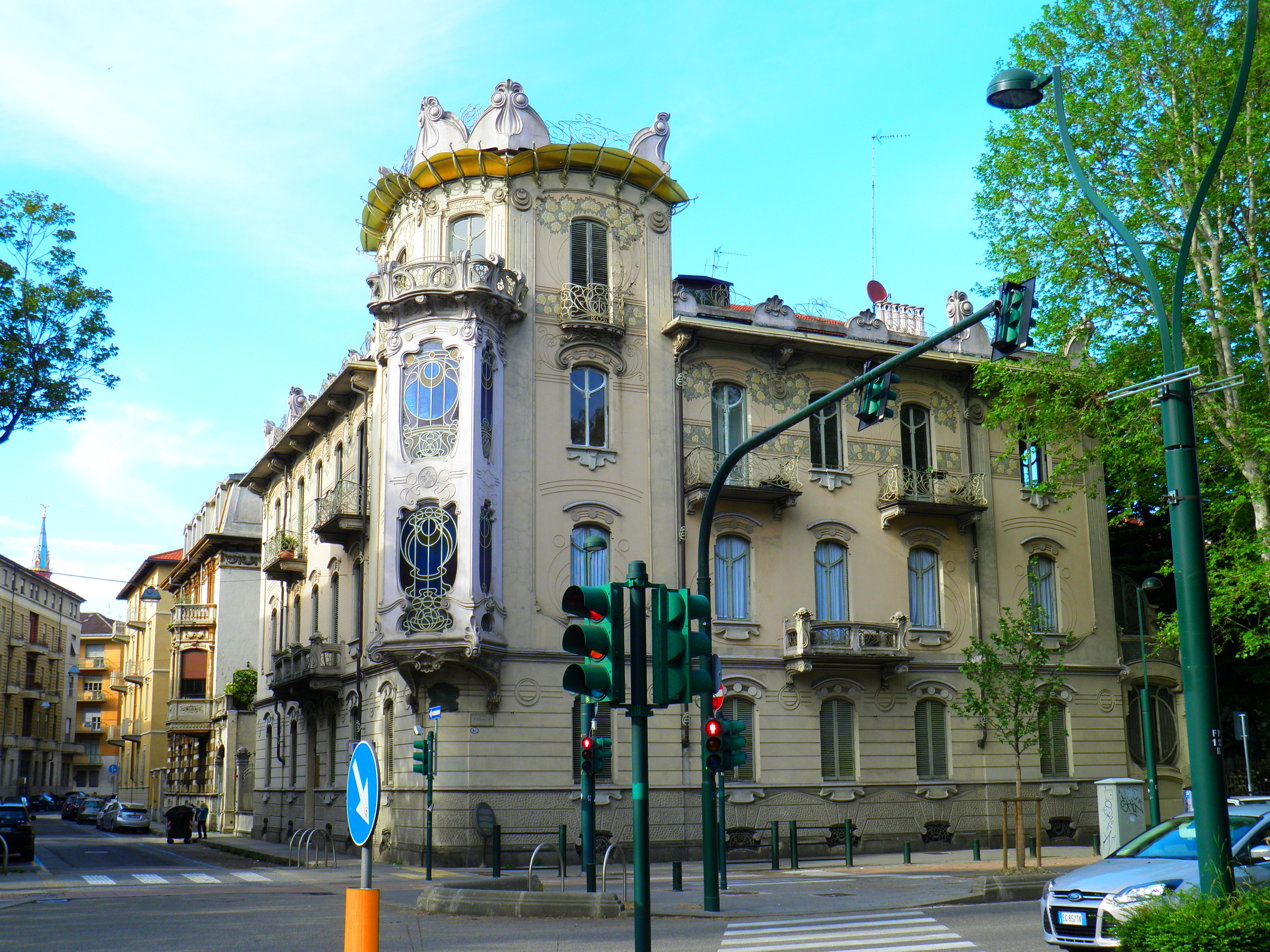
Built in 1902, Fenoglio's own house, the Casa Fenoglio-Lafleur, remains his most famous work.

Pietro Fenoglio was born in 1865 in Turin, four years after the modern unification of Italy into a single kingdom. His father Giovanni was an administrator, while his mother Giacinta (née Guillot) was the daughter of the former Préfect of Chambéry, who had moved to Turin after Chambéry had been annexed by France in the Treaty of Turin in 1860. After studying civil engineering under Carlo Ceppi at the Regia Scuola di Applicazione per gli Ingegneri di Torino (now the Politecnico di Torino), from which he graduated in 1886, he worked first for the firm of Brayda, Boggio and Reyend before forming his own firm. His first independent commissions in the 1890s exhibited a Gothic-revival style reminiscent of the historical building traditions of Piedmont.

Sensing the fashion of the time, however, his interest subsequently turned to Art Nouveau, and after 1900 he became the leading protagonist of the style in Turin. Commissions in a period of rapid economic expansion and prosperity were plentiful and Fenoglio became extremely prolific, establishing his studio at 60, Via XX Settembre, where he designed some of the major Italian examples of Art Nouveau. Over the course of thirteen years he designed and built over three hundred projects for villas and palaces, many of which were concentrated in the area centered on the Corso Francia. Fenoglio's work became increasingly recognizable by his strategic use of pastel colors, the ornament that alternates between floral subjects and circular geometric elements, and from the wide use of cement frameworks combined with the sometimes-daring decorative elegance of iron and glass.

Fenoglio was also one of the organizers of the 1902 and 1911 International Expositions in Turin, but he was also active in the publishing field, numbering among the founders and serving as one of the most important contributors to the magazine L'architettura italiana moderna. At the same time, the intense spate of construction activity meant that he also became part of the emerging Turin industrial and financial bourgeoisie, consolidating his influence in the construction sector. Fenoglio became vice-president of the well-known Impresa Porcheddu, of the Società Anonima Cementi del Monferrato, and a partner in the Accomandita Ceirano & Company, and managing director of the emerging Banca Commerciale Italiana.

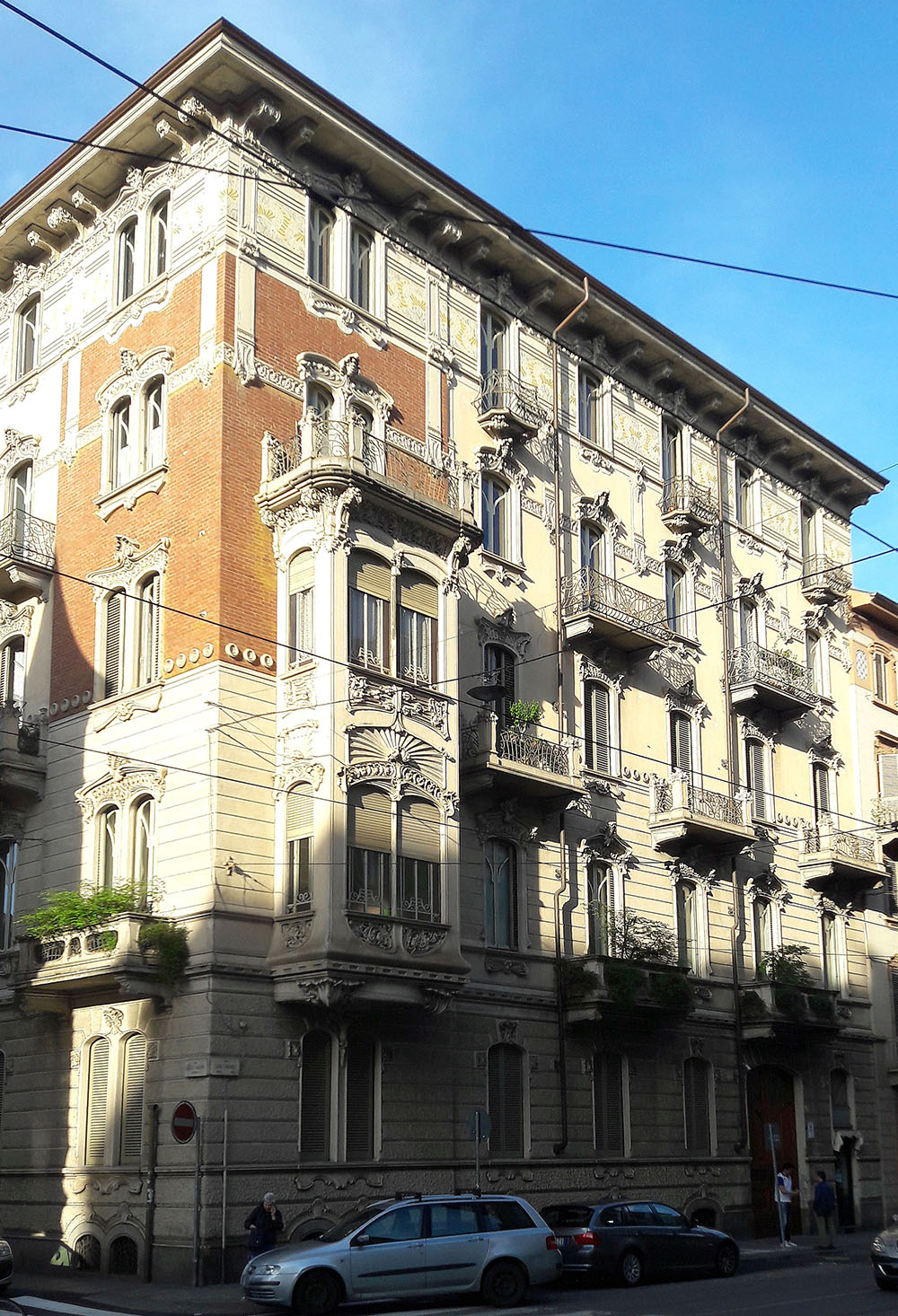
Casa Girardi, an apartment building on the Via Cibrario in Turin.

Among Fenoglio's best known works are the Villino Raby (1901); the famous Villa Scott (1902), a triumph of loggias, turrets, bay windows and oriels; and, above all, his own home, the Casa Fenoglio-Lafleur (1902); considered by many to be "the most significant example of liberty style in Italy."

Other buildings worthy of note that reproduce decorative elements deriving from the success of the Casa Fenoglio-Lafleur are the Casa Galateri, one of the many commissioned by the same client, recognizable for the remarkable oriel bay overlooking the Via Cibrario; and the no-less-remarkable Casa Rossi-Galateri on the Via Passalacqua. Fenoglio was especially known for the number of Art Nouveau apartment buildings during this period: Casa Rossi Galateri (1903), Casa Rey (1904), Casa Boffa/Costa (1904), Casa Macciotta (1904), Casa Balbis (1905), Casa Ina (1906), Casa Guelpa (1907), and the council houses of via Marco Polo (1904), realized in collaboration with the architects Vicary and Molli. Outside Piedmont, he designed the villa of Magno Magni in Canzo, near Como.

After 1904, his work as a designer expanded into the nascent world of Italian industry, which found Turin a favorable place to establish new companies. Among the best known commissions of Fenoglio's industrial architecture are the Conceria Fiorio (1900), the Stabilimento Boero (1905), the Fonderie Ballada (1906), the car factory of Officine Diatto (1907) and the large building of the first Italian brewery Bosio & Caratsch, with the attached manor house (1907). Thanks to his newly-acquired experience in the field of industrial plant design, Fenoglio was also entrusted with the vast project of the Leumann Village, the working-class neighborhood in nearby Collegno where, in addition to the Cotonificio Leumann, he built the houses and the school and the church of Santa Elisabetta, one of the handful of ecclesiastical structures in the world built in Art Nouveau. In the Monferrato area, together with the engineer Giovanni Antonio Porcheddu, he designed the first factory for the fiber cement company Eternit di Borgo Ronzone.

Fenoglio's activities were not confined to that of an esteemed professional designer. He was also politically active, holding positions as city councilman and consultant for the study of the new town plan that was completed in 1908. In 1912 he also joined the Board of Directors of the Banca Commerciale Italiana and in 1915, when the then-managing director Otto Joel was removed from his position due to his German origins, which were incompatible with the nationalistic climate following Italian entry into the First World War, he was replaced by Fenoglio himself along together with Giuseppe Toeplitz. In 1917 they were elected managing directors. In this capacity Fenoglio continued to promote quality architecture by actively participating in the bank's expansion and construction of branch offices, including eventually the construction of the new headquarters in Piazza Colonna in Rome, for which he appointed young Marcello Piacentini as director of works. Piacentini soon became one of the principal figures in the emergence of the rationalist architecture that characterized the next twenty years in Italy.

== Principal works ==
=== Turin ===
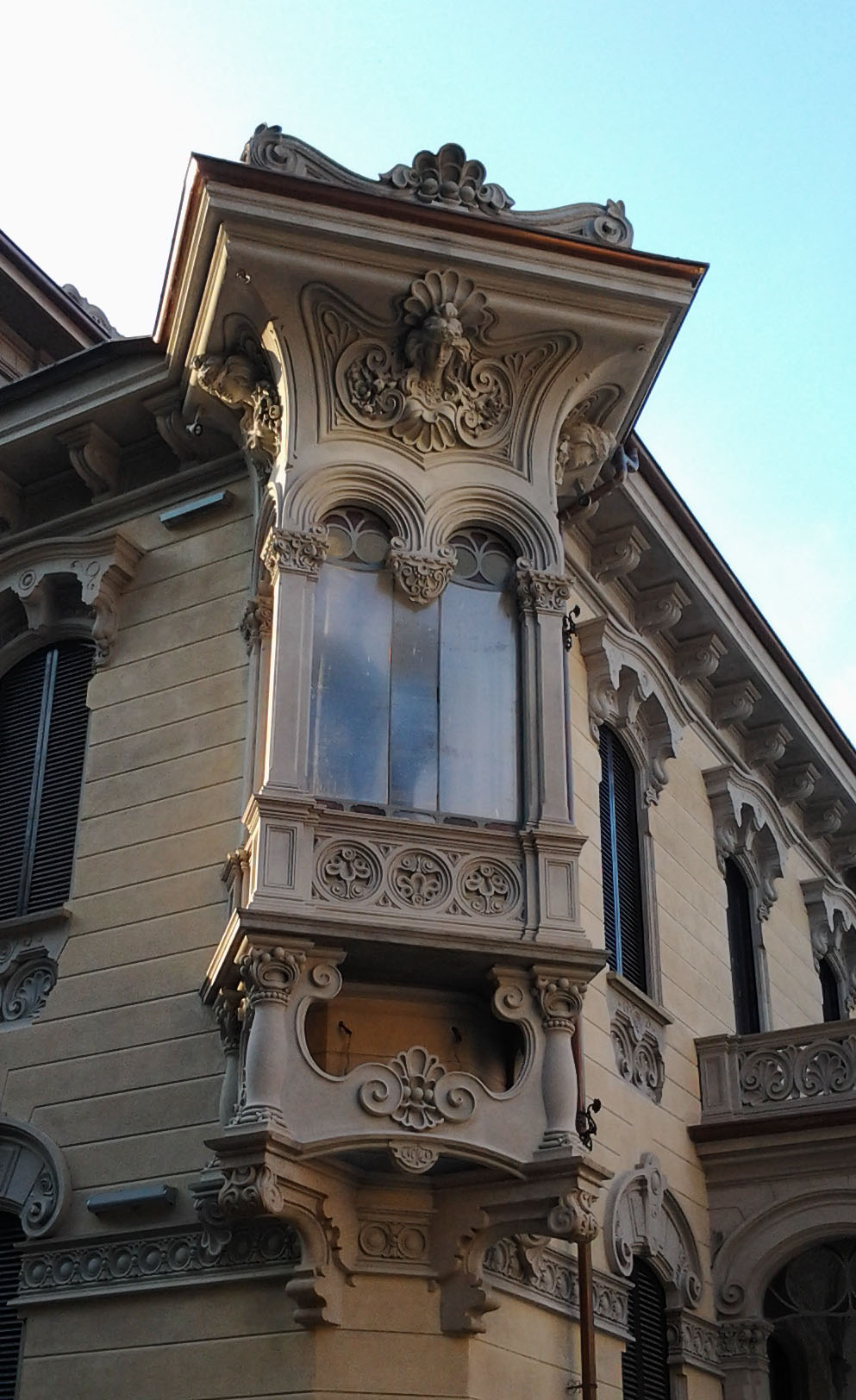
Oriel window of the Villino Raby in Turin (1901).

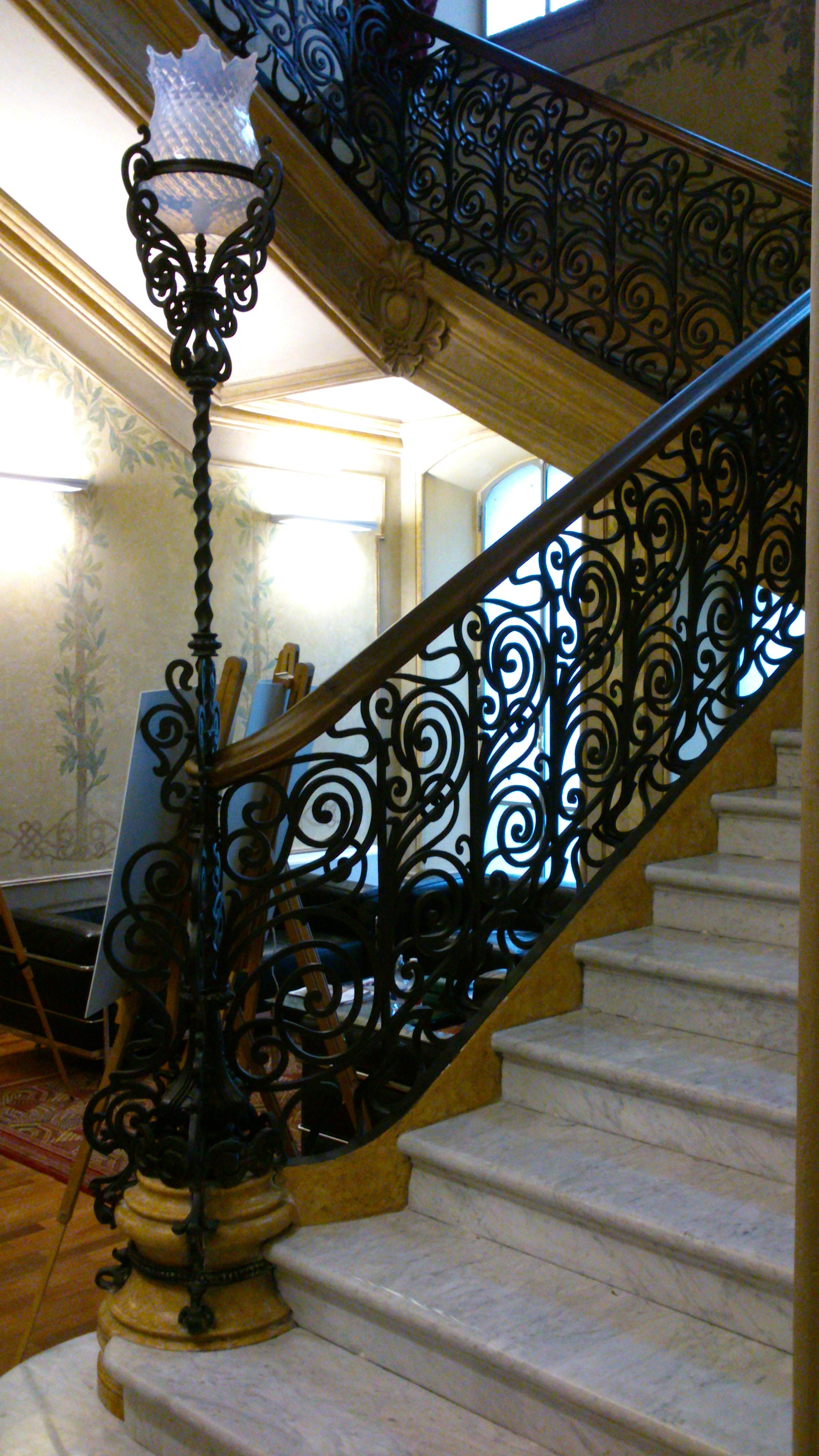
Staircase in the Villino Raby in Turin.

Center district

- Palazzina Rossi Galateri (1903), via Passalacqua 14
- Casa Balbis (1905), via Balbis 1
- Casa Florio (1907), via Monte di Pietà 26

Corso Francia area (Cit Turin e San Donato districts)

- Conceria Fiorio (1900), via Durandi, corner with via San Donato
- Villino Raby (1901), corso Francia 8
- Casa Fenoglio-Lafleur (1902), corso Francia 12, corner with Via Principi d'Acaja
- Casa Pecco (1902), via Cibrario 12
- Former Birrificio (brewery) Metzger (1903), via San Donato 68, corner with via Bogetto[
- Casa Macciotta (1904), corso Francia 32
- Casa Ina (1906), via Principi d'Acaja 20
- Casa Masino (1906), via Piffetti 7 bis
- Former Birrificio (brewery) Bosio & Caratsch and attached villa (1907), corso Regina Margherita 165, corner of via Bonzanigo
- Casa Padrini (1900), Via Cibrario 9

Crocetta district

- Casa Guelpa (1903), via Colli 2
- Casa Boffa-Costa (1905), via De Sonnaz 16
- Casa Besozzi (1896), via Papacino, corner with via Revel
- Casa Buzzani (1897), via Pastrengo 26
- Casa Debernardi (1903), via Colli 12, corner with via Vela
- Casa Boffa-Costa (1901), via Sacchi 28, corner with via Legnano
- Casa Boffa-Costa (1903), via Papacino 6, corner with via Revel
- Casa Bellia (1904), via Papacino 2, corner with corso Matteotti
- Casa Debernardi (1904), via Magenta 55, corner with via Morosini
- Casa Perino (1904), via San Secondo 70
- Casa Boffa-Costa-Magnani (1905), via De Sonnaz 16, corner with via Papacino
- Casa Rey (1906), corso G. Ferraris, 16/18
- Case popolari di via Marco Polo (1907)
- Via Sacchi 40 e 42 (1904)

San Paolo District

- Former stabilimento Società Anonima Diatto - A. Clément (1905), via Moretta 55

Vanchiglia and Vanchiglietta district

- Former Venchi candies and chocolate factory (1905), corso Regina Margherita 16, eventually repurposed as Opificio Miltare (MIlitary Factory)
- Società Automobili Elettriche Krieger car factory (1906), corso Regina Margherita 46, not existing anymore

Aurora and Borgo Rossini district

- Former Officine Meccaniche Michele Ansaldi (1899), via Luigi Damiano (they became after Officine Grandi Motori, a FIAT factory)
- Former (factory) Fabbrica nazionale Carte da Parati già Barone Ambrogio e figlio (1906-1908), corso Vigevano 33
- Former (foundry) Fonderie Ballada (1906), via Foggia 21
- Former Gilardini factory (tannerty enlargement 1904 - building for bombs production 1907), corso Giulio Cesare and via Aosta 8
- Former Ambrosio film studio (1907-1912), a project led by his colleague emg. Marinari, who took over the studio after Fenoglio turned his attention to finance
- Trabbia house (1901), corso Brescia 5
- Noro and Borione house (1909), corso Verona 20

Barriera di Milano district

- House for renting (1905-1907), via Pont 12
- House for renting (1907-1908), corso Venezia 4

Borgata Vittoria district

- Conceria Boero (1905), via del Ridotto 5[20]

Hills of Turin (Borgo Po district)

- Villa Scott (1902), corso G. Lanza 57

San Salvario and Nizza Millefonti districts

- Locati e Torretta Bodywork workshops (1905), via Nizza 154, not existing anymore
- Società Torinese Automobili RAPID car factory (1906), via Nizza 148, now hosts Unicredit Bank offices

=== Savona ===
- Villa Zanelli (1907), (with arch. Gottardo Gussoni)

== Bibliography ==
- Guido Montanari, "Pietro Fenoglio," in Dizionario biografico degli italiani, vol. 46. Rome: Istituto dell'Enciclopedia Italiana, 1996. URL consultato il 22 novembre 2011.
- Riccardo Nelva and Bruno Signorelli, Le opere di Pietro Fenoglio nel clima dell'art nouveau internazionale', Bari: Dedalo Libri, 1979.
- Clara Bertolini Cestari, Manuel Fernando Ramello, and Gian Mario Rossino, "Metodi e strumenti per la conoscenza di un patrimonio industriale: il caso di Morano Sul Po," in XIII Congresso TICCIH, 2006.
- Maurizio Ternavasio, Pietro Fenoglio vita di un architetto, Boves, Araba Fenice, 2014
