= Deep Red =

1975 film by Dario Argento

- Italian film poster
- Italian: Profondo rosso
- Directed by: Dario Argento
- Written by: Dario Argento; Bernardino Zapponi
- Produced by: Salvatore Argento
- Starring: David Hemmings; Daria Nicolodi; Gabriele Lavia; Macha Méril; Eros Pagni; Giuliana Calandra; Nicoletta Elmi; Glauco Mauri; Clara Calamai
- Cinematography: Luigi Kuveiller
- Edited by: Franco Fraticelli
- Music by: Giorgio Gaslini; Goblin
- Production companies: Rizzoli Film; Seda Spettacoli
- Distributed by: Cineriz
- Release date: 7 March 1975 (Italy)
- Running time: 126 minutes
- Country: Italy
- Language: Italian
- Box office: ₤3,709 billion (Italy) $629,903 (United States)

Deep Red (Italian: Profondo rosso), also known as The Hatchet Murders, is a 1975 Italian giallo film directed by Dario Argento, written by Argento and Bernardino Zapponi, and starring David Hemmings, Daria Nicolodi, Gabriele Lavia, Macha Méril, and Clara Calamai. It follows a pianist (Hemmings) who investigates a series of murders performed by a mysterious figure wearing black leather gloves. The film's score was composed and performed by Goblin, the first in a long-running collaboration with Argento.

The film was released during the height of the "giallo craze" of Italian popular cinema, and was a critical and commercial success. Retrospective reviews have been equally positive, and Deep Red is considered one of the genre's definitive entries, as well as one of Argento's finest works.

== Plot ==
In 1956, during Christmas at a family home, an unseen figure stabs another to death. A bloody knife falls to the floor at the feet of a child.

Twenty years later, Professor Giordani chairs a parapsychology conference featuring psychic medium Helga Ulmann. Helga is suddenly overwhelmed by the "twisted, perverted, murderous" thoughts of someone in the audience. Speaking later with Giordani, Helga says she believes she can identify this person, unaware that someone is listening from the shadows.

Later that night, a black-gloved figure invades Helga's apartment and kills her with a meat cleaver. English jazz pianist Marcus Daly sees the murder from the window as he passes by and rushes to her apartment, finding her mutilated corpse. After the police arrive, Marcus thinks one of the apartment's paintings has disappeared, but he cannot pinpoint what exactly is missing.

The media identifies Marcus as the eyewitness and shows reporter Gianna Brezzi's photo of him. The next morning, Marcus visits the home of his heavy-drinking friend, Carlo, but only finds Carlo's eccentric mother Martha, who seems interested in Marcus. That night, the killer plays a recording of a child's song outside Marcus's door; he manages to lock the door before the person can enter, but he hears the gruff whisper, "I'll kill you sooner or later." Feeling guilty for endangering him by taking his photo, Gianna begins helping Marcus investigate.

Marcus tells Giordani, whom he met at Helga's funeral, about the encounter. Giordani, noting that Helga also mentioned hearing child's song during her vision, recalls a book of modern folklore describing a local haunted house where a child's song is sometimes heard. Marcus finds the folklore book at the library. He rips out a picture of the house and plans to learn more by visiting the book's author, Amanda Righetti. However, the killer, who has been watching Marcus, attacks Amanda and drowns her in scalding water before Marcus arrives.

Marcus uses the photo from the book to find the huge, abandoned house. Under sheetrock he uncovers a disturbing mural: a child holding a bloody knife over a dead body. After he leaves, a loose chunk of sheetrock falls away, revealing another figure in the drawing. Meanwhile, Giordani, who has been assisting Marcus's investigation, is murdered by the killer after being distracted by a large mechanized doll.

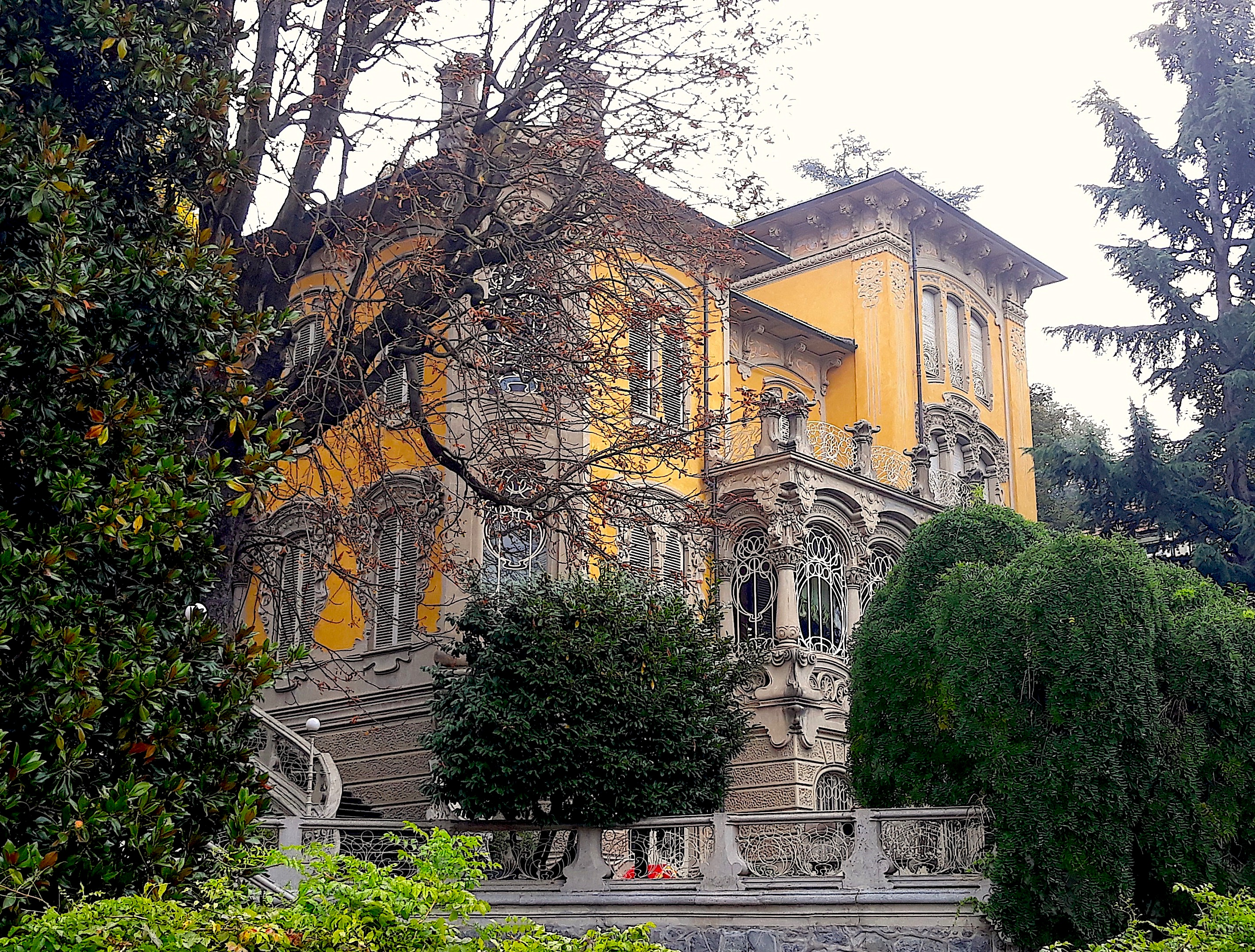
Villa Scott, "The House of the Screaming Child" in the film

Continuing his search of the abandoned house, Marcus finds a walled-off room. In the middle of the dusty floor sits a desiccated corpse. Someone knocks Marcus unconscious as he backs away in horror. He awakens outside the house, which is burning. Gianna appears, explaining that she got his message about investigating the house and arrived in time to save him. Marcus and Gianna wait for the police in the house of the caretaker, whose daughter has drawn a picture identical to the hidden mural Marcus found in the house. She tells him she saw the picture in the archives of the local school.

Marcus and Gianna immediately go to the school and find the picture, which proves to be the childhood work of Marcus's friend Carlo. Gianna leaves to call the police and encounters Carlo, who stabs her. Pursued by Marcus and the police, Carlo runs into the dark street and is hit by a garbage truck, which snags his clothing and drags him until an oncoming car runs over his head. Gianna is hospitalized and survives the stabbing.

Marcus remembers that on the night of Helga's murder he met an utterly intoxicated Carlo coming from a different direction than the killing, meaning that Carlo couldn't have been the killer. Returning to Helga's apartment, Marcus has an epiphany: the supposed painting he saw on the night of the murder, and was subsequently unable to find, was really the killer's reflection in a mirror. As Marcus realizes he saw Martha, Carlo's mother, she appears behind him with a meat cleaver. Martha explains that after her husband said he would re-commit her to an insane asylum, she murdered him in front of the young Carlo. She walled off the room containing his body. Carlo, scarred psychologically, compulsively drew the scene as a youth and as an adult tried to repress the memory of the homicide with alcohol: he attacked Marcus and Gianna to protect his murderous mother from their investigation.

Martha attacks Marcus and wounds him with the cleaver. After Martha's necklace tangles in the bars of the building's elevator, Marcus sends the elevator down, decapitating her.

== Cast ==
- David Hemmings as Marcus Daly
- Daria Nicolodi as Gianna Brezzi
- Gabriele Lavia as Carlo Manganiello
  - Jacopo Mariani as Young Carlo Manganiello
- Macha Méril as Helga Ulmann
- Eros Pagni as Police Superintendent Calcabrini
- Giuliana Calandra as Amanda Righetti
- Clara Calamai as Martha Manganiello
- Piero Mazzinghi as Bardi
- Glauco Mauri as Professor Giordani
- Liana Del Balzo as Elvira
- Geraldine Hooper as Massimo Ricci
- Nicoletta Elmi as Olga
- Furio Meniconi as Rodi
- Fulvio Mingozzi as Agent Mingozzi

== Background ==
Deep Red represented Argento's return to the horror genre after an attempted breakaway with the historical dramedy The Five Days (1974). It was his last giallo film before Tenebre (1982), which was produced years after the genre's heyday.

The film marked Argento's first collaboration with actress Daria Nicolodi, with whom he subsequently began a relationship, and the progressive rock band Goblin. Nicolodi later co-wrote the screenplay for Argento's Suspiria (1977). The soundtrack combined compositions by Giorgio Gaslini with music by Goblin. In a 2023 interview with Rolling Stone Italia, keyboardist Claudio Simonetti recalled that the band was initially recruited to perform Gaslini's compositions before being asked to contribute additional music following Gaslini's departure from the project.

== Production ==
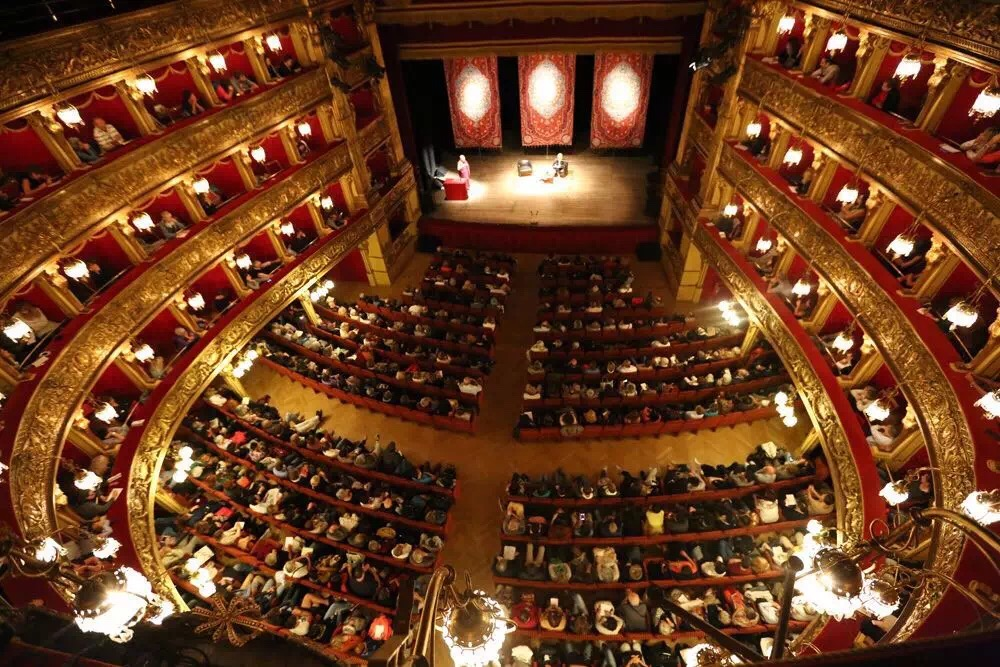
The Teatro Carignano, where the film's opening scene takes place

The film was shot mainly on-location in Turin in sixteen weeks. Additional scenes were shot in Rome and Perugia. Argento chose Turin because at the time there were more practising Satanists there than in any other European city, excluding Lyon. He had previously shot parts of The Cat o' Nine Tails and Four Flies on Grey Velvet (both 1971) in the city. Filming locations included Piazza C.L.N., Santa Costanza Church and Teatro Carignano. Argento would later revisit Carignano 25 years later in Sleepless (2001). The "House of the Screaming Child" was Villa Scott, a historical villa owned at the time by a convent of nuns and operated as a boarding school.

Argento's original working title for the film was La Tigre dei Denti a Sciabola (The Sabre-Toothed Tiger), matching the "animal" motif of his previous gialli.

The screenplay was co-written by Dario Argento and Bernardino Zapponi. The idea of a psychic medium who detects the thoughts of a murderer originated from an earlier draft of Four Flies on Grey Velvet (1971). The screenplay eventually reached 321 pages, requiring substantial reductions during pre-production. Zapponi subsequently attributed the more realistic elements of the story to his own contributions, while Argento developed many of its more surreal and disturbing aspects.

The close-up shots of the killer's black-gloved hands were performed by Argento himself, a technique he employed in several of his other thrillers. The film's mechanical and prosthetic effects were created by Carlo Rambaldi, including an animated doll, an artificial mummified corpse and replica body parts used in the murder sequences.

As was common in Italian filmmaking during the period, the dialogue was dubbed in post-production rather than recorded synchronously during filming. Both Italian and English soundtracks were prepared, with David Hemmings providing his own voice for the English-language version.

== Release ==
Deep Red was released in Milan and Rome in Italy on 7 March 1975. In the United States, the film first premiered in New York City on 9 June 1976 and saw a wide theatrical release on 11 June 1976 by the defunct US independent film distributor Howard Mahler Films. The film was once again re-released and re-titled in the US on 18 January 1980, as The Hatchet Murders,. Unlike Argento's previous features, the film did not have a wide cinema release in the UK. The 1982 video release on Fletcher Video was uncertificated. The first formal submission to the BBFC for classification was made by Redemption Films for their VHS release in 1993. It was passed 18 with 11s of cuts (to 'fighting' dogs), and reframing (of a lizard apparently impaled alive on a blade) on 03/12/1993 (all cuts were subsequently waived, see below).

=== Critical reception ===
The film holds a 94% approval rating on review aggregation website Rotten Tomatoes, based on 31 reviews with an average rating of 8.4/10. The site's consensus reads: "The kinetic camerawork and brutal over-the-top gore that made Dario Argento famous is on full display, but the addition of a compelling, complex story makes Deep Red a masterpiece." On Metacritic, the film has a weighted average score of 89 out of 100 based on 7 critic reviews, indicating "universal acclaim". One negative review upon the film's original American release came from Vincent Canby in The New York Times, who referred to the film as a "bucket of ax-murder-movie cliches" and called Dario Argento "a director of incomparable incompetence."

From retrospective reviews, Kim Newman wrote in the Monthly Film Bulletin that Deep Red was a transitional work for Argento between his earlier whodunit plots and the more supernatural themed films. Newman concluded that Deep Red is "nothing if not an elaborate mechanism, with the camera crawling among objets trouvés" and "what sets Argento apart from imitators like Lucio Fulci is his combination of genuine pain (the murders are as nasty as one could wish, but the camera flinches where Fulci's would linger) and self-mocking humour" Total Film gave the film four stars out of five, noting that Argento's films "can be an acquired taste; it's necessary to attune yourself with the horror director's style in order to get the most from his movies." The review stated that the film "presents some striking visual compositions that raise it above the level of the usual subgenre offerings." and that the film was "A great introduction to Dario Argento's evolving style of horror". The A.V. Club wrote, "Operating under the principle that a moving camera is always better than a static one – and not above throwing in a terrifying evil doll – Deep Red showcases the technical bravado and loopy shock tactics that made Argento famous." AllMovie compared the film to other in Argento's work, noting that the film script was "significantly stronger and the actors much better" AllMovie noted that "Each of the murders is perfectly choreographed with particular praise going to Glauco Mauri's killing" and that "The final reel wraps the film up in a thrilling manner and features two extremely graphic deaths that leave the viewer stunned as the credits roll"

Quentin Tarantino described being "rattled" by the movie as a teenager, and picked it as one of his favorite horror movies.

=== Home media ===
Deep Red has received numerous home-video releases presenting different versions of the film. In the United States, Anchor Bay Entertainment released the longer version on DVD by May 2000, with Italian and English audio options, a widescreen presentation and a retrospective interview with director Dario Argento. Because portions of the original English-language soundtrack were unavailable, some dialogue sequences were presented in Italian with English subtitles. Blue Underground released the film on Blu-ray in the United States on 17 May 2011, featuring both the original Italian version and the shorter American theatrical version through seamless branching. The edition also restored the complete moving end-credit sequence, which had been truncated on earlier American DVD editions. Arrow Video released a limited-edition Blu-ray on 10 April 2018, featuring both versions of the film and archival interviews with Dario Argento, Daria Nicolodi and Claudio Simonetti. The company's 4K Ultra HD edition followed on 26 October 2021.

In the United Kingdom, the British Board of Film Classification required alterations to the film's 1993 video submitted by Redemption Films. Platinum Media Corporation released a version in January 2005, and Arrow Film releasing a version on 13 October 2010. The latter was classified by the BBFC as running the uncut 126 minutes. Arrow Video released a limited-edition restored Blu-ray on 25 January 2016. On 25 October 2021, Arrow released a 4K Ultra HD Blu-ray edition containing new restorations of the original 127-minute Italian version and the 105-minute export version, both sourced from the original camera negative and presented in Dolby Vision.

In France, Wild Side Video released a two-disc collector's edition of Les Frissons de l'angoisse in August 2004. The set featured the complete film, a documentary of approximately two hours featuring Argento and his collaborators, and an 80-page booklet written by French film critic Jean-Baptiste Thoret. Wild Side Video subsequently released a Blu-ray edition on 5 December 2012, containing both the complete Italian version and the shorter international export version, with French, English and Italian audio options for the longer cut. The edition also included two documentaries, Il mio cinema and Profondo Giallo, featuring interviews with Argento and other filmmakers and collaborators.

Arrow Films subsequently issued restored Blu-ray editions, including a limited edition in 2016 and a further release in 2018 featuring both versions and archival interviews with Argento, Daria Nicolodi and Claudio Simonetti. In October 2021, Arrow released a 4K Ultra HD edition containing new restorations of the original 127-minute Italian version and the 105-minute export version, both sourced from the original camera negative and presented in Dolby Vision.

In Japan, TC Entertainment released a 45th-anniversary 4K edition in December 2023 under the Japanese title Suspiria Part 2. The four-disc collector's edition included both the 126-minute complete version and the 105-minute theatrical version, newly restored in 4K from the original camera negative. A separate Blu-ray disc featured an HD transfer of the original 1978 Japanese theatrical release with the original Japanese subtitles left intact. The edition also included Japanese television and home-video dubbing tracks and approximately 280 minutes of supplementary material, including interviews and documentaries.

In Italy, Eagle Pictures and Mustang Entertainment released the film on 4K Ultra HD Blu-ray for the first time in 2025, coinciding with its 50th anniversary. The three-disc edition contained a 4K UHD disc, a standard Blu-ray and a DVD devoted to supplementary material. Its extras included an interview with Argento conducted by film critic Gianni Canova, an archival featurette featuring Argento and co-writer Bernardino Zapponi, and footage of Claudio Simonetti performing the film's music at Milan's Sforza Castle in July 2025.

== Soundtrack ==
Argento originally contacted jazz pianist and composer Giorgio Gaslini to score the film; however, he was unhappy with Gaslini's output. After failing to get Pink Floyd to replace Gaslini, Argento turned back to Italy and found Goblin, a local progressive rock band. Their leader Claudio Simonetti impressed Argento by producing two compositions within just one night. Argento signed them immediately, and they ended up composing most of the film's musical score (three Gaslini compositions were retained in the final version). Subsequently, Goblin composed music for several other films by Dario Argento.

The soundtrack was made available for the first time ever on vinyl after Waxwork Records released the complete score by Goblin on a triple LP. In addition to Goblin's music, the LP also included instrumental and alternate tracks by Gaslini.

== Alternate versions ==
Two principal versions of Deep Red have circulated internationally. The original Italian version runs approximately 127 minutes, while the shorter export version runs approximately 105 minutes. The export version removes much of the dialogue, humour and romantic interaction between the characters portrayed by David Hemmings and Daria Nicolodi, producing a faster-paced narrative while retaining the central murder mystery. The longer version contains sequences for which no English-language dialogue recording is available, resulting in some home-video editions switching to Italian audio with English subtitles. Both versions were restored in 4K by Arrow Films in 2021.

== Legacy ==
Two key sequences in this film influenced directors of later horror movies: the lead-up to the famous exploding head scene in David Cronenberg's Scanners is modeled after the parapsychology discussion at the beginning of Deep Red, and Rick Rosenthal's Halloween II contains a scalding water death inspired by the death of Giuliana Calandra's character Amanda Righetti here.

Director James Wan has cited the works of Dario Argento as an influence for the Saw horror series, and Billy the Puppet, the avatar of the series' villain, is visually similar to the mechanical doll that menaces Giordani in Deep Red.

Director Lucile Hadžihalilović said that the empty and dilapidated palazzo in Deep Red was a big influence in creating the environment in her film The Ice Tower (2025).

Profondo Rosso, a Rome horror memorabilia store owned and operated by Argento and Luigi Cozzi, is named after the film.

=== Unproduced remake ===
In 2010, George A. Romero was contacted by Claudio Argento to direct a 3D remake of Deep Red, which Claudio said would also involve Dario. Romero showed some interest in the film; however, after contacting Dario – who said he knew nothing about the remake – Romero declined Claudio's offer.

=== Stage adaptation ===
In 2007, Argento directed a musical theatre adaptation of Deep Red with music by Claudio Simonetti. The role of Marcus was played by Michel Altieri.

== See also ==
- Profondo Rosso (store)
