= Dario Argento =

Italian film director and screenwriter

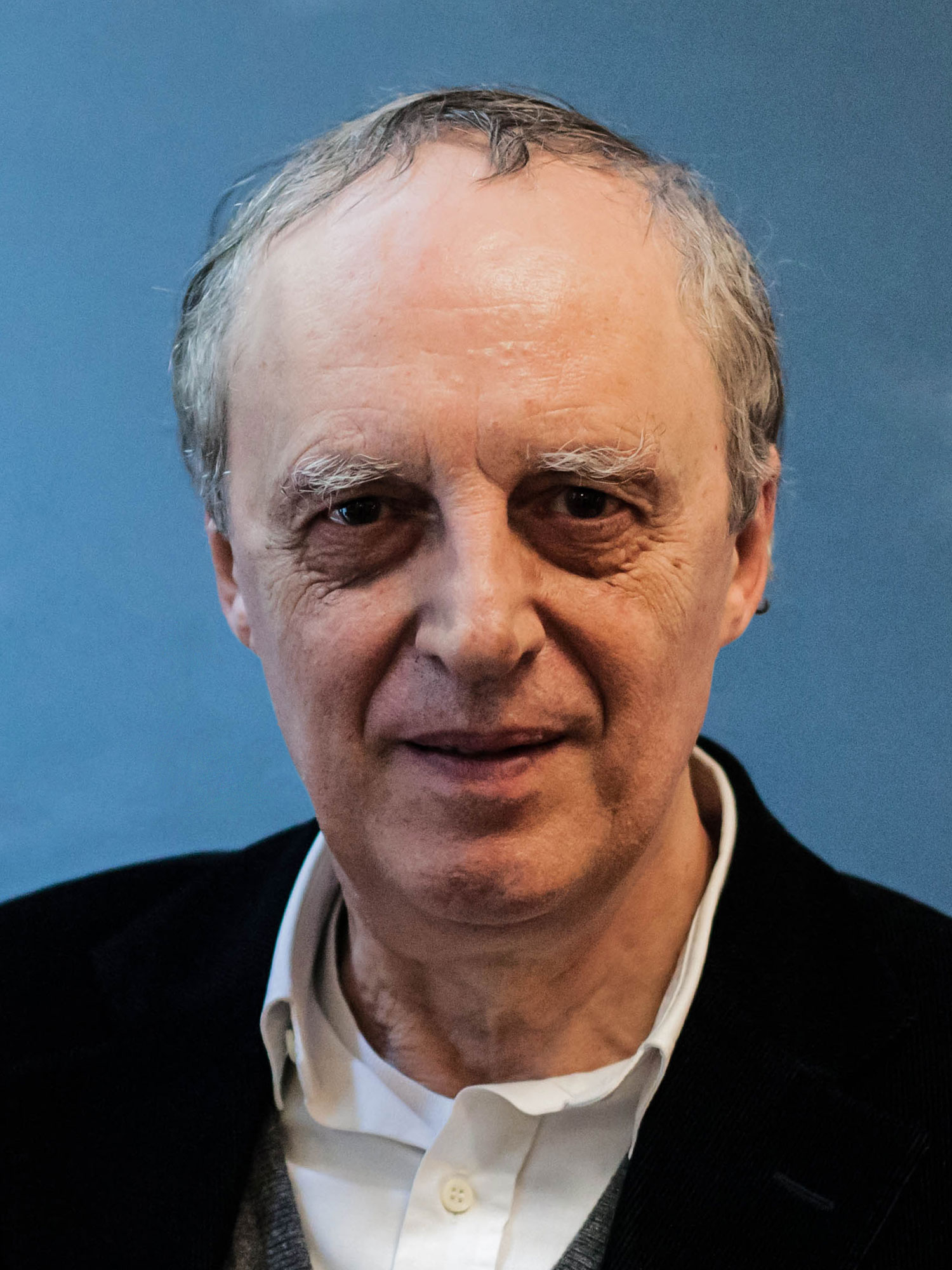
- Argento in 2014
- Born: 7 September 1940 (age 86); Rome, Kingdom of Italy
- Other name: Sirio Bernadotte
- Occupations: Film director; screenwriter; film producer; film editor; composer; actor
- Style: Horror; giallo
- Spouse: Marisa Casale (m. 1968; div. 1972)
- Partner: Daria Nicolodi (1974–1985)
- Children: 2, including Asia
- Relatives: Claudio Argento (brother)

Signature
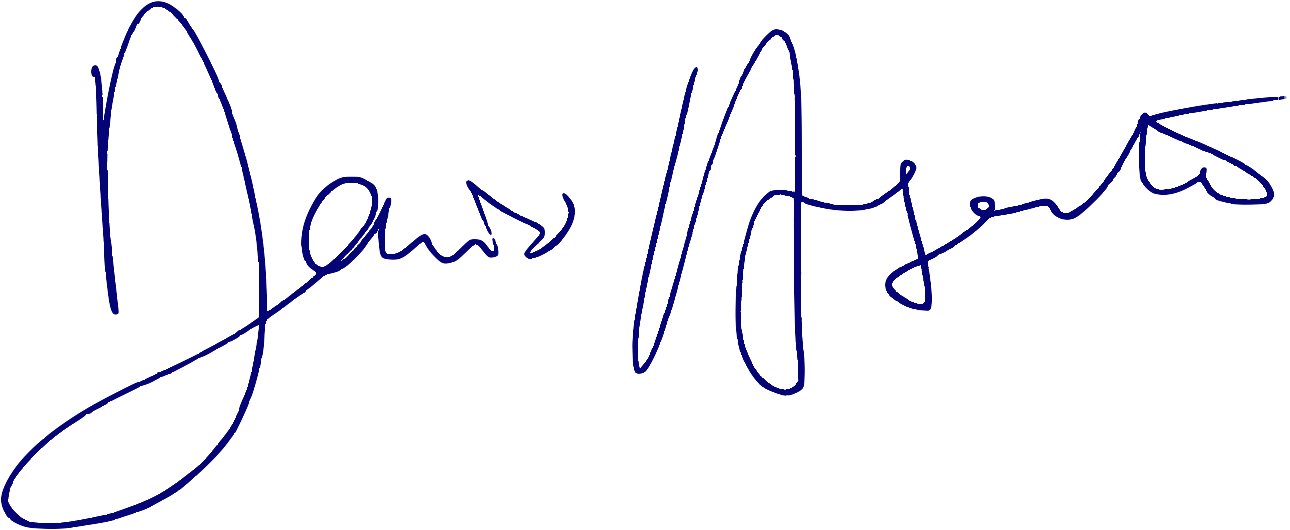

Dario Argento (Italian: [ˈdaːrjo arˈdʒɛnto]; born 7 September 1940) is an Italian filmmaker. His influential work in the horror and giallo genres during the 1970s and 1980s has led him to being referred to as the "Master of the Thrill" and the "Master of Horror".

His films as director include his "Animal Trilogy", consisting of The Bird with the Crystal Plumage (1970), The Cat o' Nine Tails (1971) and Four Flies on Grey Velvet (1971); his "Three Mothers" trilogy, consisting of Suspiria (1977), Inferno (1980) and The Mother of Tears (2007); and his stand-alone films Deep Red (1975), Tenebrae (1982), Phenomena (1985) and Opera (1987). He also co-wrote the screenplay for Sergio Leone's Once Upon a Time in the West (1968) and co-produced George A. Romero's Dawn of the Dead (1978), as well as editing and scoring the European version of the latter film.

== Early life ==
Argento was born in Rome in 1940. His father, Salvatore Argento (1914–87), was a film producer originally from Sicily. His mother, Elda (née Luxardo, 1915–2013), was a Brazilian fashion photographer of Italian descent.

Argento attended a Catholic secondary school, but dropped out after two years and moved to Paris, where he lived for a year while working as a dishwasher. Upon returning to Italy in 1957, the 16-year-old Argento began working as a film critic, writing for magazines and as a columnist for the Rome-based newspaper Paese Sera, where he developed a reputation for promoting genre films.

== Career ==
=== 1960s ===
While still working at Paese Sera, Argento also began writing screenplays. His first produced script was 1966's Pardon, Are You For or Against?, a comedy directed by and starring Alberto Sordi. One of his most notable works during this period was as the story writer (with Bernardo Bertolucci) of Sergio Leone's Spaghetti Western epic Once Upon a Time in the West (1968).

His first directing contribution was as an uncredited assistant director on the 1969 Western The Five Man Army, directed by American filmmaker Don Taylor. That same year he founded a production company, SEDA Spettacoli, with his father Salvatore.

=== 1970s ===
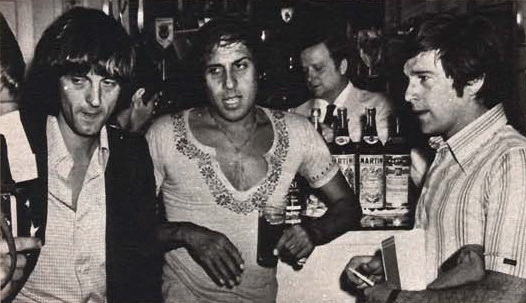
Dario Argento, Adriano Celentano and Enzo Cerusico in a pause during the shooting of The Five Days, 1973

Argento began work on his directorial debut, the giallo film The Bird with the Crystal Plumage (L'uccello dalle piume di cristallo, 1970), which was a major hit in Italy. Argento continued to concentrate largely on the giallo genre, directing two more successful thrillers, The Cat o' Nine Tails (Il gatto a nove code, 1971) and Four Flies on Grey Velvet (4 mosche di velluto grigio, 1972). Along with The Bird with the Crystal Plumage, these three films are frequently referred to as Argento's "Animal Trilogy". The director then turned his attention away from giallo movies, filming two Italian TV dramas and a period comedy, The Five Days (Le cinque giornate, 1973). Argento returned to thrillers with Deep Red (1975), frequently cited by many critics as the best giallo ever made. The film made Argento known internationally and inspired other directors to work in the genre. John Carpenter has frequently referred to the influence Argento's early work had on Halloween (1978).

Argento's next film was Suspiria (1977), a supernatural horror. Argento planned for Suspiria to be the first of a trilogy about "The Three Mothers", three ancient witches residing in three different modern cities. The second film of the trilogy was 1980's Inferno. The Mother of Tears (2007) concluded the trilogy.

In 1978, Argento collaborated with George A. Romero on Dawn of the Dead, earning a producer credit and also providing soundtrack work for the zombie film. Argento oversaw the European release of the film, where it was titled Zombi, which was much shorter and featured more of the score written and performed by Goblin.

=== 1980s ===
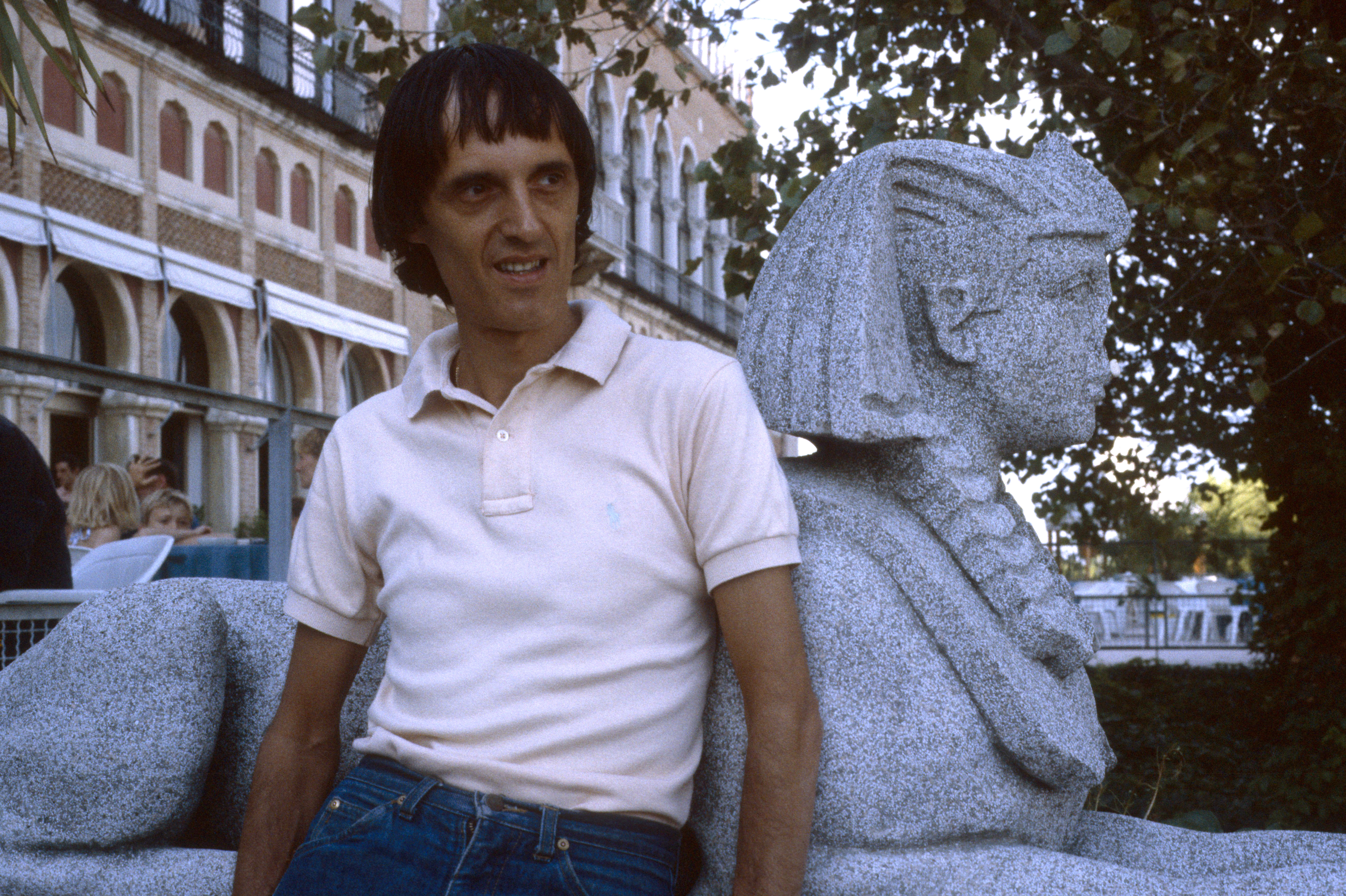
Argento in 1985

After Inferno, Argento returned to the more conventional giallo style with Tenebrae (1982). He then attempted to combine giallo and supernatural fantasy in 1985's Phenomena, also known as Creepers, which was one of Jennifer Connelly's earliest movies. Phenomena also showed Argento's predilection for using new technology, as evidenced by the film's several prowling Steadicam shots. Both films received a lukewarm reception upon their release (although each has been positively reappraised since).

Argento subsequently took a break from directing to write two screenplays for Mario Bava's son, Lamberto Bava: Dèmoni (1985) and Dèmoni 2 (1986).

Opera followed in 1987. Set in Parma's Regio Theatre during a production of Verdi's Macbeth, the production was beset by real-life misfortunes that Argento suspected were caused by the supposed traditional "curse" on the Shakespearean play. Argento's father died during its production, Vanessa Redgrave quit the project before filming began, he had problems working with his former long-time girlfriend and collaborator Daria Nicolodi on-set, and the cast and crew were plagued by several minor accidents and mishaps.

In 1987–88, Argento produced a TV series called Turno di Notte, which had 15 episodes. Nine of the shows were directed by Luigi Cozzi, the other six by Lamberto Bava. Several of the episodes starred Nicolodi and Argento's daughter Asia Argento.

Argento later produced and wrote the screenplays for two horror films directed by Michele Soavi, The Church (1989) and The Sect (1991).

=== 1990s ===
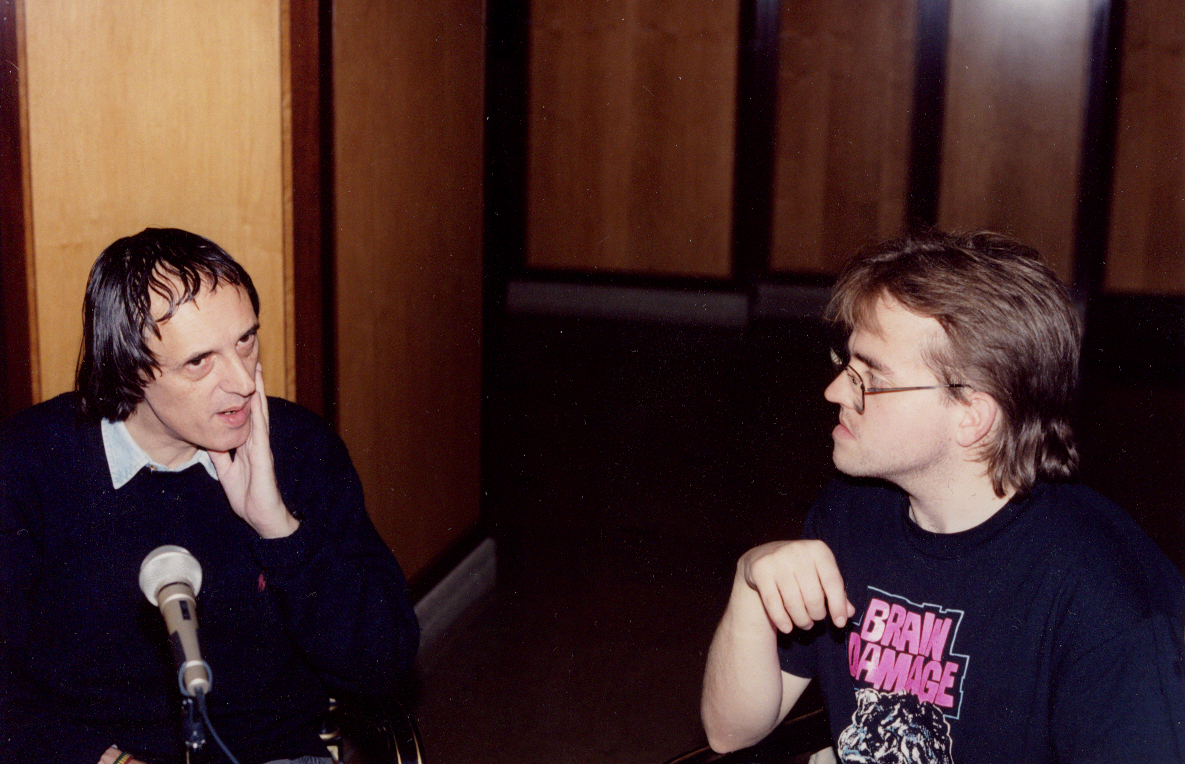
Argento being interviewed by Martin Sauvageau during the Festival International du Cinéma Fantastique de Montréal in 1994

Argento joined forces with George A. Romero for the anthology film Two Evil Eyes (filmed in 1989 and released in 1990), a two-story anthology film inspired by the works of Edgar Allan Poe; Argento served as director for the "The Black Cat" segment while Romero directed "The Facts in the Case of M. Valdemar".

In 1992, Argento filmed Trauma, starring his daughter Asia Argento, in Minneapolis, MN. It is largely a traditional giallo, but in an American setting. Like many of Argento's films, it contains an optical illusion witnessed by a character stumbling upon a murder, but he or she, like the audience, misinterprets the nature of the crime. This cinematic sleight-of-hand is one of Argento's recurring motifs.

His 1996 film The Stendhal Syndrome, in which a policewoman (played by Argento's daughter, Asia) who suffers from Stendhal syndrome is trapped by a serial killer in an abandoned warehouse, was the first Italian film to use computer-generated imagery. Moreover, the film's opening scene was shot in Florence at Italy's famed Uffizi Gallery. Argento is the only director ever granted permission to shoot there. The Stendhal Syndrome was distributed in the U.S. by cult B-movie distribution company Troma Entertainment.

In the early 1990s, Argento was interested in collaborating with Italian director Lucio Fulci on a horror film. Due to financial setbacks, the project was repeatedly postponed. In 1996, Argento was able to gather the funding, but was unable at that point to collaborate with Fulci, who died in March of that year. The film was later directed by Sergio Stivaletti as Wax Mask, with Argento and Fulci both receiving co-screenwriting credits.

Argento later directed 1998's The Phantom of the Opera and 2001's Sleepless.

=== 2000s and 2010s ===
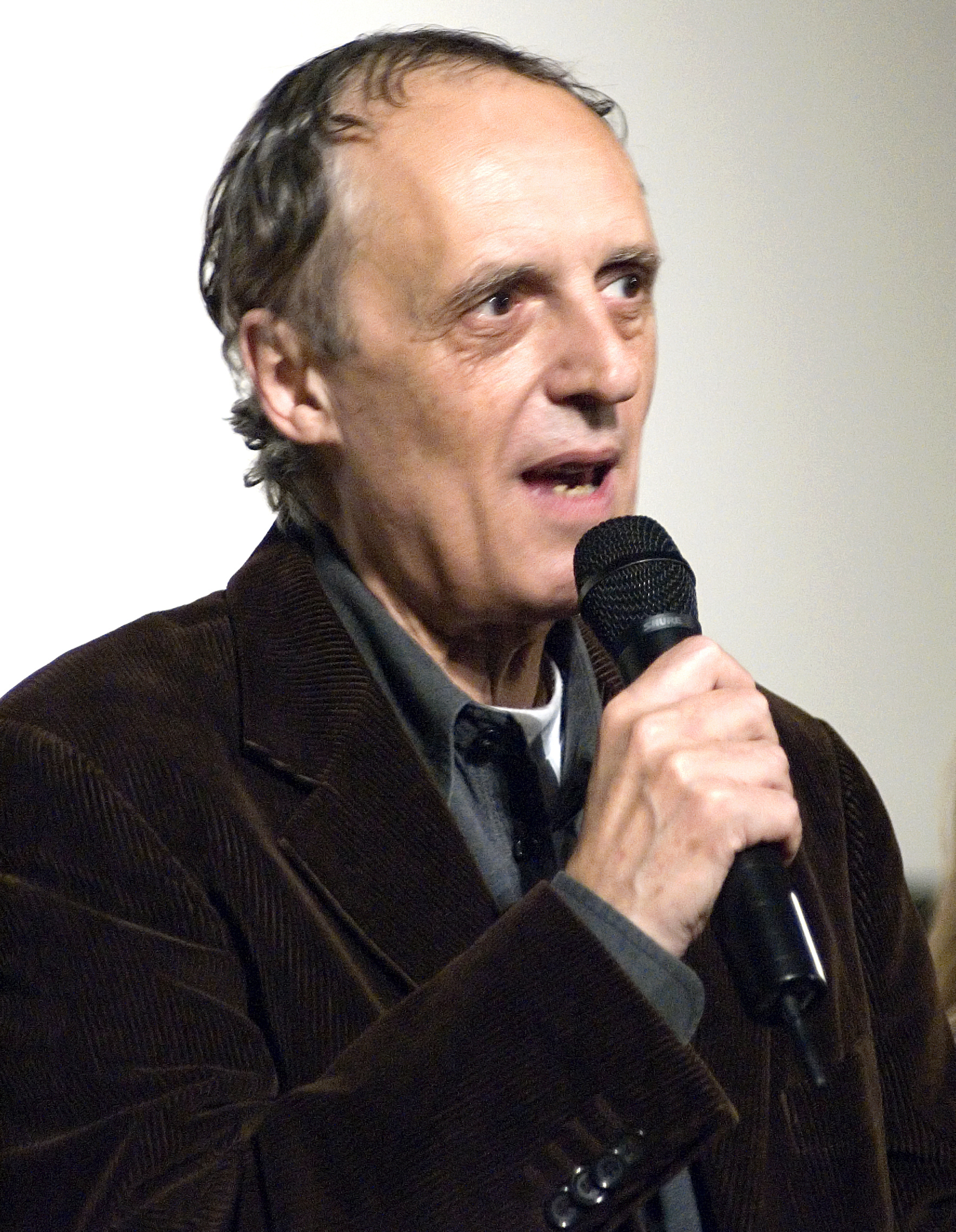
Argento discusses his film Pelts at the Torino Film Festival in 2006.

In 2004, Argento directed The Card Player, a giallo about a killer whose murders are conducted during Internet poker matches with the Rome police, which earned a mixed reception; some fans appreciated the techno music score composed by ex-Goblin member Claudio Simonetti, but felt the film was too mainstream, with little of Argento's usual flourish.

In the 2005 TV broadcast of Argento's Do You Like Hitchcock?, the director paid homage to Alfred Hitchcock after decades of being compared to him by critics. Later that year, he directed an episode of Masters of Horror, a Showtime television series, called "Jenifer". For season two of the series, Argento directed "Pelts", an adaption of the F. Paul Wilson short story of the same name.

In 2007, Argento finished the final film of his Three Mothers trilogy, The Mother of Tears, which is set in Rome and centres on the titular "third mother", Mater Lacrimarum. Argento and Jace Anderson share writing credits for the film. Asia Argento was cast as the lead player, along with her mother and frequent Argento collaborator Daria Nicolodi in a supporting role. Udo Kier, who appeared in Argento's Suspiria, and Coralina Cataldi-Tassoni, who appeared in three of his previous films, both have pivotal roles in the final Mothers chapter.

On 26 June 2009, Giallo premiered at the Edinburgh Film Festival. The following month, he announced that he had started working on a 3D remake of Deep Red, but subsequently this project was shelved due to the commercial failure of Giallo in Italian cinemas. He then announced his decision to write a new screenplay . On 4 March 2011, it was announced that Rutger Hauer had signed on to play Van Helsing in Argento's Dracula 3D, which began shooting in Budapest later in the year. It was released on 19 May 2012 to generally negative reviews.

Italian director Luca Guadagnino helmed Suspiria (2018), a remake of Argento's 1977 film after acquiring the rights to do so; Argento was unmoved by the film, save for the design.

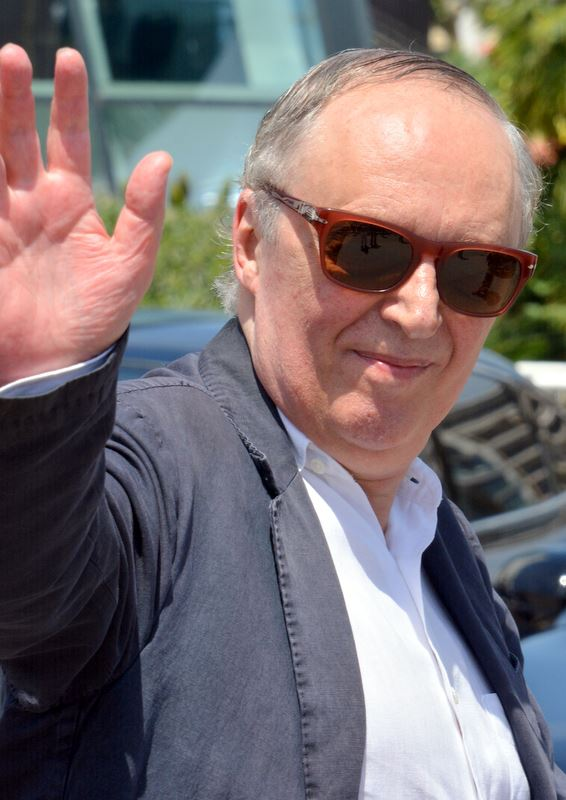
Argento at the 2017 Cannes Film Festival

=== 2020s ===
In 2021, Argento returned to acting and portrayed Lui in Gaspar Noe's 2021 psychological drama film Vortex. The film screened in the Premiere section at the 2021 Cannes Film Festival to critical acclaim for his performance.

In 2022, Argento directed Dark Glasses, in his first directorial work since the 2012 film Dracula 3D.

In 2019, Argento announced that he was developing a female-led serial movie, consisting of eight episodes, for a streaming service.

=== Unrealized projects ===
In 2014, Argento was slated to direct The Sandman, which had Iggy Pop attached to star and a script by David Tully. The film successfully raised over $195,000 from over 1,000 backers on Indiegogo in December 2014. However, filming has not commenced as of 2023, and the project producers have not updated the film's status to backers since August 2017.

== Other work ==
He is involved in operating a horror memorabilia store located at Via dei Gracchi 260 in Rome named Profondo Rosso, after his classic film Deep Red. In the cellar is a collection of his movies. The store is managed by his long-time collaborator and friend Luigi Cozzi.

He has contributed in the development of the survival horror video game Dead Space, and also in the dubbing of the Dr. Kyne character in the Italian version of the game.

He is acting as an artistic director on Clod Studio's upcoming video game Dreadful Bond.

== Personal life ==
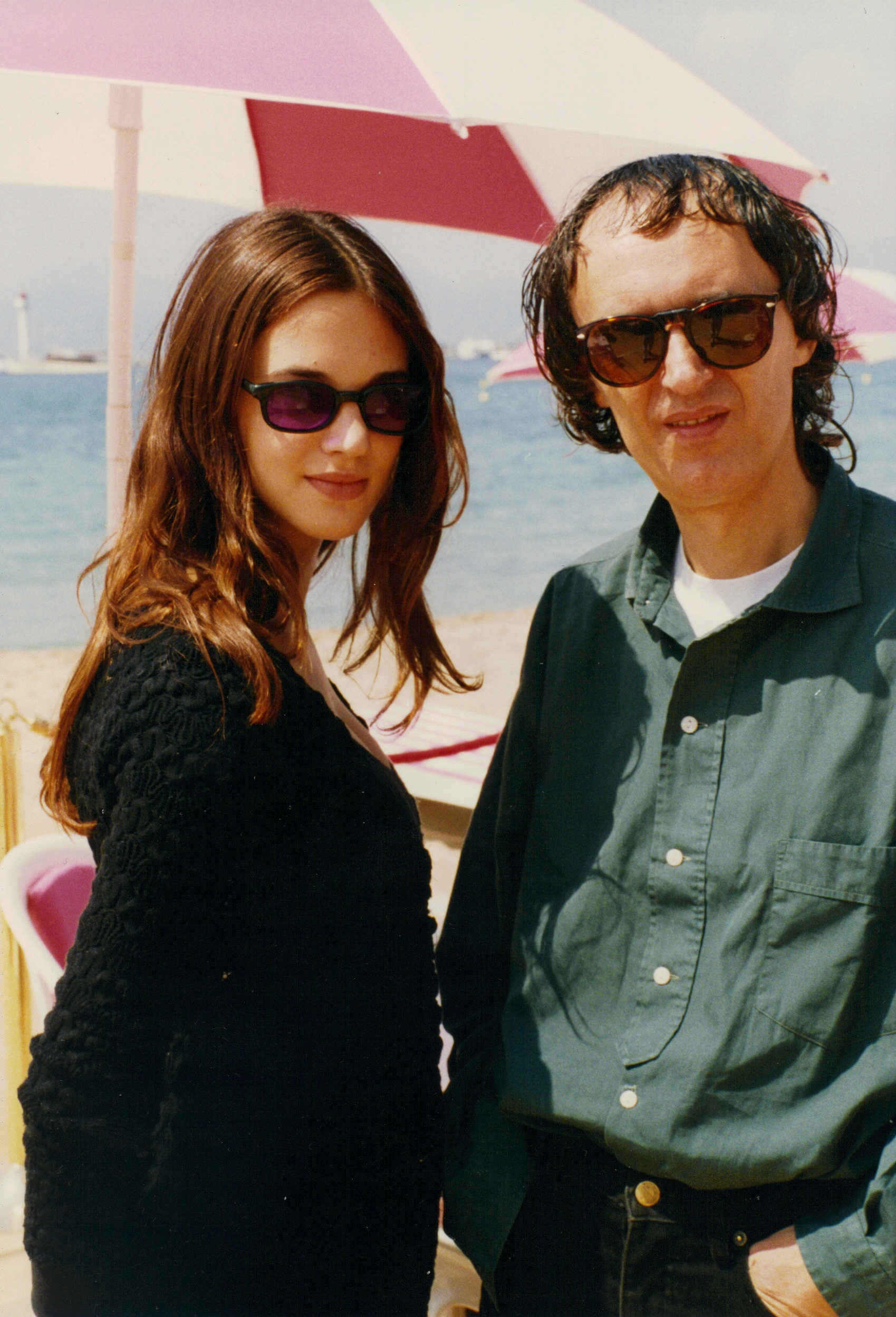
Argento in 1993 with his daughter Asia

Between 1968 and 1972, Argento was married to Marisa Casale, the great-granddaughter of Italian composer, pianist and conductor Alfredo Casella. Argento and Casale had one child, actress and costume designer Fiore Argento (born in 1970).

Argento had a professional and romantic relationship with Italian actress and screenwriter Daria Nicolodi; they met in 1974 during casting for Deep Red, and their daughter Asia Argento was born in 1975. Nicolodi co-wrote Argento's Suspiria (1977) and appeared in Argento's Deep Red (1975), Inferno (1980), Tenebrae (1982), Phenomena (1985), Opera (1987), and The Mother of Tears (2007). Argento and Nicolodi separated in 1985.

An actress and director, Asia Argento's earliest screen appearances includes roles in her father's productions Demons 2 (1986) and The Church (1989) before being directed by her father in the films Trauma (1993), The Stendhal Syndrome (1996), The Phantom of the Opera (1998), The Mother of Tears (2007), and Dracula 3D (2012).

Dario Argento is a supporter of Roman football club Lazio.

== Works and criticism ==
Maitland McDonagh wrote about Argento in her book Broken Mirrors/Broken Minds: The Dark Dreams of Dario Argento (1991). Argento is also the subject of Art of Darkness, a collection of critical essays, reviews, promotional stills, and poster art edited by Chris Gallant. British journalist Alan Jones published Profondo Argento, a compendium of set reports, interviews, and biographical detail. English sound designer, writer, and musician Heather Emmett published Sounds to Die For: Speaking the Language of Horror Film Sound, which includes the first in-depth study of the use of sound in Argento's films.

In 2012, Argento was highlighted in the retrospective Argento: Il Cinema Nel Sangue at the Museum of Arts and Design in New York City. The retrospective celebrated the influence of the Argento family on filmmaking in Italy and around the world. It highlighted Dario's contribution, as well as that of his father (Salvatore), brother (Claudio), ex-wife (Daria Nicolodi) and daughter (Asia).

=== Critical decline ===
With the exceptions of The Stendhal Syndrome and Sleepless, all of Argento's films since the "golden age" of the 1970s and 1980s have been generally poorly received by critics and fans alike, including Argento scholars such as Maitland McDonagh. Fangoria wrote in 2010, "over the last decade, standards have slipped. For a filmmaker who was always so precise in his construction and cutting, his later films such as The Phantom of the Opera and The Card Player are sloppy, stitched together so carelessly that they leak vital fluid. Gradually, the kaleidoscopic style that once characterized his films has slowly blanched away."

== Filmography ==
=== Film ===
Year	Title	Functioned as				Notes
Year	Title	Director	Writer	Producer	Other	Notes
1969	The Five Man Army	Assistant	Yes	No	No	Uncredited as assist. director
1970	The Bird with the Crystal Plumage	Yes	Yes	No	No	
1971	The Cat o' Nine Tails	Yes	Yes	No	No	
1971	Four Flies on Grey Velvet	Yes	Yes	No	No	
1973	The Five Days	Yes	Yes	No	No	
1975	Deep Red	Yes	Yes	No	No	
1977	Suspiria	Yes	Yes	No	Yes	Also composer
1978	Dawn of the Dead	No	No	Co-producer	Yes	Also editor and composer (European cut)
1978	Martin	No	No	No	Yes	Editor and composer (European cut)
1980	Inferno	Yes	Yes	No	No	
1982	Tenebre	Yes	Yes	No	No	
1985	Phenomena	Yes	Yes	Yes	No	
1985	Demons	No	Yes	Yes	No	
1986	Demons 2	No	Yes	Yes	No	
1987	Opera	Yes	Yes	Yes	No	
1989	The Church	No	Yes	Yes	No	
1990	Two Evil Eyes	Yes	Yes	Yes	No	Segment: "The Black Cat"
1991	The Devil's Daughter	No	Yes	Yes	No	
1993	Trauma	Yes	Yes	Yes	Yes	Also editor (uncredited)
1996	The Stendhal Syndrome	Yes	Yes	Yes	No	
1997	Wax Mask	No	Yes	Yes	No	
1998	The Phantom of the Opera	Yes	Yes	No	No	
2001	Sleepless	Yes	Yes	Yes	No	
2004	The Card Player	Yes	Yes	Yes	No	
2007	The Mother of Tears	Yes	Yes	Yes	No	
2009	Giallo	Yes	Yes	No	No	
2012	Dracula 3D	Yes	Yes	No	No	
2022	Dark Glasses	Yes	Yes	No	No	

==== Writer only ====
Year	Title	Director
1966	Pardon, Are You For or Against?	Alberto Sordi
1967	Qualcuno ha tradito	Franco Prosperi
1968	Today We Kill... Tomorrow We Die!	Tonino Cervi
1968	Comandamenti per un gangster	Alfio Caltabiano
1968	Commandos	Armando Crispino
1968	La rivoluzione sessuale	Riccardo Ghione
1968	Once Upon a Time in the West	Sergio Leone
1969	Cemetery Without Crosses	Robert Hossein
1969	Metti, una sera a cena	Giuseppe Patroni Griffi
1969	Probabilità zero	Maurizio Lucidi
1969	Battle of the Commandos	Umberto Lenzi
1969	La stagione dei sensi	Massimo Franciosa
1973	Man Called Amen	Alfio Caltabiano

==== Producer only ====
Year	Title	Director
2000	Scarlet Diva	Asia Argento

==== Acting roles ====
Year	Title	Role	Notes
1966	Pardon, Are You For or Against?	Priest	
1970	The Bird with the Crystal Plumage	Murderer's Hands	Uncredited
1973	The Five Days	Bandaged Man with Tranzunto	Uncredited
1975	Deep Red	Murderer's Hands	Uncredited
1977	Suspiria	Narrator	Uncredited voice role
1980	Inferno	Narrator; Murderer's Hands	Uncredited voice role
1982	Tenebre	Narrator; Murderer's Hands	Uncredited voice role
1985	Phenomena	Narrator	Uncredited voice role
1987	Opera	Narrator	Uncredited voice role
1992	Innocent Blood	Paramedic	
1996	Il cielo è sempre più blu	Man Confessing to Franciscan friar	
2021	Vortex	Father	
2023	Dario Argento Panico	Himself	Documentary film

=== Television ===
Year	Title	Functioned as			Notes
Year	Title	Director	Writer	Producer	Notes
1973	Door into Darkness	Yes	Yes	Yes	Episodes: "Il tram", "Testimone oculare"
1987	Turno di Notte	No	No	Yes	
2005	Do You Like Hitchcock?	Yes	Yes	No	TV movie
2005–06	Masters of Horror	Yes	No	No	Episodes: "Jenifer", "Pelts"

==== Acting roles ====
Year	Title	Role
2010	Tutti pazzi per amore	Ugo
2012	100 Bullets D'Argento	D'Argento

=== Video games ===
==== Acting roles ====
Year	Title	Role
2025	The Run	Priest

== Honors ==
=== Lifetime achievement awards ===
Institution	Year	Award	Result	Ref.
Capri Hollywood International Film Festival	2010	Capri Legend Award	Honored	
David di Donatello	2019	Special David	Honored	
Imagine Film Festival	2001	Lifetime Achievement Award	Honored	
Locarno Film Festival	2021	Lifetime Achievement Award	Honored	
Sitges Film Festival	2022	Golden Honorary Award	Honored	
