= Count Tacchia =

1982 film by Sergio Corbucci

Count Tacchia -Il conte Tacchia-
- Directed by: Sergio Corbucci
- Written by: Luciano Vincenzoni; Sergio Donati; Sergio Corbucci; Massimo Franciosa
- Starring: Enrico Montesano; Vittorio Gassman; Paolo Panelli; Zoe Chauveau; Ninetto Davoli
- Cinematography: Luigi Kuveiller
- Edited by: Ruggero Mastroianni
- Music by: Armando Trovajoli
- Release date: 1982
- Running time: 118 minutes 141 minutes (director's cut)
- Country: Italy
- Language: Italian

Il conte Tacchia, internationally released as Count Tacchia, is a 1982 Italian comedy film directed by Sergio Corbucci.

The main character of the film is inspired by the real count Tacchia, Adriano Bennicelli.

== Plot ==
In 1910 in Rome, the poor carpenter Francesco, by a twist of fate, is recognized as a member of a noble family in the process of decay. Francesco knows the cynical and ruthless Prince Torquato Terenzi, disappointed by life and progress, and also falls in love with the beautiful Duchess Elisa.

When Prince Terenzi dies, Francesco realizes that he is not enriched by the inheritance, because the noble family is broke; so he enlists himself for the Italo-Turkish War in Libya, but quickly returns to Italy, disgusted by the atrocities of the fighting.

== Cast ==
- Enrico Montesano: Francesco Puricelli / Count Tacchia
- Vittorio Gassman: Prince Torquato Terenzi
- Zoé Chauveau: Fernanda Toccacieli
- Paolo Panelli: Mastro Alvaro Puricelli
- Giuseppe Pambieri: Marquis Lollo D'Alfieri
- Ninetto Davoli: Ninetto
- Ania Pieroni: Duchess Elisa Savelli
- Claudio Gora: Duke Saverio Savelli
- Lia Zoppelli: Duchess Savelli
- Riccardo Pizzuti: Tomegaux
- Anita Durante: Grandmother of Fernanda

== See also ==
- List of Italian films of 1982
