= The House on the Edge of the Park =

1980 Italian exploitation horror film by Ruggero Deodato

House on the Edge of the Park
- Theatrical release poster
- Directed by: Ruggero Deodato
- Screenplay by: Gianfranco Clerici; Vincenzo Mannino
- Produced by: Franco Di Nunzio; Franco Palaggi
- Starring: David A. Hess; Annie Belle; Christian Borromeo; Lorraine De Selle
- Cinematography: Sergio D'Offizi
- Edited by: Vincenzo Tomassi
- Music by: Riz Ortolani
- Production company: F.D. Cinematografica
- Distributed by: Adige Film 76
- Release date: 5 November 1980 (Italy)
- Running time: 91 minutes
- Country: Italy
- Language: English

House on the Edge of the Park (Italian: La casa sperduta nel parco) is a 1980 Italian exploitation horror film written by Gianfranco Clerici and Vincenzo Mannino, and directed by Ruggero Deodato. It stars David A. Hess and Giovanni Lombardo Radice as two criminals who infiltrate a posh gathering in a villa and violently turn against the partygoers after they mock them. The film is a loose remake of The Last House on the Left (1972), in which Hess also starred.

== Plot ==
Alex is a serial killer driving around NYC at night when he spots a young woman, Susan, moving alongside him. He follows her to a nearby park, where he rapes her before strangling her to death. He then takes her locket as a trophy.

Sometime later, Alex and his friend Ricky are closing the underground garage where they both work, planning to go to a local disco. Before they can leave, a Cadillac pulls in with a young, well-dressed couple, Tom and his girlfriend, Lisa, who ask for help with their car. Alex refuses to help them, saying the garage is closed, but the slow-witted Ricky decides to help and quickly fixes the problem. Tom tells Alex and Ricky that they are driving to a friend's house in New Jersey for a party and invites them along. Before leaving, Alex stops by his locker, filled with various weapons he uses to murder people, and takes a straight-edged razor.

The four arrive at a large villa, where they are welcomed by the owner, Gloria, and her friends, Glenda and Howard. Minutes later, it becomes clear to Alex and Ricky that the rich people are seeking easy thrills. Gloria asks Ricky to do a striptease to some disco music and is further humiliated by being goaded to drink alcohol with each move. However, Alex stops Ricky before he strips completely naked. Tom, Howard, and Glenda next play poker with Ricky while Lisa begins sexually teasing Alex and invites him upstairs to shower with her, only to push him away.

As Alex becomes more frustrated, he sees the hosts cheating at poker with Ricky. Alex pulls out the straight-edge razor, and a fight breaks out between him and Howard. Alex throws Howard outside the back door, beats him viciously, and throws him into the pool. Laughing, Alex urinates on Howard and drags him back inside, tying him to a piano leg and proclaiming that he is running the party now.

Alex and Ricky proceed to beat on their hosts-turned-hostages, with Alex slashing Tom's face with the razor and smashing his face into the poker table. Ricky holds the others at bay with a wine bottle while Alex sexually assaults both Gloria and Glenda. Lisa runs to an upstairs bedroom where she tries to escape, but Alex catches her and proceeds to rape her. When Alex takes Lisa downstairs to rejoin the others, the doorbell rings. Alex forces Gloria to answer; when she opens the door, it's their teenage neighbor, Cindy. Alex grabs Cindy while Gloria tries to escape. Still holding the broken wine bottle, Ricky runs outside after Gloria and catches her, showing Gloria that he means no harm by tossing aside the wine bottle. Gloria responds to his simple nature by taking off her clothes and seducing him.

Inside, Alex cuts Cindy's blouse off with the razor while singing. Ricky then returns to the house with Gloria just as Alex forces Cindy to strip off the rest of her clothes and repeatedly slashes her with his razor. At this point, Ricky changes his mind and attempts to stop Alex. Upset at being betrayed by his friend, Alex turns against Ricky, slashes his abdomen wide open, and then breaks down in regret.

Bloodied and battered, Tom runs into the nearby study and pulls a 9mm pistol out from a desk drawer. Tom shoots Alex a few times, then kicks him through the glass back door. Gloria and the other women untie Howard, and the five descend upon the fatally wounded Alex lying on the ground. Tom removes the locket Alex is wearing and reveals the reason for all this: the woman Alex raped and murdered at the park is Tom's sister, and Tom wants revenge. He and Lisa lured them to Gloria's house so they could kill them and make it look like self-defense. After shouting at him, Tom shoots the wounded Alex in the groin, making him fall into the swimming pool. Tom and Lisa take turns shooting Alex, who thrashes weakly in the water before a final bullet to the head by Howard finishes him for good.

Gloria stops Howard from shooting Ricky after returning to the house, while Glenda tends to the wounded Cindy. Tom and Lisa go into the study to talk about their plan. Tom says it worked out for the best despite some mistakes, then picks up the phone to call the police.

== Cast ==
- David A. Hess as Alex
- Annie Belle as Lisa
- Christian Borromeo as Tom
- Giovanni Lombardo Radice as Ricky
- Marie Claude Joseph as Glenda
- Gabriele Di Giulio as Howard
- Brigitte Petronio as Cindy
- Karoline Mardeck as Susan
- Lorraine De Selle as Gloria

== Production ==
The entire film was shot on a low budget, in only three weeks in September 1979, after Deodato had finished production on Cannibal Holocaust. Exteriors were done on location in New York City, while Interiors were completed at Incir De Paolis Studios in Rome, Italy.

Once during an interview about the making of the film, Deodato was asked about his initial thoughts of the script when he first read it. He responded: "I thought it was too violent. I make violent films, but softer ones. But this film was full of violence, and that made me uncomfortable. When I met David Hess, I thought that with my direction I could make him do anything. But when I first read it, I found it quite disturbing."

David A. Hess claimed he had real sex with Annie Belle in their bed scene.

== Release ==
House on the Edge of the Park was initially rejected for a UK cinema certificate by the BBFC when first submitted on 16 March 1981, and later found itself on the DPP list of "video nasties" when it was revealed that the uncut version was readily available on UK video. When it was eventually passed by the BBFC in July 2002, it was cut by 11 minutes and 43 seconds, with almost all of the rape and violence either replaced or removed entirely. It was resubmitted in 2011 and received an almost uncut release, now only being cut by 42 seconds. It was finally passed fully uncut in April 2022.

In 2006, the BBFC commissioned a group of academics at the University of Wales, Aberystwyth to conduct research into people's responses to films that include scenes of sexual violence. House on the Edge of the Park is one of the films included in their remit.

=== Home media ===
The American company Media Blasters released the film on DVD through their Shriek Show label in its fully uncut form on 17 December 2002. It was released on DVD in the UK in 2011 by 'Shameless Screen Entertainment'. A limited edition Blu-ray was released by Code Red in August 2016. It was released on Blu-ray by Severin Films on 29 March 2022, with a newly scanned 4K transfer from the original camera negative, a bonus documentary disc, Deodato Holocaust, and a soundtrack CD by Riz Ortolani.

== Cancelled Sequel ==
On 27 February 2011, the Dread Central movie website exclusively reported that UK production company North Bank Entertainment were teaming up with director Deodato and actor Radice for House on the Edge of the Park Part II, a direct sequel to the original film. However, due to the passing of both Radice and Deodato, the sequel was never made.

== See also ==
- List of films featuring home invasions
