= Fracchia contro Dracula =

- Italian theatrical release poster
- Directed by: Neri Parenti
- Screenplay by: Franco Marotta; Laura Toscano; Neri Parenti; Paolo Villaggio
- Story by: Franco Marotta; Laura Toscano; Neri Parenti; Paolo Villaggio
- Produced by: Bruno Altissimi; Claudio Saraceni
- Starring: Paolo Villaggio; Edmund Purdom; Gigi Reder; Ania Pieroni; Federica Brion; Isabella Ferrari
- Cinematography: Luciano Tovoli
- Edited by: Sergio Montanari
- Music by: Bruno Zambrini
- Production companies: Maura International Film; Faso Film
- Distributed by: Titanus
- Release date: 19 December 1985 (Italy)
- Running time: 94 minutes
- Country: Italy

Fracchia contro Dracula is a 1985 Italian horror comedy film directed by Neri Parenti.

== Plot summary ==
Giandomenico Fracchia, Villaggio's "monstrously shy" character, is tasked to sell a piece of real estate in Transylvania. Otherwise, he will lose his job. The customer is the obtusely nagging and prickly accountant Arturo Filini, who suffers from heavy nearsightedness and does not realize that the manor he is interested in is actually Count Dracula's castle.

Once on the spot, Fracchia is terrified at the going-ons while Filini, in true Mister Magoo-style, dismisses them as 'tricks' to dissuade him from the estate deal. Meanwhile, a young and attractive vampire hunter (Isabella Ferrari) arrives. She is determined to avenge her brother's death, who perished trying to rid the world of Dracula and his cohorts. The events turn even more farcical when Dracula's sister confesses her love for Fracchia to try to avoid being engaged to the Frankenstein Monster. In the end an ash-tipped umbrella seems to solve the situation, but...was it all for real or just a horror-film fueled nightmare?

== Cast ==
- Paolo Villaggio as Giandomenico Fracchia
- Edmund Purdom as Count Vlad / Dracula
- Gigi Reder as Ragionier Filini
- Ania Pieroni as Countess Oniria
- Giuseppe Cederna as Boris
- Isabella Ferrari as Luna
- Susanna Martinková as Stefania
- Romano Puppo as the Frankenstein Monster
- Filippo De Gara as butler of Dracula
- Federica Brion as Catarina
- Paul Muller as employer of Fracchia
- Lars Bloch as the doctor

== Release ==
Fracchia contro Dracula was distributed theatrically in Italy by Titanus on December 19, 1985. The film grossed a total of 818,235,000 Italian lire. Film historian and critic Roberto Curti stated that the film was a commercial disappointment being released at a fruitful time of the year and only becoming the 60th highest grossing film in Italy of that year.
