= Velvet Hands =

Velvet Hands (Mani di velluto)
- Directed by: Castellano & Pipolo (Franco Castellano & Giuseppe Moccia)
- Written by: Castellano & Pipolo
- Produced by: Mario Cecchi Gori
- Starring: Adriano Celentano
- Cinematography: Alfio Contini
- Edited by: Antonio Siciliano
- Music by: Nando De Luca
- Distributed by: Cecchi Gori Group
- Release date: 1979
- Running time: 100 min
- Country: Italy
- Language: Italian

Mani di velluto, internationally released as Velvet Hands, is a 1979 Italian comedy film directed by Castellano & Pipolo. For this film Adriano Celentano was awarded with a David di Donatello for Best Actor. The film also won the David di Donatello for Best Producer.

== Plot ==
Adriano Celentano performs the role of Guido Quiller, the inventor and main patent proprietor of a virtually indestructible type of armored glass, which is used to secure jewelry shop windows. Its success occurs at the chagrin of several influential insurance companies, mainly the La Suisse Assurance in Geneva, who see their winnings from one of their most profitable income niches dwindling, so they attempt to gain the patent to the invention and then get rid of it altogether. As it so happens, Guido lives estranged from his wife Petula, the other patent holder to the glass, who would be more accessible to the insurance companies' offers. Her condition for the divorce from Guido would be that he should transfer all his exclusive rights to the production of the Quiller glass - and thereby his whole fortune - to her, whereupon she would sell them to the Swiss Assurance and gain a princely monetary compensation in return.

The day Guido announces the news that he will lose all his money to his wife, his young lover Maggie leaves him, as she was only after his money. As he races after Maggie on a defective Vespa to return her handbag she had accidentally left behind, Guido attracts the attention of Tilli, a pickpocket working the local subways who has a passion for horoscopes and Arsene Lupin, and her brother Momo, a bumbling counterfeiter, two members of a family clan of petty criminals. Their grandfather had earlier attempted to break into a jewelry shop, only to be thwarted by the Quiller glass, and was arrested by the police. When Guido crashes into a fountain, Tilli and Momo, thinking that he is a fellow thief, take him to their home; but his involuntary bath has infected Guido with laryngitis, rendering him temporarily mute and thus unable to identify himself.

Upon waking, Guido meets Tilli and develops an attraction to the pretty thief. After leaving her home and following a minor misunderstanding with the police (who assume that Guido has been kidnapped) due to his infection, he returns home and gets himself cured. He visits Tilli again, but before he can tell her his name, he learns that Tilli and her friends consider him a scumbag because of his invention. Guido eventually confides in his faithful butler, Benny, about his growing affection for Tilli and his issues concerning his true identity, whereupon Benny suggests that Guido should become a thief himself. Using his intelligence, Guido, who publicly "borrows" his butler's name to remain anonymous, bails Tilli's grandfather out of prison, becomes a highly successful master thief and gradually gains Tilli's affection.

In order to win Tilli over for good, Guido stages a breakin into his own villa, where he presents her with a ring and prepares to reveal his true identity. But an unfortunate call to the police by Leo, Guido's rival for Tilli's heart, exposes him very ungently, whereupon Tilli leaves him in a fury. The next day, however, Guido sets a trap for Tilli at her usual haunt and drags her into the next plane to Geneva, where in the office of the Suisse Assurance he demonstrates his true intentions by making her witness him surrendering his entire fortune to his ex-wife in return for the divorce. Tilli deftly steals the money from Petula, who soon notices the loss, however, and demands it back at gunpoint. But as Guido, Tilli and Benny drive off, seemingly defeated, Guido reveals to Tilli's joy that he has retained the real money while surrendering to Petula the flawed dud money Momo has produced.

== Cast ==
- Adriano Celentano: Ingegner Guido Quiller
- Eleonora Giorgi: Tilli
- Olga Karlatos: Petula Quiller
- John Sharp: Benny, the butler
- Benno Dittongo: Momo
- Gino Santercole: Leo Di Giordano
- Pippo Santonastaso: Commissioner
- Ania Pieroni: Maggie
- Sandro Ghiani: Barman
