= Lezioni di violoncello con toccata e fuga =

1976 film by Davide Montemurri

- Directed by: Davide Montemurri
- Written by: Massimo Franciosa; Luisa Montagnana; Davide Montemurri
- Starring: Carlo Giuffrè; Marina Malfatti
- Cinematography: Gábor Pogány
- Music by: Giorgio Carnini
- Release date: 1976
- Country: Italy
- Language: Italian

Lezioni di violoncello con toccata e fuga is a 1976 commedia sexy all'italiana film. It stars actor Gabriele Ferzetti.

== Cast ==
- Carlo Giuffrè as Count Riccardo
- Marina Malfatti as Stella
- Sandra Mantegna as The Countess
- Gabriele Ferzetti as Stella's father
- Mario Scaccia as The Butler
- Christian Borromeo as Stefano
- Leopoldo Trieste
- Luigi Montini

== See also ==
- List of Italian films of 1976
