= Ania Pieroni =

Italian actress (born 1957)

- Born: 28 February 1957 (age 68); Rome, Italy
- Occupation: Actress
- Years active: 1978–1985
- Spouse: Gennaro Moccia (m. 2001)
- Children: 5

Ania Pieroni (born 28 February 1957) is an Italian former actress, who is best known for The House by the Cemetery (1981), Tenebrae (1982) and Inferno (1980).

== Early life ==
Pieroni was born on 28 February 1957 in Rome to a bourgeois upper-middle-class family. Her paternal grandfather was the mayor of Pescara, while her maternal grandfather was a German architect. Her father was a Knight of Malta, a pilot who as a hobby traded American cars. She attended primary and secondary Catholic schools, and later graduated high school in Rome. On the advice of her father, who was in favor of a diplomatic career, Pieroni began attending a faculty of political sciences.

== Film career ==
Pieroni started her film career by taking a small part in the 1978 Alberto Lattuada film Stay as You Are. She also starred as a mysterious music student in the 1980 horror film Inferno by Dario Argento, and worked with him again playing a shoplifter in Tenebrae two years later. Her most famous role however was in the 1981 Lucio Fulci film The House by the Cemetery as the ill-fated babysitter Ann. Her last film was Fracchia contro Dracula, released in 1985. Pieroni was offered to reprise the role of Mater Lachrymarum in Argento's 2007 film Mother of Tears, but turned it down. From 1985 to 1991, she was the director for a local TV station called GBR.

== Personal life ==
In the 1980s, Pieroni lived in Milan, and at that time was engaged to Count Roberto Gancia. However, the Gancia-Pieroni engagement fell apart after she met and got romantically involved with Bettino Craxi, the secretary of the Italian Socialist Party (PSI). In 1991, Pieroni ended her affair with Craxi and became involved with Osman Mancini, a journalist from GBR (the private TV channel Pieroni was heading at the time). When Craxi got involved in the Mani pulite scandal, he took refuge in Tunisia. Pieroni is recognized for being the only one of those who were involved not to "hide". On 19 September 2001, Pieroni married Neapolitan industrialist and steel mogul Gennaro Moccia. Pieroni returned to public life when she helped and participated in the election campaign for Silvio Berlusconi's party, Forza Italia.

== Filmography ==
Year	Title	Role
1978	Stay as You Are	Cecilia
1979	Velvet Hands	Maggie
1980	Inferno	Musical student (Mater Lachrymarum)
1981	The House by the Cemetery	Ann
1981	Miracoloni	Maddalena
1982	Tenebrae	Elsa Manni
1982	Count Tacchia	Duchess Elisa Savelli
1984	Signore e signori	Carlotta
1985	Mai con le donne	Lisa
1985	Fracchia contro Dracula	Countess Oniria
