= Christian Borromeo =

Italian actor

- Born: Christian Borromeo; Italy
- Occupation(s): TV and film actor
- Years active: 1976–1997

Christian Borromeo is a retired Italian actor. He made several feature films, perhaps best known for Ruggero Deodato's The House on the Edge of the Park, and Dario Argento's Tenebrae.

== Career ==
Borromeo began his career with a part in the Italian film Lezioni di violoncello con toccata e fuga in 1976.

Then he went on to star as 'Germano' in the 1979 erotic comedy Ups and Downs of a Super Stud (Pensione Amore Servizio Completo) directed by Luigi Russo.

In 1980, he starred in Ruggero Deodato's ensemble-thriller The House on the Edge of the Park, and in 1982 he also played a brief, but major supporting part in Dario Argento's giallo-slasher Tenebrae, and the same year also managed to play the part of 'Lotario' in Ehrengard by director Emidio Greco.

He effectively ended his acting career in 1997, with his last movie-appearance in the TV-movie Inquietudine.

== Selected filmography ==
- Lezioni di violoncello con toccata e fuga (1976) - Stefano
- Quella strana voglia d'amara (1977) - Marco
- Nest of Vipers (1978) - Renato Richter
- The Pleasure Shop on 7th Avenue (1979) - Frank
- Ups and Downs of a Super Stud (1979) - Germano
- Stigma (1980) - Sebastian
- The House on the Edge of the Park (1980) - Tom
- Tranquille donne di campagna (1980) - Alberto
- Tenebrae (1982) - Gianni
- Ehrengard (1982) - Lotario
- Murder Rock (1984) - Willy Stark
- Senza Vergogna (1986) - Andrea De Marchi
- Intervista (1987) - Christian
- 28 minuto (1991) - Fabrizio
