= Stay as You Are =

- US theatrical release poster
- Directed by: Alberto Lattuada
- Screenplay by: Alberto Lattuada; Enrico Oldoini
- Story by: Enrico Oldoini; Paolo Cavara
- Produced by: Giovanni Bertolucci
- Starring: Nastassja Kinski; Marcello Mastroianni; Barbara De Rossi; Ania Pieroni
- Cinematography: José Luis Alcaine
- Music by: Ennio Morricone
- Distributed by: Columbia Pictures (Internationally)
- Release date: September 14, 1978 (Italy)
- Running time: 95 minutes
- Countries: Italy; Spain
- Language: Italian

Stay as You Are (Italian: Così come sei), also known as Stay the Way You Are, is a 1978 erotic drama film, directed by Alberto Lattuada, starring Nastassja Kinski, Marcello Mastroianni, Barbara De Rossi, and Ania Pieroni. An Italian–Spanish co-production, it follows the May–December romance between a vivacious young college student and a middle-aged professional who is unhappy in his marriage.

New Line Cinema gave the film a limited theatrical release in the United States on 21 December 1979. The film was released by Cult Epics in May 2015 on DVD and Blu-ray.

== Plot ==
While in Florence on business, Roman landscape architect Giulio Marengo meets an alluring college student, Francesca, and ends up spending the night with her. She is the foster daughter of an agriculturist named Bartolo who has looked after her since the death of her mother, Flora. Later, a friend of Giulio's sees Francesca in a restaurant and implies that she might be Giulio's daughter. Giulio had been going out with Flora the year before Francesca was born. Shocked at the idea, Giulio tries to cool his relationship with Francesca. Meanwhile, he is distracted by the revelation that his unmarried daughter, Alexandra, about the same age as Francesca, is pregnant.

Giulio tries unsuccessfully to get to the truth of his alleged paternity, and finally decides to tell Francesca the reason for his conflicted behavior. She flatly dismisses the insinuation, however, saying she regards Bartolo as her only true father. She then accompanies Giulio on an uninhibited holiday to Madrid, where Alexandra has gone to try and sort things out with her lover. Upon returning to Florence, Giulio must get back to Rome to attend to his business affairs; but that night Francesca insists they see the movie Vampyr together and he falls asleep. When he wakes up, she is nowhere to be seen, indicating that their love affair has run its course.

== Cast ==
- Marcello Mastroianni as Giulio Marengo
- Nastassja Kinski as Francesca
- Francisco Rabal as Lorenzo
- Mónica Randall as Luisa Marengo
- Ania Pieroni as Cecilia
- Barbara De Rossi as Alexandra Marengo
- José María Caffarel as Bartolo
- Giuliana Calandra as Teresa
- Maria Pia Attanasio as Countess Archi
- Raimondo Penne as Notary
- Claudio Aliotti
- Massimo Bonetti as the Horse Trainer
- Mario Cecchi as the Gardener
- Adriana Falco as Giulio's secretary
- Rodolfo Bigotti

== Production ==
With Stay as You Are, I dropped the grotesque style that had characterized my last film. I went back to the spirit of Guendalina and Sweet Deceptions, of which Stay as You Are is the ideal sequel.

— Lattuada, on his thematic approach

Director Alberto Lattuada shot scenes for the film at various locations in and around Florence, including the Piazza San Giovanni, the Piazza San Marco, and the Boboli Gardens. The opening title sequence was shot on the grounds of Villa La Pietra.

The musical score was composed by Ennio Morricone, who previously collaborated with the director on Matchless. A soundtrack album was released in 1978 by Cinevox, and again on 14 July 1995 by Prometheus Records. The soundtrack is notable for its inclusion of the love theme "Amore per Amore", as well as the two disco tracks "Dance On" and "Spazio 1999".

== Reception ==
This film received positive reviews, especially for Nastassja Kinski's performance. According to the American poster for this film, Bruce Williamson of Playboy called it "A truly sexy film". Time magazine also praised Kinski's performance saying, "Kinski is simply ravishing, genuinely sexy and high-spirited without being painfully aggressive about it." Conversely, Janet Maslin of The New York Times called the film "dangerously smarmy at times—dangerous because its cheapness undermines Mr. Mastroianni's essentially serious performance, which is the backbone of the movie. The film works best when the story seems to generate its sexual encounters spontaneously. But there are too many times when the plot looks like a pretext for stringing together amorous interludes."

Because Kinski was 17 years old at the time, her many nude scenes created controversy. She has since disapproved of the nudity in the film on a number of occasions. Recalling the film in a 1981 interview with People, Kinski said, "There was no one prepared to say, 'She shouldn't do that. There is no point.' No one to protect me. I was just a young girl, in Italy. It was stupid." In 2001, Kinski reiterated her dissatisfaction with her performance: "Let's put it this way, if that was my daughter, I wouldn't allow that. I wouldn't allow certain people to say certain things or to try certain things."
