= Tenebrae (film) =

1982 Italian giallo film by Dario Argento

- Italian theatrical release poster by Renato Casaro
- Italian: Tenebre
- Directed by: Dario Argento
- Written by: Dario Argento
- Produced by: Claudio Argento
- Starring: Anthony Franciosa; Christian Borromeo; Mirella D'Angelo; Veronica Lario; Ania Pieroni; Carola Stagnaro; John Steiner; Lara Wendel; John Saxon; Daria Nicolodi; Giuliano Gemma
- Cinematography: Luciano Tovoli
- Edited by: Franco Fraticelli
- Music by: Claudio Simonetti; Fabio Pignatelli; Massimo Morante
- Production company: Sigma Cinematografica
- Distributed by: Titanus
- Release date: 27 October 1982 (Italy)
- Running time: 101 minutes
- Country: Italy

Tenebrae (lit. '"darkness"', also known as Tenebre) is a 1982 Italian giallo film written and directed by Dario Argento. The film stars Anthony Franciosa as American author Peter Neal, who – while in Rome promoting his latest murder-mystery novel – becomes embroiled in the search for a serial killer who may have been inspired to kill by his novel. John Saxon and Daria Nicolodi co-star as Neal's agent and assistant, respectively, while Giuliano Gemma and Carola Stagnaro appear as detectives investigating the murders. John Steiner, Christian Borromeo, Lara Wendel, Mirella D'Angelo, Veronica Lario and Ania Pieroni also feature in key supporting roles. The film has been described as exploring themes of dualism and sexual aberration and has strong metafictional elements; some commentators consider Tenebrae to be a direct reaction by Argento to criticism of his previous work, most especially his depictions of murders of women.

After Argento had experimented with pure supernatural horror with Suspiria (1977) and Inferno (1980), Tenebrae represented the filmmaker's return to the giallo subgenre, which he had helped popularize in the 1970s. Argento was inspired by several incidents in which an obsessed fan phoned the director to criticize him for the damaging psychological effects of his previous work. The phone calls culminated in death threats towards Argento, who channeled the experience into the writing of Tenebrae. The director also wanted to explore the senselessness of killings he had seen and heard about while visiting Los Angeles in 1980, and his feeling at the time that true horror came from those who wanted "to kill for nothing".

Shot on location in Rome and at Elios Studios, Tenebrae used mostly modern-looking locations and sets, allowing Argento to realize his vision of a near-future with a diminished population; the director filmed none of the historical landmarks that usually appear in films set in Rome. Employing director of photography Luciano Tovoli, Argento also intended that the film simulate the stark, realistic lighting featured in TV police shows at the time; production designer Giuseppe Bassan created supporting environments that were cold and austere, with sharp angles and modernistic spaces. Several former members of Italian rock band Goblin provided Tenebrae's music, a synth-heavy score inspired by rock and disco.

Tenebrae was a modest success in Italy; it reached theatres with little controversy after Argento made cuts to one of the most violent scenes. However, in the United Kingdom, it was added to the infamous list of "video nasties" and banned from sale until 1999. The film's theatrical distribution in the United States was delayed until 1984, when it was released in a heavily censored version under the title Unsane, which received a mostly negative critical reception. The original version later became widely available for reappraisal and has come to be considered one of Argento's best films by many fans and critics.

== Plot ==
Peter Neal, an American writer of violent horror and thriller novels, visits Italy to promote his latest book, Tenebrae. He is accompanied by his literary agent, Bullmer, and his assistant, Anne. Neal is unaware that his embittered ex-fiancée, Jane, has also followed him to Rome. Just before Neal arrives in Rome, Elsa, a young kleptomaniac, is murdered with a razor by an unseen assailant. The murderer sends Neal a letter informing him that his works have inspired him to go on a killing spree. Neal is soon contacted by Police Captain Germani – a fan of his novels – and his partner, Inspector Altieri.

More killings take place. Tilde, a lesbian journalist and friend of Neal's who nonetheless considers his novels sexist, is murdered at her home along with her lover Marion. Maria, the young daughter of the owner of Neal's hotel, is hacked to death with an axe after discovering the killer's lair. Neal notices that TV interviewer Cristiano Berti has an unusually intense interest in his work. That night, Neal and Bullmer's assistant, Gianni, go to watch Berti's house. Gianni approaches the home alone to get a better view and witnesses Berti getting hacked to death with an axe. However, Gianni is unable to see the murderer's face and returns to Neal, only to find the novelist unconscious on the lawn.

Germani discovers that Berti was obsessed with Neal's novels and believes the killings will stop now that Berti is dead. However, Bullmer, who is having an affair with Jane, is stabbed to death while waiting for his lover in a public square. Gianni is haunted by the thought that he missed the importance of something he saw at Berti's house. He returns to the house and suddenly remembers that he had heard Berti confessing to his attacker: "I killed them all, I killed them all!" Before Gianni can share this detail with anyone, he is strangled to death in the back seat of his car.

Jane sits at her kitchen table with a pistol when a figure leaps through her window and hacks her to death. Altieri arrives at the house and is killed with an axe to the back. Germani and Anne arrive soon afterward and confront the murderer, who is revealed to be Neal. Upon learning the details of Berti's sadistic murder spree, Neal recalled a previously repressed memory involving his murder of a girl who had sexually humiliated him when he was a youth in Rhode Island. The memory tormented Neal and inflamed his previously repressed lust for blood, driving him insane.

Surrounded, Neal sees that he cannot escape and slits his throat in front of Germani and Anne. Finding the telephone out of order, they go outside to report the incident on the car radio. Germani returns to the house, where he is murdered by Neal, who has faked his death using a trick razor. Neal waits inside for Anne to return, but when she opens the door, she knocks over a metal sculpture that impales and kills Neal. A horrified Anne stands in the rain, screaming.

== Cast ==
- Anthony Franciosa as Peter Neal
- John Saxon as Bullmer
- Daria Nicolodi as Anne
- Giuliano Gemma as Captain Germani
- Carola Stagnaro as Inspector Altieri
- John Steiner as Christiano Berti
- Christian Borromeo as Gianni
- Lara Wendel as Maria Alboretto
- Mirella D'Angelo as Tilde Banti
- Veronica Lario as Jane McKerrow
- Ania Pieroni as Elsa Manni
- Mirella Banti as Marion Vaine
- Eva Robin's as Girl On Beach
- Ennio Girolami as Department Store Manager
- Marino Masé as John
- Fulvio Mingozzi as Mr. Alboretto

Uncredited

- Lamberto Bava as Elevator Repairman
- Michele Soavi as Man In Flashback

== Analysis ==
=== Influences ===
According to the film historian and critic Bill Warren, Tenebrae is a typical example of the giallo film genre: "visually extremely stylish, with imaginative, sometimes stunning cinematography", it presents "mysterious, gruesome murders, often in picturesque locations; at the end, the identity of the murderer is disclosed in a scene destined to terrify and surprise." These narrative and visual strategies had been introduced years before Argento made his first thriller, The Bird with the Crystal Plumage (1970)—most critics point to Mario Bava's The Girl Who Knew Too Much (1963) as the original giallo.

By the time Argento made Tenebrae, he had become the acknowledged master of the genre, to the point where he felt confident enough to be openly self-referential to his own past, referencing the "reckless driving humor" from The Cat o' Nine Tails (1971) and the hero from The Bird with the Crystal Plumage. The scene in which Veronica Lario's character, Jane, returns home directly references The Bird with the Crystal Plumage with its large sculpture in the entrance hallway.

Warren and Alan Jones cite a scene where a character is killed in a public square as evoking the work of Alfred Hitchcock; Thomas Rostock agrees that the editing of the sequence is in a Hitchcockian vein, while the lighting is more influenced by Michelangelo Antonioni. The film critic and author Maitland McDonagh argues that Argento's influences for Tenebrae were far broader than just his own films or previous Italian thrillers. She refers to the strong narrative in the film as an example of "the most paranoid excesses of film noir." McDonagh suggests that Fritz Lang's Beyond a Reasonable Doubt (1956) ("in which a man convicted of murder on false evidence ... is in fact guilty of the murder") and Roy William Neill's Black Angel (1946) ("in which a man who tries to clear a murder suspect does so at the cost of learning that he himself is the killer") both use such a similar plot twist to Tenebrae that Argento may have used them as partial models for his story.

Kim Newman and Alan Jones suggest that the mysteries of Arthur Conan Doyle, Rex Stout and Agatha Christie were all obvious influences on Tenebrae, and there are many references to these authors throughout the film. One example is the use of a quote from Sherlock Holmes in Conan Doyle's novel The Sign of Four (1890): "How often have I said to you that when you have eliminated the impossible, whatever remains, however improbable, must be the truth?" A variation of this quote is delivered many times in Tenebrae. Another reference is the dog attack: as something of a non sequitur, the scene is thought by Newman to be a likely nod to Conan Doyle's The Hound of the Baskervilles (1901–1902). Neal is seen to be reading this novel in an early scene. The imagery in the beach flashback references the American mystery film Suddenly, Last Summer (1959), especially the scene of Eva Robin's wearing white while kneeling in the sand, which is a direct reference to Elizabeth Taylor in that film.

=== Themes ===
Critics have identified various major themes in Tenebrae. In interviews conducted during the film's production, the usually somewhat reticent Argento offered his candid views on its thematic content. As biographer Maitland McDonagh noted in Broken Mirrors/Broken Minds: The Dark Dreams of Dario Argento, "Argento has never been more articulate and/or analytical than he was on the subject of Tenebrae." Film scholar William Hope considers the film to be devoid of classical narrative progression and states that the characters "lack a narrative function or purpose, existing only to be killed in a spectacular fashion, their death hardly moving the narrative on at all. Traditional cause and effect are seemingly forgotten or actively ignored". According to James Gracey, author of a book about Argento's work, with Tenebrae Argento "explores some of his most reoccurring themes and preoccupations, such as Freudian psychology, sexual deviancy, repressed trauma, voyeurism, audience spectatorship, and the fetishisation of violence and death." Water is often associated visually with Neal. In almost all his scenes, his appearance is followed or accompanied by a shot of water. Later, this device is used repeatedly as a clue to the ultimate killer's identity – Neal himself.

==== Duality and "dark doubles" ====
The reveal of Peter Neal standing behind Captain Germani emphasizes Argento's theme of "dark doubles", with the film constantly doubling or mirroring objects, locations, events, and characters. This scene is one of many that sets up a character with his or her doppelgänger, on both a visual and narrative level. The moment is also one of Tenebrae's most stylistically influential; the reveal of a killer – previously silhouetted by another – has been copied and referenced in many subsequent thrillers, including Brian De Palma's Raising Cain (1992).

According to Thomas Rostock, "Tenebrae" is filled with rhyming imagery that relates to the film's exploration of "the dual nature of [the] two active murderers" through doubles, inversions, reflections, and "re-reflections". Every major character has at least one double, and the theme extends to objects, locations, actions, and events – major and minor. The doubling or mirroring of incidents and objects includes telephone booths, aircraft, homeless men, otherwise-meaningless public brawls in the background, car accidents, typewriters (literally side-by-side), keys, handkerchiefs, hands caught in doors, and the characters themselves. Rostock cites several scenes where characters are set up in the frame with their doppelgängers – one such is the first meeting of Peter Neal and Anne with Detectives Germani and Altieri.

McDonagh notes that Argento emphasizes the doubling between Neal and Germani: "Germani ... is made to reflect Neal even as Neal appropriates his role as investigator ... the detective/writer and the writer/detective each belittles his other half, as though by being demeaned this inverted reflection could be made to go away." McDonagh also observes that, in what is arguably the film's most potent shock, Neal at one point really does make Germani "go away", virtually replacing him on screen "in a shot that is as schematically logical as it is logically outrageous." Earlier, Neal killed a woman who – to his and the audience's surprise – was not Anne, but Altieri. Tenebrae itself is split almost exactly into two parts. The first half belongs to the murders of Berti; the second to those of Neal. The two are set up as mirrors of one another. Berti's killings with a razor are clinical, with "lingering sexualized aggressiveness", whereas Neal's (with an axe) are crimes of passion committed for personal reasons or out of necessity; they are swift and to the point.

Kevin Lyons observes, "The plot revolves around the audacious and quite unexpected transference of guilt from the maniacal killer (about whom we learn very little, itself unusual for Argento) to the eminently likeable hero, surely the film's boldest stroke." While noting that the device is "striking", McDonagh comments that this transmission of guilt occurs between two dark doubles who are severely "warped" individuals. She suggests that "Neal and Berti... act as mirrors to one another, each twisting the reflection into a warped parody of the other." Berti's obsession with Neal's fiction compels him to commit murder in homage to the writer, while Neal seems to think that his own violent acts are simply part of some kind of "elaborate fiction". When the bloody Neal is confronted by Germani immediately after having killed numerous people, Neal screams at him, "It was like a book .. a book!"

==== Metafiction ====
The first half of the movie transitioning into the second is punctuated by the rising score and camera pan to an ostensibly meaningless point of reflected light on an ornament. According to Rostock, the meaning behind this movement is clear: it marks the spot when Berti's spree ends and Neal's rampage begins. Argento uses the shift in focus to comment on the film's own shaping, until that moment a typical "clichéd and remote" giallo. Neal, previously passive, begins to control what happens in his own story, which is more personal with "weight and meaning". According to Rostock, this structure gives Argento equal scope to play with the narrative while commenting on it, all without deviating from the plot's progression. According to Kim Newman, the use of a sculpture as a weapon makes literal one of the themes of the film: "art that kills people". Rostock concurs, saying that as the film is a commentary on art, the only weapon that can end the narrative is art itself.

According to Gracey, many have compared Argento with the character of Peter Neal, speculating that he serves as an alter ego for the director. Gracey refers to Tenebrae as a "reflexive commentary on [the director's] earlier work." The director himself saw the film in the same light, claiming it was a reaction to accusations that "[he] was a misogynist... a criminal... a murderer." Argento resolved to include all these aspects of his previous films into Tenebrae. A scene in which the character of Tilde criticizes Neal's books as "sexist", featuring "women as victims, cyphers, male heroes [and] macho bullshit" echoes criticisms of Argento's own work. Kim Newman calls the confrontation scene "essentially autobiographical", and, refuting these accusations, Argento said that his films were instead an attempt to tackle his dark side, to "let it speak". With Tenebrae in particular, he felt he was making a joke or playing a game with his critics, creating a front or mystique about himself. Rostock also believes Argento is having fun and sending up this perception. Newman agrees that Argento used Tenebrae to address his own public image, the notion that someone who creates art as "sick and twisted" as his must himself be sick and twisted. With Tenebrae's reveal that the author is the killer, Newman argues that Argento is saying, "What if I were?"

==== "Aberrant" sexuality ====
As in many of Argento's films, which apparently tend to eroticize the murder of beautiful women, gender, sexuality, and power are major issues foregrounded by the film. The fictional novel within the film is described as being "about human perversion and its effects on society". Male and female sexual deviancy is a central theme, with the victims being sexually liberated women who the first killer – conservative TV presenter Cristiano Berti – refers to as "filthy, slimy perverts". The first victim is a sexually promiscuous shoplifter, and his next two are the lesbian reporter and her bisexual lover. Berti murders the comparatively normal Maria only because she inadvertently discovers his twisted compulsion. His "moral crusade" is inspired by – and in his mind given credibility by – Neal's novel. Neal's own motivations for becoming a killer are revealed in "Freudian flashbacks". As summarized by McDonagh, these flashbacks "expose how the misogyny evident in his books actually stems from being sexually humiliated by a beautiful woman in his youth." McDonagh also notes that Tenebrae expands on the themes of sexuality and transvestitism found in Argento's earlier films, The Bird with the Crystal Plumage, The Cat o' Nine Tails, Four Flies on Grey Velvet (1972) and Deep Red (1975), but believes that Tenebrae's "overall sensuality sets it apart from Argento's other gialli." She says that the film's sexual content and abundant nudity make it "the first of Argento's films to have an overtly erotic aspect", and further notes that "Tenebrae is fraught with free-floating anxiety that is specifically sexual in nature." Gracey notes that in several scenes the victims gaze directly into the camera, which demonstrates Argento's "preoccupation with voyeurism and spectacle".

McDonagh noted that two sexually charged flashbacks are key to understanding Tenebrae. These distinct yet strongly related memory fragments recur throughout the film, usually immediately after a murder sequence. Although the flashbacks are never fully explained, the first one reveals a beautiful young woman's sexual humiliation of a teenage boy, presumed to be Peter Neal. The young woman is mostly topless during this first sequence, and she humiliates the young man by jamming the heel of one of her shiny red shoes into his mouth while he is held down by a group of gleeful boys on a beach. The second flashback shows the vicious revenge-murder of the woman sometime later. McDonagh notes that all of the fetishistic imagery of these flashbacks, combined with the sadistic details of the murder sequences in the main narrative, "set the parameters of Tenebrae's fetishistic and fetishicized visual vocabulary, couched in terms both ritualistic and orgiastically out of control... Peter Neal indulges in sins of the flesh and Tenebrae revels in them, inviting the spectator to join in; in fact, it dares the viewer not to do so."

==== Vision impairment ====
The protagonists in Argento's giallo films almost always suffer from some form of vision impairment. It is these characters' chronic inability to find the missing pieces of a puzzle. The puzzle is the solution of a murder (or series of murders) that generally provides much of the film's narrative thrust. Most obviously is the blind Franco Arno (Karl Malden) in The Cat o' Nine Tails, who must use his heightened aural sense in combination with visual clues supplied to him by his niece to solve a mystery. In The Bird with the Crystal Plumage, Sam Dalmas (Tony Musante) witnesses a murder attempt but admits to the police that something seems to be "missing"; as the film's surprise ending makes clear, he did not "miss" anything, but simply misinterpreted what happened in front of his eyes. In Deep Red, Marcus (David Hemmings) has a similar problem in both seeing and not seeing the murderer at the scene of the crime, and does not realize his mistake until it is almost too late. This recurring theme, according to Douglas E. Winter, creates "a world of danger and deception, where seeing is not believing".

Flanagan observes that in Tenebrae, Argento presents two characters with impaired vision. Gianni (Christian Borromeo) is an eyewitness to an axe murderer, but the trauma of seeing the killing causes him to disregard a vital clue. Returning to the scene of the crime, he suddenly remembers everything and is murdered before being able to tell anyone. Germani reveals that he is a big fan of the novels of Agatha Christie, Mickey Spillane, Rex Stout, and Ed McBain, but admits that he has never been able to guess the identity of the killer in any of the books. He is similarly unable to solve the real mystery until the last corpses are piled at his feet – he cannot see Peter Neal for what he really is.

==== An "imaginary city" ====
In an interview that appeared in Cinefantastique, Argento noted that the film was intended as near-science fiction, taking place "about five or more years in the future ... Tenebrae occurs in a world inhabited by fewer people, with the result that the remainder are wealthier and less crowded. Something has happened to make it that way, but no one remembers, or wants to remember ... It isn't exactly my Blade Runner, of course, but nevertheless a step into the world of tomorrow. If you watch the film with this perspective in mind, it will become very apparent." Argento later insisted that the film was set in an imaginary city, fifteen years in the future and that the disaster the city's inhabitants were striving to forget was an atomic bomb blast. Despite Argento's claim, Maitland McDonagh observed that this vaguely science-fictional concept "isn't apparent at all" and that no critics at the time noted the underlying futuristic theme in their reviews of the theatrical release of the film. The film critic and author Kim Newman countered that in avoiding a more recognisable Rome in favour of suburbia, Argento had succeeded in giving some parts of the film an almost futuristic sheen. Argento biographer Alan Jones agreed that Argento's intention did come across in these scenes, and Newman cites the on-screen use of a videophone as an attempt by Argento to place Tenebrae in the near future.

While rejecting this thematic concern as unrealized by Argento, McDonagh noted that the result of the director's experiment is a strange "architectural landscape" that becomes the "key element in differentiating Tenebrae from Argento's earlier gialli." Argento's use of unusual architectural space and so-called visual "hyper-realism" results in an enormously fake-looking environment. Seizing on the director's additional comment, "... I dreamed an imaginary city in which the most amazing things happen", she notes that the film's "fictive space couldn't be less 'real'", with its "vast unpopulated boulevards, piazzas that look like nothing more than suburban American malls, hard-edged Bauhaus apartment buildings, anonymous clubs, and parking garages." The EUR district of Rome, where much of Tenebrae was filmed, was built in preparation for the 1942 World's Fair and intended by then-Prime Minister of Italy Benito Mussolini to be a celebration of 20 years of fascism. Rostock believes that Argento used this location to realize his theme of an imaginary city; the district offers a glimpse of a future Rome that never was, showing the city as it might have looked had fascism not fallen.

== Production ==
=== Background ===
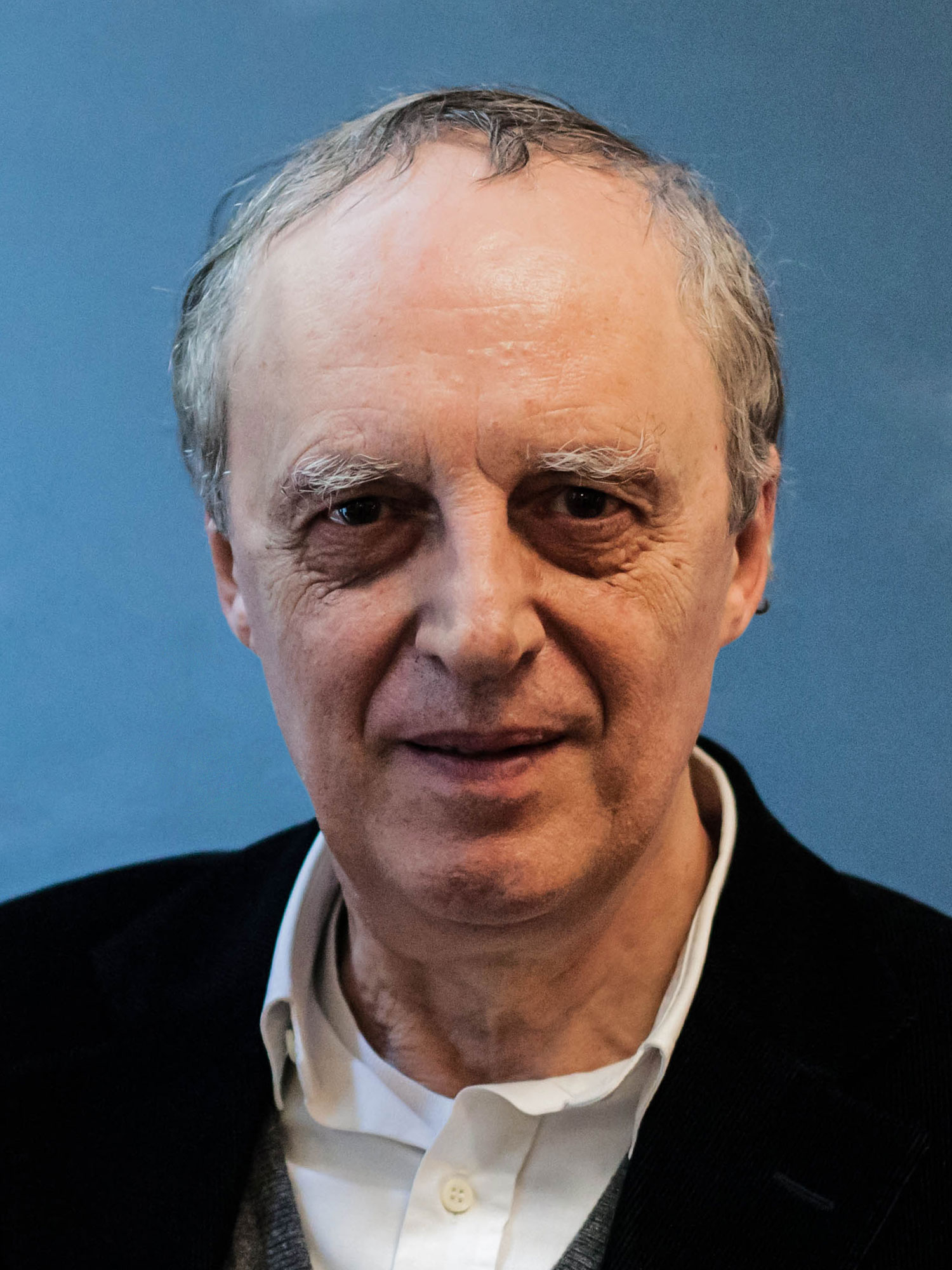
Director Dario Argento in 2014

After completing Inferno (1980), the second in his planned Three Mothers trilogy of supernatural horror films, Argento was expected to move straight into production of its concluding chapter. The first in the trilogy, Suspiria (1977), had turned the director into what Alan Jones called "a horror superstar", but Inferno had proven a difficult follow-up. Argento had become unwell while writing the film, and his ill health continued into filming. In addition, Argento's relationship with Inferno's co-producer 20th Century Fox had soured the director on "Hollywood politics", so when Inferno was not well-received upon release, Argento put the Three Mothers trilogy on hold. Inferno also flopped commercially. According to James Gracey, Argento – under pressure and feeling "the need to once again defy expectations" – returned to the giallo genre and began work on Tenebrae. Argento later stated that he wanted to "put on film a gory roller-coaster ride packed with fast and furious murders" and that he "shouldn't resist what [his] hardcore audience wanted". He added that he had also become irritated that in the years since his last giallo so many other directors had made films derivative of his own genre-defining works.

Argento said that Tenebrae was directly influenced by two distressing incidents that occurred in 1980. On a break from filmmaking after Suspiria's surprise success, Argento was spending time in Los Angeles, where an obsessed fan telephoned him repeatedly, to talk about Suspiria's influence on him. According to Argento, the calls began pleasantly enough but before long became more insistent, eventually menacing. The fan claimed that he wanted "to harm Argento in a way that reflected how much the director's work had affected him", and that because the director had "ruined his life", he in turn wanted to ruin Argento's. Although no violence came of the threat, Argento said he found the experience understandably terrifying and felt unable to write. At the advice of his producers, Argento fled to the coastal city of Santa Monica, where he felt safe enough to resume writing. However, after a few weeks, the fan found Argento and resumed his calls, issuing more threats. The director decided to return to Italy. Argento felt the escalating nature of the fan's threats was "symptomatic of that city of broken dreams" with its "celebrity stalkers and senseless crime". The second incident occurred during Argento's stay at The Beverly Hilton, where a Japanese tourist was shot dead in the hotel lobby. Later hearing of a drive-by shooting outside a local cinema, Argento reflected on the senselessness of the killings: "To kill for nothing, that is the true horror of today... when that gesture has no meaning whatsoever it's completely repugnant, and that's the sort of atmosphere I wanted to put across in Tenebrae."

=== Casting ===
Argento reportedly offered the lead role of Peter Neal to Christopher Walken, but eventually, it went to Anthony Franciosa. Kim Newman felt that Franciosa's casting was fortunate, as he was capable of bringing more to the role than the script asked of him. He also believed that if Walken had been cast, it would have been more obvious that he was the killer. According to Jones and Daria Nicolodi, the relationship between Franciosa and Argento was a fractious one. In addition, Nicolodi and Argento were romantically involved at the time, but their relationship had suffered over a disputed story credit during the filming of Suspiria. Nicolodi therefore only agreed to a brief appearance in Tenebrae. By her own account, she originally asked for the small role of Jane McKerrow; which ultimately went to Veronica Lario. Nicolodi was, according to Alan Jones, cast as the woman on the beach in Neal's flashback. Conversely, Thomas Rostock states that Nicolodi was never intended for that role, only that of Jane. Transgender actress Eva Robin's was later hired to play the woman on the beach.

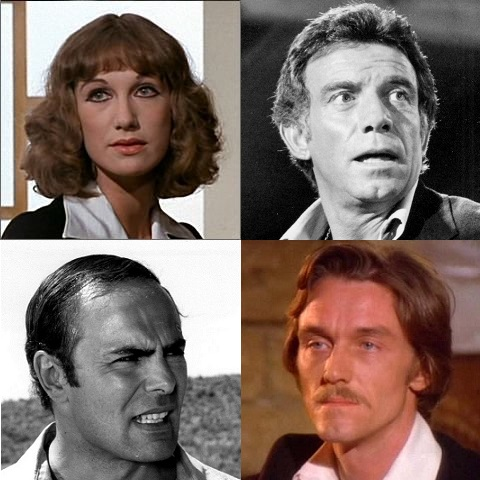
Clockwise, from top left: Daria Nicolodi, Anthony Franciosa, John Steiner, John Saxon

When the American actress hired to play Anne dropped out just before principal photography began, Argento convinced Nicolodi to take on the larger role. Nicolodi found Anne to have a different personality than her own, and much preferred the characters she had played for Argento previously, who she said had much more personality than Anne. She said the role required little energy or imagination, but she liked the novelty of playing neither killer nor victim. Newman and Alan Jones agreed that Nicolodi had very little character to play, as written. Newman added that this lack of character stretched to all the Italians in the film, and that only the American characters had discernible personalities. Nicolodi later claimed that although filming began well enough, Argento became angry when she and Franciosa bonded over playwright Tennessee Williams and their experience in theatre, leading the director to make sure their shared scenes "were an ordeal to endure". The charged atmosphere culminated with Argento reportedly telling Franciosa, "leave my woman alone!" Nicolodi said she channelled her frustrations with the situation into her character's last scene in the film, where Anne stands in the rain and screams repeatedly, continuing over the film's end credits. She had been directed to scream only a little, but knowing it was the last day of filming and her last scene to complete, Nicolodi screamed loudly and for a long time, much to Argento's and the crew's surprise. Nicolodi said the scene was her "cathartic release from the whole nightmare".

Although Tenebrae was an Italian production, most of the cast spoke their dialogue in English to increase the film's chances of success in the United States. For domestic audiences, the film was dubbed into Italian. The English-language dub retained Franciosa's, Saxon's, and Steiner's natural voices. However, Nicolodi's voice was dubbed by Theresa Russell, Giuliano Gemma's was dubbed by David Graham, and most of the female voices were dubbed by Adrienne Posta. Michele Soavi – frequent Argento collaborator, second assistant director on Tenebrae and later a noted director in his own right – acted alongside Robin's in the second flashback scene. Another of Argento's collaborators, Fulvio Mingozzi cameoed as a hotel porter. In common with several other Argento films, close-ups of the killer's gloved hands were Argento's own. In the film's Italian-language dub, Argento also provided the opening voice-over, reading aloud descriptions of murderous actions from Neal's fictitious novel, Tenebrae.

=== Filming ===
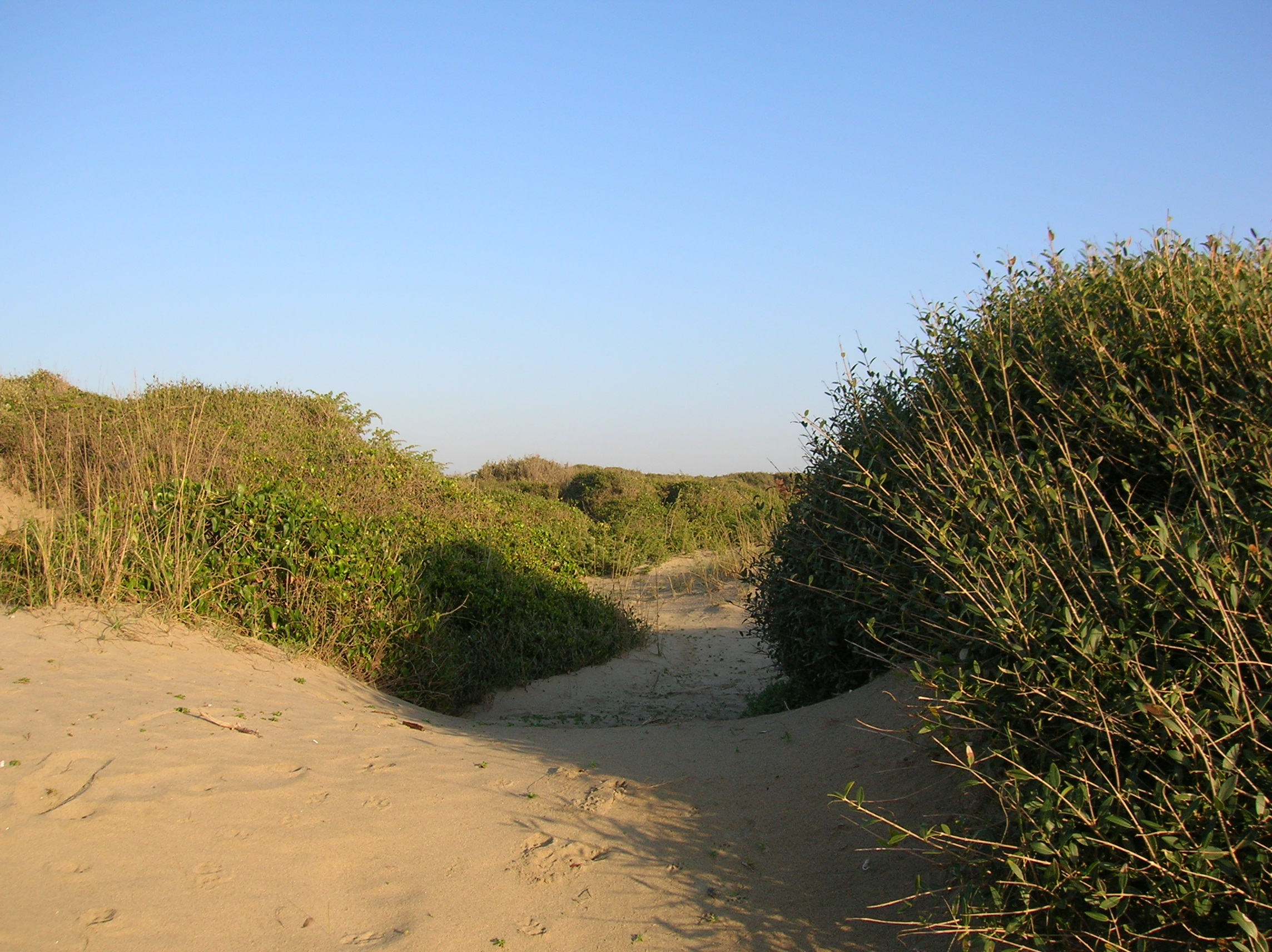
The first flashback scene was filmed at Capocotta beach, south of Rome.

Filming began on 3 May 1982 and took 10 weeks; it was shot mostly on location in Rome. Kim Newman described the Rome of Tenebrae as unlike the one shown on TV and in films, with none of the usual historical landmarks. Newman and Alan Jones agreed that this was a deliberate choice made by Argento, as some of his previous films had utilized so much of recognisable Italy. Argento himself said he had wanted to show Italy was not just a museum piece; Newman said it was Argento's way of saying, "Rome is a vibrant city. It is modern." Most of Tenebrae's location shooting was carried out in Rome's EUR business and residential district. The first flashback scene was filmed at the Capocotta beach, south of the city near Ostia. The shoplifting scene was filmed on location at department store La Rinascente, off Piazza Fiume. Bullmer's death in a public square was shot at a shopping precinct called "Le Terrazze" in Rome's Casal Palocco residential neighbourhood. The scene in which Neal's landlord's daughter is killed was filmed outside the home of an architect – and friend of Argento – Sandro Petti, switching to studio shots for her initial entrance into the house and back to Petti's house for the confrontation with the killer. The scene where Neal boards his flight to Rome was filmed at John F. Kennedy International Airport in New York.

Giuseppe Bassan – a frequent Argento collaborator – was the film's production designer. The surroundings are given a bleached, "merciless" look, made from marble and stone façades, shiny metallic sculptures, with steel, water, and glass surfaces. Some of the homes – specifically those of the lesbian couple and the first killer – are "cold, austere, brutalist" slabs of granite, and many interior shots feature plain white backgrounds, with characters wearing pale-coloured clothes against them – better, Newman felt, to contrast the blood once the violence started. The studio-set scenes were filmed at Elios Studios, unlike Argento's previous films in Rome, which he had filmed at Incir De Paolis. He was not able to use Elios, as the director Michelangelo Antonioni, of whom he was a huge fan, was using the studio to film Identification of a Woman (1982) at the time. Tenebrae's special effects were supervised by Giovanni Corridori, who – with his brother Tonino – had a near-monopoly on special effects in the Italian film industry at the time. The scene in which Jane is hacked to death after having her arm cut off was filmed about eight times. Argento was not satisfied with any of the takes he had, which used a type of bicycle pump to spray fake blood from the "wound" across the white wall, so the director had Corridori place an explosive squib in the prosthetic arm – a solution which apparently satisfied Argento.

Much of Tenebrae takes place during the daytime or in harshly overlit interiors. Except for the finale and some nighttime scenes, the entire movie is shot in clear, cold light that permeates the surroundings. The lighting and camerawork used in Andrzej Żuławski's Possession (1981) was an influence on the film's look. Although tenebr(a)e means "darkness" or "shadows" in Latin, Argento ordered cinematographer Luciano Tovoli to use as much bright light as possible. The director intended that the film be set in the near future and wanted the lighting to help create a "cold, stark and semi-futuristic look". Argento explained that this approach was also an attempt to imitate what he saw as the "realistic manner of lighting" used in television police shows. The director explained that he was adopting "a modern style of photography, deliberately breaking with the legacy of German Expressionism. Today's light is the light of neon, headlights, and omnipresent flashes... Caring about shadows seemed ridiculous to me and, more than that, reassuring." Argento filmed half-empty streets and shops where he could, in an attempt to reflect a futuristic setting where a disaster had diminished the population of his imaginary city significantly. Tovoli used Kodak 5247 film stock (125 ASA speed rating) for daylight scenes, and Kodak 5293 (250 ASA) for night shoots. Tovoli rated both at 300 ASA to ensure controlled overexposure of the negative during filming, for the benefit of under-developing in the lab and less colour loss. The ultimate aim was for the images to be "crystal clear", and the night scenes to be awash with light.

Film scholar Richard Dyer highlights several intelligent devices Argento uses in the film's editing, noting that interpolated sequences are sometimes punctuated by "shots of pills and the sound of running water." Steffen Hantke believes that the shock cuts in the latter part of the film are among cinema's "most brutal and stylized", and exhibit a degree of abstract expressionism. Film scholar Leon Hunt argues that the devices and themes utilized by Argento in the making of Tenebrae make it as much an example of art cinema as anything else. The initial murders are shot in a "clipped montage style", which is later revealed to reflect the first killer's use of a camera to record the scene. Giuliano Gemma later said that Argento fostered an improvisational atmosphere on set. One example he gave was the scene where his character bends to pick up some evidence from the floor, only to reveal Neal behind him, having perfectly matched his position relative to the camera. This moment was not scripted but resulted from Argento's noticing the actors' similar build while they were standing, one behind the other in front of him.

==== Crane shot ====
"The crane shot ... should be one of the most memorable moments in cinema ... The shot begins outside the lower apartment window, moves up to the second-floor window, up and over the roof, down the other side, and to a window on the opposite side of the building. The shot lasts two and a half minutes without a pause, jerk, or cut. If I were to be stuck on a desert island, I'd want Tenebrae just so I could watch this single shot. The shot stands out even more with the fact that the Luma [sic] camera used was new to the industry at the time, and was bulky and not as easy to use as it is now."

— Patrick McAllister, 2004

Gracey refers to the film's cinematography as "nothing short of astounding", and cites a particular example as highlighting Argento's "passion for technical prowess and breathtaking visuals". Influenced by the penultimate shot in Antonioni's The Passenger (1975), on which Tovoli had also been the cinematographer, one of Tenebrae's main setpieces is the murder of the lesbian couple. To introduce the scene, Argento and Tovoli employed the use of a Louma crane to film a several minutes-long tracking shot. Owing to its extreme length, the tracking shot proved the most difficult and complex part of the production to complete. It required a maze of scaffolding to be built around the outside of the home. Argento captured all the footage he needed in two takes, but insisted on filming ten more. The scene, which lasts for two-and-a-half minutes on-screen, took three days to shoot. It marked the first time the Louma crane had been used in an Italian production; the crane itself had to be imported from France. According to Gracey, the camera performs "aerial gymnastics", scaling the victims' house in "one seamless take, navigating walls, roofs, and peering in through windows, in a set piece that effortlessly exposes the penetrability of a seemingly secure home". Newman and Jones said that although this type of crane shot became commonplace later, at the time it was "truly ground-breaking" in the way the camera seemingly crawled over the walls and up the building – not quite from the killer's viewpoint. Patrick McAllister of Scifilm said the sequence should be considered "one of the most memorable moments in cinema". According to McAllister, Tenebrae's distributor begged Argento to cut the shot down because it was "meaningless". Newman and Jones agreed that the shot added nothing to the film's plot, but called it "meaninglessly brilliant".

=== Title ===
Some European publicity materials for the film, including posters and lobby card sets, advertised the film as Tenebre, and the 1999 Anchor Bay DVD release uses that same title. However, on the print itself, during the opening credits, the title is clearly Tenebrae. In addition, the title of Neal's latest book in the film is shown in close-up as being Tenebrae. In a lengthy interview with Argento conducted by Martin Coxhead that appeared in two issues of Fangoria in 1983 and 1984, the title was always referred to as "Tenebrae". Early on in production, the film was referred to as Under the Eyes of the Assassin, which was later used as one of the poster taglines. In Japan, the film was released as Shadows; in the United States, it was titled Unsane in its initial – heavily edited – incarnation.

== Soundtrack ==
Tenebrae CD cover

Goblin had provided the scores for two of Argento's previous films, Deep Red (1975) and Suspiria (1977), but the director had employed English composer Keith Emerson for his foray outside of the giallo subgenre, 1980's Inferno. Goblin had disbanded that year, but in 1982 Argento asked three of the band's former members – Claudio Simonetti, Fabio Pignatelli, and Massimo Morante – to work on Tenebrae. Owing to their history together, Simonetti felt it appropriate that Argento's return to giallo films should use the core members of Goblin. The resulting synth-driven score was credited to "Simonetti-Pignatelli-Morante", as Goblin's former drummer owned the rights to use the band's name.

Tenebrae's score is very different from those the band had produced for Argento previously. In the early 1980s, Simonetti experimented with dance music, and he opted for a more electronic sound for Tenebrae. Simonetti described the score as an electronica/rock hybrid, with the main theme including disco elements. So it would not be difficult to accommodate Argento's preference for long takes, Simonetti, Pignatelli, and Morante made sure to play each song for 3–4 minutes. Recording the score, Simonetti used the Roland Jupiter-8, Roland Vocoder Plus and Minimoog synthesizers, as well as a piano, electric piano, the Oberheim DMX drum machine, the Roland TR-808 drum machine, and Roland MC-4 music sequencer. Pignatelli played bass and fretless guitar, while Morante played electric and acoustic guitar.

While the soundtrack is not as well regarded as Goblin's earlier scores for Deep Red, Suspiria, or Dawn of the Dead (1978), Tim Lucas felt it "... so fused to the fabric of the picture that Tenebrae might be termed ... a giallo musicale; that is, a giallo in which the soundtrack transcends mere accompaniment to occupy the same plane as the action and characters." Writers David Kerekes and David Slater were also favorable to the score; writing that the film "bristles with arresting imagery and a cracking musical score from ex-members of Goblin". Simonetti felt the score was good, but that it was only a "medium"-level success. However, it did enjoy a second wave of popularity being remixed in clubs. The album has had multiple reissues in numerous countries since its original release in 1982 on the Italian Cinevox label. The album was also released by Waxwork Records on a double LP that included the complete score by Goblin in 2018.

== Release ==
=== Original reception and censorship ===
Tenebrae had a wide theatrical release throughout Italy and mainland Europe, something Argento very much needed after having suffered major distribution problems with his previous film, Inferno. Released on 27 October 1982, Tenebrae saw modest success at the box office in Italy and Europe, but it did not perform as well as some of Argento's previous films. In Italy, Tenebrae had been released with a VM18 rating, meaning it could not be seen legally by persons under the age of eighteen. Argento had desired a VM14 rating, both to attract a younger audience and to increase the film's chances of commercial success. Tenebrae features scenes of female homosexuality; attitudes towards homosexuality in Italy were fairly conservative at the time, and Argento said he wanted to "recount this subject freely and in an open manner, without interference or being ashamed". The VM18 rating upset him, as he believed it was a result of the sexual diversity on display rather than the film's violence.

The London Underground poster campaign replaced the slashed neck with a red ribbon.

One of the film's most excessively violent scenes features the death of Neal's ex-wife, Jane (played by Veronica Lario). This scene suffered the most from cuts when the film was first released in Italy. The original scene featured Jane's arm being cut off at the elbow; blood sprays from the wound onto white walls until the character falls to the floor. After a back-and-forth between Argento and Italian censors (at the time, a panel of judges), the scene was first trimmed from showing an "immense" spray to a small one, then a smaller one still. For TV broadcasts, the scene was cut to insignificance in the 1990s, when Lario married future Italian Prime Minister Silvio Berlusconi. According to Alan Jones, Berlusconi "did not want the public seeing [Lario] so explicitly murdered, even if it was in a film by his country's premier horror expert".. For a few years, it was impossible to legally see the film's uncensored version in Italy, as prints were withdrawn altogether. A later DVD release did become available, with the scene restored.

Averaging a murder every 10 minutes, Tenebrae ranks as one of Argento's most violent films. In the UK, the film was shorn of five seconds from the arm severing scene by the British Board of Film Classification before its theatrical release, on 19 May 1983. The advertising campaign for Tenebrae featured posters and a soundtrack sleeve depicting a woman with her throat cut, blood dripping from the wound. According to Jones, who worked for Tenebrae's distributor at the time, in the UK the posters had to be recalled after the London Underground refused to run them. New posters were issued, replacing the image of the wound and blood with a red ribbon. A similar change was made to the soundtrack sleeve.

In the United States, the film remained unseen until 1984, when Bedford Entertainment briefly released a heavily edited version under the title Unsane. It was approximately ten minutes shorter than the European release and was missing nearly all the film's violence, which effectively rendered the many horror sequences incomprehensible. Also, certain scenes that established the characters and their relationships were excised, making the film's narrative difficult to follow. This version of Tenebrae received nearly unanimously negative reviews.

=== Home media and "video nasty" list ===
Tenebrae has been released on home media in various versions across numerous territories. In 1983, when the VHS edition was released in the UK, it was cut by about four seconds. However, the film soon found itself included in a list of 39 so-called "video nasties" that were successfully prosecuted and banned from sale in UK video stores under the Video Recordings Act 1984. Deemed harmful to audiences, "video nasties" were strongly criticized for their violent content by the press, social commentators and various religious organizations. Speculating in 2011, Thomas Rostock said that the higher-than-usual murder count for an Argento film was partially responsible, while James Gracey believed it was perhaps "the highly sexualized presentation of its violent content". He went on to say, "Of all the titles placed on the video nasty list, Tenebrae is perhaps the most misunderstood and undeserving of the grimy status it gained through its association with the whole debacle." Kim Newman agreed that Tenebrae's reputation as a "video nasty" was unwarranted, saying that none of the on-screen deaths are as gory or lingering as those in Argento's previous films. He also believed Tenebrae would eventually be remembered on its own merits, rather than as part of the "video nasties" list. Nevertheless, the ban lasted until 1999, when Tenebrae was legally released on videotape with one second of footage removed in addition to the previously censored five (the BBFC-censored footage was uploaded as a video file, viewable on the distributors (Nouveax Pictures) website, in a clear signal of changing times). In 2003, the BBFC reclassified the film and passed it without any cuts. In Germany, the release was strongly cut, and reportedly seized by the authorities.

The film has since been released on DVD in the US, mostly uncut save for approximately twenty seconds of extraneous material. Tenebrae received an initial DVD release in March 1999 from Anchor Bay Entertainment, with a re-release in May 2008. The Anchor Bay release, though presented as "uncut" was not the fully restored version of the film. A German DVD release by Raptor was also missing about one-and-a-half seconds of material. In June 2011, Arrow Films issued a special edition on DVD, but although the image quality was far better than in previous DVD releases, this version was "heavily lambasted" for carrying a transfer of the film that had visible noise and "distorted audio". In 2013, Arrow released a Blu-ray edition that corrected the audio and video problems. Additional corrections were made to the transfer and released by Synapse Films in 2016, as a steelbook edition limited to 3000 copies. The Arrow & Synapse DVD and Blu-ray releases are "completely uncut".

=== Later reception ===
Tenebrae has since been regarded by many fans and critics as among Argento's best films, with some calling it his last great film. AllMovie refers to the film as "one of Dario Argento's best thrillers". In her 1994 book on the director, Broken Mirrors/Broken Minds: The Dark Dreams of Dario Argento, Maitland McDonagh maintains that Tenebrae is "in many respects ... the finest film that Argento has ever made." Richard Dyer, writing for the Directory of World Cinema: Italy, describes the film as a "tease", one which is "perhaps the apotheosis of one of the core pleasures of detective fiction: being outwitted, wrong-footed, led up the garden path". Dyer believes that the degree of lighting used in the film is unsurpassed. Ed Gonzalez of Slant Magazine said that Tenebrae "is a riveting defense of auteur theory, ripe with self-reflexive discourse and various moral conflicts. It's both a riveting horror film and an architect's worst nightmare." Keith Phipps of The A.V. Club noted "... Argento makes some points about the intersection of art, reality, and personality, but the director's stunning trademark setpieces, presented here in a fully restored version, provide the real reason to watch." Almar Haflidason, in a review for BBC Online, opined, "Sadistically beautiful and viciously exciting, welcome to true terror with Dario Argento's shockingly relentless Tenebrae." Tim Lucas in Video Watchdog said, "Though it is in some ways as artificial and deliberate as a De Palma thriller, Tenebrae contains more likeable characters, believable relationships, and more emphasis on the erotic than can be found in any other Argento film." Gordon Sullivan of DVD Verdict wrote, "Tenebre is a straight-up giallo in the old-school tradition. It may have been filmed in 1982, but it comes straight out of the '70s tradition. We've got all the usual suspects, including a writer for a main character, lots of killer-cam point of view, some crazily over-the-top kills, and approximately seventy-two twists before all is revealed... For fans of Argento's earlier giallo, this is a must-see."

Not all the recent critical reaction to Tenebrae has been positive. Geoff Andrew of Time Out thought that the film was "unpleasant even by contemporary horror standards". John Kenneth Muir, author of Horror Films of the 1980s, considers the film to be far inferior to Suspiria, but acknowledges that it was so "unremittingly gory" that it justified its US title of "Unsane". John Wiley Martin, although evaluating the film as a "technically mesmeric" one, felt that thematically it was a "disappointingly retrograde step" for Argento. Christopher Null of Filmcritic.com called it a "gory but not particularly effective Argento horror flick." Gary Johnson, editor of Images, complained, "Not much of Tenebre makes much sense. The plot becomes little more than an excuse for Argento to stage the murder sequences. And these are some of the bloodiest murders of Argento's career." In 2004, Tim Lucas re-evaluated the film and found that some of his earlier enthusiasm had dimmed considerably, noting that, "Tenebre is beginning to suffer from the cheap 16 mm-like softness of Luciano Tovoli's cinematography, its sometimes over-storyboarded violence (the first two murders in particular look stilted), the many bewildering lapses in logic ... and the overdone performances of many of its female actors".

On Rotten Tomatoes the film has an acceptance rating of 83% with an average score of 6.80/10 out of 29 reviews, on Metacritic it has a score of 83 out of 11 reviews, indicating “Universal Acclaim”.

== Legacy ==
Coming at the tail end of the giallo cycle, Tenebrae does not appear to have been as influential as Argento's earlier films. Douglas E. Winter, however, has commented that Tenebrae's Louma crane sequence has been stylistically influential, pointing to its use in Brian De Palma's The Untouchables (1987). In addition, towards the end of the film, with Neal supposedly dead, the camera faces Detective Giermani directly. When he stoops to pick up some evidence from the floor, Neal is revealed to be standing behind him, their silhouettes having perfectly matched in the shot. Alan Jones cited Tenebrae as the first film to use this specific type of camera blocking, and believes it to have been copied and referenced deliberately by later filmmakers. One such example, discussed as an unacknowledged "steal" from Tenebrae, is De Palma's "surprise reveal" of John Lithgow standing behind a victim in Raising Cain (1992). Robert Zemeckis's What Lies Beneath (2000) also contains a similar moment, although Zemeckis has denied familiarity with Italian films.

The final death scene in Tenebrae – where Neal is accidentally impaled by a sculpture – is directly referenced in Kenneth Branagh's Hitchcockian murder mystery Dead Again (1991). Kim Newman maintains that Branagh's film imitates the sequence so entirely – with Derek Jacobi being pierced by the sculpture – that Branagh must have included the reference deliberately. The next moment, where Nicolodi screams repeatedly in the rain, was cited by Asia Argento (Nicolodi's daughter with Dario Argento) as the moment that inspired her to become an actress.

== See also ==
- List of cult films
- List of Italian films of 1982
