= Piranha (film series) =

Horror film series

Piranha is a horror film series that consists of five films.

== Films ==
Film	U.S. release date	Director(s)	Screenwriter(s)	Producer(s)
Piranha	August 3, 1978	Joe Dante	John Sayles	Roger Corman, Jon Davison and Chako van Leeuwen
Piranha II: The Spawning	November 5, 1982	James Cameron	Ovidio G. Assonitis, James Cameron and Charles H. Eglee	Chako van Leeuwen and Jeff Schechtman
Piranha	October 1, 1995	Scott P. Levy	Alex Simon	Chako van Leeuwen and Mike Elliott
Piranha 3D	August 20, 2010	Alexandre Aja	Pete Goldfinger and Josh Stolberg	Alexandre Aja, Mark Canton, Marc Toberoff and Grégory Levasseur
Piranha 3DD	June 1, 2012	John Gulager	Patrick Melton, Marcus Dunstan and Joel Soisson	Mark Canton, Marc Toberoff and Joel Soisson

=== Piranha (1978) ===
Piranha is a 1978 American horror film about a swarm of killer piranhas. It was directed and co-edited by Joe Dante and starred Bradford Dillman, Heather Menzies, Kevin McCarthy, Keenan Wynn, Barbara Steele, and Dick Miller. Produced by Roger Corman, Piranha was inspired by the 1975 film Jaws, which had been a major success for distributor Universal Studios and director Steven Spielberg. It has since inspired a series of similarly themed B movies such as Grizzly.

The film involves a private investigator Maggie McNamara from Lyon Investigation. She was hired by the wealthy J.R. Randolph to find his niece, who disappeared with her boyfriend. Maggie seeks out the lonely environmentalist Paul Grogan to help her to look for the teenager. They head to an abandoned army facility and Maggie decides to drain the pools to see if the body of the girl is in one of them. They are assaulted by a man with a crowbar, but they subdue him. However, he escapes, and soon they learn that the man is Dr. Robert Hoak, who, for military purposes, is researching a hybrid species of piranha that is capable of surviving in fresh and sea waters. Furthermore, Maggie has released the piranhas in the river, and they are heading to the Lost River Lake Resort.

=== Piranha II: The Spawning (1982) ===
Piranha II: The Spawning, also known as Piranha II: Flying Killers, is a 1982 horror film and the sequel to the 1978 low-budget cult film Piranha. The film is the feature film directorial debut of James Cameron.

=== Piranha (1995) ===
Piranha, also known as Piranhas, is a 1995 American horror film directed by Scott P. Levy about a school of killer piranhas descending upon the bustling Lost River Lake Resort. Produced as part of Roger Corman Presents, a series of TV films by Roger Corman for Showtime, it is a remake of the 1978 film Piranha.

=== Piranha 3D (2010) ===
Piranha 3D is a 2010 American 3D horror comedy film and a remake of the 1978 film Piranha. It was directed by Alexandre Aja and sports an ensemble cast featuring Steven R. McQueen, Jessica Szohr, Jerry O'Connell, Richard Dreyfuss, Christopher Lloyd, Elisabeth Shue, Adam Scott, Kelly Brook, Riley Steele, Ving Rhames and Eli Roth. The film begins with a sudden underwater tremor that frees scores of the prehistoric man-eating fish. An unlikely group of strangers must band together to stop themselves from becoming fish food for the area's new razor-toothed residents.

=== Piranha 3DD (2012) ===
Piranha 3DD is a 2012 American 3D comedy horror film and sequel to the 2010 film Piranha 3D. It is directed by John Gulager from a screenplay by Marcus Dunstan and Patrick Melton. It stars Danielle Panabaker, Matt Bush, David Koechner, Chris Zylka, Katrina Bowden, Gary Busey, Christopher Lloyd, and David Hasselhoff. Production began on April 27, 2011 with a release scheduled for November 23, 2011, but a month prior to release this date was revised to an unspecified 2012 date. The film was eventually released in the UK on May 11, 2012 and in the U.S. on June 1, 2012.

=== Future ===
Originally titled Summer of the Piranha was announced in 2017. The project was known as Piranha JPN in Japan, but retitled as Summer of the Piranha internationally with Chako van Leeuwen and Roger Corman returning to produce and Christopher Lloyd was signed to star. No film has yet been released as Corman died in 2024. In May 2026, the film was announced with a new title Piranha: Pacific Nightmare and Stens Christensen is set to direct, as Corman will remain posthumously credited as executive producer.

== Cast and crew ==
=== Cast ===
Character	Original series		Remake	Second remake series	
Character	Piranha	Piranha II: The Spawning	Piranha	Piranha 3D	Piranha 3DD
Character	1978	1982	1995	2010	2012
Paul Grogan	Bradford Dillman		William Katt		
Maggie McKeown	Heather Menzies		Alexandra Paul (as Maggie McNamara)		
Suzie Grogan	Shannon Collins		Mila Kunis (as Susie Grogan)		
Jack	Keenan Wynn		James E. Brodhead		
Laura Dickinson	Melody Thomas Scott		Soleil Moon Frye	Brooklynn Proulx (as Laura Forester)	
Betsy	Belinda Balaski		Chelsea Madison-Ciu		
Dr. Robert Hoak	Kevin McCarthy				
Buck Gardner	Dick Miller				
Dr. Mengers	Barbara Steele				
Anne Kimbrough		Tricia O'Neil			
Tyler Sherman		Steve Marachuk			
Steve Kimbrough		Lance Henriksen			
Chris Kimbrough		Ricky G. Paull			
Raoul		Ted Richert			
Allison Dumont		Leslie Graves			
Leo Bell, D.D.S.		Albert Sanders			
Beverly		Tracy Berg			
Ralph Benotti		Phil Colby			
Myrna Benotti		Hildy Maganasun			
Gina Green			Kehli O'Byrne		
Dave			Richard Israel		
Sheriff Carl			Kaz Garas		
Terry Wechsler			Leland Orser		
Earl Lyon			Ben Slack		
Jake Forester				Steven R. McQueen	
Sheriff Julie Forester				Elisabeth Shue	
Novak Radzinsky				Adam Scott	
Derrick Jones				Jerry O'Connell	
Kelly Driscoll				Jessica Szohr	
Deputy Fallon				Ving Rhames	Ving Rhames
Carl Goodman				Christopher Lloyd	Christopher Lloyd
Andrew Cunningham				Paul Scheer	Paul Scheer
Maddy					Danielle Panabaker
Barry					Matt Bush
Chet					David Koechner
Kyle					Chris Zylka

=== Crew ===
Crew	Film				
Crew	Piranha	Piranha II: The Spawning	Piranha	Piranha 3D	Piranha 3DD
Crew	1978	1982	1995	2010	2012
Director	Joe Dante	James Cameron; Ovidio G. Assonitis	Scott P. Levy	Alexandre Aja	John Gulager
Producer(s)	Roger Corman; Jon Davidson; Chako van Leeuwen	Chako van Leeuwen; Jeff Schechtman	Chako van Leeuwen; Mike Elliott	Alexandre Aja; Mark Canton; Marc Toberoff; Grégory Levasseur	Mark Canton; Marc Toberoff; Joel Soisson
Screenwriter(s)	John Sayles (screenplay); Richard Robinson; John Sayles (story)	H.A. Milton	Alex Simon (screenplay); Richard Robinson; John Sayles (story)	Pete Goldfinger; Josh Stolberg	Patrick Melton; Marcus Dunstan; Joel Soisson
Composer	Pino Donaggio	Steve Powder	Christopher Lennertz	Michael Wandmacher	Elia Cmiral
Cinematographer	Jamie Anderson	Roberto D'Ettorre Piazzoli	Christopher Baffa	John R. Leonetti	Alexandre Lehmann
Editor	Joe Dante; Mark Goldblatt	Robert Silvi	John Gilbert	Baxter	Devin C. Lussier; Martin Bernfeld; Kirk Morri
Production company	New World Pictures; Chako Film Company	Brouwersgracht Investments; Chako Film Company	Concorde-New Horizons; Chako Film Company	The Weinstein Company; Atmosphere Entertainment; Chako Film Company; Mark Canton/IPW	Radius-TWC; Mark Canton/IPW; Neo Art & Logic

== Reception ==
=== Critical response ===
Film	Rotten Tomatoes	Metacritic	CinemaScore
Piranha (1978)	72% (29 reviews)	71/100 (8 reviews)	—N/a
Piranha II: The Spawning (1982)	4% (26 reviews)	15/100 (5 reviews)	—N/a
Piranha (1995)	—N/a	—N/a	—N/a
Piranha 3D (2010)	76% (131 reviews)	53/100 (20 reviews)	C
Piranha 3DD (2012)	11% (53 reviews)	24/100 (13 reviews)	—N/a

== Cancelled projects ==
=== Piranha 3 ===
Piranha 3 was announced in October 1991 as part of a slate of films to be produced by Ovidio G. Assonits' International Movie Service in Variety for sale at the American Film Market. The plot concerned a scientist releasing flesh-eating fish into the pool system of a ski resort. The film was never made.

In April 1994, rights holder Chako van Leeuwen announced the revival of her film company, Chako Film International, to produce Spirit (later released as Raging Angels with Sean Patrick Flanery and Diane Ladd) and Piranha III to be backed by United Artists. Again, no film was produced.

=== Piranha 3-D: The Invisible Menace ===
Piranha 3-D: The Invisible Menace was announced in April 2007 to be produced by Ovidio G. Assonitis and his production company KOA Films Entertainment. In February 2008, it was announced that Alexandre Aja's remake would be produced in 3D and Piranha 3-D: The Invisible Menace was dropped from KOA Films Entertainment's production slate.

=== Piranha IIID ===
During production and post-production of Piranha 3DD, Dimension Films began developing a follow-up, entitled Piranha IIID but due to the commercial failure of 3DD no film was made.
