= White Horses of Summer =

- Directed by: Raimondo Del Balzo
- Starring: Jean Seberg
- Cinematography: Roberto D'Ettorre Piazzoli
- Music by: Franco Micalizzi
- Release date: 1975
- Country: Italy
- Language: English

Bianchi cavalli d'Agosto (internationally known as White Horses of Summer) is a 1975 Italian drama film written and directed by Raimondo Del Balzo and starring Jean Seberg.

The film is part of the genre of Italian melodramatic films known as "tearjerker movies" or "lacrima movies". It also is, together with The Last Snows of Spring, the best known and successful film of child actor Renato Cestiè.

== Cast ==
- Jean Seberg: Lea Kingsburg
- Frederick Stafford: Nicholas Kingsburg
- Renato Cestiè: Bunny
- Ciccio Ingrassia: The fisherman
- Alberto Terracina: Aldo Tavani
- Antonino Faà di Bruno: Receptionist
- Vanna Brosio: Nurse
