= Red Riding Hood (2003 film) =

- DVD cover
- Directed by: Giacomo Cimini
- Written by: Andrew Benker; Ovidio G. Assonitis
- Based on: Little Red Riding Hood by Charles Perrault and by Brothers Grimm
- Produced by: Roberto D'Ettorre Piazzoli; Ovidio G. Assonitis
- Starring: Kathleen Archebald; Susanna Satta; Roberto Purvis; Justine Powell; Simone Mariani
- Cinematography: Roberto Benvenuti; Sergio Salvati
- Edited by: Gianluca Quarto
- Music by: Alessandro Molinari
- Distributed by: KOA Films Entertainment
- Release date: 2003
- Running time: 92 minutes
- Country: Italy
- Languages: English; Italian

Red Riding Hood is a 2003 Italian slasher film loosely based on the story of Little Red Riding Hood, directed by Giacomo Cimini, the film stars Roberto Purvis as Tom Hunter, Justine Powell as Arianna and Kathleen Archebald as Rose McKenzie.

== Plot ==
At the beginning of the film different relatives of the twelve-year-old Jennifer "Jenny" McKenzie - the main protagonist and narrator - are being introduced.

- Judge McKenzie, father of Jenny is killed by a gunshot after just having been appointed to the US Supreme Court. Jenny explains that he was killed when she was still very young.
- Jenny's mother who is said to never have any time for her.
- Jenny's grandmother, Rose McKenzie, a stage actress and too busy to spend her time with the family.
- George, Jenny's puppy, friend and confidant.

Jenny proceeds to introduce her current situation, being left alone by her stepmother in a penthouse apartment in Rome with plenty of cash and unlimited credit cards. Given that setup she proclaims: "Now I know what I want - to improve my education, serve justice, reinstate truth, basically what my father would have wanted me to do."

According to Jenny, her puppy has grown up and taken the form of her imaginary friend George - a large, mysterious person with a white wolf mask and a black cloak who never says a word. Jenny and George roam the streets of Rome at night, killing and mutilating thieves, liars, cheaters and any other kind of morally bankrupt people who cross their paths. The introductory victim, a thief, is seen stealing a handbag and running off. He is eventually run over by a van driver who was briefly seen tap-dancing in the same scene.

As the story progresses her grandmother visits her in order to take her back to New York which interferes with Jenny's plans to bring justice to Rome. After her grandmother ran off to a café instead of visiting all the places Jenny told her to, a short scene shows a "blind" beggar stealing the key ring her grandmother left behind by accident. Now it is time for her grandmother to pay the price for having left her granddaughter all on her own. Jenny poisons the grandmother with her own medication in the tea and uses suggestion to "correct" her undesirable behavior. After she fails in doing so, it is time to take more drastic measures and prevent her grandmother from taking her back to New York. In one scene Jenny - an anatomy book with illustrations in her hand - tells George how to immobilize her grandmother who had been sedated beforehand. In order to avoid being detected, Jenny exploits the peanut allergy of her grandmother to shut her up by making it nearly impossible to breathe for the old lady. Once immobilized the old lady is being untied from the bed.

At 10:00 am every morning Tom, Jenny's tutor, arrives to teach her. It is revealed that Jenny fell in love with him and one morning when he explains to her that he was at the opera the night before and had to go alone after breaking up with his girlfriend, she proclaims that he could have asked her to come along. The statement that he broke up recently gives her hope again to conquer his heart.

Jenny successfully manages to avoid any attempts from her grandmother to talk to Tom and vice versa, both before and after the grandmother has been immobilized. Although the story includes more killings, they are of little relevance to the core story of Jenny, George, Tom and Rose. One night as Jenny, wearing make-up, approaches the café where she intends to meet up with Tom, she sees Tom embracing and kissing his girlfriend. Tom senses her presence and tries to stop her and explain the situation, but Jenny runs away. While Jenny was away, her grandmother succeeds throwing a book by Immanuel Kant out of the windows containing a message asking for help and explaining her situation.

As Jenny arrives back home with her eyeliner all dissolved from crying, the "blind" beggar from café scene sits at the kitchen table, obviously having finished a meal, and she shouts at him claiming she would call the police. He calms her down by explaining it would not be a good idea to do so, given her grandmother was in such a bad shape and had asked for help, handing her the book with the message. At this point it also turns out that the beggar is only blind on one eye and wants money in exchange for his silence. When Jenny offers "two hundred", he says that "fifteen" would do and she presents him with a twenty Euro note. He takes the money and continues to explain that he meant "fifteen thousand dollars". After Jenny actually presents him the cash he proclaims that this will suffice for that day and he would be back for another twenty thousand the next day.

In the next scene Jenny shouts at her grandmother for trying to get help and is interrupted by a phone call. Taking the call on one phone, Tom explains that he was trying to reach her for the last hour and the grandmother is seen trying to reach another phone in the room that had been her prison. Jenny feels cheated and accuses Tom of being a liar and telling him he would have to pay for that. When Tom asks to talk to her grandmother she dismisses the request claiming she would not be able to get on the phone, which is when the grandmother eventually reaches and picks up the phone and calls for help. Jenny hangs up and after shouting another time at her grandmother proceeds to deal with the beggar.

While Jenny and George are off to kill the beggar, Tom is seen eventually breaking into the penthouse after the doorbell shows no effect. He finds the grandmother and it is at this point that it turns out George is really only an imaginary friend only seen by Jenny and it was the girl herself who killed and mutilated all the victims. Tom calls the ambulance and proceeds searching the apartment after he hears a baseball bat falling on the floor. He eventually finds a number of drawings with wolves and a freezer with the labeled remainders of the past mutilated victims. As he rushes out of Jenny's room in panic, Jenny attacks him with the baseball bat until he is unconscious. Shortly after the doorbell rings as the ambulance has arrived. Jenny proceeds to knock out Tom for good - not killing him, though - and then opens the door, presenting Tom as the reason of the ambulance call.

After Tom is taken away Jenny proceeds to cover her grandmother's face with peanut butter in order to cause a fatal allergic reaction, thoroughly explaining all the symptoms to her. Eventually Jenny starts calling for George. After Jenny continues to threaten her grandmother's life, "George" suddenly stands in the doorway trying to talk Jenny into giving him the knife she had used to spread the peanut butter on her grandmother's face. As Jenny sees through the deception she pretends to give the knife to "George" but instead stabs him once near enough. This is when Tom rips off the mask and parts of the cloak, bleeding severely. Jenny then proceeds to explain to Tom that George was never talking and even her grandmother would have known that. As she asks Tom to give back the knife, he removes it from his shoulder/chest and threatens Jenny. That is when Jenny starts to sob, asking Tom whether he wanted to hurt and kill her and then turning to and embracing her grandmother, asking for forgiveness, and waiting for the stab. A cut concludes the scene and the story resumes six months later.

Jenny is seen typing a letter to her grandmother on a laptop computer inside a clinic. She mentions that she admires her grandma's courage to be on stage in a wheelchair and saying that those weird memories were all far away as she hears the sounds of a man tap-dancing outside. Looking out of the window she notices the van driver who had hit the thief in the introductory scene and ran off back then. She decides to punish him for his crime but is interrupted when "George" drives by on a bike to punish the driver. "George" leaves the scenery without a word and as Jenny returns into the clinic George's bike lies in the hallway and water with blood is shown running out under a nearby door. Jenny enters the room and finds a bathtub with the wolf mask floating on the water. When she submerges her head to see what or who is in the bathtub her father appears out of the water. He is all mutilated and looks like a zombie with his gun wound. The film concludes with Jenny and her father singing Que Sera, Sera.

== Cast ==
- Kathleen Archebald as Rose McKenzie, Jenny's grandmother
- Susanna Satta as Jennifer "Jenny" McKenzie
- Roberto Purvis as Tom Hunter, Jenny's tutor
- Cesare Vangeli as Dancer
- Marc Fiorini as Giovanni Tagliavini, the dentist
- Justine Powell as Arianna
- Iaon Gunn as The Beggar
- Antonella Salvucci as Maria, the dentists' lover
- Remo Remotti as Francesco Scura

== Crew ==
- Director: Giacomo Cimini
- Writer: Ovidio G. Assonitis and Andrew Benker
- Production: KOA Films Entertainment
