= Enzo Bottesini =

Italian actor and journalist

Enzo Bottesini (born in Genoa, 1942) is an Italian journalist, diver and actor.

== Biography ==
A graduate in political science, Bottesini became known to the general public as a contestant on the TV quiz show Rischiatutto, where he presented himself as an expert diver and was the second-highest-winning contestant after Massimo Inardi. Following the popularity achieved through the quiz, he was employed by RAI in the role of commentator and special correspondent to follow events related to underwater sports feats, in particular the attempts to set the world record for freediving.

It was during one of these attempts, held on 22 September 1974 in the waters off Sorrento and in which Bottesini participated as an RAI correspondent, that an incident occurred: there was an accidental collision between Bottesini and Enzo Maiorca, who was engaged in the world record attempt and already descending. Bottesini was positioning himself along the descent axis with his back to the surface, from which Maiorca descended, could not see the obstacle and ended up with his head against the tanks of the correspondent. The collision caused the interruption of the attempt and provoked a very angry reaction from Maiorca, who, re-emerging with the cry of "You don't mess with people's lives," let slip a blasphemy broadcast live on international television along with several other expletives. Bottesini apologized that evening to Mallorca, who accepted the apology.

In the '70s Bottesini also dedicated himself to cinema, making his debut with the film Amore libero - Free Love.

== Filmography ==
- Amore libero - Free Love, directed by Pier Ludovico Pavoni (1974)
- Safari Express, directed by Duccio Tessari (1976)
- The Desert of the Tartars (Il deserto dei Tartari), directed by Valerio Zurlini (1976)
- Tentacles (Tentacoli), directed by Ovidio G. Assonitis (1977)
