= Sonny Boy (1989 film) =

- American theatrical release poster
- Directed by: Robert Martin Carroll
- Written by: Graeme Whifler
- Produced by: Ovidio G. Assonitis
- Starring: Paul L. Smith; David Carradine; Brad Dourif; Conrad Janis; Sydney Lassick; Alexandra Powers; Steve Carlisle; Robert Broyles; Christopher Bradley
- Cinematography: Roberto D'Ettorre Piazzoli
- Edited by: Claudio M. Cutry
- Music by: Carlo Maria Cordio
- Production company: Trans World Entertainment (TWE)
- Distributed by: Triumph Releasing Corporation
- Release date: 22 March 1989
- Running time: 96 min.
- Countries: United States; Italy
- Language: English

Sonny Boy (Italian: Il dono del silenzio) is a 1989 black comedy-drama thriller film directed by Robert Martin Carroll. The musical score was composed by Carlo Maria Cordio. It stars Paul L. Smith, David Carradine, Brad Dourif, Conrad Janis, Sydney Lassick, Alexandra Powers, and Steve Carlisle. David Carradine wrote the film's theme song, "Paint", which he performs in the film.

== Plot summary ==
In 1970, Harmony, a small town in New Mexico, is run by a small-time crime boss named Slue, who accepts the delivery of a Lincoln Continental car stolen by his henchman Weasel, who brings it after killing a couple who was travelling with their child. When the crime boss finds the couple's baby in the backseat he wants to kill him, but he is stopped by his transvestite “wife”, Pearl. Slue decides to keep the baby - which Pearl names “Sonny Boy” - but he cuts out the boy’s tongue and raises him as a mute accomplice in their crimes, training and treating him like a wild dog, and sending Sonny Boy to kill anyone who wants to steal from or opposes Slue's grip over the town. When the grown Sonny Boy escapes and tries to make contact with the outside world, the attention he draws to his warped family results in darkly-humored mayhem.

== Production and music ==
The opening song, "Paint" a.k.a "Maybe It Ain’t" was written and performed by David Carradine.

== Cast ==
- David Carradine as Pearl
- Paul L. Smith as Slue
- Brad Dourif as Weasel
- Conrad Janis as Doc Bender
- Sydney Lassick as Charlie P.
- Savina Gersak as Sandy
- Alexandra Powers as Rose
- Michael Boston as Sonny Boy (as Michael Griffin)
- Steve Carlisle as Sheriff
- Steve Ingrassia as Deputy
- Stephen Lee Davis as Bart
- Robert Broyles as Mayor
- Jeff Bergquist as Father Owen
- Dalene Young as Doc Wallace
- Christopher Bradley as Husband

== Legacy ==
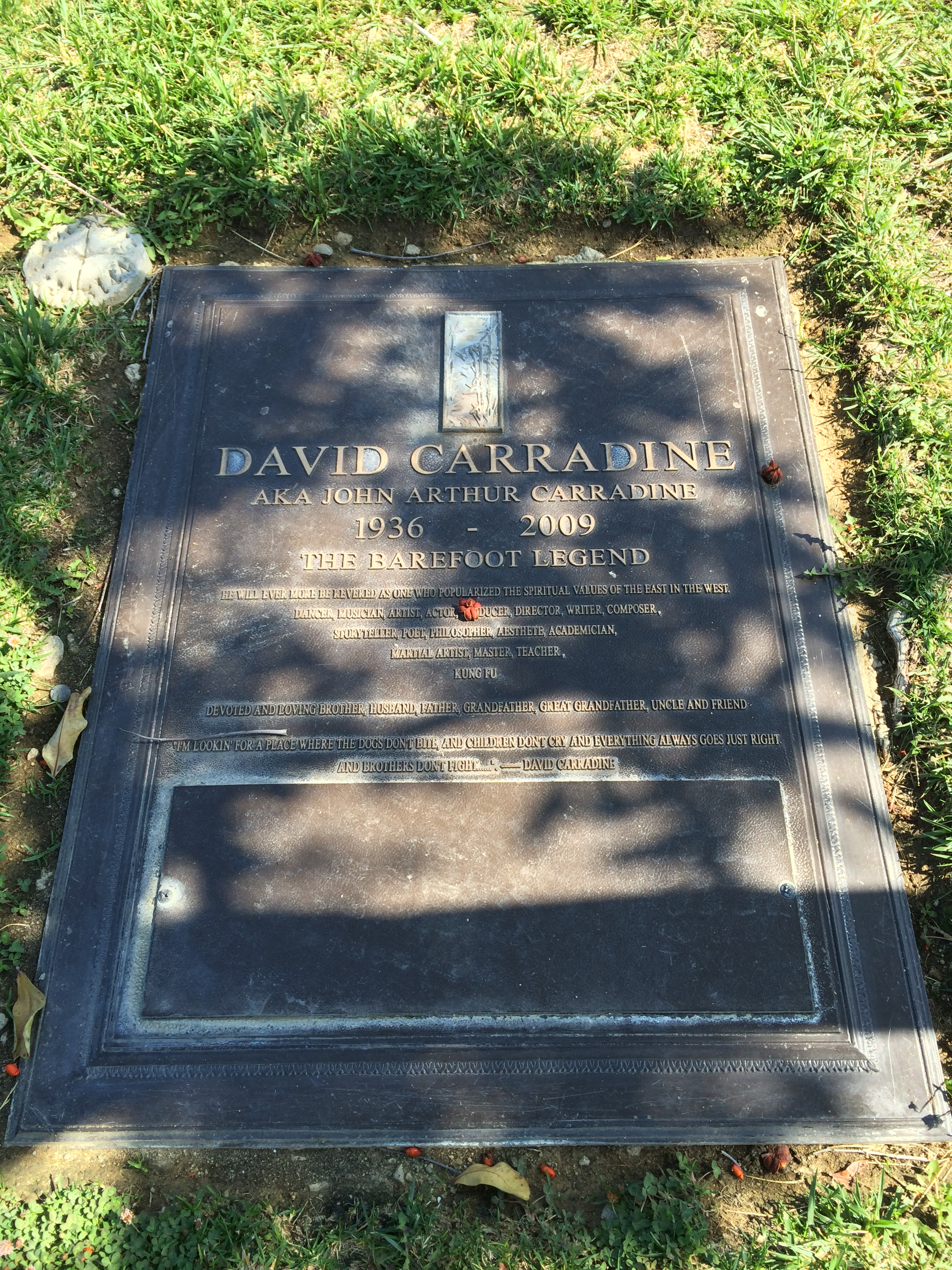
Grave of David Carradine at Forest Lawn Hollywood Hills, with the quote from "Paint": “I'm lookin' for a place where the dogs don't bite, and children don't cry and everything always goes just right. And brothers don't fight.”

Carradine wrote and performed the theme songs for several movies that he either directed or starred in, like You and Me, Americana and Sonny Boy. The first verse from the Sonny Boy theme, "Paint" (which he wrote while filming Americana in Drury, Kansas, in 1973), is engraved on his headstone, as an epitaph.

== Home media ==
This movie was released in Blu-ray format in January 2016, with English audio and subtitles, by Shout! Factory. Special features include audio commentaries with director Robert Martin Carroll, and with screenwriter Graeme Whifler.
