= Tentacles (film) =

1977 film by Ovidio G. Assonitis

- Theatrical release poster
- Italian: Tentacoli
- Directed by: Ovidio G. Assonitis
- Written by: Steven W. Carabatsos; Tito Carpi; Jerome Max
- Produced by: Enzo Doria
- Starring: John Huston; Shelley Winters; Bo Hopkins; Henry Fonda; Delia Boccardo; Cesare Danova; Alan Boyd; Claude Akins
- Cinematography: Roberto D'Ettorre Piazzoli
- Edited by: Angelo Curi
- Music by: Stelvio Cipriani
- Production companies: A-Esse Cinematografica; Cherkawy Limited
- Distributed by: Euro International Films (Italy); American International Pictures (U.S.)
- Release dates: 25 February 1977 (Italy); 15 June 1977 (New York)
- Running time: 102 minutes
- Countries: Italy; United States (Note: Tentacles is described by some sources (including the American Film Institute) as an Italian and American co-production, while other sources (including the British Film Institute) describe it as a wholly-Italian production.)
- Language: English
- Budget: $750,000
- Box office: $3 million

Tentacles (Italian: Tentacoli) is a 1977 horror-thriller film directed by Ovidio G. Assonitis and starring John Huston, Shelley Winters, Bo Hopkins, Cesare Danova, Delia Boccardo and Henry Fonda.

When numerous people go missing in a seaside resort town, reporter Ned Turner discovers that a rampaging giant octopus is terrorizing the coast. While marine biologist Will Gleason attempts to stop the octopus before more tourists fall victim to the creature, it appears that a corporation may be connected to the cephalopod's murderous behavior.

Although the film was intended to cash in on the success of Jaws, Tentacles also bears numerous resemblances to the 1955 science fiction giant monster horror film It Came from Beneath the Sea.

== Plot ==
People are turning up dead at Solana Beach, a seaside tourist resort, their skeletons picked clean of flesh and bone marrow. The local sheriff Douglas Robards has no leads, but newspaper reporter Ned Turner suspects the construction of an underwater tunnel by the Trojan company, owned by Mr. Whitehead. Whitehead threatens Turner to leave it alone, but after several more deaths, he interrogates killer whale trainer and marine expert Will Gleason.

When two of Gleason's divers are also killed, Gleason goes to investigate for himself and determines the attacks are the result of Trojan using ultrasonic drilling techniques with which the sound waves have been "above regulated levels", which maddens a giant octopus, causing it to attack and devour human swimmers and boaters whenever it feels similar frequencies. Criticizing him for risking his life, his wife Vicky joins her sister Judy at the pool. When Judy goes on a boating expedition and also goes missing, Vicky goes in search and is also killed by the octopus.

In the meantime, Turner's sister Tillie has taken her young son Tommy and his best friend, Jamie to a boating race, which is attacked by the octopus and from which only Jamie is killed. Meanwhile, Gleason and his diving buddy, Mike vow to kill the octopus. Mike brings along his trained killer whales out to where Vicky was killed. After wounding and angering the octopus with spear guns in his underwater cave, Mike is trapped by the collapse of the coral reef. Gleason is able to save Mike his pair of killer whales attack and tear apart the octopus. The octopus is mortally wounded and sinks to the bottom while the orcas and the two divers go to the surface.

== Cast ==
- John Huston as Ned Turner
- Shelley Winters as Tillie Turner
- Bo Hopkins as Will Gleason
- Henry Fonda as Mr. Whitehead
- Delia Boccardo as Vicky Gleason
- Cesare Danova as John Corey
- Claude Akins as Sheriff Douglas Robards
- Enzo Bottesini (credited as Alan Boyd) as Mike
- Sherry Buchanan as Judy
- Franco Diogene as Chuck
- Marc Fiorini as Don
- Leonard Lightfoot as Deputy Wilson
- Alessandro Poggi as Tommy Turner

== Production ==
Tentacles was produced to capitalize on the success of Steven Spielberg's Jaws, and as such was produced on a much smaller budget of $750,000.

The initial script was much more comedic and satirized the "killer animal" subgenre, but after executive producer Samuel Z. Arkoff had his writer Steven W. Carabatsos retool it, it became much more serious.

=== Casting ===
The lead actors were American, while the supporting cast was mostly Italian. Ovidio G. Assonitis' first choice to play the lead role Ned Turner was John Wayne. Wayne accepted the role, but after Assonitis met him at his home in Texas, he realized the actor was far too ill to play the part (Wayne would ultimately die of cancer in June 1979).

Assonitis turned to Henry Fonda, who had recently appeared in a string of Italian productions. However, the actor suffered a heart attack shortly before filming. Since Fonda had already taken a large advance, he was given the supporting role of Mr. Whitehead, while John Huston replaced Fonda in the lead role. Assonitis and Huston got along so well that the former subsequently cast him in another lead role, in The Visitor (1979).

For the U.S. release, several cast and crew adopted "American"-sounding aliases, including director Ovidio G. Assonitis (as "Oliver Hellman"), composer Stelvio Cipriani ("S.W. Cipriani"), editor Angelo Curi ("A.J. Curi") and actor Enzo Bottesini ("Alan Boyd").

=== Filming ===
Filming took place on location in Atlanta, Georgia (where Assonitis would later shoot The Visitor and Madhouse), and Oceanside, Pismo Beach, and San Diego, California. The aquarium sequences were shot at Marineland of the Pacific in Los Angeles County. The underwater sequences were shot in Italy. Initially storyboarded was a sequence in which the octopus destroys the Golden Gate Bridge, but the sequence was cut due to time and budgetary constraints. During filming, the production lost the large rubber octopus in the sea, so the rest of the film was shot with a diver waving the only remaining tentacle.

=== Music ===
The film's score was done by Italian composer Stelvio Cipriani, who scored the similarly Jaws-inspired films The Great Alligator and Piranha II: The Spawning around the same time.

== Release ==
The film was released theatrically by Euro International Films in Italy on February 25, 1977. In the United States, the film was distributed by American International Pictures, opening in New York on August 3, 1977, and in Los Angeles on August 31, 1977.

=== Home media ===
The film was released on CED Videodisc in 1982. The film was released on DVD by MGM in 2005 as part of their Midnite Movies series. The disc was a double feature release, pairing the film with Empire of the Ants. It was released on Blu-ray by Kino Lorber in April 2022.

== Reception ==
=== Box office ===
The film was a box office success, grossing $3,000,000.

=== Critical response ===
On Rotten Tomatoes, the film holds an approval rating of 0% based on seven reviews, with a weighted average rating of 2.6 out of 10.

Contemporary reviews were also negative. Lawrence Van Gelder of The New York Times called it "an all-too-familiar giant octopus movie" that suffered from "atrocious acting in minor roles", "occasionally poor dubbing" and "a totally unoriginal story". Variety noted that although "John Huston, Shelley Winters and Henry Fonda may bolster prospects", they "are all squandered in this one, thanks to a leaden script plus wooden direction by Oliver Hellman (who's also producer Ovidio Assonitiz)". Linda Gross of the Los Angeles Times dismissed it as "a tedious movie, nightmarishly slow and intermittently out of synch". Tom Milne of The Monthly Film Bulletin declared: "A devastatingly silly rehash of the Jaws formula, atrociously scripted, stiltedly acted, and reaching its low point in a grotesquely maudlin finale where the hero pours his heart out in a pep talk to the whales he has trained to graduate standards of communication." Marjorie Bilbow of Screen International wrote, "The special effects are good and there is a fair amount of suspense before each victim is tentacled. But involvement with the characters is minimal ... the excitement lies only in anticipating when the next plastic victim will get nabbed."

== See also ==
- List of killer octopus films

== Bibliography ==
- Willis, Donald, ed. (1985). Variety's Complete Science Fiction Reviews. Garland Publishing Inc. ISBN 9780824062637.
