= Piranha (1995 film) =

1995 film

- Genre: Horror
- Based on: Piranha by John Sayles
- Screenplay by: Alex Simon
- Story by: Richard Robinson; John Sayles
- Directed by: Scott P. Levy
- Starring: Alexandra Paul; William Katt; Darleen Carr; Mila Kunis; Soleil Moon Frye; James Karen
- Music by: Christopher Lennertz
- Country of origin: United States
- Original language: English

Production
- Executive producer: Roger Corman
- Producers: Chako van Leeuwen; Mike Elliott
- Cinematography: Christopher Baffa
- Editor: John Gilbert
- Running time: 89 minutes
- Production companies: Concorde-New Horizons; Showtime Networks

Original release
- Network: Showtime
- Release: October 1, 1995

Piranha (also known as Piranhas) is a 1995 American made-for-television horror film directed by Scott P. Levy. It is about a school of killer piranhas descending upon the bustling Lost River Lake Resort. Executive produced by Roger Corman for the Showtime network, the film is a remake of the 1978 film of the same name and the third installment of the Piranha film series. The film features Mila Kunis in her debut role.

== Plot ==
During the night, Barbara (Lorissa McComas) and her boyfriend David (Richard Israel) sneak into a closed down US Army test site, and discover a pool. They go swimming, but are attacked and killed by an unseen force in the pool. The next day, J.R. Randolph (Monte Markham) the uncle of Barbara, hires private investigator Maggie McNamara (Alexandra Paul), to investigate the incident, believing her to be a runaway.

Maggie searches the area for any possible witnesses, eventually stopping by local homeowner Paul Grogan (William Katt), asking for any knowledge of the girl's disappearance. He claims to have not seen her, but leads her to the army test site where they discover the pool. They enter to look for any clues, until Maggie thinks they should drain the pool. As she starts the draining, a scientist named Dr. Leticia Baines (Darleen Carr), encounters them and attacks Maggie and Paul to stop the draining, but is too late to do so. They investigate the bottom of the pool and discover a skeleton, which they believe is that of a dog. Baines steals the jeep, but crashes after losing consciousness. Later that night, she wakes up and informs them that a school of piranhas lived in the pool that they had drained, and are assumed to be headed to the river.

Paul, knowing his daughter Susie (Mila Kunis) was at a scout camp just downstream of the river joins Maggie and Paul to visit Randolph and try to convince him to shut down a grand opening of a resort just downstream. They fail, and have to make many twists and turns to try and save people downstream. On the way to warn people of the piranhas, Maggie and Paul are arrested after Randolph had claimed that they lied about the piranhas, dismissing it as "nonsense". They eventually escape from custody to warn the people of Lost River.

The piranhas first make their way to the camp, attacking the kids. Susie takes a raft and saves her friend Darlene. Susie tries to save Laura (Soleil Moon Frye) but she falls in and the piranhas kills her. Maggie and Paul make it to the camp. Paul grabs a canoe and saves his daughter and the kids. Maggie calls the resort to warn them of the danger but is ignored. She and Paul drive to the resort themselves but arrive too late; a school of piranhas having killed most of the swimmers. Randolph now sees and realizes his mistake.

Maggie and Paul take a speedboat to the latter's old workplace, to open the valve containing toxins and spread them into the lake, in attempts to kill the piranhas. Upon arrival, the control room is flooded, and Paul must swim under to it and release the valve while Maggie stays in the boat counting to 200 before pulling him out. The piranhas attacks Paul but he successfully releases the valve, spreading the toxins. Maggie starts the boat's engines, pulling Paul away from a school of piranhas. As Maggie pulls out the rope, she discovers that it was cut loose, making her think that Paul did not make it until he surfaces from the water, gravely wounded but still alive. In the aftermath, J.R. Randolph commits suicide to prevent himself from facing legal action.

After the horrific incident, the Mayor of Lost River announces that the piranhas somehow are all dead, but then at the ocean the trilling sounds of the piranhas are heard, revealing that a significant number of piranhas have survived and escaped into the ocean.

== Cast ==
- Alexandra Paul as Maggie McNamara
- William Katt as Paul Grogan
- Darleen Carr as Dr. Leticia Baines
- Soleil Moon Frye as Laura Dickinson
- James Karen as Governor
- Mila Kunis as Susie Grogan
- Kehli O'Byrne as Gina Green
- Richard Israel as Dave
- Kaz Garas as Sheriff Carl
- Leland Orser as Terry Wechsler
- Ben Slack as Earl Lyon
- James E. Brodhead as Jack
- Monte Markham as J.R. Randolph
- Lorissa McComas as Barbara Randolph

== Production ==
Rather than shoot new special effects for the film, executive producer Roger Corman recycled the special effects from the original. The screenplay is nearly identical to that of the original, but removes all of the humor and comedy. The original film's director, Joe Dante and producer, Jon Davidson, expressed a dislike for the film in the audio commentary on the DVD for the original.
