= Madhouse (1981 film) =

Italian slasher film by Ovidio G. Assonitis

- 1987 U.S. VHS artwork
- Directed by: Ovidio G. Assonitis
- Written by: Ovidio G. Assonitis; Stephen Blakeley; Peter Sheperd; Roberto Gandus
- Produced by: Ovidio G. Assonitis; Peter Sheperd
- Starring: Trish Everly; Michael Macrae; Dennis Robertson; Allison Biggers
- Cinematography: Roberto D'Ettorre Piazzoli
- Music by: Riz Ortolani
- Production company: Overseas FilmGroup
- Distributed by: Warner Bros. (West Germany) (Note: Warner Bros. distributed the film in European markets, notably releasing it in West Germany in 1981.)
- Release dates: March 4, 1981 (Italy); August 19, 1983 (U.S.)
- Running time: 93 minutes
- Countries: Italy; United States
- Language: English
- Budget: $2 million

Madhouse (also released as There Was a Little Girl and And When She Was Bad) is a 1981 slasher film directed and co-written by Ovidio G. Assonitis, and starring Trish Everly, Dennis Robertson, Allison Biggers, and Michael Macrae. The plot follows a schoolteacher in Savannah, Georgia being stalked by her psychopathic twin sister in the days leading up to their birthday. The film's original title takes its name from a poem called "There Was a Little Girl" by Henry Wadsworth Longfellow.

The film features a musical score by Riz Ortolani and cinematography by Assonitis regular Roberto D'Ettorre Piazzoli. Though it received theatrical distribution in Italy, West Germany, and the United States, it was one of the many films on the "video nasty" list, a list of horror and exploitation films banned in the United Kingdom by the BBFC in the 1980s for violence and obscenity.

== Plot ==
The film opens with two twin girls—one sitting in a rocking chair, rocked by the other. The girl rocking the chair stops momentarily and bashes the face of the girl in the rocking chair until she bleeds into unconsciousness.

Julia Sullivan is a young schoolteacher for deaf children living in Savannah. She has horrid memories of her childhood, which was scarred by her sadistic twin sister, Mary. At the urging of her uncle, James, a local Catholic priest, Julia visits Mary, suffering from a severe skin disease, in a mental institution. The meeting does not go well, and Mary vows to make Julia "suffer as she had suffered."

As their mutual birthday approaches, Julia learns that Mary has escaped the mental institution. Soon after, several of Julia's friends and neighbors begin to die gruesome deaths in the house she lives in — some involving a mysterious Rottweiler dog who attacks its victims, mauling them to death. One of Julia's students, Sasha Robertson Jr., is killed in a park by the Rottweiler one afternoon.

Meanwhile, Julia becomes increasingly unnerved that someone — possibly Mary — is hiding inside her large house. One evening, while being dropped off by her psychologist boyfriend, Sam Edwards, she sees a light on in the house on the second floor, but finds no one there. Helen, Julia's friend, offers to spend the night with her. In the middle of the night, she is attacked by the Rottweiler on the staircase; the dog attacks and kills her, tearing open her throat. Julia awakens the following day and finds Helen gone. Given the lack of evidence of the attack, Julia assumes she went home early. Sam visits her and tells her he is forced to take a business trip to San Francisco over Julia's upcoming birthday.

Later that same day, Father James is carrying things into the basement of Julia's home. The landlord, Amantha Beauregard, passes by and offers to help him take a large bag; he tells her he is throwing Julia a surprise birthday party. Once in the basement, Amantha realizes she has just helped James carry a corpse; he then chases her through the house and stabs her to death in the attic.

The next day, on Julia's birthday, James meets her after work, takes her to her house, and blindfolds her as a surprise. In the basement, he removes the blindfold, revealing a table seated with corpses. When she attempts to escape, Julia is confronted by Mary and is taken back into the basement to be tied up. James stabs Mary shortly thereafter. Meanwhile, Sam's taxi to the airport is stalled by a flat tire. When his speech gets ruined, he returns to the house to get a copy and is attacked by the Rottweiler. The dog attempts to break through a door, but Sam manages to kill it by driving a power drill into its head by self defense.

In the basement, Sam frees Julia, who then murders her uncle James by repeated blows with a hatchet. As Julia sits on the basement stairs, Mary briefly comes to life and attempts to strangle Julia; with her last dying breath, Mary warns that Julia "will never be free." The film ends with Julia weeping and a quote by G. B. Shaw.

== Cast ==
- Trish Everly as Julia Sullivan
- Michael Macrae as Sam Edwards
- Dennis Robertson as Father James
- Morgan Hart as Helen
- Allison Biggers as Mary Sullivan
- Edith Ivey as Amantha Beauregard
- Richard Baker as Sasha Robertson Jr.
- Don Devendorf as Principal
- Jerry Fujikawa as Mr. Kimura

== Production ==
=== Development ===
Ovidio G. Assonitis developed the screenplay for Madhouse with screenwriter Stephen Blakely after Assonitis had creative differences with his original co-writer, Roberto Gandus. The script's original title was Madhouse, though the film was released in some markets under the alternative title There Was a Little Girl. The film's alternate title refers to the poem of the same name by Henry Wadsworth Longfellow:

There was a little girl who had a little curl, right in the middle of her forehead. When she was good, she was very, very good, and when she was bad, she was horrid.

=== Casting ===
Trish Everly, a former wife of one of The Everly Brothers, was cast in the lead role of Julia Sullivan. The majority of the cast, including Allison Biggers, was made up of stage actors. Dennis Robertson, who portrays Father James, had previously worked in television.

=== Filming ===
Principal photography of Madhouse took place in Savannah, Georgia in the notorious Kehoe House, which has a reputation for being haunted. The budget of the film was around $2 million.

== Release ==
Madhouse was released theatrically under the title There Was a Little Girl in Italy on March 4, 1981. It was subsequently distributed theatrically in West Germany in November 1981 through Warner Bros., who owned distribution rights to the film in European markets.

=== Home media ===
The film was re-titled Madhouse for the video market, was released several times on video. A truncated version was released on VHS in the United States by Virgin Vision, discontinued and then released again in 1989.

The film's graphic content resulted in it being classified as a "video nasty" by the BBFC, and the film never saw a theatrical release in the United Kingdom. It was released in the UK in its uncut form in January 1983 on VHS by Medusa Home Video before being pulled from circulation during the "video nasty" panic in November 1983.

In 2004, the film was passed by the BBFC and was released uncut on DVD by Film 2000, and was released in the U.S. by Dark Sky Films in 2008. In June 2017, the film was released in the United States and United Kingdom in a Blu-ray & DVD combination package from Arrow Films, featuring a new 4K restoration of the original film elements.

== Reception ==
Mick Martin and Marsha Porter of the DVD and Video Guide awarded the film three out of five stars, noting: "Although the story sounds simple, there are some surprises. Stylishly filmed and well acted, with a bigger budget this might have been a classic. As it is, it's worth a look."

Ian Jane of DVD Talk wrote: "Despite the ridiculousness of the script and the mediocrity of the acting, Madhouse has enough gore and ludicrous set pieces to make it worth a look for slasher fans." Tom Becker of DVD Verdict opined, "Little touches of audacity notwithstanding, Madhouse ends up being a mediocre chiller with some unintentional laughs."

Jim Harper commented "The buildup is far more successful than the climax, which will leave most viewers disappointed. The annoying musical score by Riz Ortolani.....makes far too much use of cliched nursery rhyme melodies." He said most gore fans seek out the film simply because of the splatter sequence in which a power drill is used to kill a dog.

== Sources ==
- Ercolani, Eugenio (2023). Darkening the Italian Screen II: Interviews with Genre and Exploitation Directors Who Debuted in the 1970s. Jefferson, North Carolina: McFarland. ISBN 978-1-476-69036-0.
- Harper, Jim (2005). Italian Horror. Baltimore, Maryland: Luminary Press. ISBN 978-1-887-66455-4.
- Chibnail, Steve; Petley, Julian; Kermode, Mark, eds. (2002). British Horror Cinema. London, England: Routledge. ISBN 978-0-415-23003-2.
- Martin, Mick; Porter, Marsha (2004). DVD and Video Guide 2005. New York City, New York: Ballantine Books. ISBN 978-0-345-44995-5.
- McKenna, Mark (2020). Nasty Business: The Market and Distribution of the Video Nasties. Edinburgh, Scotland: Edinburgh University Press. ISBN 978-1-474-45110-9.
- Willis, Donald C. (1997). Horror and Science Fiction Films IV. Lanham, Maryland: Scarecrow Press. ISBN 978-0-810-83055-4.
