= Piranha II: The Spawning =

1982 horror film by James Cameron

- Theatrical release poster (drawing by James Cameron)
- Directed by: James Cameron
- Screenplay by: Charles H. Eglee; James Cameron
- Produced by: Chako van Leuwen; Jeff Schechtman
- Starring: Tricia O'Neil; Steve Marachuk; Lance Henriksen; Ted Richert; Ricky G. Paull; Leslie Graves
- Cinematography: Roberto D'Ettorre Piazzoli
- Edited by: Roberto Silvi
- Music by: Stelvio Cipriani
- Production company: Chako Film Company; Brouwersgracht Investments
- Distributed by: Saturn International Pictures (U.S.); Columbia Pictures (International)
- Release dates: August 14, 1982 (Italy); November 5, 1982 (United States)
- Running time: 95 minutes
- Countries: The Netherlands; Italy
- Languages: English; Italian
- Budget: $145,786

Piranha II: The Spawning (subtitled Flying Killers internationally) is a 1982 monster film directed by James Cameron in his feature directorial debut. It is the sequel to Piranha (1978), and the second installment in the Piranha film series. The screenplay was written by Cameron and Charles H. Eglee under the shared pseudonym "H.A. Milton". It stars Tricia O'Neil, Lance Henriksen, Steve Marachuk, Ted Richert, Ricky Paull Goldin, and Leslie Graves; no crew or cast members from the original film returned. The film is an international co-production between Netherlands and Italy.

Cameron, previously a special effects artist for Roger Corman, was hired as director after executive producer Ovidio G. Assonitis fired his predecessor. The production was fraught with difficulties, as Assonitis exerted heavy creative control, hired an Italian crew that did not speak English, and prevented Cameron from participating in editing.

Both a critical failure and a box office bomb, Piranha II was largely disowned by Cameron, who attempted to have his name removed from official credits and prefers to refer to The Terminator (1984) as his first feature-length film as director.

== Plot ==
A Caribbean coastal resort, Hotel Elysium, is menaced by a series of vicious marine animal attacks from a nearby sunken shipwreck. Diving instructor Anne Kimbrough's student is one of the victims, but her estranged police officer husband Steve refuses to let her see the corpse. While she knows what did not cause the death, she does not know what did, either. Soon after, two women and a man are killed by piranhas, which have developed the ability to fly.

Concerned, Anne finds that she is frequently bothered by tourist Tyler Sherman and decides to take him with her to the morgue to look at the body. She reveals that she studied marine biology, which explains why she could tell Steve that it was not a shark or barracuda that was responsible earlier. A nurse comes in and kicks them out, unaware that a piranha is hiding in the body. It kills the nurse and escapes through a window.

In her hurry, Anne left her credit card behind at the scene. Anne and Tyler have a one-night stand. In the morning, she begins to study the pictures of the corpse and is horrified by what she discovers. Steve arrives, throwing the card at her, angry that she went to the morgue and that she has a man in her bed. She tries to warn him of what she has discovered, but he ignores her.

Anne then tries to cancel the diving sessions, which leads to her manager firing her. Attempting to capture one as proof of the incoming threat, she is intercepted by Tyler, who informs her that he is a biochemist and member of a team that has developed the ultimate weapon: a specimen of genetically modified piranha capable of flying. He explains that earlier, his team lost a cylinder full of these fish in the water.

Gabby provides the proof Anne needs to Steve, showing him they are a danger, as they are now eating each other. Anne tries her best to reason with the manager at a meeting, to no avail. Steve provides a piranha wing as evidence. Steve tells her she cannot trust Tyler because the army says he is crazy.

Later, a piranha attacks Gabby's son and kills him, leaving Gabby to vow revenge. Anne tries to dissuade him, but fails. Having ignored Anne's advice, the manager, Raoul, hosts a nighttime fish party to capture grunion. Unfortunately for the residents, the piranhas join the hunt. Anne gets a man named Aaron to patrol the beach, but he is lured to the sea, where the piranhas kill him. During the fishing party promoted by the resort, the piranhas fly out of the water and attack the guests. Anne leads the survivors into the hotel, where they shut the doors and windows. Gabby tries to attack the flying piranhas, but they easily overwhelm and kill him.

In the morning, the piranhas leave because they do not like the light. Tyler and Anne decide to undertake Gabby's plan and blow up the ship to kill the predators. Meanwhile, Anne and Steve's son Chris has been hired, against their wishes, by a local ship captain, Captain Dumont, and his daughter Allison. They sail away and strand themselves on an island. They get lost at sea and try to set sail again, heading straight toward the wreck.

When Chris and Allison are stranded in a raft above the shipwreck, Anne and Tyler arrive in a motorboat and dive down to the wreck to plant the timer charges that Gabby left behind. With only 10 minutes to escape the wreck before the bomb explodes, Anne and Tyler are trapped in one of the sunken ship's rooms by the murderous piranha, who all return to the wreck. Steve, piloting a police helicopter, ditches the chopper and swims to Anne and Tyler's motorboat, where Chris and Allison are. Steve powers up the boat and takes off. Tyler gets stuck in the wreck and is eaten by the piranhas. Anne escapes out of a porthole, then grabs the anchor, allowing herself to be pulled away by the motorboat on the surface. The bomb detonates, destroying the sunken ship and all the piranhas with it. With all the piranhas dead, Anne swims to the surface and is picked up by Steve, Chris, and Allison in their boat.

== Cast ==
- Tricia O'Neil as Anne Kimbrough
- Steve Marachuk as Tyler Sherman
- Lance Henriksen as Steve Kimbrough
- Ricky Paull Goldin as Chris Kimbrough (credited as 'Ricky G. Paull')
- Ted Richert as Raoul
- Leslie Graves as Allison Dumont
- Albert Sanders as Leo Bell
- Tracy Berg as Beverly
- Phil Colby as Ralph Benotti
- Hildy Maganasun as Myrna Benotti
- Carole Davis as Jai
- Connie Lynn Hadden as Loretta
- Anne Pollack as Mrs. Wilson
- Arnie Ross as Mal
- Lee Krug as Ronny
- Sally Ricca as Cindy
- Phil Mullins as Phil
- Kidd Brewer Jr. as Lou
- Jan Eisner Mannon as Lisa
- Ancil Gloudon as Gabby
- Paul Drummond as Frank
- Stevie Cox as Frank Jr.

== Production ==
=== Development and writing ===
After the financial success of Joe Dante's Piranha, producers Jeff Schechtman and Chako van Leuwen immediately began work on a sequel. Roger Corman, the head of New World Pictures which had produced and released the first film, did not share either person's interest, instead focusing on his own "underwater horror" film Humanoids from the Deep. Corman sold the sequel rights to Schechtman and van Leuwen, who developed a script with writers Charles H. Eglee and Channing Gibson, based on a treatment by longtime New World producer Martin B. Cohen.

Because Dante was already attached to direct The Howling, the producers approached Dante's former colleague Miller Drake as prospective director. Drake had worked alongside Dante in New World's trailer department and had essayed the role of "First Mutant" in Dante's directorial debut, Hollywood Boulevard – before becoming Corman's de facto head of post-production. With a tentative director in place, the producers' sought financing and struck a deal with Greco-Italian filmmaker Ovidio G. Assonitis, who had produced and directed several successful low-budget "cash-in" films aimed at the American import market. The filmmaker had previously directed the 1974 supernatural horror movie Beyond the Door, a film that prompted Warner Bros. to file suit for copyright infringement because of its alleged similarity to The Exorcist. According to Assonitis, the suit was resolved when he promised not to make a sequel to Beyond the Door, and Warner entered an agreement that the producer oversee three movies for the company, one of which would be Piranha II.

Drake set to work rewriting the script with Eglee, who would later collaborate with James Cameron on the TV show Dark Angel. Drake's intention was that Piranha II should hinge upon Kevin McCarthy's scientist from Piranha, even though he had seemingly perished in the first movie.

"I pitched this idea of bringing Kevin McCarthy back, all chewed up and mutilated from the previous movie," says Drake. "He was on an abandoned oil rig and he was developing these flying piranhas out there to get revenge, or whatever. I think we were going to bring Barbara Steele back and have him kill her by smashing her head through a fish tank."

Plans changed as neither McCarthy nor Steele were available, and the script was re-written as a standalone story without returning characters. James Cameron, another New World alumnus, was hired as the special effects director. Some time before principal photography started, Miller Drake was fired by Assonitis and Cameron was promoted to director. Piranha II would be his feature directorial debut.

=== Pre-production ===
The crew was composed essentially of Italians from Assonitis's previous films, none of whom spoke English. Some, however, did have prior experience on horror/fantasy movies so they were, to some extent, able to satisfy Cameron's requirements.

Among the crew was veteran horror cinematographer Roberto D'Ettorre Piazzoli (whose name is misspelled "Roberto D'Ettore Piazzoli" in the opening credits). The special effects were designed and supervised by Giannetto De Rossi, who had previously worked on the Lucio Fulci films Zombi 2 and The Beyond. The film score was composed by Stelvio Cipriani (under the alias "Steve Powder"), who had previously scored films for Mario Bava.

Lead actors Lance Henriksen and Tricia O'Neil would both go on to work with Cameron in the future. Henriksen starred in The Terminator and Aliens; O'Neil had a small role in Titanic.

=== Filming ===
The primary location for the film was the Mallards Beach-Hyatt Hotel (later renamed to Moon Palace Jamaica resort), in Ocho Rios, Jamaica, which served as the film's fictional Club Elysium resort. Most of the underwater scenes were filmed off Grand Cayman. Interior scenes were filmed at De Paolis Studios in Rome.

After the first week of shooting, the set harmony was disturbed by some discussions about the work between the director and the producers (Assonitis, asked to verify the day-to-day activities, arguing with most of Cameron's choices), so while Cameron was only responsible for the shooting, most of the decisions were under Assonitis's authority.

As in the first film, which was one of many horror films inspired by the success of Steven Spielberg's film Jaws (1975), piranhas act as the antagonist monsters harming human life, and have developed the ability to fly, which they did not have in the first film. On the Terminator 2: Judgment Day commentary track, Cameron jokingly defended the film, tongue firmly in cheek, as "the finest flying killer fish horror/comedy ever made". He would later employ some of the same mechanisms used to make the piranhas fly in the facehugger animatronics for Aliens.

=== Post-production ===
I was replaced after two-and-a-half weeks by the Italian producer. He just fired me and took over, which is what he wanted to do when he hired me. It wasn't until much later that I even figured out what had happened. It was like, 'Oh, man, I thought I was doing a good job.' But when I saw what they were cutting together, it was horrible. And then the producer wouldn't take my name off the picture because [contractually] they couldn't deliver it with an Italian name. So they left me on, no matter what I did. I had no legal power to influence him from Pomona, California, where I was sleeping on a friend's couch. I didn't even know an attorney. In actual fact, I did some directing on the film, but I don't feel it was my first movie.

— James Cameron on "directing" Piranha II: The Spawning.

According to Dreaming Aloud, a biography of Cameron by Christopher Heard, Cameron was not allowed to see his footage and was not involved in editing. He broke into the editing room in Rome and cut his own version while the film's producers were at Cannes, but was caught, and Assonitis recut it again.

In a 2008 interview on The Hour, Cameron jokingly denied breaking into the editing room, then recounted the story as a "hypothetical scenario", and told host George Stroumboulopoulos how he "would've broken into the office" if he actually did it.

Cameron was able to make a deal with a distributor, who agreed to buy his footage and allow him to re-score and re-cut the picture to basically restructure it to what was originally intended before release, so his alternative vision eventually came out on home video in some regions, which made a profit for the distributor.

== Release ==
The film premiered in Italy on August 14, 1982. It was released in the United States by Saturn International Pictures on November 5.

== Home media ==
A director's cut exists only on Laserdisc and VHS from Embassy Home Entertainment. In 2003, Columbia TriStar Home Entertainment released the film on Region A DVD in a full-frame format. In other regions, the DVD was released in a widescreen format. In 2018, Scream Factory released the film on Region A Blu-ray in an improved widescreen transfer.

== Reception ==
=== Critical response ===
Some critics called the film "abject", others opined that "the piranhas...look as though they had been remaindered from a joke shop" and that they resembled "haddock with dentures". According to Tim Healey in The World's Worst Movies (1986) the film is "a strong contender ... for anyone's list of all-time horror turkeys". The film holds a 4% approval rating on Rotten Tomatoes, based on 26 reviews. It was a box-office bomb. On Metacritic, the film has a 15/100 based on 5 reviews, meaning "overwhelming dislike".

=== Cameron's response ===
James Cameron refers to The Terminator as his first feature-length film, despite the fact that it was made in 1984, two years after Piranha II: The Spawning. However, Cameron acknowledged the film in a 60 Minutes segment with interviewer Morley Safer in 2010, referring to Piranha II as "the best flying piranha film ever made".
