= Marc Fiorini =

Italian-Canadian actor (b. 1941)

- Born: Maurizio Marco Fiorini; 15 March 1941 (age 85); Rome, Lazio, Italy
- Education: National Theatre School of Canada
- Occupation: Actor
- Years active: 1964-present
- Spouse: Lisa Seagram (m. 1971; div. 1980)
- Children: 2

Maurizio Marco Fiorini (born 15 March 1941), known as Marc Fiorini, is an Italian-Canadian actor.

== Early life and education ==
Fiorini was born in Rome in March 1941, to Antonio Fiorini and Elvira Bosca. After the Second World War, Fiorini and his mother emigrated to Québec, Canada, where they lived with his grandparents. He studied theoretical physics and aeronautical engineering but eventually decided to become an actor instead, and enrolled in the National Theatre School of Canada.

== Career ==
Fiorini was a stage actor in Canada and London, before returning to his country of birth to try his hand at Italian films. In 1968, he co-starred in the crime film Bandits in Rome, opposite John Cassavetes and Gabriele Ferzetti.

He lived for several years in Italy where he appeared in genre films, sometimes using aliases such as Ludovico Svengali, Matt Silence, Mark Farran and Ashborn Hamilton Jr. In 1969, while playing the main villain in the Spaghetti Western The Reward's Yours... The Man's Mine, he met expatriate American actress Lisa Seagram, whom he later married.

Fiorini later relocated to North America where he worked as a character actor. After a hiatus from the screen, he resumed his career in the late 1990s. He has returned to Italy numerous times to work in local productions. He played the Werewolf Syndicate Leader in the Canadian television series Big Wolf on Campus (1999-2002) and Cardinal Baggia in Angels & Demons (2009).

== Personal life ==
Fiorini has two daughters, Chela Michelle Fiorini and Alisa Hershman. He was married to American actress Lisa Seagram from 1971 to 1980. He is fluent in Italian, English, and French. He lives between Los Angeles and Rome.

== Selected filmography ==
- 1968 : Bandits in Rome
- 1968 : Kong Island (Eva, la Venere selvaggia)
- 1969 : The Reward's Yours... The Man's Mine (El Puro)
- 1974 : I cannoni tuonano ancora
- 1976 : La studentessa
- 1977 : Tentacles
- 1990 : Down the Drain
- 1993 : American Ninja V
- 1993 : Over the Line
- 1999-2002 : Big Wolf on Campus (television series)
- 2002 : La guerra è finita (TV movie)
- 2003 : Red Riding Hood
- 2003 : Ferrari
- 2005 : Pope John Paul II (television miniseries)
- 2006 : Gli indesiderabili
- 2006 : Fuoco su di me
- 2006 : The Listening
- 2007 : Silk
- 2008 : Capri (television series)
- 2009 : Angels & Demons
- 2017 : The Broken Key
- 2019 : Aquile randagie
- 2019 : Credo in un solo padre
- 2020 : Creators: The Past
