= It Can Be Done Amigo =

1972 spaghetti western film

It Can Be Done Amigo (Si può fare... amigo!)
- Directed by: Maurizio Lucidi
- Written by: Rafael Azcona (screenplay); Ernesto Gastaldi (story); Albert Kantoff (French dialogue)
- Produced by: Enrico Chroscicki (executive producer); Jacques Roitfeld (producer); Alfonso Sansone (executive producer)
- Starring: Bud Spencer; Jack Palance; Renato Cestiè; Francisco Rabal; Dany Saval
- Cinematography: Aldo Tonti
- Edited by: Renzo Lucidi
- Music by: Luis Bacalov
- Release date: 1972
- Running time: 85 minutes (Germany); 100 minutes (Spain); 109 minutes (Italy)
- Countries: Spain; Italy; France
- Language: Italian

It Can Be Done Amigo (Italian: Si può fare... amigo) is a 1972 Spanish / Italian / French spaghetti western comedy film directed by Maurizio Lucidi.

The film is also known as Saddle Tramps (English title in Canada)

== Plot summary ==
Coburn is pursued by the gunfighter and pimp Sonny, who wants to kill him for seducing Sonny's sister Mary, but not until they have married so she is made an honest woman. When they confront, Sonny usually gets knocked out. Coburn meets the boy Chip, whose uncle has just died, and gave Coburn a deed and the mission to take Chip to Westland. They settle in Chip's house. Franciscus, the town priest, sheriff and judge – who is rumored to be responsible for people being run out of the area – offers to buy the place and so does eventually a stranger who buys pieces of clay and tastes them. Chip does refuse the mounting offers, to Coburn's consternation. Coburn and Chip realize that there is some sort of treasure that everyone is after, they assume it's gold. Franciscus allies with Sonny, and they capture Coburn and forcefully marry him to Mary. However, when Sonny is about to shoot Coburn, Mary says that she is pregnant, so Sonny decides to postpone the killing until the child is 21. Franciscus protests and is knocked out. He sends his secret partner, the horse thief Big Jim (who earlier received a good thrashing when he tried to rob a bank where Coburn was to make a deposit and had his turkey taken from him in jail by Coburn, earlier in movie) to shoot Coburn. But Sonny, who is promised one third of the house by Chip, shoots off his pants. Franciscus and Big Jim return in force when the wedding party has started, and there is a big brawl. The fireworks explode and oil gushes from the well. They realize that the treasure is not gold but oil! The bandits are flattened, but Franciscus leaves together with Sonny and the whores. Mary reveals to Coburn that she lied about the pregnancy, and he sets about to redress this so enthusiastically that the whole house falls down, while Chip smiles, saying It can be done Amigo.

== Cast ==
- Bud Spencer as Hiram Coburn
- Jack Palance as Sonny Bronston
- Renato Cestiè as Chip Anderson
- Francisco Rabal as Franciscus
- Dany Saval as Mary Bronston
- Luciano Catenacci as James
- Roberto Camardiel as the drunkard
- Franco Giacobini as the man who eats mud
- Serena Michelotti as the Warren widow
- Manuel Guitián
- Salvatore Borghese
- Marcello Verziera
- Dominique Badou
- Dante Cleri
- Luciano Pigozzi
- Dalila Di Lazzaro
- Luciano Bonanni
- Franca Viganò

== Reception ==
In his investigation of narrative structures in Spaghetti Western films, Fridlund notes that while Coburn is indeed very similar to the Bud Spencer's Bambino character in They Call Me Trinity and Trinity Is Still My Name, some of the properties of the Trinity character in the latter films here are carried by Sonny (quick gun and unwanted partner) and Chip (unpredictable partner). Also, instead of the heroes helping religious communities in the Trinity films, the villain is (disguised as) a priest in It Can Be Done Amigo.

== Releases ==
Wild East released this in its uncut theatrical dramatic form on a limited edition R0 NTSC DVD in 2011
