= Over the Line =

- Directed by: Ovidio G. Assonitis; Roberto D'Ettorre Piazzoli
- Written by: Fabio Piccioni; William Clark
- Produced by: Pearl Navratilova
- Starring: Lesley-Anne Down; John Enos III; Lady B. Pearl; Michael Parks
- Cinematography: Roberto D'Ettorre Piazzoli
- Edited by: Davide Bassan; Claudio M. Cutry
- Music by: Stelvio Cipriani
- Production company: International Movie Service s.r.l.
- Distributed by: Cannon Pictures Inc.
- Release date: September 18, 1993; (United Kingdom)
- Running time: 108 minutes
- Country: United States
- Language: English

Over the Line is a 1993 American thriller film directed by Ovidio G. Assonitis and Roberto D'Ettorre Piazzoli. It stars Lesley-Anne Down as Elaine Patterson, a college professor who works in prison as a literary teacher for experiment and becomes the obsession for seductive inmate. It also starred John Enos III as inmate and rap performer Lady B Pearl as his ex-girlfriend who also sang number of songs in film.

== Plot ==
Dr. Elaine Patterson (Lesley-Anne Down) is reluctantly put in charge of a new literacy program for prisoners at a Texas penitentiary for men. There she meets handsome and untamed inmate John Dial (John Enos III) and she begins to fall for his charms, against her better judgement. Their closeness doesn't go unnoticed by up-and-coming rap artist Kandi, who also happens to be Dial's girlfriend. In order to be alone with Dial, Elaine disguises herself as Kandi for a conjugal visit inside the prison. This secret encounter is a no-holds-barred sexual exploration for Elaine, but when it's over, she knows she has gone too far. But Dial refuses to end their relationship. When Elaine leaves the literacy program, Dial takes matters into his own hands by murdering the prison warden and escaping. Now that he is out, Elaine seeks help from a detective Pearlmutter (Michael Parks) but Dial is determined to teach her a lesson she'll never forget.

== Cast ==
- Lesley-Anne Down as Elaine Patterson
- John Enos III as Dial
- Lady B. Pearl as Kandi
- Michael Parks as Pearlmutter
- Tomas Arana as The Warden
- Marc Fiorini as McBride
- Sofia Milos as Kristin
- Clement von Franckenstein as Dean Hemsley

== Production ==
The film was originally announced as Inside Out, one of a slate of films to be produced by Ovidio Assonitis after his departure from Cannon Pictures alongside Piranha 3, Alienators and Seduction. Production was complete and the film, now titled Over the Line was given an 'R' rating "for strong violence sexuality and language" by the MPAA in February 1993.

== Release ==
The film was released as Over the Line into select theatres in the United States by Cannon Pictures on Feb 25, 1994. The film was released on VHS in the US and Canada by Cannon Video later on in the year.

The film was released in the UK on VHS by Warner Bros. Home Video on September 18, 1993 and played on Sky TV a year later on November 23, 1994. The film was later released on Amazon Prime Video by 101 Films in the UK.

The film was retitled Out of Control in certain territories, including Germany.
