= Here We Go Again (1973 TV series) =

American TV sitcom aired 1973

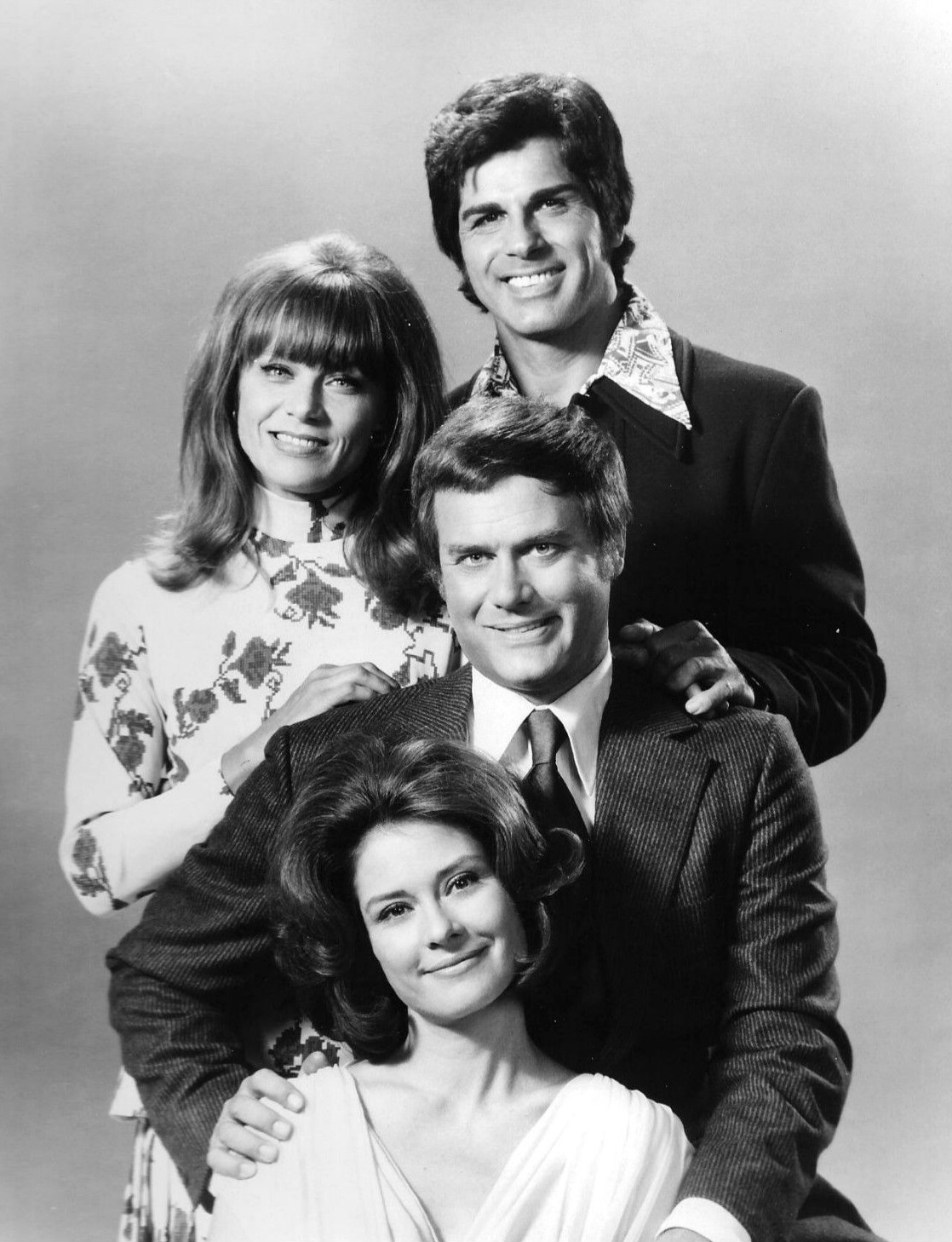
- Genre: Sitcom
- Created by: Robert Kaufman
- Starring: Larry Hagman; Diane Baker; Leslie Graves; Kim Richards; Dick Gautier; Nita Talbot; Chris Beaumont
- Country of origin: United States
- Original language: English
- No. of seasons: 1
- No. of episodes: 13

Production
- Executive producer: Charles Fries
- Producers: Stan Schwimmer; Robert Kaufman
- Running time: 30 minutes
- Production companies: Bobka Productions; Metromedia Producers Corporation

Original release
- Network: ABC
- Release: January 20 – April 21, 1973

Here We Go Again is an American sitcom that aired on ABC from January to April 1973 on Saturday nights. The show, produced by Metromedia/Bobka Productions, ran for 13 episodes. It was the lowest ranked out of 75 shows that season, with a 7.2 rating.

== Premise ==
The show portrayed the lives of two divorced couples. Richard and Judy, who have a son, Jeff, divorce after 17 years of marriage due to incompatibility. Jerry and Susan, who have two children, Cindy and Jan, divorce after a ten-year marriage due to adultery. Richard and Susan fall in love and marry. He moves into Susan's house, which is near the homes of their ex-spouses.

== Cast ==
- Larry Hagman as Richard Evans
- Diane Baker as Susan Standish-Evans
- Dick Gautier as Jerry Standish
- Nita Talbot as Judy Evans
- Leslie Graves as Cindy Standish
- Kim Richards as Jan Standish
- Chris Beaumont as Jeff Evans

== Episodes ==
No.	Title	Directed by	Written by	Original release date
1	"After the Wedding Bells"	Jay Sandrich	Robert Kaufman	January 20, 1973
The newlyweds find their bliss interrupted by their former spouses.
2	"My Sister's Keeper"	Unknown	Bernie Kahn	January 27, 1973
Susan's sister, Laurie, arrives for a visit and becomes involved with her ex-husband Jerry.
3	"When You're Second, You Try Harder"	Unknown	Steve Pritzker	February 3, 1973
Trying to prove himself that he's as good as ever, Richard challenges Jerry to a tennis match.
4	"The Basketball Tickets"	Unknown	Ray Brenner & Jack Guss	February 10, 1973
Judy and Richard face the problem of how to divide their basketball tickets for the Los Angeles Lakers' playoff games.
5	"Sunday, Soggy Sunday"	Unknown	Austin Kalish & Irma Kalish	February 17, 1973
Richard and Susan plan to spend Sunday together at home by themselves, but the plan doesn't work out.
6	"I Can't Live Without Her"	Unknown	Gene Thompson	February 24, 1973
By way of flashback, Richard re-lives the events that led to his splitting up with Judy.
7	"A Date with Judy"	Unknown	Jerry Mayer	March 3, 1973
Judy goes supermarket shopping and finds romance instead.
8	"The Tax Man Cometh"	Unknown	Arnold Kane & Gordon Farr	March 17, 1973
Jerry and Susan face a confrontation with the IRS over a 1969 tax return—when they were still married.
9	"The Times They Are A-Changing"	Unknown	Robert Kaufman	March 24, 1973
Under the influence of Jerry's new free-spirited girlfriend, Linda, Cindy's school grades take a turn for the worse.
10	"There's Boy in My Rumaki"	Unknown	Pamela Herbert Chais	March 31, 1973
Jeff takes a summer job in Jerry's restaurant and learns the glamorous side of the business world.
11	"Bedfellows Make Strange Politics"	Unknown	Austin Kalish & Irma Kalish	April 7, 1973
Richard's loyalty to an old political friend who once saved his life causes problems when Susan doesn't think he's qualified and has evidence to back up her claim.
12	"It's Magic"	Unknown	Charlotte Brown	April 14, 1973
Judy meets a former boyfriend who proposes marriage, which causes her to ask Richard for advice.
13	"Class of '77"	Unknown	Story by : Milt Rosen; Teleplay by : Pamela Herbert Chais	April 21, 1973
Jeff has to decide which college to attend, so both couples travel upstate with him to check them out.
