= Ovidio G. Assonitis =

Egyptian show business executive, film producer, screenwriter, and film director

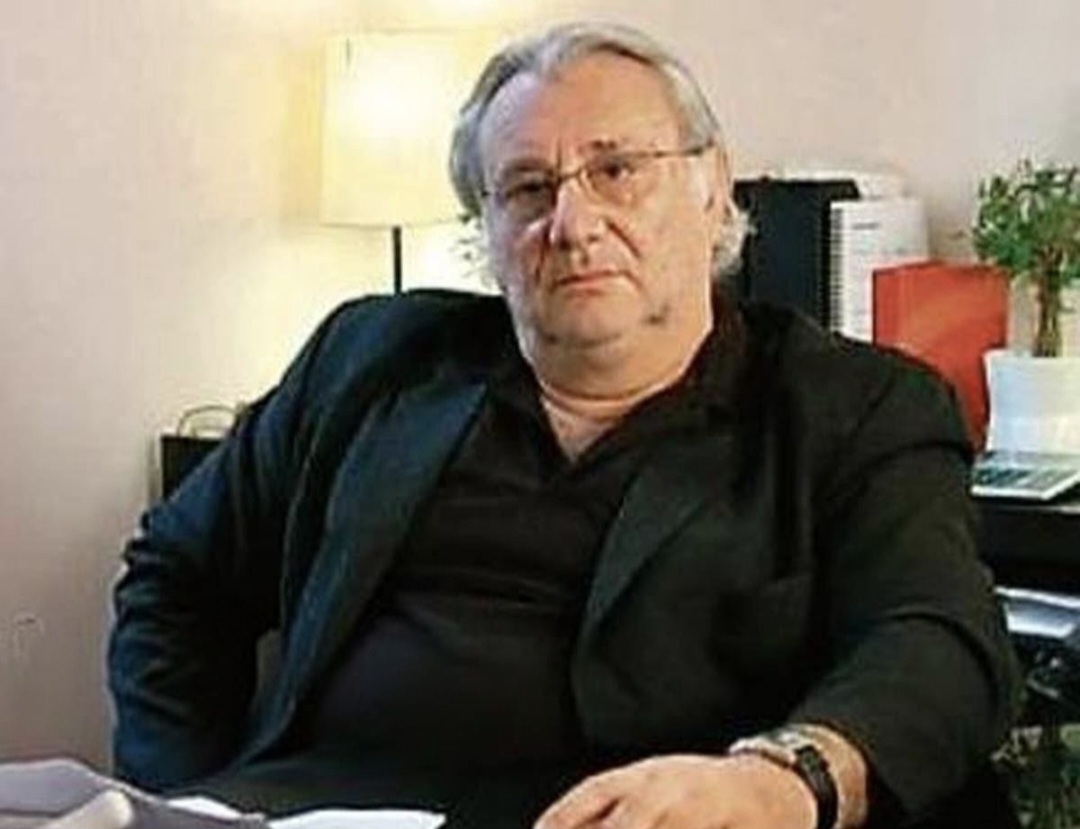
- Born: Ovidio Gabriel Assonitis; January 18, 1943 (age 83); Alexandria, Kingdom of Egypt
- Occupations: Director; producer; writer
- Years active: 1969–present
- Website: ovidioassonitis.wordpress.com

Ovidio Gabriel Assonitis (born January 18, 1943) is an Egyptian-born Greco-Italian entertainment executive, film producer, screenwriter, and director best known for his numerous B-horror films including Beyond the Door, Tentacles, Madhouse, and Piranha II: The Spawning.

== Early life and career ==
In the mid-1960s, Assonitis began an extensive distribution network company in the Far East and in the 10-year period distributed more than 900 films from offices in Thailand, Hong Kong, Singapore, Philippines, and Indonesia. His former partners and associates include HRH Prince Anusom Yukol (brother of the King of Thailand), John Litton (President of Mever Films, theater owner and former President of the Philippines Film Festival), the Shaw Brothers, Alexander Tedja, and Kong Cho Yee (of Edko Films).

== Independent producing career ==
By the late 1960s, Assonitis began producing films himself with the documentary The Labyrinth of Sex and the giallo thriller Who Saw Her Die? which was released at the height of the giallo genre. The same year as Who Saw Her Die?, Assonitis released one of his early successes, Man from the Deep River. The film and its title were mainly inspired by A Man Called Horse, which also featured a white man who is incorporated into a tribe that originally held him captive. The film is the first of the subgenre of Italian Cannibal movies that were made in the late 70s and early 80s

The following year, Assonitis produced The Last Snows of Spring. The film obtained a great commercial success, particularly in the United Kingdom and launched the career of child actor Renato Cestiè. Assonitis then tried, unsuccessfully, to purchase the screen rights to William Peter Blatty's The Exorcist. Assonitis then hired a succession of writers to create an original possession story, which ultimately became Beyond the Door. The film marked Assonitis' directorial debut, under his oft used pseudonym, Oliver Hellman. The film was originally set to be released by American International Pictures, Assonitis' long-term American partners; the film was picked up and released by Edward L. Montoro and his company Film Ventures International, it was a huge commercial success in the United States, where it earned $15 million at the US box office and grossing in excess of $40 million world-wide. Warner Bros. promptly filed a lawsuit, claiming copyright infringement due to similarities to The Exorcist.

He returned to producing with Laure, an original film based on the experiences of Emmanuelle Arsan, who wrote the original story for the film. The film was originally set to star Linda Lovelace, but due to her personal problems at the time, she was recast in the secondary role of Natalie Morgan, before being dropped from the film completely. The same year, he produced Take All of Me directed by Luigi Cozzi. and co-written by Assonitis' wife, Sonia Molteni, based on her original idea.

Assonitis' sophomore directing effort came after the tremendous box office success of Jaws, when he and American International Pictures produced Tentacles. The film included a star-studded cast including John Huston, Shelley Winters, Bo Hopkins and Henry Fonda. The film grossed $3,000,000 on a budget of just $750,000.

In 1979, Assonitis produced The Visitor. The film was directed by Giulio Paradisi and featured another all-star cast, including John Huston, Shelley Winters, Mel Ferrer, Glenn Ford and Sam Peckinpah with a cameo appearance by Kareem Abdul-Jabbar and an uncredited Franco Nero in the prologue. The film was originally a more straightforward story with a script by Lou Comici, where a child in Atlanta is possessed by a demon and a visiting exorcist from Poland is required to free the child. However, Paradisi rewrote the script to include more science fiction elements to avoid any associations with The Exorcist. The film was a commercial success in Europe upon release, but US distributor American International Pictures chose to recut the film, removing all of Franco Nero's speaking scenes and rearrange the order of some scenes, and the film was not a success. However, in 2013, independent distributor Drafthouse Films acquired the film. and re-released the remastered European cut in the United States. In the years since, the film has undergone a critical re-evaluation and now holds an approval rating of 78%, based on 18 reviews, and an average rating of 6.4/10 on review aggregator Rotten Tomatoes. On Metacritic, the film has a weighted average score of 65 out of 100, based on 5 critics, indicating "generally positive reviews".

Assonitis returned to directing in 1981 with Madhouse, but the film featured unknown actors and found itself alongside Assonitis' 1972 film, Man from the Deep River, on the infamous video nasty list, a list of horror and exploitation films banned in the United Kingdom by the BBFC in the 1980s for violence and obscenity and as a result, the film never saw a theatrical release in the United Kingdom. The same year, Assonitis was brought in by Warner Bros. to executive produce Piranha II: The Spawning, replacing Jeff Schechtman. Miller Drake, who had been hired by Schechtman to co-write the film with Charles H. Eglee and to direct the film, however Assonitis removed Miller from the project and hired Rob Bottin to direct. Bottin had already been hired to do the special effects of the film, but soon left to work on The Thing. James Cameron was then hired and rewrote the script with Eglee and Assonitis under the pseudonym H.A Milton. After the first week of shooting, the set harmony was disturbed by some discussions about the work between the director and the producers (Assonitis, asked to verify the day-to-day activities, arguing with most of Cameron's choices), so while Cameron was only responsible for the shooting, most of the decisions were under Assonitis' authority. The film was released through Saturn International Pictures domestically and by Columbia Pictures internationally and was a box office bomb.

Assonitis continued to produce throughout the 1980s with the films, Choke Canyon, an action film starring Stephen Collins, Janet Julian, Bo Svenson and Lance Henriksen about a scientist trying to develop an alternative energy source while being pursued by an evil corporation; and the Miles O'Keeffe sword and sorcery film Iron Warrior distributed by Orion Pictures.

== Trans World Entertainment ==
In 1987, Assonitis signed a multi-picture deal with Trans World Entertainment, then run by Moshe Diamant and Eduard Sarlui. The first of the films to be produced was The Farm, released as The Curse, a science-fiction horror film starring Wil Wheaton and Claude Akins, based on H. P. Lovecraft's short story The Colour Out of Space The film earned $1,169,922 from its opening weekend, and finished with a gross of $1,930,001 at the box office.The film also sold considerably well on home video. Over the next two years, Assonitis produced three more pictures under the deal: Sonny Boy, starring Paul L. Smith, David Carradine and Brad Dourif; The Bite and Amok Train. The Bite (originally announced as The Reptile Man) and Amok Train (announced as Beyond the Door 2: The Train) were later retitled as Curse II: The Bite and Beyond the Door III respectively to capitalise on the success of the previous films. Another horror film was planned for production by Ovidio G. Assonitis Productions after Beyond the Door III, entitled The Frame but it was never made.

== Cannon Pictures Inc. ==
In 1989, he became chairman the newly relaunched Cannon Pictures Inc. Assonitis was hired by Italian financier Giancarlo Parretti after the departure of former chairman Menahem Golan and the restructuring of The Cannon Group, then renamed Pathé Communications. Assonitis then green-lit several projects; Lambada, Midnight Ride, No Place to Hide, Fifty/Fifty, Over the Line (which he also directed, his final directing credit to date) as well as the sequels American Ninja 4: The Annihilation and Little Ninja Man, later retitled American Ninja 5. He also developed a project Wings with announced with Michael Dudikoff, but the film was never made. Due to financial issues at the company, Assonitis' contract was terminated in 1990, before many of his projects had been released. Assonitis sued Pathé Communications for wrongful termination of his contract. He won his suit in 1998 and was awarded $2.9 million in compensation.

== Return to independent producing ==
After his termination from Cannon Pictures Inc., Assonitis took the rights to Scent of a Woman to Universal Pictures. Universal acquired the rights and remade the film as Scent of a Woman starring Al Pacino and directed by Martin Brest. Released worldwide in 1993, the film earned US$63,095,253 in the US and $71 million internationally, totaling $134,095,253 worldwide. The film was nominated for four Academy Award including Best Picture with Pacino winning for Best Actor. Assonitis, who had originated the project and chose to go uncredited on the final cut of the film, took out a full page advert in Variety congratulating Tom Pollock, Universal Pictures and Martin Brest for making the adaptation successful and praising Al Pacino on his Oscar win.

In the mid 90s, Assonitis worked as a consultant to Ibrahim Moussa's Stone Canyon Investments. In 1998, Paul Guez bought into the company and soon after a deal was announced with MGM Animation to produce three films, beginning with Tom Sawyer and Night at the Opera, however only Tom Sawyer was produced before MGM Animation folded. The company entered into a first look deal with director Reginald Hudlin and his company Hudlin Bros. However no films were produced from this deal and Stone Canyon Investments closed soon after.

After producing Sabrina Goes to Rome for Paramount Domestic Television and ABC in 1998, Assonitis produced the 2003 Italian slasher film Red Riding Hood directed by Giacomo Cimini.

Since 2003, Assonitis has concentrated on commercial and film distribution projects in South East Asia and Malaysia. In 2021, Assonitis was awarded the German Independence Honorary Award from Oldenburg International Film Festival. The festival opened with a theatrical screening of Tentacles and also conducted a retrospective of his films including Who Saw Her Die?, Beyond the Door, The Visitor, Madhouse and Piranha II: The Spawning. He later announced a sequel to Beyond the Door entitled Embryo would be released in 2023 and Juliet Mills would return to star. Assonitis was the recipient of the Time Machine Award from Sitges Film Festival in October 2024 for his multifaceted career and his fundamental role in the development of Italian cinema since the 1960s. Beyond the Door was also screened at the festival to celebrate the 50th anniversary of its release. He also announced a teen romance film, Shadow of Light to be directed by Stefano Poda is also in development.

== Partial Filmography ==
Year	Title	Functioned as			Director	Notes
Year	Title	Director	Writer	Producer	Director	Notes
1969	Nel labirinto del sesso (Psichidion)	No	No	Yes	Alfonso Brescia	a.k.a. The Labyrinth of Sex
1972	Who Saw Her Die?	No	No	Associate	Aldo Lado	Starring George Lazenby
1972	Man from the Deep River	No	No	Yes	Umberto Lenzi	a.k.a. Sacrifice! (original title: Il paese del sesso selvaggio)
1973	Un amore cosi fragile, cosi violento	No	No	Executive	Leros Pittoni	
1973	The Last Snows of Spring	No	No	Yes	Raimondo Del Balzo	(original title: L'ultima neve di primavera)
1974	Super Stooges vs the Wonder Women	No	No	Executive	Alfonso Brescia	(original title: Superuomini, superdonne, superbotte)
1974	Beyond the Door	Yes	Yes	Yes	Ovidio Assonitis and Roberto Piazzoli	a.k.a. The Devil Within Her (original title: Chi Sei?)
1975	Abicinema	No	No	Yes	Giuseppe Bertolucci	documentary
1976	Laure	No	Yes	Yes	Emmanuelle Arsan (credited as Anonymous)	a.k.a. Forever Emmanuelle. Shadow directed by Louis-Jacques Rollet-Andriane and Roberto D'Ettorre Piazzoli
1976	Take All of Me	No	No	Yes	Luigi Cozzi	co-written by Sonia Molteni
1976	Bertolucci secondo il cinema	No	No	Yes	Gianni Amelio	documentary
1977	Tentacles	Yes	No	Executive	Ovidio Assonitis (as Oliver Hellman)	Starring John Huston, Shelley Winters, Claude Akins and Henry Fonda
1978	Last Touch of Love	No	No	Executive	Filippo Ottoni	a.k.a. The Day Santa Claus Cried; co-written by Sonia Molteni
1979	The Visitor	No	Story	Yes	Giulio Paradisi	(original title: Stridulum)
1981	Madhouse	Yes	Yes	Yes	Ovidio Assonitis (as Oliver Hellman)	a.k.a. There Was a Little Girl
1981	Rollerboy	Yes	No	Yes	Ovidio Assonitis (as Oliver Hellman)	a.k.a. Desperate Moves a.k.a. Steigler, Stiegler
1982	Piranha II: The Spawning	Yes	Yes	Executive	James Cameron and Ovidio G. Assonitis	a.k.a. Piranha 2: Flying Killers
1986	Choke Canyon	No	Yes	Yes	Charles Bail (as Chuck Bail)	a.k.a. On Dangerous Ground
1986	Lone Runner	No	No	Yes	Ruggero Deodato	a.k.a. Fistful of Diamonds and Flash Fighter
1987	Iron Warrior	No	No	Yes	Alfonso Brescia	uncredited
1987	The Curse	No	No	Yes	David Keith	associate producer Lucio Fulci
1989	Sonny Boy	No	No	Yes	Robert Martin Carroll	starring Paul L. Smith, David Carradine and Brad Dourif
1989	Curse II: The Bite	No	No	Executive	Frederico Prosperi	a.k.a. The Bite
1989	Beyond the Door III	No	No	Executive	Jeff Kwitney	a.k.a Amok Train, starring Bo Svenson
1990	Midnight Ride	No	No	Yes	Bob Bralver	produced by Cannon Pictures Inc.
1990	American Ninja 4: The Annihilation	No	No	Yes	Cedric Sundstrom	produced by Cannon Pictures Inc.
1990	Lambada	No	No	Executive	Joel Silberg	produced by Cannon Pictures Inc.
1992	Scent of a Woman	No	No	Executive	Martin Brest	nominated for Best Picture at the 65th Academy Awards
1993	No Place to Hide	No	No	Yes	Richard Danus	produced by Cannon Pictures Inc.
1993	American Ninja V	No	No	Yes	Bob Bralver (as Bobby Gene Leonard)	produced by International Movie Service s.r.l.
1993	Over the Line	Yes	No	Yes	Ovidio Assonitis and Roberto Piazzoli	produced by International Movie Service s.r.l.
2003	Red Riding Hood	No	Yes	Executive	Giacomo Cimini	based on Little Red Riding Hood by Charles Perrault and by Brothers Grimm
TBA	Embryo	No	Yes	Yes	To Be Announced	sequel to Beyond the Door
TBA	Shadow of Light	No	Yes	Yes	Stefano Poda	
