= Iron Warrior =

- Film poster
- Directed by: Alfonso Brescia
- Screenplay by: Steven Luotto; Alfonso Brescia
- Story by: Steven Luotto; Alfonso Brescia
- Produced by: Maurizio Maggi; Ovidio G. Assonitis
- Starring: Miles O'Keeffe; Savina Gersak; Elisabeth Kaza
- Cinematography: Wally Gentleman
- Edited by: Roberto Silvi
- Music by: Carlo Maria Cordio
- Production companies: Browersgracht Investiments; Continental Motion Pictures
- Release date: 1 January 1987 (Italy)
- Running time: 82 minutes
- Country: Italy
- Languages: English; Italian

Iron Warrior (Italian: Ator il guerriero di ferro) is 1987 film directed by Alfonso Brescia.

== Plot ==
Ator The Fighting Eagle returns again to the legendary realm of Dragor to do battle with Phoedra, an evil sorceress. Her main weapon is an unstoppable warrior, known as the Master of the Sword, who continuously battles Ator to a draw, until finally revealing his secret connection to the Blademaster.

== Cast ==
- Miles O'Keeffe as Ator
- Savina Gersak as Princess Janna
- Elisabeth Kaza as Phoedra
- Tiziana Altieri as Young Phoedra
- Anna Cachia as Seductress (uncredited)
- Iris Peynado as Deeva
- Tim Lane as King
- Franco Daddi as Trogar
- Josie Coppini as King Impostor
- Malcolm Borg as Young Ator
- Conrad Borg as Young Trogar
- Jon Rosser as Nekron

== Production ==
Iron Warrior was the third film in the Ator series. Executive Producer Ovidio G. Assonitis had attempted to buy the rights of Conan the Barbarian from Dino De Laurentiis to produce a third film in that series, but was unable to.

It was shot on location on Gozo island in Malta with a set previously constructed for the 1980 Robert Altman film Popeye. Interiors were shot in Mediterranean Film Studios in Malta. Iron Warrior was shot in 1985. Director Alfonso Brescia was replaced by Ovidio G. Assonitis after Brescia was hit by a car on location in Malta and had to return to Italy for treatment.

== Release ==
Iron Warrior was released in Italy on 1 January 1987 and in the United States on 9 January.

== Reception ==
From contemporary reviews, a reviewer credited as "Lor." of Variety reviewed the film on March 21, 1987. "Lor." referred to the film as lifting equal amounts from both the Star Wars and Indiana Jones films and having poor derivative music from Star Trek II: The Wrath of Khan. "Lor." stated that O'Keeffe is embarrassing, posing instead of acting and, like the rest of the cast, sticking with a funny looking punk-influenced hairdo.
