= John Enos III =

American actor (born 1962)

- Born: June 12, 1962 (age 64); Boston, Massachusetts, U.S.
- Occupation: Actor
- Years active: 1991–present
- Spouse: Jennie Lee Enos (m. 2006; died 2012)

John Enos III (born June 12, 1962) is an American actor. He played Bobby Parezi in the Fox prime time soap opera Melrose Place from 1995 to 1996, and Bobby Marsino on the CBS daytime soap opera, The Young and the Restless (2003–2005). In 2018, Enos was nominated for the Daytime Emmy Award for Outstanding Guest Performer, for his role as Roger, an Elvis impersonator and partner to Eileen Davidson's Susan Banks, on the soap opera Days of Our Lives.

== Personal life ==
Enos was born in Boston, of Italian and Portuguese ancestry. Enos attended Bentley University and Salem State College. He briefly dated Madonna in the early 90s a romance reviled by a letter that became public from M to J.He dated singer Taylor Dayne in the late 1990s. Enos was married to Jennie Lee from 2006 until her death on February 18, 2012.

== Career ==
Enos entered show business in his late 20s in 1991 when he landed a spot on In Living Color, a comedy sketch show created by Keenen Ivory Wayans. This was followed by a part as a bodyguard in Death Becomes Her, a comedy directed by Robert Zemeckis released on July 31, 1992. In 1993, he played the male lead in the thriller film Over the Line opposite Lesley-Anne Down.

Enos's other film credits include Demolition Man (1993), The Rock (1996), Blade (1998), Flawless (1999), Phone Booth (2002), Everybody Wants to Be Italian (2007) and Toxic (2008). He appeared in the films Unveiled (1994), Ripple (1995), and Till the End of the Night (1995). Enos appeared as Randy Konig in an episode of Murder, She Wrote called "Murder at a Discount" (1993) and had a two-episode role in Showtime's Red Shoe Diaries (1993-1994). He got his first significant TV role in the hit primetime soap opera Melrose Place (Fox, 1992–99), playing Bobby Parezi in 19 episodes from 1995 to 1996. In 1996, Enos starred in the horror film Dead of Night, and supported Mickey Rourke in Bullet. The same year, he costarred as Marshall Del Wilkes in the television film Raven Hawk (HBO) and portrayed Matt Conrad in Showtime's Miami Hustle. He has guest starred on television programs Sex and the City, NYPD Blue, Femme Fatales and CSI: NY, among other TV series.

In 2003, Enos landed the role of Bobby Marsino in the daytime soap opera The Young and the Restless (CBS). While working on the show, he appeared in Lance Lane's film The Kings of Brooklyn (2004). After leaving The Young and the Restless in 2005, he costarred in the TV series pilot Special Unit (Comedy Central, 2006). He appeared in an episode of CSI: NY (2006) and in In Case of Emergency (2007). He had a small role in The Hammer (2007). He was next cast in Missionary Man (2007), an action thriller directed, co-written by and starring Dolph Lundgren.

On television, Enos acted in the made for TV films Shark Swarm and Finish Line. His voice could be heard as a newscaster on two episodes of Days of Our Lives and he later played a minor role on the show portraying Elvis Presley. From 2008 to 2014, he served as a commentator on the cable television series The Smoking Gun Presents: World's Dumbest....
