= Amore libero - Free Love =

1974 film

- Directed by: Pier Ludovico Pavoni
- Written by: Adalberto Albertini
- Starring: Laura Gemser
- Cinematography: Fausto Rossi
- Edited by: Franco Fraticelli
- Music by: Fabio Frizzi
- Release date: 1974
- Country: Italy

Amore libero - Free Love, also known as The Real Emanuelle, is a 1974 erotic-adventure film directed by Pier Ludovico Pavoni.

It represents the acting debut of Laura Gemser, who moved to Italy from the Netherlands to take part in the film. Gemser was credited in the opening credits of the film and in the advertising material with the name Emanuelle as a reference to the more famous Emmanuelle played by Sylvia Kristel. The film, shot in the Seychelles, was a box office success and launched the career of Gemser in Italian genre cinema.

== Cast ==
- Laura Gemser as Janine (credited as Emanuelle)
- Enzo Bottesini as Francesco Ferrero
- Venantino Venantini as Chaval
- Olga Bisera as Katia
- Ugo Cardea as Frate Giuseppe
