= Piranha (1978 film) =

1978 film by Joe Dante

- Theatrical release poster by John Solie
- Directed by: Joe Dante
- Screenplay by: John Sayles
- Story by: Richard Robinson; John Sayles
- Produced by: Jon Davison
- Starring: Bradford Dillman; Heather Menzies; Kevin McCarthy; Keenan Wynn; Barbara Steele; Dick Miller; Belinda Balaski
- Cinematography: Jamie Anderson
- Edited by: Joe Dante; Mark Goldblatt
- Music by: Pino Donaggio
- Production company: New World Pictures; Chako Film Company; Piranha Productions
- Distributed by: New World Pictures (United States); United Artists (International)
- Release dates: July 28, 1978 (Detroit); August 3, 1978 (United States)
- Running time: 94 minutes
- Country: United States
- Language: English
- Budget: $600,000–770,000
- Box office: $2.9 million

Piranha is a 1978 American natural horror film directed and co-edited by Joe Dante from a screenplay by John Sayles, based on a story by Richard Robinson and Sayles. The film stars Bradford Dillman, Heather Menzies, Kevin McCarthy, Keenan Wynn, Barbara Steele, and Dick Miller. It tells the story of a river being infested by lethal, genetically altered piranhas, threatening the lives of the local inhabitants and the visitors to a nearby summer resort.

Executive produced by Roger Corman, Piranha is the first installment in a series of low-budget B movies inspired by the film Jaws (1975), which had been a major success for Universal Pictures and director Steven Spielberg. Initially, Universal had considered obtaining an injunction to prevent Piranha being released, particularly as they had released Jaws 2 the same summer, but the lawsuit was dropped after Spielberg himself gave the film a positive comment in advance.

Released on August 3, 1978, the film was a commercial success and later became a cult film. Piranha was followed by a sequel, Piranha II: The Spawning (1982), and two remakes, one in 1995 and another in 2010, which spawned its own sequel in 2012.

== Plot ==
Two teenagers find an abandoned military compound and skinny dip in a holding pool, but are attacked and killed by unseen creatures.

Sometime later, determined yet absent-minded skiptracer Maggie McKeown is dispatched to find the missing teenagers near Lost River Lake and hires a surly backwoods drunkard, Paul Grogan, to guide her. They discover the compound and find bizarre jarred specimens and evidence of an occupant inside. Locating a drainage switch for the nearby pool, Maggie empties it to search the bottom, but a haggard man enters and tries to stop her until Paul subdues him. The pair finds a skeleton in the pool's filtration trap and learn it was filled with saltwater. The man awakens and steals their jeep, but crashes due to being disoriented and is taken to Paul's home. The next day, as the three travel downriver, the stranger tells the pair that the pool was filled with a school of piranhas and Maggie released them into the river. She and Paul are skeptical until they come across the corpse of Paul's friend Jack.

The stranger reveals himself as Dr. Robert Hoak, lead scientist of a defunct Vietnam War project called Operation: Razorteeth, which involved genetically engineering a ravenous and prodigious strain of piranhas that could endure the North Vietnamese rivers' cold waters and inhibit Viet Cong movement. The project was canceled after the war ended, but the mutant specimens survived, and Hoak tended to them to salvage his work. Paul realizes that if the local dam is opened, the piranhas will gain access to the Lost River resort and the nearby summer camp. On their way, the trio rescue a boy whose father was killed by the piranhas, but the mutants kill Hoak before he can reveal how to kill them, and the survivors narrowly make it to shore. Grogan successfully stops the dam attendant from opening the spillway before calling the military.

A military team led by Colonel Waxman and former Razorteeth scientist Dr. Mengers spread poison upstream, ignoring protests that the piranha survived the first attempt. When Paul discovers a tributary that bypasses the dam, Waxman and Mengers quarantine him and Maggie to prevent them from alerting the media. The pair escapes, but Waxman alerts law enforcement to capture them while the piranhas attack the summer camp, injuring the children and killing Betsy, a camp counselor.

Waxman and Mengers arrive at the resort to intercept Paul and Maggie, but the piranhas attack and kill many vacationers and Waxman. Intending to prevent the piranha from reaching the ocean and spreading worldwide, Paul and Maggie commandeer a speedboat and rush to a shuttered smelting plant, hoping to use its industrial waste to kill the mutants. They arrive at the plant before the piranhas, but the control office is submerged, forcing Paul to go underwater with a safety line. Despite being attacked by the piranhas, he opens the valves, and Maggie pulls him to safety. The pair returns to the resort, where Paul enters a catatonic state. During a televised interview, Mengers spins an altered version of events and downplays the piranha's existence.

== Cast ==
- Bradford Dillman as Paul Grogan
- Heather Menzies as Maggie McKeown
- Kevin McCarthy as Dr. Robert Hoak
- Keenan Wynn as Jack
- Dick Miller as Buck Gardner
- Barbara Steele as Dr. Mengers
- Belinda Balaski as Betsy
- Melody Thomas Scott as Laura Dickinson
- Shannon Collins as Suzie Grogan
- Bruce Gordon as Colonel Waxman
- Barry Brown as Trooper
- Paul Bartel as Dumont
- Shawn Nelson as Whitney
- Richard Deacon as Earl Lyon
- John Sayles as Sentry

== Production ==
Initially the film had been given a $900,000 budget, but a few days before shooting Roger Corman slashed the budget by $200,000 in order to give additional resources to Avalanche. As Corman was preoccupied with Avalanche, director Joe Dante and his crew were left mostly to themselves with Corman not visiting the set and not even aware of who was in the movie until he saw the final cut.

Eric Braeden was originally cast as Dr. Hoak, but pulled out after a few days. Footage of Braeden in an underwater sequence, filmed before he left, remains in the final film.

=== Special effects ===
Phil Tippett constructed 76 rubber piranhas and 4 with metal teeth for close-ups in four weeks, while Chris Walas and Rob Short crafted the prosthetic limbs the piranhas tear into. As producer Jon Davison was a fan of stop-motion animation, he had wanted to use the technique for the piranhas, but it was unfeasible given the film's budget. As a consolation, Tippett included a stop-motion sequence involving a bipedal, fish-headed hybrid creature visually inspired by the work of stop-motion animator Ray Harryhausen (particularly the Ymir creature from 1957's 20 Million Miles to Earth) lurking around Dr. Hoak's lab early in the film. Davison built the armature for the creature, and Tippett would later reuse the armature during the production of the 2021 film Mad God. Tippett sculpted and cast the creature in foam latex, and animated it on a stage at Cascade Pictures animation studio in Los Angeles.

Davison wanted the stop-motion creature to return later in the film, having grown giant-sized and now looking menacingly over Santa Monica Beach, but this was ultimately abandoned. Dante later recalled, "The original concept, which was of course not affordable, was that later in the movie, our stop-motion creature would reappear on a road and would get run over by a police car. Jon wanted it to get huge and attack the town, but that was not the premise of the movie!"

== Release ==
=== Theatrical ===
Piranha was released theatrically in the United States by New World Pictures on August 3, 1978. Given the proximity to Jaws 2, Universal Pictures had considered an injunction, but Spielberg convinced them otherwise.

=== Home media ===
In 2004, New Concorde Home Entertainment released the film on special edition DVD.

In 2010, as a tie-in to the release of the remake, Shout! Factory re-released Piranha on DVD and Blu-ray.

On March 13, 2015, the film screened in a R-rated Ultimate Edition presented by Fangoria magazine and special guests Rebekah McKendry, curator Mike Williamson and actress Belinda Balaski.

== Reception ==
=== Box office ===
The film grossed $14 million in the foreign box office, i.e. outside the US and Canada.

=== Critical response ===
Piranha received mixed reviews at the time of its release. Roger Ebert mocked the "really bad special effects" and the "odd compulsion" of the characters "to jump into the water the very moment they discover it is infested by piranhas". Variety wrote that the film was "not without its exciting moments" and noted that the in-jokes for film buffs added "another dimension to a routine potboiler". Gene Siskel of the Chicago Tribune gave the film one-half star out of four, particularly objecting to the use of women and children as frequent targets of the attacks.

Charles Champlin, in his review of the film for the Los Angeles Times, called it "a swift, efficient program picture which squeezes the most out of its dollars to squeeze delicious chills from the audience." Jill Forbes of The Monthly Film Bulletin called the film "a quickie from the Corman company that can't decide whether to plump for horror, science fiction or social comedy, and plays safe with something for everyone", and found it "a lot of fun". Screen International's Marjorie Bilbow wrote that the film "works as spirited scream and giggle nonsense because there is always something happening and Joe Dante directs with a slyly tongue-in-cheek awareness of the existence of big brother Jaws".

Piranha has since acquired a cult status. On the review aggregator website Rotten Tomatoes, the film has an approval rating of 72% based on 29 reviews, with an average rating of 6.5 out of 10. The site's critics consensus reads, "Performed with a wink and directed with wry self-awareness, Piranha is an unabashed B-movie with satirical bite."

Steven Spielberg called the film "the best of the Jaws ripoffs".

== Remakes ==
Piranha was first remade in 1995; this version was also produced by Roger Corman and originally debuted on Showtime. It used footage from the original film for certain sequences.

Another remake of the 1978 film was directed by Alexandre Aja, who again worked with filmmaking partner Grégory Levasseur. The two worked on other genre films as well, including the 2006 remake, The Hills Have Eyes. Distributor Dimension Films' Bob Weinstein told Variety, "We will maintain the fun and thrilling aspects of the original film, but look forward to upping the ante with a modern-day twist." Piranha 3D was theatrically released in the United States on August 20, 2010, and is in 3D.

Dimension had been developing the remake of the 1978 Joe Dante film Piranha for over a year. It intended to have Chuck Russell, who previously reworked the 1988 version of The Blob, direct the film before taking on Alexandre Aja. Aja intended to rewrite a previous script from Josh Stolberg and Pete Goldfinger. Aja explained, "My goal is not to remake Piranha, but to create a completely new adventure paying homage to all the creature films [...] I am very proud to follow the path of Joe Dante and James Cameron, and look forward to working with Greg Levasseur to write, produce, and direct such a fun and gory thrill ride." The film's cast includes Elisabeth Shue, Christopher Lloyd, Richard Dreyfuss, Adam Scott, and Jerry O'Connell.

== See also ==
- Killer Fish – a 1979 horror film
- List of cult films
