= Tricia O'Neil =

American actress

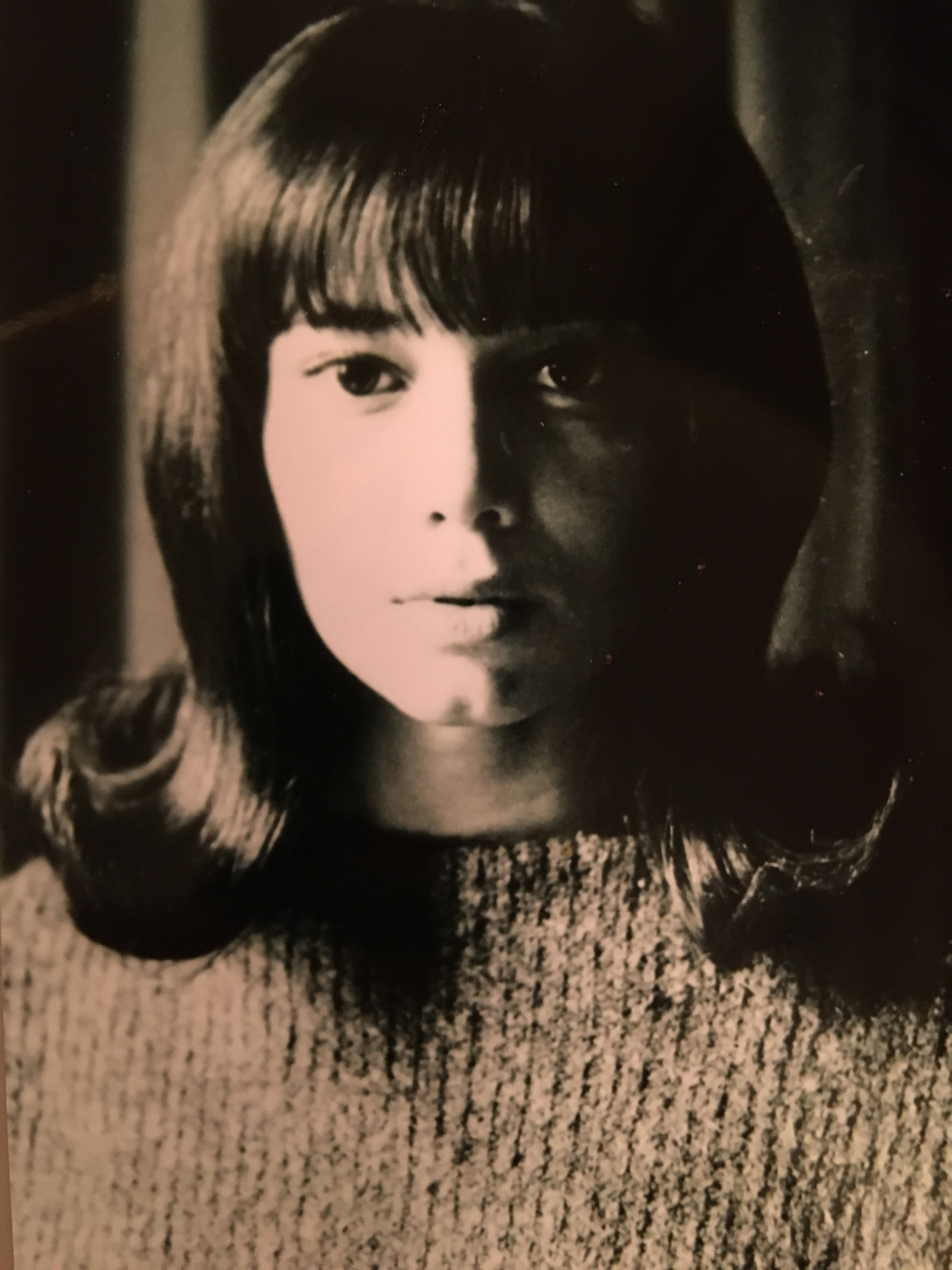
- O'Neil in 1967
- Born: Patricia Lou O'Neil; March 11, 1945 (age 81); Shreveport, Louisiana, U.S.
- Other name: Patti O'Neil
- Education: McAllen High School
- Alma mater: Baylor University
- Occupations: Actress; model
- Years active: 1972–2001
- Known for: Two by Two; Captain Rachel Garrett in "Yesterday's Enterprise ", Star Trek: The Next Generation; Lisa / Christine Ames in "Labyrinth", Hawaii Five-O
- Spouse: James Irving Van Valkenburg (m. 1966)

Tricia O'Neil (born Patricia Lou O'Neil; March 11, 1945) is an American actress.

== Early life ==
Born in Shreveport, Louisiana, she is the daughter of James Weldon O'Neil and Mary Jane Marter. The family lived in El Paso, Texas, from 1952 to 1959 and in 1963. O'Neil attended elementary and intermediate schools in El Paso and graduated from McAllen High School. In 1968, she graduated from Baylor University, where she studied with singer Miklos Bencze.

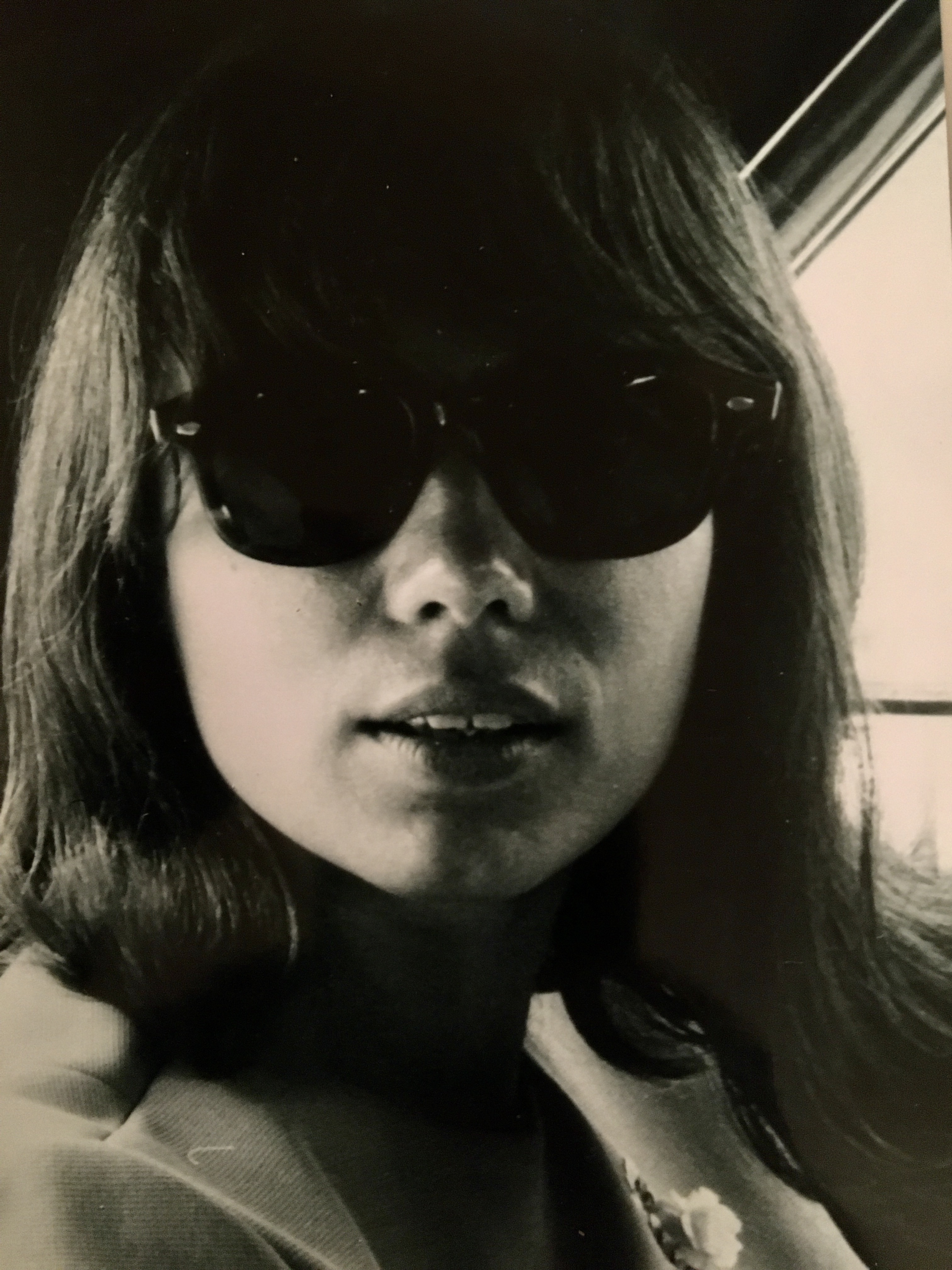

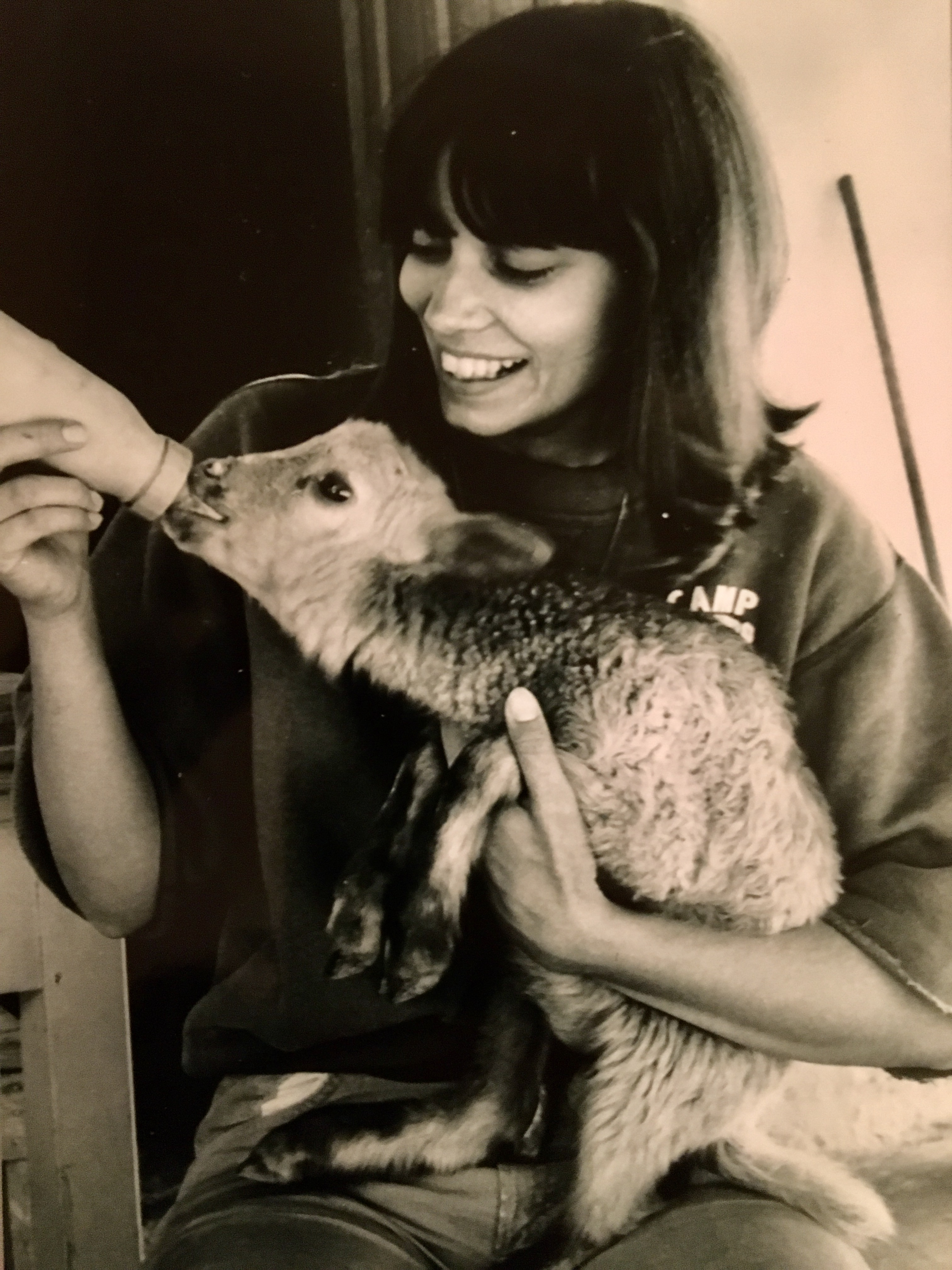
O'Neil in Mexico, 1967

== Career ==
In 1965, while attending Baylor, O'Neil performed on two locally produced TV specials, both of them airing on KCEN-TV. First, on May 14, she was one of 18—and one of three Baylor students—selected to appear on Talent '65. Sponsored by Southwestern Bell and produced by KHOU-TV for the purpose of showcasing statewide talent, it was hosted by John Hambrick. Accompanying herself on guitar, O'Neil performed "Babe, I'm Gonna Leave You" (Anne Bredon's composition, popularized in 1962 by Joan Baez). On December 24 and 25, she and the Baylor University Religious Hour Choir were featured on Christmas: Old and New, an hour-long special which was heard in Dallas on WFAA (AM) on Christmas Eve and seen on KCEN on Christmas Day.

Following her graduation from Baylor, O'Neil sang in supper clubs in Texas and California for two years before an opportunity to act on Broadway arose. By that time, O'Neil had already dropped "Patti" in favor of "Tricia", after discovering there was already a Patti O'Neil registered at Actors Equity.

In 1970, O'Neil made her professional theatrical debut in the Broadway musical Two by Two. Although the show received mixed reviews, O'Neil earned a Theatre World Award for her performance. Newsweek's Jack Kroll, in particular, singles out O'Neil, amidst his otherwise blistering critique of the show itself:

There is only one delight in 'Two by Two'—Tricia O'Neil as Rachel, Noah's daughter-in-law who marries the wrong son. Miss O'Neil is a stunning girl with a full sweet voice and the grace of an Assyrian lioness. She is the only Biblical thing in the show, bearing the wheat of Zion in her hair, the loyalty of Ruth in her eyes, the determination of Judith in her arms, the sensuality of the Song of Solomon in her throat and the curve of her thigh.

O'Neil made her film debut in the 1972 film The Legend of Nigger Charley (1972). Other film appearances include The Gumball Rally (1976), Mary Jane Harper Cried Last Night (1977), Are You in the House Alone? (1978), The Kid from Left Field (1979), Brave New World (1980), Piranha II: The Spawning (1982), Ted & Venus (1991) and Titanic (1997).

O'Neil made her television debut in the 1973 television movie Duty Bound. She appeared in a number of guest roles on various television series, including a dog trainer in a 1978 episode of Columbo titled "How to Dial a Murder", nightclub singer Julie Heller in the episode "Murder! Murder!" of The Eddie Capra Mysteries (1978), as Dorothy Fulton in Hart to Hart (1979), as a police photographer in back-to-back episodes of Barney Miller (1980), as female stunt woman "Charlie" in the episode of the same name in the first season of The Fall Guy (1981), in Remington Steele (1982), as conniving "other woman" Ashley Vickers in the pilot episode of Murder, She Wrote (1984), as a pushy reporter in the second-season episode "Catch of the Day" in Riptide (1984), as the owner of a travelling Wild West rodeo show in the third-season Airwolf episode "Annie Oakley" (1985), and separate roles in three episodes of Matlock from 1989 to 1994. She appeared in the television miniseries Jacqueline Susann's Valley of the Dolls (1981) and in two episodes of The A-Team, playing Dr. Maggie "Mo" Sullivan in the season one episode "Black Day at Bad Rock" and the season two episode "Deadly Maneuvers".

O'Neil made a number of appearances in popular science fiction television series during the 1980s and 1990s. She portrayed Captain Rachel Garrett of the U.S.S. Enterprise (NCC-1701-C) in the Star Trek: The Next Generation episode "Yesterday's Enterprise", returning to that series with a role as the Klingon Kurak in the episode "Suspicions". Later she guest-starred on Star Trek: Deep Space Nine as Cardassian Korinas in the episode "Defiant". O'Neil guest-starred in the Babylon 5 season-one episode "Believers" (1994) as "M'ola". Later, she played the Earth Alliance president in the Babylon 5 TV movie Babylon 5: In the Beginning (1998).

In 1991, O'Neil filmed her scenes in the role of Hoelun for the never-released film Genghis Khan. Efforts in 2010 to repackage the material as a miniseries, tentatively named Genghis Khan: The Story of a Lifetime, never came to fruition.

O'Neil's last screen appearance was on the television series JAG, playing Dr. Beth Salluci in the 2001 episode "Redemption".

== Personal life ==
On August 6, 1966, O'Neil married opera singer James Irving Van Valkenburg.

== Filmography ==
=== Film ===
Year	Title	Role	Notes
1972	The Legend of Black Charley	Sarah Lyons	Blaxploitation Western film
1976	The Gumball Rally	Angie - Rolls-Royce Silver Shadow	comedy film
1982	Piranha II: The Spawning	Anne Kimbrough	Horror film
1991	Ted & Venus	Judge Katherine Notch	Black comedy film
1997	Titanic	Woman	Disaster film

=== Television ===
Year	Title	Role	Notes
1973	Duty Bound	Glenn's Wife	television film
1975	How to Survive a Marriage	Joan Willis	soap opera
1976	Ellery Queen	Yvonne Danello	Episode: "The Adventure of the Wary Witness"
1976	Serpico	Grace	Episode: "The Indian"
1976	Sirota's Court	Sugar Hills	Episode: "Sirota's Car"
1977	Delvecchio	Sharon Nicholson	Episode: "The Madness Within: Part 1"; Episode: "The Madness Within: Part 2"
1977	Charlie Cobb: Nice Night for a Hanging	Angelica	Television film
1977	Big Hawaii	Dr. Ericka Bergen	Episode: "Sun Children"
1977	Mary Jane Harper Cried Last Night	Dr. Angela Buccieri	Television film
1977	Eight Is Enough	Ellen Manning	Episode: "Double Trouble"
1978	Columbo	Miss Cochran - the dog trainer	Episode: "How to Dial a Murder"
1978	Are You in the House Alone?	Jessica hirsch	Television horror film
1978	The Eddie Capra Mysteries	Julie Heller	Episode: "Murder, Murder"
1979	The Kid from Left Field	Marion Fowler	Television baseball comedy film
1979	Hawaii Five-O	Dilys Conover; Lisa / Christine Ames	Episode: "The Bark and the Bite"; Episode: "Labyrinth"
1980	Brave New World	Maoina Krupps	Television film
1980	Charlie's Angels	Anne Moore (as Tricia O'Neill)	Episode: "Toni's Boys"
1980	Barney Miller	Alex Kramer (as Tricia O'Neill)	Episode: "Homicide: Part 1"; Episode: "Homicide: Part 2"
1981	The Misadventures of Sheriff Lobo	Sheila McKnight	Episode: "Macho Man"
1981	Jacqueline Susann's Valley of the Dolls	Enid Marshall	TV Mini Series
1982	Palms Precinct	Jeanine Monasco	Television film
1982	Hart to Hart	Dorothy Fulton	Episode: "The Harts Strike Out"
1982	The Powers of Matthew Star	Fortune Teller	Episode: "Mother"
1982	Voyagers!	Annie Brown	Episode: "Old Hickory and the Pirate"
1982–1983	The Fall Guy	Charlie; Agent Eve Peterson	Episode: "Charlie"; Episode: "The Last Drive"
1983	Whiz Kids	Kathy Fairgate	Episode: "Deadly Access"
1983	Hardcastle and McCormick	Pamela Peterson	Episode: "Once Again with Vigorish"
1983	Lottery!		Episode: "New York: Winning Can Be Murder"
1983–1984	The A-Team	Maggie Sullivan (as Tricia O'Neill)	Episode: "Black Day at Black Rock"; Episode: "Deadly Maneuvers"
1984	Riptide	Tawny Clark	Episode: "Catch of the Day"
1985	Scarecrow and Mrs. King	Rita Holden	Episode: "A Little Sex, a Little Scandal"
1985	Megazone 23	Additional Voices	(Streamline Pictures dub) (English version, voice)
1985	Airwolf	Annie Oakley, Louise Mackey	Episode: "Annie Oakley"
1986	Blacke's Magic	Teresa George	Episode: "Breathing Room" (Pilot)
1986	Dynasty	Mrs. Davis	Episode: "The Trial: Part 1 Episode: "The Trial: Part 2"
1986	Kay O'Brien		Episode: "Princess of the City"
1987	MacGyver	Susan Murphy, Victoria James	Episode: "Phoenix Under Siege"
1987	The New Mike Hammer	Fran Lasker	Episode: "Little Miss Murder"
1987	Jack and Mike	Barbara	Episode: "Separate Lives"; Episode: "Come Together"; Episode: "Light My Fire"
1987	Hunter	Sylvia Brand	Episode: "Night on Bald Mountain"
1983–1988	Simon & Simon	Laura Reynolds; Nurse Sandy Purcell (as Trish O'Neil)	Episode: "It's Only a Game"; Episode: "A Firm Grasp of Reality"
1988	Police Story: Gladiator School	D.A. Willis	Television film
1989	L.A. Law	Meredith Korngold	Episode: "Captain Hurt"
1991	CBS Schoolbreak Special	Beth Crane	Episode: "Lies of the Hear"
1991	Equal Justice	Sara	Episode: "Courting Disaster"
1984–1991	Dallas	Dr. Barbara Mulgravy; Barbara Barnes	Episode: "True Confessions"; Episode: "Conundrum"
1984–1991	Murder, She Wrote	Ashley Vickers; Bibi Hartman; Lila Benson; Althea Mayberry; Linda Truitt	Episode: "The Murder of Sherlock Holmes"; Episode: "Murder in the Afternoon"; Episode: "Trouble in Eden"; Episode: "From the Horse's Mouth"; Episode: "Lines of Excellence"
1991	Jake and the Fatman	Delta Ridpath	Episode: "Every Time We Say Goodbye"
1992	Civil Wars	Ruth Conway	Episode: "Whippit 'Til It Breaks"
1992	A Woman Scorned: The Betty Broderick Story	Margaret Fitzpatrick	Television film
1993	Doogie Howser, M.D.	Acting Coach	Episode: "What Makes Doogie Run"
1990–1993	Star Trek: The Next Generation	Captain Rachel Garrett; Kurak	Episode: "Yesterday's Enterprise"; Episode: "Suspicions"
1994	Babylon 5	M'Ola	Episode: "Believers"
1994	Robin's Hoods	Lydia Barnhouse	Episode: "To Heir Is Human"
1989–1994	Matlock	Cynthia Slayton; Jackie Whitman - Model's Agent; Jackie Carol Davis	Episode: "The Best Seller"; Episode: "The Cover Girl"; Episode: "The Tabloid"
1994	Star Trek: Deep Space Nine	Korinas	Episode: "Defiant"
1995	Degree of Guilt	Rosa	Television film
1996	High Tide	Karen Donaldson	Episode: "University Blues: Part 1"; Episode: "University Blues: Part 2"
1997	Diagnosis: Murder	Jane Ellington	Episode: "A History of Murder"
1998	Babylon 5: In the Beginning	Earth Alliance President	space opera television film
1998	Gia	Vogue Editor	biographical television film
1998	Beverly Hills, 90210	Mrs. O'Lare	Episode: "You say Goodbye, I Say Hello"; Episode: "I'm Back Because"
2000	Titans	Dr. Smith	Episode: "Bad Will Hunting"
2001	JAG	Amanda Litrell; Dr. Beth Salluci	Episode: "To Walk on Wings"; Episode: "Redemption"

== Awards and nominations ==
Year	Association	Category	Nominated work	Result
1970	Theatre World Award	Performance	Two by Two	Won
