= Renato Cestiè =

Italian actor (born 1963)

- Born: January 11, 1963; Rome, Italy
- Occupation: Actor

Renato Cestiè (born January 11, 1963) is a former Italian film actor.

He was Italy's top child star of the 1970s. His best-known work was in tear-jerkers such as The Last Snows of Spring, where he would play a neglected child who, most often, would die of disease by the end of the film. Despite their grim themes, these films were successful and spawned many imitators. Several of Cestiè's movies were also popular in the UK, where they were released by GTO Films.

In his adult career he mostly worked on television. After a part on the sitcom I ragazzi della 3ª C, he retired from acting and opened a gym.

== Selected filmography ==
- St. Michael Had a Rooster (1972)
- Man Called Amen (1972)
- It Can Be Done Amigo (1972)
- Il diavolo nel cervello (1972)
- Challenge to White Fang (1973)
- The Last Snows of Spring (1973)
- Torso (1973)
- The Balloon Vendor (1974)
- White Horses of Summer (1975)
- Giubbe rosse (1975)
- We Are No Angels (1975)
- Nero veneziano (1978)
- Le nuove comiche (1994)
