= Leslie Graves =

American actress

- Born: Leslie Marie Graves; September 29, 1959; Silver City, New Mexico
- Died: August 23, 1995 (aged 35); Los Angeles, California, U.S.
- Occupation: Actress
- Height: 4 ft 11 in (1.50 m)
- Spouse: Jerry Schoenkopf

Leslie Marie Graves (September 29, 1959 – August 23, 1995) was an American actress.

== Early years ==
Leslie Graves's father, Michael Graves, was a theatre actor and introduced her to the entertainment industry when she was about 10. She started her career with a small role in the Broadway play A Cry of Players (1968–1969), written by William Gibson. She then moved to acting for TV series, including Sesame Street (1969, first 13 episodes), The Mary Tyler Moore Show (1971, in the episode titled "Baby Sit-Com"), and Here We Go Again (1973).

In the late 1970s, she left Hollywood, supposedly to move with a boyfriend to Texas, where she worked on a shrimp boat for three years.

== Career ==
Graves' return to Hollywood in early 1980 was marked by some nude photoshoots. Phillip Dixon shot her for Oui, a Playboy corporation affiliate and put her on the cover in November 1980 and again in May 1981 with a shoot by five photographers). At that time, rumors arose about her involvement with Penthouse publisher Bob Guccione and an argument with Playboy publisher Hugh Hefner.

She had small roles in two exploitation movies: Piranha II: The Spawning (1982) and Death Wish II (1982). In 1982, CBS cast her in the role of Brenda Clegg in the daytime soap Capitol.

In late summer 1984, Graves left the CBS show due to a serious drug problem and a heroin overdose, but her departure was reported as stress-related. Her last public appearance was a nude photo shoot by Jean Rougeron published in the October 1984 issue of Oui.

== Filmography ==
Year	Title	Role	Notes
1970	Mary Tyler Moore	Dee Dee	TV series
1973	Here We Go Again	Cindy Standish	TV series
1982	Piranha II: The Spawning	Allison Dumont	directed by James Cameron
1982	Death Wish 2	Nirvana's Girl #2	directed by Michael Winner
1982-84	Capitol	Brenda Clegg #1	TV series, final appearance

== Personal life ==
Leslie Graves was married and had two children. On August 23, 1995, she died of an AIDS-related illness in Los Angeles.
