= Heather Menzies =

Canadian actress (1949–2017)

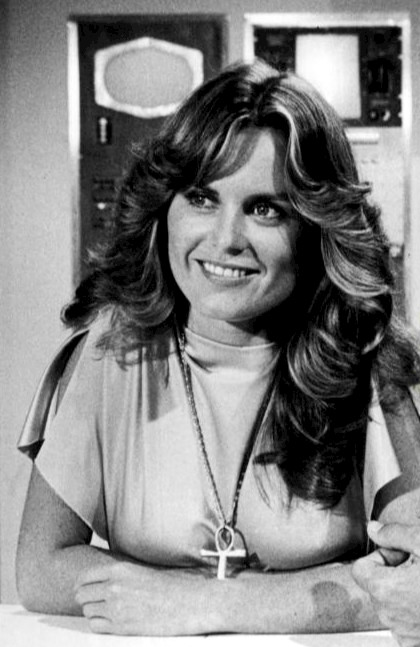
- Menzies in Logan's Run (1977)
- Born: Heather Margaret Brotherston Menzies; December 3, 1949; Toronto, Ontario, Canada
- Died: December 24, 2017 (aged 68); Carrying Place, Ontario, Canada
- Occupations: Actress, model, activist
- Years active: 1964–1990
- Spouses: John Cluett (m. 1969; div. 1973) Robert Urich (m. 1975; died 2002)
- Children: 3

Heather Margaret Brotherston Menzies Urich (December 3, 1949 – December 24, 2017) was a Canadian actress known for her roles as Louisa von Trapp in the 1965 film The Sound of Music and Jessica 6 in the TV series Logan's Run.

== Early life ==
Heather Margaret Brotherston Menzies was born in Toronto on December 3, 1949, to Scottish parents who had left the United Kingdom for Canada after the war. Her father was a struggling artist. By Menzies' 14th birthday, she had lived in Vancouver, Miami, London, and Southern California. Menzies had a younger sister, Sheila, and an older brother, Neil, who died in 2019.

Menzies was a graduate of John Burroughs High School in Burbank, California, in 1967, and she studied at Falcon Studio's University of the Arts.

== Career ==
Menzies' first appearance on-screen was in 1964, when she appeared in the TV series The Farmer's Daughter. Menzies was then cast in The Sound of Music as Louisa, the third oldest of the von Trapp children, at age 14. She sang "So Long, Farewell" and "The Lonely Goatherd" in the film. In the rowboat scene, Heather rescued Kym Karath, who played Gretl and could not swim.

Menzies went on to appear in a number of television series such as Alias Smith and Jones, T. J. Hooker, Dragnet 1967, Room 222, Bonanza, Marcus Welby, M.D., Vega$, and The Bob Newhart Show. She starred as Jessica 6 in the short-lived TV series Logan's Run. Menzies also appeared in Hawaii, How Sweet It Is!, Hail, Hero!, Piranha, and Endangered Species.

In 1973, Menzies was featured in Playboy magazine in a pictorial titled "Tender Trapp," in reference to her The Sound of Music role. She was later cast in four television films: The Keegans, James Dean, Tail Gunner Joe, and Captain America.

== Personal life ==
Menzies married John Cluett in 1969 and divorced him four years later. She married Robert Urich in 1975. They first met the previous year while filming a commercial in which they "got married." They adopted three children. After Urich's death in 2002 of a rare form of cancer, Menzies established the Robert Urich Foundation and spent most of her time in her last years devoted to the organization, which raises money for cancer research and support for cancer patients.

== Death ==
Menzies-Urich was diagnosed with terminal brain cancer in November 2017. She died at age 68 on December 24, 2017, surrounded by her children and family members. According to Menzies-Urich's son Ryan Urich, "She was an actress, a ballerina and loved living her life to the fullest. She was not in any pain, but nearly four weeks after her diagnosis of terminal brain cancer, she had enough and took her last breath on this earth at 7:22 pm."

== Filmography ==
=== TV and Film ===
Year	Title	Role	Notes	Ref.
1964–1965	The Farmer's Daughter	Nancy Beth	3 episodes	
1964	My Three Sons	Mona	Episode: The Ballad of Lissa Stratmeyer	
1965	The Sound of Music	Louisa	Musical drama film produced and directed by Robert Wise	
1966	Hawaii	Mercy Bromley	Epic drama film directed by George Roy Hill	
1967–1969	Dragnet 1967	Various roles	5 episodes	
1968	How Sweet It Is!	Tour Girl	Comedy film directed by Jerry Paris	
1969	Hail, Hero!	Molly Adams	Based on the novel of the same name by John Weston	
1969	The High Chaparral	Beth "Elizabeth" Roberts	Episode: The Little Thieves	
1969	The Computer Wore Tennis Shoes	Extra	* Comedy film directed by Robert Butler	* Uncredited
1969	Room 222	Girl in Newspaper Office	Episode: Funny Boy	
1970	Bonanza	Martha Thornton	Episode: Thornton's Account	
1970	To Rome With Love	Andrea	Episode: Beautiful People	
1971	The Smith Family	Janie Bradford	Episode: Cindy	
1971	Alias Smith and Jones	Annabel	Episode: The Girl in Boxcar #3	
1972	Outside In	Chris	Drama film directed by Allen Baron and G. D. Spradlin	
1973	Sssssss	Kristina Stoner		
1973	The Bob Newhart Show	Debbie Borden	Episode: Not with My Sister You Don't	
1974	Doctor Dan	Joyce Morgan	TV movie	
1974	Owen Marshall, Counselor at Law	Sally Waite	Episode: The Break In	
1975	S.W.A.T.	Sheri	Episode: Time Bomb	
1976	Barnaby Jones	Melinda Marks	Episode: Fraternity of Thieves	
1976	The Keegans	Brandy Keegan	TV movie	
1976	James Dean	Jan	TV movie	
1977	Tail Gunner Joe	Logan	TV movie	
1977	The Six Million Dollar Man	Alison Harker	Episode: Fires of Hell	
1977–1978	Logan's Run	Jessica	Main Role	
1978	Piranha	Maggie Mckeown	Satirical B horror film directed by Joe Dante	
1978–1979	The Love Boat	Various roles	2 episodes	
1979–1981	Vega$	Victoria Ballinger / Charlotte Henderson / Lisa	3 episodes	
1979	Captain America	Dr. Wendy Day	TV movie	
1982	Endangered Species	Susan	Science fiction film directed and co-written by Alan Rudolph	
1982	T.J. Hooker	Dr. Kincaid	Episode: "A Kind of Rage"	
1982	Gavilan	Dr. Katherine Maitland	Episode: "Pirates"	
1987	Spenser: For Hire	Miss Westmore	Episode: "The Road Back"	
1990	American Dreamer		Episode: "A Face in the Cloud"	
