= Raimondo Del Balzo =

Italian screenwriter and director

Raimondo Del Balzo (17 January 1939 – 22 September 1995) was an Italian screenwriter and director.

Born in Rome, Del Balzo first worked as a journalist and then entered the cinema industry in 1967 as a screenwriter. In 1973 he had a large commercial success with his directorial debut film, The Last Snows of Spring, a success confirmed by his second work, White Horses of Summer. These films launched a melodramatic subgenre known as "lacrima movie" (i.e. "tearjerker movie"), usually characterized by plots involving unfortunate children and fatal diseases. A strong sentimentalism was his trademark also in his later works, which indeed disappointed at the box office. Del Balzo died of cancer, as did the main characters of his first two films.
