= The Last Snows of Spring =

- Spanish film poster
- Directed by: Raimondo Del Balzo
- Written by: Raimondo Del Balzo; Antonio Troiso
- Produced by: Ovidio G. Assonitis
- Starring: Bekim Fehmiu; Agostina Belli; Renato Cestiè
- Cinematography: Roberto D'Ettorre Piazzoli
- Music by: Franco Micalizzi
- Release date: 20 December 1973
- Country: Italy
- Language: Italian

L'ultima neve di primavera (internationally known as The Last Snows of Spring) is a 1973 Italian drama film written and directed by Raimondo Del Balzo.

The film obtained a great commercial success and launched the career of child actor Renato Cestiè. Furthermore, the film started a genre of melodramatic films known as "tearjerker movie" or "lacrima movie".

== Plot ==
Luca, a boy attending boarding school, eagerly looks forward to spending the spring break home with his affluent, workaholic lawyer father Roberto, especially since he has residual sadness over the death of his mother. However, Roberto initially continues to spend long hours at his job, and Luca whiles the time with a platonic school friend, Steafanella, dabbling in trying alcohol and smoking. While watching home movies, Luca discovers that his father has a new girlfriend he has not told him about.

Roberto finally agrees to take Luca for a beach holiday, but with little warning, tells him that his new companion, Veronica, will join them. Veronica, sympathetic to Luca likely feeling overwhelmed by change, and also frustrated with Roberto's prioritizing work, volunteers to stay at a nearby hotel, and makes attempts to connect with him. Initially resistant, Luca warms to Veronica, showing her a favorite secret place from previous visits. When he catches her and his father kissing, however, he runs away; Roberto calls the police, but Veronica instinctively goes to Luca's secret spot, and coaxes him back by promising not to reveal its location.

Roberto has cut short the beach trip to attend to a pressing case, but after Luca confronts him about his mixed feelings about having a potential new parent in his life, he agrees to let him stay home from school an extra week so they can go skiing. As they enjoy the holiday, Luca casually mentions ill feelings he dismisses as poor eating or exhaustion. One morning, Luca wakes before his father, who begs off to sleep more, and Luca goes on his own to sled down the slopes before they get busy. When he hits a patch of exposed ice, he wipes out and is knocked unconscious.

When he wakes up in hospital, the presiding doctor confides in Roberto that Luca is in an advanced stage of leukemia, and while they can attempt some new procedures from America, his chances of survival are small. Luca tells his father he knows he is dying because he has never felt this sort of pain before, and remembers a description of death from one of his school readings that he says matches his physical and emotional state. During one of Roberto's evening vigils, Luca begs him to take him out to a nearby amusement park; he disconnects his instruments and sneaks him out, convincing the night custodians of the park to indulge them. On one ride, Luca confesses that he bought a record for his father upon coming home from school, but got upset over his work neglect and hid it, telling him where it can be found. Veronica has been alerted about the impromptu visit, and arrives in time to watch Roberto cradling Luca on a scrambler (ride) as the boy bids him goodbye and dies.

== Cast ==
- Bekim Fehmiu: Roberto
- Agostina Belli: Veronica
- Renato Cestiè: Luca
- Nino Segurini: Bernardo
- Margherita Horowitz: Mariolina
- Margherita Melandri: Stefanella
