= Jon Davison (film producer) =

American film producer

Jon Davison is an American film producer.

== Career ==
Davison worked at New World Pictures in the 1970s.

His producing credits include Airplane! (1980), RoboCop (1987), RoboCop 2 (1990), Starship Troopers (1997), and The 6th Day (2000).

Davison and animator Sally Cruikshank were married March 17, 1984, and have a daughter, Dinah.

== Archive ==
The moving image collection of Joe Dante and Davison is held at the Academy Film Archive. The joint collection includes feature films, pre-production elements, and theatrical trailer reels.

== Select filmography ==
He was a producer in all films unless otherwise noted.

=== Film ===
Year	Film	Credit	Notes
1974	Big Bad Mama	Associate producer	
1976	Hollywood Boulevard		
1977	Grand Theft Auto		
1978	Piranha		
1980	Airplane!		
1982	White Dog		
1984	Top Secret!		
1987	RoboCop	Executive producer	
1990	RoboCop 2		
1994	Trapped in Paradise		
1997	Starship Troopers		
2000	The 6th Day		
2007	Searchers 2.0		

Miscellaneous crew

Year	Film	Role
1972	Night Call Nurses	Assistant to director

Second unit director or assistant director

Year	Film	Role
1979	Rock 'n' Roll High School	Second unit director
1981	The Howling	Second unit director

Production manager

Year	Film	Role
1977	Thunder and Lightning	Post-production supervisor

Thanks

Year	Film	Role	Notes
1962	Lawrence of Arabia	Special thanks	1989 restoration
1981	Texas Lightning	Special thanks	
1982	Eating Raoul	The producers wish to thank	
1988	Invasion Earth: The Aliens Are Here	Special thanks	
1991	El Patrullero	Thanks	
1992	One False Move	The filmmakers wish to express their gratitude to	

=== Television ===
Year	Title	Notes
2004	Starship Troopers 2: Hero of the Federation	Television film

Miscellaneous crew

Year	Title	Role
1994	RoboCop	Creative consultant
