= Roberto D'Ettorre Piazzoli =

Italian film producer and cinematographer

- Born: 27 April 1942 (age 82); Rome, Italy
- Occupation(s): Cinematographer, film producer

Roberto D’Ettorre Piazzoli (born 27 April 1942) is an Italian film producer and cinematographer who has worked frequently with Ovidio G. Assonitis.

Born in Rome, Piazzoli began working for the Italian movie industry in the early 1960s as a cameraman, under the direction of Vittorio De Sica, Damiano Damiani, Marco Ferreri, Florestano Vancini, Mauro Bolognini, Dino Risi and Pasquale Festa Campanile.

As a cinematographer he has worked on such films as The Last Snows of Spring and as co-director (under the pseudonym Robert Barrett) on Beyond the Door and Tentacles directed by Ovidio G. Assonitis; he also co-directed Laure, together with Louis-Jacques Rollet-Andriane, Emmanuelle Arsan's husband.

His filmography also includes No Place to Hide, Over the Line, Sposi, Fratelli e Sorelle and Laguna.
