= The Curse (film series) =

Horror film franchise

- Promotional Poster Artwork for the Tetralogy
- Directed by: David Keith, Frederico Prosperi, Sean Barton, David Schmoeller
- Starring: Wil Wheaton, Claude Akins, Bo Svenson, Jill Schoelen, Christopher Lee, Jenilee Harrison, Tim Van Patten
- Countries: Italy, United States, United Kingdom, Japan, South Africa
- Languages: Italian, English

The Curse pentalogy is a horror series of five originally unconnected films that were retitled to be part of a supernatural franchise for the American home video market. The series started in 1987 with The Curse. 1993's Curse IV: The Ultimate Sacrifice is notable due to the fact the fourth film was originally made in 1988, predating the third film Curse III: Blood Sacrifice which was released in 1991. The only loose connections between the films are the first two are Italian productions produced by Ovidio G. Assonitis, otherwise the films are completely unrelated.

== Films ==
=== The Curse (1987) ===
An international co-production film between Italy and The United States. Principal photography began on September 29, 1986, under the title The Farm, after being announced previously as The Well. David Keith, a native of Knoxville, utilized his farm property in Tellico Plains, Tennessee for the film, while the interiors were shot in Rome. Many of the crew members, who were Italian, were billed under American names, including associate producer Lucio Fulci. Actor Treat Williams was reportedly set to star in the film, but was not involved with the film itself. The Curse opened in Los Angeles and New York on September 11, 1987. It earned $1,169,922 from its opening weekend in 326 theaters, and finished grossing $1,930,001 at the box office. The film went on to be a major home video success in the rental market causing three unrelated films to be retitled as sequels.

=== Curse II: The Bite (1989) ===
An international co-production film between Italy, The United States and Japan. Originally filmed with the title The Bite, the film was later retitled Curse II: The Bite by the American distributors, who had also bought the rights to two Italian Ovidio G. Assonitis, this and Beyond the Door III. The film was retitled to capitalize on the home video success of The Curse.

=== Curse III: Blood Sacrifice (1991) ===
An international co-production between The United Kingdom and South Africa. Originally filmed with the title Panga, it would eventually be retitled as Curse III: Blood Sacrifice by the American distributors, RCA/Columbia Pictures Home Video. The film was released direct-to-video in 1990. Internationally it has been released under its original title Panga and simply Blood Sacrifice. Fangoria gave the film a negative review stating "There was The Curse, then Curse II: The Bite, and now Curse III, obvious right? Unfortunately the same brand of elementary thinking went into the plotting of this newest Curse epic."

=== Curse IV: The Ultimate Sacrifice (1988) ===
An Italian production. The film was the last officially completed film by Empire Pictures under the title Catacombs and shown at the Cannes Film Festival on May 14, 1988, before the company and film was seized by Crédit Lyonnais for failure to pay on loans. As a result, the film's release was delayed for five years. It was eventually given the new title Curse IV: The Ultimate Sacrifice by Columbia TriStar Home Video and was released direct-to-video on VHS in 1993.

=== Curse V: Bollywood Bloodbath (2008) ===
An Indian production. The film was completed in 2008 under the title Pirate's Blood by Jayashree Cine International. Eventually, it was released by Retrosploitation under the title Curse V: Bollywood Bloodbath.

Film	Alternate English Title	Release Date	Director	Producer(s)
The Curse	The Farm	September 11, 1987	David Keith	Ovidio G. Assonitis
Curse II: The Bite	The Bite	July 23, 1989	Frederico Prosperi	Ovidio G. Assonitis
Curse III: Blood Sacrifice	Panga	May 10, 1991	Sean Barton	Christopher Coy, Elizabeth Shorten Coy
Curse IV: The Ultimate Sacrifice	Catacombs	May 14, 1988	David Schmoeller	Charles Band, Hope Perello
Curse V: Bollywood Bloodbath	Pirate's Blood	2008	Mark Ratering	Mohsin Al-bu Saidi, Nasser Al-Ruqashi, Gulab Prem Kumar, Mark Ratering, James Wagnor

=== Home media ===
The Curse was released on VHS by Media Home Entertainment, as well as on Laserdisc by Image Entertainment, in 1987. It was re-released on VHS by Polygram Video in 1998. On September 9, 2008, Metro-Goldwyn-Mayer released the film and its sequel, Curse II: The Bite, on DVD as a double-feature. Scream Factory, a sub-label of Shout! Factory, released both films as a double-feature on Blu-ray on February 23, 2016.

Curse II: The Bite was released on VHS by Vestron Home Video, as well as on Laserdisc by Image Entertainment, in 1989. On September 9, 2008, Metro-Goldwyn-Mayer released the film and The Curse on DVD as a double-feature. The film was presented in pan and scan full frame and contained the Curse II: The Bite" title card in the opening credits. Scream Factory, sub-label of Shout! Factory, released both The Curse and Curse II: The Bite as a double-feature on Blu-ray on February 23, 2016. This new widescreen version contained the original The Bite title card in the opening credits.

Curse III: Blood Sacrifice was released on VHS as well as on Laserdisc by RCA/Columbia Pictures Home Video, in 1991. Both of these versions contain the Curse III: Blood Sacrifice title card in the opening credits. On November 17, 2015, Metro-Goldwyn-Mayer released widescreen version of the film on DVD with the title Panga both on the box artwork and title card. On October 11, 2020, Scorpion Releasing released the film on Blu-ray. The Blu-ray version displayed the Curse III: Blood Sacrifice title on the box artwork but the opening title card of the film displays the title Panga.

Curse IV: The Ultimate Sacrifice was released in 1988 and on VHS as well as on Laserdisc by RCA/Columbia Pictures Home Video, in 1993. Both of these versions contain the Curse IV: The Ultimate Sacrifice title card in the opening credits. On October 29, 2013, Scream Factory, sub-label of Shout! Factory, released the film on DVD under its original title Catacombs in a quadruple feature entitled 4 All Night Horror Marathon Volume Two along with the films Cellar Dweller, The Dungeonmaster and Contamination .7. Scream Factory later re-issued the film on Blu-ray on July 14, 2015, in a double feature with Cellar Dweller. Both of the Scream Factory releases have the Catacombs name on the opening title card of the film.

Curse V: Bollywood Bloodbath was released on DVD by Retrosploitation.
