= Trans World Entertainment (film company) =

American film production and distribution company

- Type: Corporation
- Industry: Motion picture
- Founded: 1983; 43 years ago
- Founder: Moshe Diamant; Sunil Shah
- Defunct: 1992; 34 years ago
- Fate: Foreclosed, assets folded into Epic Productions
- Successor: Company: Epic Productions; Library: Metro-Goldwyn-Mayer (through Orion Pictures); Universal Pictures (Carlito's Way only)
- Headquarters: Los Angeles, California, United States
- Key people: Tom Coleman; Michael Rosenblatt; Moshe Diamant; Eduard Sarlui
- Products: Motion Pictures
- Parent: Crédit Lyonnais (1993–1996); PolyGram Filmed Entertainment (1996–1998)

Trans World Entertainment was an American independent production and distribution company which produced low-to-medium budget films mostly targeted for home-video market. In the early 1990s, the company became embroiled in the Credit Lyonnais banking scandal in Hollywood and was foreclosed on by the bank and subsequently incorporated into the Epic Library. Since 1998, its library has been owned by Metro-Goldwyn-Mayer.

== History ==
=== Founding and early years (1983–1986) ===
The company was founded as a video distribution company in summer 1983 by Moshe Diamant and Sunil Shah.

In 1984, it bought out the video distribution rights to shows handled by various syndicators, including Viacom Enterprises and Ziv International for a 200-title agreement. Also that year, it expanded into the world of theatrical film distribution and production, with a lineup of fully-funded films (three films per year), some of which were exhibited at the Cannes Film Festival; the theatrical film division was headed up by William Dunn.

Diamant met with filmmaker William Malone in 1985 and Malone pitched him a science-fiction horror film in the vein of Alien. The resulting film was Creature. Trans World Entertainment also produced Pray for Death starring Sho Kosugi the same year. Both films were maligned by critics, but were successful in the home video marketplace.

Also in 1985, Trans World Entertainment agreed to merge with Cardinal Entertainment to form a new outfit, Cardinal/TWE; Cardinal Entertainment would be the distributor of Trans World Entertainment's theatrical feature film projects. TWE additionally entered into an agreement with Sarlui's Continental Motion Pictures; Continental would handle worldwide distribution on the titles TWE produced (aiming for six to ten pictures per year), and Continental gained access to the TWE library.

In 1986, Media Home Entertainment inked a deal with TWE for Media to distribute TWE's theatrical titles on videocassette. In mid 1986, Eduard Sarlui, brought his company Continental Motion Pictures into TWE. He had founded Continental with his sister Helen and it had produced a number of films including Ator, the Fighting Eagle and Warrior of the Lost World. Sarlui became CEO and chairman, while Paul Mason was installed as President of Production; TWE's output increased considerably. This was primarily due to them acquiring the rights to Italian genre titles from filmmakers such as Joe D'Amato; TWE would retitle and dub them and release them straight to video. Sarlui was the first entertainment client of Slavenburg Bank, before it was acquired by Crédit Lyonnais and introduced many independent film companies to the bank.

On September 10, 1986, Trans World Entertainment announced that David Keith had signed on to direct two projects greenlit by TWE.

=== Founding of Epic Productions and acquisition of Empire International Pictures (1986–1989) ===
The company employed a pre-sales model for their product and through the mid-to-late 1980s continued to produce modest direct to video hits such as Moon in Scorpio starring Britt Ekland and Interzone. They also continued to distribute films such as Killer Klowns from Outer Space. In 1987, they signed a multi-picture deal with Italian producer Ovidio G. Assonitis. The first of the films to be produced was The Farm, released as The Curse, a science-fiction horror film starring Wil Wheaton and Claude Akins, based on H. P. Lovecraft's short story The Colour Out of Space. The film earned $1,169,922 from its opening weekend, and finished with a gross of $1,930,001 at the box office. The film also sold considerably well on home video.

In 1986, Diamant and Sarlui created a sister company entitled Epic Productions; Sarlui would remain chairman and CEO of Trans World Entertainment and Diamant would become CEO and Chairman of Epic. A line of credit of $60 million was arranged with French bank Credit Lyonnais Bank Nederland for Epic to produce films that would be distributed under an exclusive marketing agreement with RCA/Columbia Pictures Home Video. Assonitis' next two films for Trans World Entertainment, The Bite and Amok Train, were retitled as Curse II: The Bite and Beyond the Door III respectively by RCA/Columbia Pictures to capitalize on the success of The Curse and Assonitis' 1974 mega-hit Beyond the Door, despite no connections between the films.

On October 22, 1986, TWE announced plans to make multiple high-budget films that would begin production within the next nine months; their sales effort included a package of pictures from Continental Motion Pictures, led by Helen Sarlui, who by now was serving as vice president of TWE's video division, and included the signing of deals with various writers, including Steven de Souza, who was signed to write three films and given an opportunity to make his directorial debut and serve as overall creative consultant of the studio.

On February 18, 1987, while TWE was in the stages of prepping 20 projects for release, the company started its own domestic distribution division, paying out $5 million in royalties to the studio for its own first four feature films; additionally, Dino Constantine Conte had signed a three-picture agreement with the studio in order to serve as producer of TWE's film productions, beginning with November Man, and announced a second picture in TWE's two-picture deal with film star Beau Bridges. On April 8, 1987, Shah, who was president of TWE, was bought out by Sarlui who became a partner of TWE. Shah set up a new home video/film distributor, Imperial Entertainment.

In late August 1987, TWE signed another six-picture agreement with Media; their previous deal brought MHE the home video rights to such films as Full Moon in Blue Water, Kansas, Killer Klowns from Outer Space, Hardcover, Cinderella Rock and Teen Witch; the new deal included the video rights to titles like Rage of Honor, Programmed to Kill and Iron Warrior. All rights reverted from Heron to TWE by 1989. Full Moon in Blue Water and Kansas premiered at the 1988 Cannes Film Festival and TWE became the star of the film market.

TWE acquired 50% of Mark Damon's Vision P.D.G. International, who handled TWE's overseas sales.

By 1988, Charles Band's Empire International Pictures began to collapse under mounting long-term debt obligations to Crédit Lyonnais, which included the purchase of Castello di Giove, a 12th-century castle located in Giove, Italy. and the Dino de Laurentiis Cinematografica. Crédit Lyonnais foreclosed on Empire, forcing founder Band out. The bank then approached Epic with an offer to extend their line of credit from $60 million to $200 million to absorb Empire's assets into Epic and restructure the company. Epic's takeover of Empire was completed in May 1988 and led to in-production titles such as Stuart Gordon's Robot Jox, Peter Manoogian's Arena, and David Schmoeller's Catacombs to be delayed in release by several years.

The merger with Empire allowed several in-production Trans World titles to be released as "stand-alone" sequels to earlier films, such as Goblins, directed by Claudio Fragasso, being renamed Troll 2, and Panga to be released as Curse III: Blood Sacrifice. Catacombs was also retitled as Curse IV: The Ultimate Sacrifice.

In September 1988, Diamant and Sarlui founded a separate company, Cinema Corp. of America, to produce larger scale theatrical motion pictures alongside independent film producer Elliott Kastner. The start-up company was assisted by Crédit Lyonnais with an initial start-up investment of $65 million. Kastner signed Marlon Brando to write and star in their first picture, Jericho, where Brando would play a CIA agent who comes out of retirement for a tricky assignment. Donald Cammell was tapped to direct, with shooting slated to begin in Mexico in November 1988, but after months of pre-production on location, Brando apparently dropped out of the project, citing insurance issues. In 1989, the company entered into a distribution deal with Triumph Releasing Corporation to distribute the films theatrically. The first film came out of the deal was Triumph of the Spirit, which was packaged by TWE.

During this time, Trans World Entertainment and Epic Productions continued to produce and release films such as Ghosts Can't Do It, starring Bo Derek and Anthony Quinn, and Honeymoon Academy, with Robert Hays and Kim Cattrall.

=== Vision International deal and exit from film production (1990–1991) ===
President of Production Paul Mason departed the company in 1990, and the company was still producing five pictures a year, including Ski Patrol, and releasing Italian imports such as Top Model 2, directed by Pasquale Fanetti. However, the restructuring following the acquisition of Empire by Crédit Lyonnais caused friction between Diamant, Sarlui and the bank. By this time, Crédit Lyonnais had financed the takeover of The Cannon Group, Inc. and Metro-Goldwyn-Mayer by Italian financier Giancarlo Parretti, who was close to defaulting on his loans. Diamant and Sarlui discovered that the Crédit Lyonnais restructuring was also hiding bad debt incurred by the bank.

While this was going on, Trans World Entertainment and Epic Productions entered into a sales distribution agreement with Mark Damon's Vision P.D.G. International. The deal effectively ended Trans World Entertainment as a distribution entity, with Moshe Diamant becoming co-chairman of Vision and Sarlui also becoming a significant shareholder. The final film to carry the Trans World Entertainment name was Eyes of an Angel starring John Travolta. Trans World Entertainment effectively became a holding company for the library of 150 produced films.

Shortly afterwards, Vision International and Epic Productions entered into a co-production deal with Stone Group Pictures, owned by Michael Douglas.

=== Crédit Lyonnais control (1992–1996) ===
Crédit Lyonnais foreclosed on Giancarlo Parretti and Metro-Goldwyn-Mayer in 1991, and investigations into the bank's practices and associations began in both the United States and France. In August 1992, Crédit Lyonnais foreclosed on Epic Productions and Trans World Entertainment, removing Moshe Diamant and Eduard Sarlui from the company. Immediately following their removal, Vision International terminated their production and distribution agreement with Epic and Trans World. Former company directors Diamant and Sarlui immediately filed a lawsuit against the bank for $100 million for breach of contract and various damages; January 1993 saw Crédit Lyonnais file a countersuit against Diamant and Sarlui, claiming they overstated the company's financial position and stole money from the bank. Sarlui and Diamant also sued their former attorney, Eugene L. Wolver, for assisting Crédit Lyonnais in their attempts to bury their bad loans in the Empire/Epic merger, leading to Epic being seized by the bank.

During this time, Vision International cut ties with Crédit Lyonnais completely, instead receiving backing from Mercantile National and Kredietbank Luxembourg. However, the ongoing lawsuits with Crédit Lyonnais put pressure on Vision International's producing interest, which lead to founder Mark Damon to depart the company in June 1993. In a May 1993 judgement, Crédit Lyonnais was barred from foreclosing on Trans World Entertainment due to the ongoing lawsuit by Sarlui and Diamant. Eventually Diamant joined Damon at his new company, Mark Damon Productions, in 1994 once the issues between Vision International and Crédit Lyonnais were resolved. Sarlui continued to be a shareholder in Mark Damon Productions, but no longer held an active position in the company. Once the lawsuits were settled, Crédit Lyonnais paid compensation to both Diamant and Sarlui, and Trans World Entertainment was absorbed into Epic Productions, under Crédit Lyonnais control.

=== Sale to PolyGram Filmed Entertainment and MGM ownership (1997–1998) ===
After Crédit Lyonnais successfully combined the assets of The Cannon Group Inc., Cannon Pictures and Pathé Communications, folding all 3 of them into MGM, and sold the company back to Kirk Kerkorian for a reported $1.3 billion (which was the same amount Giancarlo Parretti had purchased it from Kerkorian for, also a significant overall loss for the bank), they sought to do the same with the assets of Epic Productions, Trans World Entertainment, Empire International, Vision International and other film libraries they now owned (which also included films from Castle Rock Entertainment (home video rights only), Nelson Entertainment, Sherwood Productions and its successor Gladden Entertainment, Hemdale Film Corporation, Dino De Laurentiis Communications, Fries Entertainment, Embassy Pictures (home video rights only, library owned by StudioCanal via Paravision International), 21st Century Film Corporation and Scotti Bros. Pictures. The bank merged the libraries into the "Epic Film Collection" or simply the "Epic library" (organized into different holding companies named after the Greek alphabet, i.e. "Alpha Library Company") and began to take bids on the property. MGM, The Walt Disney Company, PolyGram Filmed Entertainment and Live Entertainment all submitted bids, with the ultimate winner being PolyGram with an offer of $225 million.

Despite this success, however, PolyGram Filmed Entertainment sold their library to MGM the following year for $235 million, following being taken over by Seagram and the subsequent folding into Universal Pictures in 1999. MGM would place the library under Orion Pictures' control in order to avoid a video distribution pact MGM had with Warner Home Video; this resulted, after a legal battle, in MGM breaking their video distribution agreement with Warner earlier than intended, and MGM then began to release these movies under their own branding, being distributed internationally through 20th Century Fox Home Entertainment (though these libraries are still held within the former Orion Pictures). Meanwhile, in November 2002, the government conducted an auction for Crédit Lyonnais' residual ten-percent stake, which was won by BNP Paribas, but Crédit Agricole subsequently launched a successful friendly takeover bid and took full ownership of Crédit Lyonnais in July 2003.

Crédit Agricole merged its own investment banking arm, Banque Indosuez, with Crédit Lyonnais's and renamed the merged entity Calyon (for Crédit Agricole Lyonnais) in 2004, but that brand was changed in 2010 to Crédit Agricole CIB (for Commercial and Investment Bank), reflecting the gradual phasing out of the Crédit Lyonnais identity. Also in 2010, the bank's staff eventually moved out of the historic headquarters on Boulevard des Italiens to relocate to the Parisian suburb of Villejuif. Meanwhile, in 2005, the Crédit Lyonnais brand, perceived as tainted by the 1990s turmoil, had been replaced within the French retail network with the blander LCL (introduced as "Crédit Lyonnais, just more dynamic and better performing"), and the number of LCL branches gradually decreased in subsequent years.

== Filmography ==
=== Trans World Entertainment ===
==== Productions ====
Year	Title	Notes	Ref
1984	She	Co-Produced with Continental Motion Pictures	
1985	Creature		
1985	Master Class	Direct-to-Video, distributed by U.S.A. Home Video.	
1985	Pray for Death		
1986	Ninja Theater Hosted by Sho Kosugi – "Katana"	Direct-to-Video. See "Fists of Dragons" and "Diamond Ninja Force"	
1986	Ninja Theater Hosted by Sho Kosugi – "Bo"	Direct-to-Video. See "Shaolin Temple Strikes Back" and "Ninja Champion"	
1986	Ninja Theater Hosted by Sho Kosugi – "Ninja Fan"	Direct-to-Video. See "The Little Heroes of Shaolin Temple" and "Golden Destroyers"	
1986	Ninja Theater Hosted by Sho Kosugi – "Tekagi"	Direct-to-Video. See "Young Hero" and "Golden Ninja Warrior"	
1986	Ninja Theater Hosted by Sho Kosugi – "Shikomizue"	Direct-to-Video. See "Shaolin Drunk Fighter" and "Venus the Ninja"	
1986	Ninja Theater Hosted by Sho Kosugi – "Yari"	Direct-to-Video. See "The Great Massacre" and "The Dragon, The Odds"	
1986	Ninja Theater Hosted by Sho Kosugi – "Tonfa"	Direct-to-Video. See "Ninja Terminator" (PAL) and "Wolfen Ninja"	
1986	Ninja Theater Hosted by Sho Kosugi – "Shobo"	Direct-to-Video. See "Flash Challenger", "Ninja Terminator" and "Challenge the Ninja"	
1986	Ninja Theater Hosted by Sho Kosugi – "Self Defense"	Direct-to-Video. See "Eagle Claws Champion"	
1986	Ninja Theater Hosted by Sho Kosugi – "Jitte"	Direct-to-Video. See "Phoenix the Ninja"	
1986	Ninja Theater Hosted by Sho Kosugi – "Kama"	Direct-to-Video. See "Ninja, The Protector"	
1986	Ninja Theater Hosted by Sho Kosugi – "Nunchaku"	Direct-to-Video. See "Kingfisher the Killer"	
1986	Ninja Theater Hosted by Sho Kosugi – "Manriki-gusari"	Direct-to-Video. See "Champ Against Champ"	
1986	Karatix	Direct-to-Video.	
1987	Rage of Honor		
1987	Programmed to Kill		
1987	Commando Squad		
1987	Catch the Heat		
1987	Moon in Scorpio		
1987	Survival Game		
1987	The Curse		
1987	The Wild Pair		
1988	Deep Space		
1988	The Further Adventures of Tennessee Buck		
1988	Red Nights		
1988	Killer Klowns from Outer Space		
1988	Seven Hours to Judgment		
1988	Kansas		
1988	Full Moon in Blue Water		
1989	Sonny Boy		
1989	I, Madman		
1989	Teen Witch		
1989	Curse II: The Bite		
1989	Interzone		
1989	Out on Bail		
1989	Night Game		
1989	Honeymoon Academy		
1991	Committed		
1991	Eyes of an Angel		

==== Theatrical distribution ====
Year	Title	Notes	Ref
1985	Screen Test	Non-US release	
1987	Iron Warrior	A Continental Motion Pictures Production	
1988	Lone Runner		
1989	Arena		
1989	Riding the Edge		
1992	Auntie Lee's Meat Pies		

==== Home video releases ====
Year	Title	Catalog #	Notes	Ref
1984	The Falcon	36001	VHS release of 1981 film	
1984	Keeping On			
1984	Return of the Man from U.N.C.L.E.	10019		
1984	The Keeper	10031	VHS release of 1976 film	
1984	Ghost Dance	10032		
1984	Coming Out Alive	10042	VHS release of 1980 TV movie	
1984	The Accident	10048		
1984	The Man Inside	10054	VHS release of 1977 TV movie	
1984	The Intruder Within	10058	VHS release of 1981 TV movie	
1984	Alligator Shoes	10063	VHS release of 1981 film	
1984	War Brides	10066		
1984	The Night the Lights Went Out in Georgia	10073	VHS release of 1981 film	
1984	Slipstream	10074	VHS release of 1973 film	
1984	One Night Stand	10075	VHS release of 1978 TV movie	
1984	The Strangeness	13006		
1984	The Houndcats		VHS release of 1972 Animated TV series	
1984	Ultraman II	13501	VHS release of 1979 Animated TV series	
1984	The Houndcats Vol. II	13502	VHS release of 1972 Animated TV series	
1985	The Houndcats Volume 3	13503	VHS release of 1972 Animated TV series	
1985	The Houndcats Volume 4	13509	VHS release of 1972 Animated TV series	
1985	The Houndcats Volume 5	13512	VHS release of 1972 Animated TV series	
1984	The Barkleys	13506	VHS release of 1972 Animated TV series	
1985	The Barkleys Volume 2	13508	VHS release of 1972 Animated TV series	
1985	The Barkleys Volume 3		VHS release of 1972 Animated TV series	
1985	The Barkleys Volume 4		VHS release of 1972 Animated TV series	
1985	The Barkleys Volume 5		VHS release of 1972 Animated TV series	
1985	The Barkleys Volume 6		VHS release of 1972 Animated TV series	
1985	The Barkleys Volume 7		VHS release of 1972 Animated TV series	
1984	Return of the Dinosaurs	13504		
1984	Chinese Connection II	15001		
1984	Duel of the Seven Tigers	15003		
1984	The Thundering Mantis	15004		
1984	10 Magnificent Killers	15005		
1984	Kung Fu Kids	15006		
1984	Daggers 8	15007	VHS release of 1980 film	
1984	The Junkman	16001		
1984	Crazed	17002		
1984	Diary of Forbidden Dreams	17003	VHS release of 1972 film	
1984	Bare Knuckles	17004	VHS release of 1977 film	
1984	Invisible Strangler	18001	VHS release of alternate cut of 1978 film	
1984	Jungle Heat	20001		
1984	And If I'm Elected	21001		
1985	A Far Cry from Home	10057	VHS release of 1981 TV movie	
1985	The July Group		VHS release of 1981 TV movie	
1985	The Hard Part Begins			
1985	The Dawson Patrol	10011		
1985	Explosion	10034	VHS release of 1969 film	
1985	Springhill	10068		
1985	The Clown Murders	10077	VHS release of 1976 film	
1985	125 Rooms of Comfort	10078	VHS release of 1974 film	
1985	How to Pick Up Girls!	10079	VHS release of 1978 TV movie	
1985	Summer's Children	10081		
1985	Hellriders	10083		
1985	Copkillers	10086	VHS release of 1977 film	
1985	Overlanders	10088	VHS release of 1979 TV movie	
1985	The Devlin Connection #1 "Brian and Nick"	10620	VHS release of The Devlin Connection TV series	
1985	The Devlin Connection 2 "The Lady on the Billboard"		VHS release of The Devlin Connection TV series	
1985	The Master Ninja	10650	VHS release of The Master TV series	
1985	The Master Ninja 2	10652	VHS release of The Master TV series	
1985	The Master Ninja 3	10654	VHS release of The Master TV series	
1985	The Master Ninja 4	10656	VHS release of The Master TV series	
1985	The Master Ninja 5	10658	VHS release of The Master TV series	
1985	The Master Ninja 6	10660	VHS release of The Master TV series	
1985	The Master Ninja 7	10662	VHS release of The Master TV series	
1985	USA All-Star Wrestling	10701		
1985	USA All-Star Wrestling Volume 2	10702		
1986	USA All-Star Wrestling Volume 3	10703		
1986	USA All-Star Wrestling Volume 4	10704		
1986	USA All-Star Wrestling Free-For-Brawl	10705		
1985	The Demons of Ludlow	11003		
1985	The Marvelous Stunts of Kung Fu	15008		
1985	The Iron Dragon Strikes Back	15009		
1985	Two Wondrous Tigers	15010	VHS release of 1980 film	
1985	Black Magic Terror	15011	TWE's Twilight Video VHS release of the 1981 film "Ratu Ilmu Hitam"	
1985	The Invincible Armor	15012		
1985	The Kung Fu Warrior	15013		
1985	The Sleeping Fist	15014	VHS release of 1979 film	
1985	The Chinese Stuntman	15015		
1985	Duel of the Brave Ones	15016		
1985	Way of the Black Dragon	15017		
1985	Exit the Dragon, Enter the Tiger	15018		
1985	Kung Fu Genius	15019		
1985	Snake in the Eagle's Shadow 2	15020	VHS release of 1979 film	
1985	White Fire	19001		
1985	Assassination	19002	VHS release of 1980 film	
1985	Dead End Street	22000		
1985	Trap Them and Kill Them	23000	TWE's Twilight Video VHS release of the 1977 film "Emanuelle and the Last Cannibals"	
1985	Bloodbeat	24001		
1985	The Hard Way	25002	VHS release of 1980 TV movie	
1985	Bloody Moon	26001	VHS release of 1981 film	
1985	Thunder Warrior	27001		
1985	Tor: Mighty Warrior	28001		
1985	Five for Hell	28002	VHS release of 1969 film	
1985	A Fistful of Death	28003	VHS release of 1971 film	
1985	Sex with the Stars	29001	VHS release of 1980 film	
1985	Summer Night Fever	29002	VHS release of 1978 film	
1985	The Professionals	30001	VHS release of TV series	
1986	Blue Paradise	36004		
1985	Sword of Heaven	37001		
1986	Devil's Crude	38001	VHS release of 1971 film	
1986	Bandera Bandits	38003	VHS release of 1972 film	
1986	Return to Earth	10080	VHS release of 1976 TV movie	
1986	The Phoenix Team	10087	VHS release of 1980 TV series	
1986	Side Show	10089	VHS release of 1981 TV movie	
1986	Fists of Dragons	15021	A "Ninja Theater Hosted by Sho Kosugi" release	
1986	The Ark of the Sun God	19004		
1986	That Lucky Touch	31001	VHS release of 1975 film	
1986	Shaolin Temple Strikes Back	32001	A "Ninja Theater Hosted by Sho Kosugi" release	
1986	The Little Heroes of Shaolin Temple	32002	A "Ninja Theater Hosted by Sho Kosugi" release	
1986	Young Hero	32003	A "Ninja Theater Hosted by Sho Kosugi" release	
1986	The Fighting Fist of Shanghai Joe	32004	VHS release of 1973 film	
1986	Shaolin Drunk Fighter	32005	A "Ninja Theater Hosted by Sho Kosugi" release	
1986	The Great Massacre	32006	A "Ninja Theater Hosted by Sho Kosugi" release	
1986	Raiders in Action	34001		
1986	Long Weekend	35001	VHS release of 1978 film	
1986	Bits & Pieces	37002		
1986	Travel Without Terror	37003		
1986	The Tomb	37004		
1986	Karatix	37005	A Trans World Entertainment Production	
1986	Duel in the Eclipse	38005		
1986	Condemned to Hell	38006		
1986	Gangsters' Law	38008	VHS release of 1969 film	
1986	Manhunter	38009	VHS release of 1980 film	
1986	Desperate Moves	38011	VHS release of 1980 film	
1986	Monster Dog	38013	A Continental Motion Pictures Production	
1986	Five Giants From Texas	38014		
1986	The Emperor Caligula: The Untold Story	38015		
1986	Soldier's Revenge	38016	A Continental Motion Pictures Production	
1986	Cold Eyes of Fear	38017	VHS release of 1971 film	
1986	Alien Predators	38061	A Continental Motion Pictures Production	
1986	Vulcan: God of Fire	38113	VHS release of 1962 film	
1986	Ninja Terminator	39001	A "Ninja Theater Hosted by Sho Kosugi" release	
1986	Flash Challenger	39002	A "Ninja Theater Hosted by Sho Kosugi" release	
1986	Eagle Claws Champion	39003	A "Ninja Theater Hosted by Sho Kosugi" release	
1986	Phoenix the Ninja	39004	A "Ninja Theater Hosted by Sho Kosugi" release	
1986	Ninja, The Protector	39005	A "Ninja Theater Hosted by Sho Kosugi" release	
1986	Kingfisher the Killer	39006	A "Ninja Theater Hosted by Sho Kosugi" release	
1986	Golden Destroyers	39007	A "Ninja Theater Hosted by Sho Kosugi" release	
1986	The Dragon, The Odds	39008	A "Ninja Theater Hosted by Sho Kosugi" release	
1986	Champ Against Champ	39009	A "Ninja Theater Hosted by Sho Kosugi" release	
1986	Ninja Dragon	39010		
1986	Golden Ninja Warrior	39011	A "Ninja Theater Hosted by Sho Kosugi" release	
1986	Diamond Ninja Force	39012	A "Ninja Theater Hosted by Sho Kosugi" release	
1986	Venus the Ninja	39013	A "Ninja Theater Hosted by Sho Kosugi" release	
1986	Wolfen Ninja	39014	A "Ninja Theater Hosted by Sho Kosugi" release	
1986	Challenge the Ninja	39015	A "Ninja Theater Hosted by Sho Kosugi" release	
1986	Ninja Champion	39016	A "Ninja Theater Hosted by Sho Kosugi" release	
1986	The Ultimate Ninja	39017		
1986	Ninja Destroyer	39018		
1986	Ninja Thunderbolt	39019		
1986	Ninja Hunt	39020		
1986	The Hot Touch	40001	VHS release of 1981 film	
1986	No Time to Die	41001		
1986	Ashanti: Land of No Mercy	43001		
1986	Zulu Dawn	43002	VHS release of 1979 film	
1986	Game for Vultures	43003	VHS release of 1979 film	
1986	Jaguar Lives	43004	VHS release of 1977 film	
1986	The Tormentors	46001	VHS release of 1971 film	
1986	Ninja in Action	48005		
1986	Challenge to White Fang	49002	VHS release of 1974 film	
1986	City in Panic	53001		
1986	Code Name: Zebra	0621		
1987	Blood Ties	10150	VHS release of TV movie	
1987	The Famous Five Get Into Trouble	19003		
1987	Commando Squad	37031	A Trans World Entertainment Production	
1987	Savage Guns	38002	VHS release of 1971 film	
1987	Tharus Son of Attila	38024	VHS release of 1962 film	
1987	An Animal Called Man	38056		
1987	Ninja Showdown	39021		
1987	The Ninja Squad	39022		
1987	Ninja Kill	39023		
1987	Vengeance	43005		
1987	The Delos Adventure	46002		
1987	Screwball Academy	46003		
1987	Thunder Warrior II	47001		
1987	Warriors of Fire	48002		
1987	The Night God Screamed	49001	VHS release of 1971 film	
1987	The Manhandlers	49003		
1987	Moon in Scorpio	0363	A Trans World Entertainment Production	
1987	Rough Justice	0425	VHS release of 1970 film	
1987	The Great Treasure Hunt	0449		
1987	Ninja Phantom Heroes	0573		
1987	The Thundering Ninja	0575		
1987	Death Code: Ninja	0576		
1987	Video Murders	0614		
1987	Terror on Alcatraz	0618		
1987	Evil Town	0619		
1987	Plutonium Baby	0620		
1987	The Misfit Brigade	0630		
1987	The Devlin Connection III "Love, Sin and Death at Point Dume"	0638	VHS release of The Devlin Connection TV series	
1987	House of Terror	0644	VHS release of 1973 film	
1988	To Be a Rose		VHS release of 1974 film	
1988	God's Bloody Acre	0232	VHS release of 1975 film	
1988	Red Nights	0359	A Trans World Entertainment Production	
1988	Private Road: No Trespassing	0372		
1988	Deep Space	0380	A Trans World Entertainment Production	
1988	Jailbird Rock	0481	A Continental Motion Pictures Production	
1988	Absolution	0583	VHS release of 1978 film	
1988	The Black Cobra	0617		
1988	Golden Ninja Invasion	0622		
1988	Ninja Fantasy	0623		
1988	Ninja Demon's Massacre	0624		
1988	Gallagher's Travels	0657		
1988	Visitants	0658		
1988	Husbands, Wives, Money and Murder	0660		
1988	Fire Fight	0661		
1988	Nightmare Sisters	0670		
1988	The Wolf	0672		
1988	Ninja Condors	0673		
1988	Defense Play	0676		
1988	Empire of Spiritual Ninja	0679		
1988	Vampire Raiders: Ninja Queen	0681		
1988	The Big Gag	0685		
1988	Mama Dracula	0686	VHS release of 1980 film	
1988	Hobgoblins	0688		
1988	Men of Steel	0689	VHS release of 1977 TV movie	
1988	The Game	0690		
1988	Ninja Force of Assassins	0691		
1988	Ninja's Extreme Weapons	0692		
1988	Ninja: The Battalion	0693		
1988	Clash of the Ninja	0694		
1988	Ninja the Violent Sorcerer	0695	VHS release of 1982 film	
1988	Maniac Cop	0698		
1988	Riding Fast	0707		
1988	Mama's Dirty Girls	0708	VHS release of 1974 film	
1988	The Last Witness	0717		
1989	I Don't Give a Damn	0637		
1989	Catacombs	N/A	VHS screener. Released on Epic Home Video as "Curse IV: The Ultimate Sacrifice".	
1989	Interzone	0369	A Trans World Entertainment Production	
1989	The Devil Wears White	0639		
1989	Outlaw Force	0643		
1989	Out on Bail	0651	A Trans World Entertainment Production	
1989	War Cat	0662		
1989	White Ghost	0675		
1989	The Shadow Killers	0680		
1989	Swift Justice	0687		
1989	Twisted Nightmare	0699		
1989	Counter Destroyer	0700		
1989	Instant Rage	0702		
1989	Close to Home	0714		
1989	Accidents	0719		
1989	Curse II: The Bite	0725		
1989	The Caller	0757		
1989	Deadly Weapon	0769		
1989	That's My Baby!	0840		
1989	Mutants in Paradise	0849		
1989	The Pay Off	0850		
1989	Redneck Zombies	0862		
1989	Devil's Dynamite	0868		
1989	Thunder Score	0869		

==== Non-US home video releases ====
Year	Title	Catalog #	Notes	Ref
1984	The Prey	TWE402	British VHS release	
1984	For the Love of It	10001	Australian VHS and BETA releases of 1980 TV movie	
1984	Kenny Rogers as The Gambler	10002	Australian VHS and BETA releases of 1980 TV movie	
1984	The Two Worlds of Jennie Logan	10003	Australian VHS and BETA releases of 1979 TV movie	
1984	The Kid with the Broken Halo	10004	Australian VHS and BETA releases of 1982 TV movie	
1984	Bitter Harvest	10005	Australian VHS and BETA releases of 1981 film	
1984	Hanging on a Star	10007	Australian VHS and BETA releases of 1978 film	
1984	She's Dressed to Kill	10008	Australian VHS and BETA releases of 1979 TV movie	
1984	Cocaine: One Man's Poison	10012	Australian VHS and BETA releases of 1983 TV movie	
1984	Terrytoons: Mighty Mouse – Vol. 1	10500	Australian VHS and BETA releases	
1984	Svengali	10010	Spanish BETA release of 1983 TV movie	
1984	Despojos de Guerra (Prisoners)	10065	Spanish BETA release of 1975 film	
1985	Panic in Echo Park	3007	Dutch VHS release of 1977 TV movie	

=== Epic Productions ===
==== Productions ====
Year	Title	Notes	Ref
1989	Ghosts Can't Do It	Epic Productions and Sarlui/Diamant	
1989	The Kill Reflex	Epic Productions and Po' Boy Productions	
1989	Beyond the Door III		
1990	Why Me?	Epic Productions and Sarlui/Diamant	
1990	Ski Patrol	Epic Productions and Sarlui/Diamant	
1990	Courage Mountain	Epic Productions and Stone Group Pictures	
1990	Bad Influence	Epic Productions and Sarlui/Diamant	
1990	Down the Drain		
1990	Waiting for the Light	Epic Productions and Sarlui/Diamant	
1990	Vietnam Texas		
1990	Men at Work	Epic Productions and Sarlui/Diamant	
1990	The Ambulance	Epic Productions and Sarlui/Diamant	
1990	Blood Games		
1991	Mom		
1991	Leather Jackets	Epic Productions and Sarlui/Diamant	
1993	Joshua Tree	co-production with Vision International	
1993	Carlito's Way	co-production with Universal Pictures	

==== Home video releases ====
Year	Title	Catalog #	Notes	Ref
1990	Cool Blue	59013		
1990	Down the Drain	59053	An Epic Productions Production	
1990	Triumph of the Spirit	59063		
1990	Wild Zone	59123		
1990	Quest for the Mighty Sword	59253		
1990	Blood Games	59143	An Epic Productions Production	
1990	Courage Mountain	59163	An Epic Productions Production	
1989	Beyond the Door III	59183	An Epic Productions Production	
1990	Warm Summer Rain	59043		
1990	Vietnam Texas	59193	An Epic Productions Production	
1990	The Immortalizer	59213		
1990	Crossing the Line	59223		
1990	Legion of Iron	59243		
1990	The Final Alliance	59273		
1990	Robot Jox	59363		
1990	Men at Work	59436	An Epic Productions Production	
1990	Ghosts Can't Do It	59513	An Epic Productions Production	
1991	Mom	59153	An Epic Productions Production	
1991	Curse III: Blood Sacrifice	59323		
1991	Arena	59353		
1992	Spellcaster	59693		
1992	Troll II	59743		
1993	Curse IV: The Ultimate Sacrifice	59343		
1993	The Crawlers	59753		

=== Vision International ===
==== Productions ====
Year	Title	Notes	Ref
1988	Bat*21	Tri-Star Pictures & Vision PDG	
1988	High Spirits	Vision PDG	
1989	Wild Orchid	Vision PDG	
1990	I Come in Peace	Vision PDG	
1990	The Gate II: Trespassers	Vision PDG	
1991	Double Impact	Stone Group Pictures and Vision International	
1992	Eyes of the Beholder		
1991	Inner Sanctum	Vision PDG	
1991	Wild Orchid II: Two Shades of Blue	Vision PDG	
1992	Sidekicks	Gallery Films and Vision PDG	
1992	Shadow of the Wolf		
1992	Sexual Response		
1993	The Hit List		
1993	Night Eyes 3		
1994	Possessed by the Night		

==== Theatrical distribution ====
Year	Title	Notes	Ref
1993	Stalingrad	Non-US release	

==== Home video releases ====
Year	Title	Catalog #	Notes	Ref
1990	Clownhouse	59103		
1991	Inner Sanctum	59703	A Vision PDG Production	
1991	Wild Orchid II: Two Shades of Blue	59823	A Vision PDG / Saunders/King Production	
1992	Almost Pregnant	59793		
1992	Shadow of the Wolf	59893	A Vision International Production	
1992	Sexual Response	51273	A Vision International Production	
1992	Sidekicks	53603	A Gallery Films and Vision PDG Production	
1993	Eyes of the Beholder	59873	A Vision International Production	
1993	The Hit List	53253	A Vision International Production	
1994	Save Me	53943		
1994	Possessed by the Night	79003	A Vision International Production	
