= Curse II: The Bite =

1989 film by Frederico Prosperi

- Directed by: Frederico Prosperi
- Written by: Susan Zelouf; Frederico Prosperi
- Produced by: Ovidio G. Assonitis
- Starring: Jill Schoelen; J. Eddie Peck; Jamie Farr; Bo Svenson
- Cinematography: Roberto D'Ettorre Piazzoli
- Edited by: Claudio M. Cutry
- Music by: Carlo Maria Cordio
- Production companies: Trans World Entertainment; Towa Entertainment; Viva Entertainment; Trihoof Investments
- Distributed by: Trans World Entertainment (U.S.); Toho-Towa (Japan)
- Release dates: June 27, 1989 (U.S.); April 4, 1992 (Japan)
- Running time: 97 minutes
- Countries: United States; Italy; Japan
- Language: English

Curse II: The Bite (also known simply as The Bite) is a 1989 horror film co-written and directed by Frederico Prosperi (credited as 'Fred Goodwin'), and starring Jill Schoelen, J. Eddie Peck, Jamie Farr and Bo Svenson. It is the second entry in the Curse tetralogy, a rebranding of unrelated films for marketing purposes.

== Plot ==
Two young lovers, Lisa and Clark, are traveling through the desert in Arizona when they unwittingly pass through an abandoned nuclear test site that has become a breeding ground for deadly mutant killer snakes. When the car breaks down and Clark is bitten, despite the best efforts from Harry Morton and the local sheriff, he undergoes a grotesque transformation into a hideous snake monster, which eventually begins to consume him. The sheriff and his deputies must track Clark in order to rescue Lisa and destroy the monster once and for all.

== Cast ==
- Jill Schoelen as Lisa Snipes
- J. Eddie Peck as Clark Newman
- Jamie Farr as Harry Morton
- Bo Svenson as the Sheriff
- Savina Gersak as Iris
- Marianne Muellerleile as Big Flo
- Sydney Lassick as George
- Terrence Evans as Dave
- Sandra Sexton as Dr. Marder
- Bruce Marchiano as Deputy Barney
- Shiri Appleby as Grace
- Ana Auther as Maria
- Al Fann as Gas Station Attendant

== Production ==
After the success of The Curse, producer Ovidio G. Assonitis and his company TriHoof Investments began production on The Bite and The Train. The Bite was originally written by Susan Zealouf and Frederico Prosperi was hired to direct. Prosperi was the son of director Franco E. Prosperi, and had previously produced his father's film Wild Beasts (1984), which had used many animal effects. As of 2020, Curse II: The Bite is his only directorial effort.

The film was shot mainly in Las Cruces, New Mexico and in White Sands National Park. The special effects were created by noted artist Screaming Mad George.

== Release ==
The film was originally to be called Reptile Man. After the film was completed, it was retitled Curse II: The Bite by the American distributors, who had also bought the rights to Beyond the Door III. The film was retitled to capitalize on the success of The Curse, also produced by Ovidio Assonitis.

=== Home media ===
The film was released on VHS and Laserdisc in 1989 by Trans World Entertainment. In 2016, the film was released on a double-feature Blu-ray together with The Curse.

== Sequels ==
The film was a success on home media and in 1991 Curse III: Blood Sacrifice was released direct-to-video. The film, starring Jenilee Harrison and Christopher Lee, was originally titled Panga. When Catacombs (1988) was released on VHS in 1993, it was given the title Curse IV: The Ultimate Sacrifice, despite not being affiliated with the series. Assonitis was not associated with either of the later projects.
