= Beyond the Door III =

1989 Italian horror film directed by Jeff Kwitny

- Directed by: Jeff Kwitny
- Written by: Sheila Goldberg
- Produced by: Ovidio G. Assonitis
- Starring: Mary Kohnert; Bo Svenson
- Cinematography: Adolfo Bartoli
- Edited by: Alberto Moriani
- Music by: Carlo Maria Cordio
- Production company: Epic Productions
- Distributed by: RCA/Columbia Pictures Home Video
- Release dates: October 31, 1989 (Italy); August 21, 1991 (U.S.)
- Running time: 94 minutes
- Country: Italy
- Language: English

Beyond the Door III (also known as Amok Train and Death Train) is a 1989 Italian supernatural horror film directed by Jeff Kwitny, and starring Mary Kohnert and Bo Svenson. It follows a young American coed who, while traveling on a train during a class trip in Yugoslavia, is targeted by a Satanic cult. It is the final film in the Beyond the Door trilogy, a series of unrelated films linked by a common title for marketing purposes. It was released twelve years after the second film in the trilogy, Beyond the Door II.

== Plot ==
A group of American students, including Beverly Putnic, travel to Yugoslavia and meet up with a local professor, Andromolek, to bear witness to a sacred pagan ritual that is only performed once every one hundred years. Back in Los Angeles, Beverly's mother is beheaded by a construction beam as she drives away from the airport after dropping Beverly off in an apparent freak accident, but a telegram to notify Beverly of this is intercepted and destroyed by the professor.

The students are all taken by boat to a remote village and are placed in ramshackle rooms that the villagers then nail shut in the night, mark with blood, and set on fire. The doors are rickety, however, so the students all escape except for one who burns up in his bed, and decide to escape from the village and hop on a passenger train. Two students are left behind when they fall from the train.

However, the train is soon possessed and is determined to reunite the young people with their horrifying fates. The driver of the train is beheaded by the cowcatcher on the front of the train, the fireman is dragged into the steam locomotive's firebox and burnt alive, and the conductor is crushed to death when the engine disconnects itself from the passenger cars and then slows, leaving the students alone on the runaway train. The evil train thirsts for blood and soon the students begin dying horrible, gruesome deaths. The two students who fell from the train are eventually run over by it in a swamp as it jumps off its tracks and then returns to those same tracks undamaged and unslowed.

The Yugoslav train authority makes some efforts to stop the train, but these efforts have no effect whatsoever. The train collides with another train standing in its way causing an explosion but without even scratching its own paint, and proceeds to zoom along until it reaches the profane altar where its own destiny is fulfilled: to deliver Beverly, who has been marked since birth for an eternity as Satan's bride.

Beverly, however, manages to have sex with an 11th-century monk named Marius who is also riding the train, making her unfit as Satan's bride. Since Marius is long since dead, he also vanishes, but not before returning to Beverly a book that her mother gave her when she boarded the plane in Los Angeles a few days prior. Beverly then returns alone to America, homesick, after her adventure of about two or three days in a foreign country. However, as the plane flies through a storm, Satan's arm crashes through the window beside Beverly and tries to drag her out of the plane. A flight attendant then wakes Beverly from her dream, who tells the airline employee, "I just want to go home."

== Cast ==
- Mary Kohnert as Beverly Putnic
- Bo Svenson as Professor Andromolek
- Victoria Zinny as Beverly's mother
- Savina Gersack as Sava
- Sarah Conway Ciminera as Christie
- William Geiger as Kevin
- Alex Vitale as Angel
- Ron Williams as Larry
- Renee Raincourt as Melanie
- Jeremy Sanchez as Richard
- Igor Pervic as Marius

== Production ==
After producing The Curse, Ovidio G. Assonitis and his company TriHoof Investments began production on two more films, with the working titles The Bite and The Train. The screenplay for The Train was written by Shelia Goldberg, who wanted to do a horror version of Runaway Train. Assonitis hired Jeff Kwitny to direct, based on Kwitny's previous film, Iced (1988). Kwitny asked James Cameron for advice, as Cameron had directed Piranha II: The Spawning in 1982. Cameron advised him not to do the film, but Kwitny had no other offers at the time, and accepted anyway.

The film was shot in and around Belgrade, Serbia, with principal photography beginning on 6 February 1989. The filming was done at a fast pace, and the cast and crew often put in 18-hour days. Because of the instability in the country, some of the labourers on the crew were paid as little as one dollar a day. Shooting with a real steam engine on an active railway line took almost three weeks. Kwitny recalled: "We had a steam train that was at our disposal that we rented from the Yugoslavian government that we could do whatever we wanted with it. We had a blast! The problem was that you'd have a scene where the real train was coming down the tracks, but then I'd need to have it back up to shoot another take, but it would take an hour, because to back up a train and to get it going again would take about an hour".

The special effects of the gory deaths and the train leaving the rails were shot in Rome by a separate unit headed up by Angelo Mattei. Kwitny was not present for the effects shooting, and has expressed disappointment in their execution: "The effects in that movie, and the train model, are just atrocious".

== Release ==
The completed film was titled Amok Train, and was distributed under this title in Europe and Asia. However, the American distributors released the film as Beyond the Door III, in an effort to capitalize on the previous success of Beyond the Door. The same distributors also bought The Bite, and retitled it to Curse II: The Bite, to create an association with The Curse.

=== Home media ===
Beyond the Door III was released on VHS and LaserDisc in 1989 by RCA/Columbia Pictures Home Video.

The film was released on Region 1 DVD by Shriek Show. Though the box art displays the alternate title Amok Train, the title card on the film itself reads Beyond the Door III.

In October 2019, the film was released on Blu-ray by Vinegar Syndrome, licensed through MGM Home Entertainment.

== Reception ==
TV Guide gave the film an unfavorable review, deeming the screenplay "illogical" describing it as "a clunky, Italian-produced horror opus [which] strains belief at every turn of its piecemeal plotting... This stodgily directed film's true star is its medieval-looking Yugoslav locations and sets."
