= Alienator =

1989 film by Fred Olen Ray

- Home media cover
- Directed by: Fred Olen Ray
- Written by: Paul Garson
- Produced by: Jeffrey C. Hogue
- Starring: Jan-Michael Vincent; John Phillip Law; Ross Hagen; Dyana Ortelli; Teagan; P. J. Soles
- Cinematography: Gary Graver
- Edited by: Chris Roth
- Music by: Chuck Cirino
- Production companies: American-Independent Prods.; Majestic Intl.
- Distributed by: Prism Entertainment
- Release date: February 8, 1990
- Running time: 92 minutes
- Country: United States
- Language: English

Alienator is a 1990 science fiction film directed by Fred Olen Ray, produced by Jeffrey C. Hogue, and starring Jan-Michael Vincent.

The film was described by Leonard Maltin and confirmed by Fred Olen Ray to be a "semi-remake" of the 1957 film The Astounding She-Monster. Robert Clarke, who starred in that film, also appears in Alienator.

== Plot ==
Kol, an alien criminal, escapes from a spaceship into the woods of an American suburb. The commander of the spaceship dispatches "the Alienator"—a deadly gynoid, to capture Kol. She relentlessly pursues Kol and a group of teenagers who find him without knowing his past.

== Cast ==
- Jan-Michael Vincent as Commander
- John Phillip Law as Ward Armstrong
- Ross Hagen as Kol
- Teagan Clive as Alienator
- Dyana Ortelli as Orrie
- Jesse Dabson as Benny
- Dawn Wildsmith as Caroline
- P. J. Soles as Tara
- Robert Clarke as Lund
- Richard Wiley as Rick
- Leo Gordon as Colonel Coburn
- Robert Quarry as "Doc" Burnside
- Fox Harris as Burt
- Hoke Howell as Harley
- Jay Richardson as Prison Sergeant Major
- Dan Golden as Electrocuted Prisoner
- Joseph Pilato as Tech #2

== Release ==
Alienator was originally set for release between May and August in 1989. Prism Entertainment announced in November 1989 to release the film along with Time Troopers in late December. Prism later released the film on February 8, 1990.

On March 19, 2013, the film was released on DVD by Shout! Factory as part of a two-disc "Action-Packed Movie Marathon" set, which contains a total of four films. On June 13, 2017, the film was released on Blu-ray by Scream Factory, featuring a commentary track by director Fred Olen Ray.

== Reception ==
From contemporary reviews, "Lor." of Variety reviewed the AIP video cassette on November 18, 1989. "Lor." declared the film to be a "tongue-in cheek sci-fi thriller geared towards home video fans with a soft spot for the old stars and old-fashioned serials." "Lor." noted the film "suffers from a weak script" that gave Jan-Michael Vincent and John Phillip Law little to do while P. J. Soles is "stuck in a rather goofy costume as an outer space technician".

== See also ==
- Cyborgs in fiction
