= Teagan Clive =

American writer, bodybuilder and actress

- Born: November 5, 1955 (age 70); United States
- Occupations: writer, actress, bodybuilder
- Years active: 1986–1990
- Height: 5 ft 8 in (1.73 m)
- Spouse: Stan Berkowitz

Teagan Clive (born c. 1955) is an American writer, bodybuilder and actress. She has appeared in various roles in movies and on television.

Clive writes articles for periodicals, including Iron Man Magazine and the Weider magazine Muscle & Fitness, and has since the 1980s. She wrote screenplays which were produced for the television series Conan the Adventurer and Acapulco H.E.A.T.

She is married to writer Stan Berkowitz.

== Early life ==
Clive was abandoned as a baby, and was cared for by a series of institutions and foster homes. In public school and college she pursued athletic curricula including baseball and varsity volleyball.

== Early training ==
In 1983, Clive began training with Don Ross at the Olympia Health Club in Oakland, California, where she told him, "I want to be the Arnold Schwarzenegger of female bodybuilding."

== Acting career ==
=== Filmography ===
Year	Title	Role	Other notes
1990	Vice Academy Part 2	BimboCop	
1990	Mob Boss	Noelle	
1989	Alienator	The Alienator	
1989	Sinbad of the Seven Seas	Soukra	
1988	Pathos – segreta inquietudine (Obsession: A Taste For Fear)	Teagan Morrison	
1987	Interzone	Mantis	
1986	Jumpin' Jack Flash	Russian Exercise Woman	
1986	Armed and Dangerous	Staff Member	

=== Television appearances ===
- The Incredibly Strange Film Show, season 2, episode 5: "Fred Olen Ray & Doris Wishman". A UK documentary program which in 1988 took a behind the scenes look at Alienator.
- Clive, not Kay Baxter is the female bodybuilder in "California Girls", the David Lee Roth music video, which premiered on MTV New Year's Eve, 1984.

== Writing career ==
=== Journalist ===
Clive wrote the "Power Café" diet column in Iron Man for 14 years.

In the 1990s Sports Illustrated hired Clive to investigate murder in bodybuilding, but she declined to capitalize on her work because her "participation in the project was met with so much disapproval" among her friends in the sport.

=== Television screenplays ===
- Acapulco H.E.A.T. "Code Name: Cult Zero" (March 13, 1999)
- Acapulco H.E.A.T. "Code Name: Bucket of Blood" (March 6, 1999)
- Conan: The Adventurer "Lethal Wizards" (May 17, 1998) (with Charles Henry Fabian)
- Conan: The Adventurer "Impostor" (November 28, 1997) (with Charles Henry Fabian)
- Conan: The Adventurer "The Siege of Ahl Sohn-Bar" (October 13, 1997) (with Charles Henry Fabian)

=== Books ===
- Body Sculpturing (Getting Strong) Anderson World Books (1984) ISBN 0-89037-304-3
