= The Further Adventures of Tennessee Buck =

1988 film directed by David Keith

- Directed by: David Keith
- Written by: Barry Jacobs; Stuart Jacobs
- Story by: Paul Mason
- Produced by: Gideon Amir
- Starring: David Keith; Kathy Shower; Brant von Hoffman; Sydney Lassick.
- Cinematography: Avraham Karpick
- Edited by: Anthony Redman
- Music by: John Debney
- Production companies: Trans World Entertainment; Sri Lanka Film Location Services
- Distributed by: Trans World Entertainment
- Release date: April 8, 1988 (U.S.)
- Running time: 88 minutes
- Countries: United States; Sri Lanka
- Language: English

The Further Adventures of Tennessee Buck (Sinhala: මිනීකන්නන්ගේ දේශය, lit. 'Land of the Killers') is a 1988 American-Sri Lankan adventure comedy film directed by and starring David Keith. It co-stars Kathy Shower, Brant von Hoffman and Sydney Lassick. In this send-up of adventure film tropes, a hard drinking pilot named "Tennessee" Buck Malone (Keith) is hired to escort a wannabe explorer (von Hoffman) and his high maintenance wife (Shower) through the hostile jungle of Borneo.

== Plot ==
Ken Manchester, a wealthy American travel enthusiast, takes his new wife Barbara on a honeymoon safari through the jungles of Borneo. Barbara would rather be at a resort; Ken wants to prove himself as a hunter. In a riverside village they are to meet their guide. An elephant stampedes and nearly kills Barbara. Down-on-his-luck American hunter and seaplane pilot Buck “Tennessee” Malone shoots the animal; it falls and crushes the Manchesters’ original guide. Buck is arrested. A magistrate offers to drop the charge if Buck surrenders a sacred amulet he wears. Buck refuses. Ken pays the fine on the condition that Buck lead the expedition. Buck’s local associate Sinanga goes with them.

They fly into the interior to hunt in territory Buck once knew as friendly. A rival tribe of cannibal headhunters has expanded into the area. The party finds beheaded guides and is ambushed. Buck, Ken, Barbara, and Sinanga are taken to the village and bound.

The young chief claims Barbara. Village women take her from a pole, kicking and screaming, into his hut to prepare her as a new wife. In the theatrical cut she is already stripped for the ritual; in a longer cut reported from a 1990s cable print and from the rough cut submitted to the MPAA, two women hold her against a wall while others pull open her shirt, then remove her belt, boots, trousers, and remaining clothes down to her underwear before laying her out. She is pinned on a bed of animal skins. Several topless women rub oil over her body in a purification rite meant to cleanse her “evil white skin” and ready her for the chief. The camera follows the massage from her feet and legs to her abdomen and breasts; one woman oils her torso while another holds her arms. Barbara writhes under their hands. The released version of the rubdown runs about a minute. The longer cut is described as roughly twice as long, with more prolonged handling of her breasts and more audible reaction from Barbara before the women stop.

Meanwhile the chief cannot take her while Ken lives. The tribesmen untie Ken for a ritual “blood hunt.” Buck talks them into releasing Sinanga as well and tells Ken to follow him. Ken will not take orders from a native, splits off, and is killed. That night the chief enters the hut, throws Ken’s severed head at the still-naked Barbara, and rapes her. In the R-rated cut the assault is shown mainly from the shoulders up; accounts of the rough cut describe a longer, more explicit version.

The chief’s mother recognizes Buck: years earlier he helped her husband against the rival Warami tribe and received the amulet. She objects to holding him. The witch doctor overrules her and challenges Buck to a fight to the death. A monkey drops fruit on the witch doctor’s head and kills him. The tribe, taking this as proof the amulet protects Buck, locks him in a cage. The chief’s mother frees him. Buck frees Barbara out of the hut and they escape. They reach his amphibious plane with warriors behind them; Buck and Barbara find Sinaga hiding safely inside the aircraft. After a chase on the river they take off. Buck circles back, drops the amulet to the young chief, and flies Barbara to safety.

== Cast ==
- David Keith as Buck Malone
- Kathy Shower as Barbara Manchester
- Brant Von Hoffman as Ken Manchester
- Sydney Lassick as Wolfgang Meyer
- Stephen Davis as Argo
- Sillaiyoor Selvarajan as Sinaga
- Pearl Vasudevi as Chief's Mother
- Sumith Mudannayaka as Young Chief
- Somy Rathnayake as Witchdoctor
- Piyadasa Wijekoon as Panang chief
- Lilani Perera as Panang Chief's Wife
- Solomon Hapte-Selassie as Tui
- Tiziana Stella as Che
- Patrizia Zanetti as Monique

== Production ==
=== Development ===
David Keith originally signed only to star in the film. When the intended director bailed out, Keith lobbied to direct as well, in what would have been his first helming effort. Photography was slated to start in the fall of 1986. However, the film ended up being delayed. Instead, Keith made his directorial debut with The Curse, another Trans World Entertainment production. In the meantime, he rewrote the original script, which was a straightforward adventure, to make it more humorous. He also added the part of the husband, which was written especially for stand-up comedian Brant von Hoffman.

The film went by the working titles Blood Hunt and Sacrifice, under which it entered production. Argentina, where TWE executive Eduard Sarlui had already made films, and Thailand were considered as locations, before Sri Lanka was chosen. Keith departed for the country for prep work on February 19, 1987, right after finishing post-production on The Curse.

=== Filming ===
Principal photography started on March 30, 1987, and extended deep into the month of June. The first part of the shoot was spent in the capital of Colombo, and the crew moved on to Kandy mid April, where they used Peradeniya Botanical Gardens and the Mahaweli River. At the end of May, the crew relocated to Ranna and its lagoon on the southern coast.

The shoot was organized by Sri Lanka Film Location Services, a local production services company owned by Chandran Rutnam, who had worked as a production supervisor on the Sri Lankan parts of Indiana Jones and the Temple of Doom. It took place in humid and hot conditions, up to 110 °F, while only five rooms at the main hotel used by production had air conditioning. During a scene where actors were tied up with vines, they developed an allergic reaction. Shower was the most affected and had to be sent all the way back to Los Angeles for treatment. For the actress' sex ritual scene, Keith consulted with her beforehand, and made sure to get through it in as few takes as possible. The film's contents generated a small controversy in Sri Lanka when some revealing pictures from the shoot were published in the Sunday Divaina, a local tabloid. The deadly Aluth Oya massacre, which happened during filming, caused some concern for relatives back in the U.S., but the crew was not affected.

Buck Malone was originally going to fly a larger aircraft, the Grumman HU-16 Albatross, but efforts to procure one fell through. A derelict Lake Buccaneer was sourced from a local businessman with only days to go before the beginning of the plane scenes in late May. It was hastily repaired, but the wing spars were broken during transportation, forcing a return to base. When it finally arrived, it was not airworthy. The external lights did not work, which attracted the attention of the Sri Lankan Air Force, the bilge pumps were defective and a gear door needed to be sealed shut with sewing thread for one take off. Yet, the production designers insisted on applying paper onto the hull to make it look even more rickety. The plane and the helicopter used by the crew were flown by local army pilots. For the takeoff scene, they were asked to fly under the Botanical Gardens' suspended bridge, but this was deemed unsafe. They flew above, and still received a stall warning when they cleared nearby Primrose Hill.

== Release ==
The film title was changed to The Further Adventures of Tennessee Buck shortly after filming.

=== Theatrical ===
TWE opened The Further Adventures of Tennessee Buck in several markets on April 8, 1988. It debuted in Los Angeles on April 29, 1988, and in New York City on June 3, 1988.

=== Home media ===
The film arrived on domestic videocassette through Media Home Entertainment, with whom TWE had an output deal, on August 17, 1988. It was accompanied by a LaserDisc from Image Entertainment.

== Reception ==
The Further Adventures of Tennessee Buck received mostly negative reviews, with most criticism focusing on its mix of mainstream and exploitation ingredients. Michael Wilmington of the Los Angeles Times wrote that "Tennessee Buck does have it over [Indiana] Jones in two areas: tastelessness and nudity. There's a smarmy, sniggery quality to its fusion of boys' adventure serial with soft-core bawdiness." He summed up the film as "an outlandishly offensive farrago of tortured blondes, wisecracking supermen and lustful depraved cannibals", and a "pathetic little porno-comic-adventure". Michael H. Price of the Fort Worth Star-Telegram concurred, finding it a "less than wholesome knockoff of the Indiana Jones variety", a "bizarre and inept jungle romp" and "a miserable jungle sleazer".

Todd Sussman of The Miami News asked, "Is it a comedy? Is it an action thriller?" He called out an "inconsistent" movie that relied on "gratuitous" nude scenes, before turning to "gore for gore's sake", and summed it up as "by far the worst jungle adventure since Bo Derek's Tarzan." Juan Carlos Soto of The Miami Herald called it "an obnoxious picture" which "may be the most offensive film ever made" and "makes you wonder why [Keith] would consider such a piece of junk". In trade publication Variety, the reviewer credited as Advo. called the film "tedious fare" featuring "a host of racial and sexist jokes of the wink, wink/nudge, nudge school of humor", and noted that "[u]sually, one has to go to a World Wrestling Federation exhibition to see acting of the class that David Keith and his entourage bring to this tale".

The Motion Picture Annual dissented with the majority opinion, calling the film "not as mean spirited as many of the other Indiana Jones rip-offs." It acknowledged that "as a director [Keith] shows some slight ability", while he portrayed "a relaxed, likeable hero and gives the film whatever charm it has", as "Shower's thespian talents are limited." It concluded that it was "little more than a live action cartoon but, accepted on that level, it can be entertaining." Leonard Maltin was also positive, opining that "[a]ctor-director Keith maintains a breezy tone, and lovely Sri Lanka locations almost distract attention from beauteous Shower."
