= Kathy Shower =

American model and actress

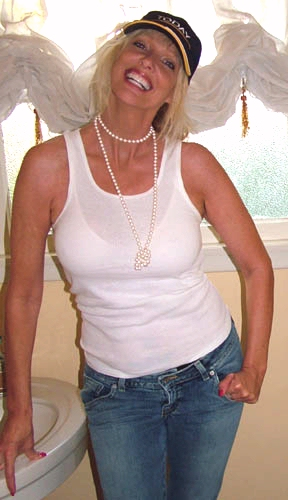
- Shower in 2005

Playboy centerfold appearance
- May 1985
- Preceded by: Cindy Brooks
- Succeeded by: Devin DeVasquez

Playboy Playmate of the Year
- 1986
- Preceded by: Karen Velez
- Succeeded by: Donna Edmondson

Personal details
- Born: Kathleen Ann Shower; March 8, 1953 (age 73)
- Height: 5 ft 9 in (1.75 m)

Kathleen Ann Shower (born March 8, 1953) is an American model and actress. Known as Kathy Shower she was Playmate of the Month for May 1985 and was later named Playmate of the Year for 1986. At that time, she was the 3rd oldest (after Dolores Donlon in August 1957 at nearly age 37 and Cindy Brooks in April 1985 at age 33) woman ever to appear as a Playboy Playmate, at age 32, as well as a single mother of two.

== Biography ==
Before and after Playboy, Shower had an acting career, mainly within the action-adventure (American Kickboxer 2, The Further Adventures of Tennessee Buck) and erotic thriller genres (Boundaries, LA Goddess, and Velvet Dreams). Shower also made numerous appearances on mainstream television, guest-starring in episodes of Knight Rider, Three's Company, CHiPs, Simon & Simon, and a 46-episode continuing role in the daytime drama series Santa Barbara. She appeared in To the Limit, starring alongside Anna Nicole Smith. In 2009, Shower completed an independent film entitled Kathy Shower: Playmate Model Mom.

Shower worked as a model for the Tapout clothing company.

At age 43, she was again featured in Playboy in a "Playmates Revisited" pictorial in August 1996.

== Selected filmography ==
- 1995 To The Limit as mob wife
- 1993 Wild Cactus as Celeste
- 1993 American Kickboxer 2 as Lillian
- 1993 L.A. Goddess as Lisa Moore
- 1990 Robo-C.H.I.C. as Robo-C.H.I.C.
- 1987 The Further Adventures of Tennessee Buck as Barbara Manchester
- 1985–1986 Santa Barbara as Janice Harrison
- 1985–1986 Knight Rider as Claudia Torrell / Tori
- 1984 Simon & Simon as Unknown
- 1984 The New Mike Hammer as Unknown
- 1983 CHiPs as Cindy / Honey Jean
- 1982 Three's Company as Millicent

Joan Bennett	Cherie Witter	Donna Smith	Cindy Brooks	Kathy Shower	Devin DeVasquez
Hope Marie Carlton	Cher Butler	Venice Kong	Cynthia Brimhall	Pamela Saunders	Carol Ficatier
