= Beyond the Door (film series) =

Italian horror film franchise

Beyond the Door is an Italian horror film series that consists of three originally unconnected films that were retitled to be part of a supernatural franchise for the English speaking markets, and one direct sequel to the 1974 original. Several loose connections between the first three films are that all three were Italian productions, Ovidio G. Assonitis produced parts I and III, child actor David Colin Jr. starred in Parts I and II (but playing different characters).

== Films ==
Film	Alternate Title	Release date	Director(s)	Screenwriter(s)	Producer(s)
Beyond the Door	Chi Sei? The Devil Within Her	November 21, 1974	Ovidio G. Assonitis and Roberto D'Ettorre Piazzoli	Ovidio G. Assonitis, Roberto D'Ettorre Piazzoli, Alex Rebar, Antonio Troisio, Giorgio Marini, Aldo Crudo and Christopher Cruise	Ovidio G. Assonitis and Enzo Doria
Beyond the Door II	Shock; Schock	August 12, 1977	Mario Bava	Lamberto Bava, Dardano Sacchetti, Francesco Barbieri and Alessandro Parenzo	Turi Vasile
Beyond the Door III	Amok Train; The Train; Death Train	October 31, 1989	Jeff Kwitny	Sheila Goldberg	Ovidio G. Assonitis
Embryo: Beyond the Door	—N/a	—N/a	—N/a	Ovidio G. Assonitis and Richard Albiston	Ovidio G. Assonitis

=== Beyond the Door (1974) ===
Beyond the Door first opened in Italy under the title Chi Sei?. American International Pictures initially expressed interest in distributing the film, but Film Ventures International ultimately acquired the film for distribution in the United States for $100,000. The cut released theatrically in the United States runs 97 minutes. It was shown as early as May 2, 1975 in Houston, Texas and became a huge box office success grossing $15 million at the box office largely due to its successful promotional campaign with TV spots and posters.

=== Beyond the Door II (1977) ===
To cash in on the success of Beyond The Door, Film Ventures International purchased the U.S. release rights to Mario Bava's Italian horror film Shock and retitled it as Beyond The Door II due to it being Italian and having a similar theme of possession. They even utilized the same successful propomotional poster design that helped the original become a success. The film was intended for a late 1977 release to capitalise on the success of Exorcist II: The Heretic, but when that film bombed at the box office, plans to release Shock in the U.S. were shelved. The film was eventually given a limited release in 1979. .

=== Beyond the Door III (1989) ===
Beyond the Door III was released in 1989. Scripted by Sheila Goldberg and directed by Jeff Kwitny, the film was shot in Serbia under the title "The Train". The film, again had no ties to either of the previous two. Ovidio G. Assonitis acted as producer on the film and financed it through his company Trihoof Investments. It is also known as Death Train and Amok Train. It was retitled to Beyond the Door III for its U.S. release by RCA/Columbia Pictures Home Video and went straight to video. Although only retitled in the U.S., all modern Blu-rays carry the title Beyond the Door III on the prints, including the Region 1 DVD by Shriek Show.

=== Embryo: Beyond the Door (TBA) ===
In 2021, Ovidio G. Assonitis announced that an official follow-up to the original film was in development. Juliet Mills was also confirmed to reprise her role in the sequel.

== Cast ==
Character
Character	Beyond the Door	Beyond the Door II aka Shock	Beyond the Door III aka Amok Train	Embryo: Beyond the Door
Character	1974	1977	1989	TBA
Jessica Barrett	Juliet Mills			Juliet Mills
Robert Barrett	Gabriele Lavia			
Dimitri	Richard Johnson			
Dr George Staton	Nino Segurini			
Ken Barrett	David Colin Jr.			
Dora Baldini		Daria Nicolodi		
Bruno Baldini		John Steiner		
Marco		David Colin Jr.		
Dr. Aldo Spidini		Ivan Rassimov		
Beverly Putnic			Mary Kohnert	
Professor Andromolek			Bo Svenson	
Beverly's Mother			Victoria Zinny	
Sava			Savina Gersak	
Marius			Igor Pervic	

== Reception ==
=== Critical response ===
Film	Rotten Tomatoes	Metacritic	CinemaScore
Beyond the Door	60% (5 reviews)	—N/a	—N/a
Beyond the Door II	63% (8 reviews)	—N/a	—N/a
Beyond the Door III	—N/a	—N/a	—N/a

=== Home media ===
Both Beyond the Door and Beyond the Door II were released on VHS through Media Home Entertainment and later re-released by their budget label Video Treasures. These releases were the U.S. theatrical versions displaying the Beyond the Door title cards. RCA/Columbia would release "Beyond the Door III" on VHS and Laserdisc.

Code Red DVD acquired the rights to Beyond The Door for DVD. The 2-disc DVD set was released on 16 September 2008 and featured both the international cut (running 109 minutes) displaying the title card The Devil Within Her and the abridged U.S. theatrical cut (running 97 minutes) displaying the title card Beyond the Door. As single disc edition only containing the international cut was also released. Code red would later re-release the international cut on blu-ray. Arrow Video later acquired the rights and released a new Blu-ray edition in the United States and United Kingdom. The 2-disc release, limited to 3,000 units, features both the unabridged international cut, as well as an exclusive U.S. theatrical cut on two separate discs. The second disc also includes Italy Possessed, a newly commissioned feature-length documentary on Italian exorcism films. The Blu-ray set was released on 7 April 2020.

Beyond the Door II was first released on DVD through Anchor Bay Entertainment. It was the international version with the Shock title card and poster artwork on the cover (though a chapter insert did display the Beyond the Door II promotional artwork). This same edition was later re-issued by Blue-Underground. Arrow Video would acquire the rights for Blu-ray release in the United States and United Kingdom and they too released the international version with the Shock title. Arrow also released a limited-edition version that came with a slip cover/"O' card featuring the U.S. Beyond the Door II title and poster artwork.

Beyond the Door III was released on Region 1 DVD by Media-Blasters sublabel Shriek Show. Though the box art displayed the alternate title Amok Train, the title card on the film itself reads Beyond the Door III. Vinegar Syndrome would later release the film on Blu-ray and features the original U.S. poster artwork and all high-definition releases contain the title card Beyond the Door III.
