= Tank (film) =

1984 film by Marvin J. Chomsky

- Film Poster
- Directed by: Marvin J. Chomsky
- Written by: Dan Gordon
- Produced by: Irwin Yablans
- Starring: James Garner; G. D. Spradlin; Shirley Jones; C. Thomas Howell
- Cinematography: Donald H. Birnkrant
- Edited by: Donald R. Rode
- Music by: Lalo Schifrin
- Color process: Metrocolor
- Production company: Lorimar Productions
- Distributed by: Universal Pictures
- Release date: March 16, 1984 (U.S.)
- Running time: 113 minutes
- Country: United States
- Language: English
- Budget: $6 million
- Box office: $11,302,884

Tank is a 1984 American action comedy film directed by Marvin J. Chomsky and starring James Garner, Shirley Jones, Jenilee Harrison and C. Thomas Howell. The film was written by Dan Gordon. It was produced by Lorimar Productions and was commercially released in the United States by Universal Pictures on March 16, 1984.

The film is primarily set in Georgia, with the main characters trying to flee to Tennessee. An aging senior non-commissioned officer (SNCO) of the United States Army comes into conflict with the local corrupt sheriff. When his son is imprisoned due to planted evidence, the NCO uses his vintage tank to liberate his son and his other imprisoned allies. He then tries to cross the state border to Tennessee. The NCO's wife has blackmailed the Governor of Tennessee into offering a proper extradition hearing to the fugitives.

== Plot ==
U.S. Army Command Sergeant Major Zack Carey is about to retire from the military from his last post at a major U.S. Army base in rural Clemmons County, Georgia. Despite being offered the post of Sergeant Major of the Army, he insists he wishes to retire in peace with his family. Several years earlier, his older son had been killed in an Army training accident, and his relationship with his only surviving son, Billy, is strained. Zack's no-nonsense, unpretentious style of leadership quickly earns him a reputation as a tough but fair NCO, well-regarded for his compassion and integrity.

Zack owns a vintage Sherman tank that he's restored with his younger son's help, and he drives it for parades and other public events. While visiting an off-base bar, he meets a young woman named Sarah. Observing their conversation, the local deputy sheriff, Euclid Baker orders Sarah to get back to work, insulting her and then slapping her. Carey intervenes and subdues the deputy.

Sarah had been forced into prostitution by Cyrus Buelton, the corrupt sheriff, who tries to arrest Carey but has no jurisdiction while Carey is on the base. Discovering that Billy attends school off-post, Buelton plants marijuana in his locker and arrests him. Zack seeks a truce and Sheriff Buelton offers to drop the charges for a hefty bribe equal to Carey's retirement savings. Zack considers the deal, but his wife, LaDonna refuses to take part in "good old boy" justice and calls a lawyer. The lawyer is thrown into jail himself on trumped-up contempt of court charges, Billy is put on trial without benefit of counsel and sentenced to several years of hard labor. Carey gives Buelton the bribe money, but Buelton refuses to release his son, stating the bribe is just insurance against "accidentally" being shot or being raped by other inmates, and only for a short period of time.

Carey delivers his resignation and climbs into his vintage tank, destroying the local police station and releasing Billy's lawyer from the jail. With Sarah tagging along, Carey drives into the county work farm to liberate Billy. He plans to flee to neighboring Tennessee, where they can get a fair hearing regarding extradition. While repairing a thrown track Carey is injured, and Billy takes command of the Sherman.

Buelton approaches the governor of Georgia in Atlanta for assistance and is politely rebuffed. He then proceeds to the Army base and demands military intervention from the post's commanding general and Carey's former superior, Major General V.E. Hubik who points out that Carey had already resigned from the Army for retirement and is no longer subject to direct military command. Buelton then threatens to call the governor of Georgia unless Hubik orders the post's personnel and tanks to pursue Carey, but Hubik cites the Posse Comitatus Act, which states that the Department of Defense cannot interfere in domestic law enforcement outside the base without approval from his superiors or the President of the United States.

The tank and crew become folk heroes as they lead police through a series of chases and evasion through rural Georgia, aided by relatives of people jailed by Buelton and who died while incarcerated, as people across the country rally behind them as modern-day Robin Hoods. On the Tennessee side of the state line, a crowd of thousands gather to welcome the tank. LaDonna has met with the governor of Tennessee, using blackmail to get a guarantee of a proper extradition hearing.

As the tank is about to cross the state line, a civilian who Buelton has deputized fires a vintage antitank weapon and immobilizes the tank in a mudflat near the state line. Zack and Billy consider surrendering while General Hubik arrives via helicopter and informs LaDonna the tank will need to be pulled out. A motorcycle gang overhearing the conversation attaches a tow cable to the tank and the assembled crowd pulls the Sherman free. Buelton orders his posse to fire into the crowd, but the Tennessee state troopers draw their weapons in response, threatening to "turn this into another 'Little Big Horn'" if Buelton and his deputies open fire. Buelton and his men try to pull the tank back into the mud, creating a stalemate. Hubik orders a bulldozer to help free the tank, and the stalemate is broken. The tank is successfully pulled over the state line where Zack, Billy and Sarah receive a hero's welcome.

== Cast ==
- James Garner as Command Sergeant Major Zack Carey
- Shirley Jones as LaDonna Carey
- C. Thomas Howell as William "Billy" Carey
- Mark Herrier as Staff Sergeant Jerry Elliott, Soldier Magazine Reporter
- Sandy Ward as Major General V.E. Hubik
- Jenilee Harrison as Sarah
- James Cromwell as Deputy Euclid Baker
- Dorian Harewood as Sergeant First Class Ed Tippet, Provost Marshal's Office
- G. D. Spradlin as Sheriff Cyrus Buelton
- John Hancock as Master Sergeant Johnson, Mess Hall NCOIC
- Guy Boyd as Sergeant Wimofsky
- J. Don Ferguson as Governor Sims
- Randy Bass as Governor's Aide

== Production ==
Tank was filmed at Fort Benning and in the small town of Zebulon, Georgia. The final tank scene at the faux Tennessee state line was filmed in southwest Atlanta, at the southeast intersection of Fulton Industrial Blvd (Georgia Highway 70/154) and Campbellton Rd. (Georgia Highway 166).

The titular tank was a 1942 M4 Sherman, made by Ford Motor Company and was owned by collector Dave Ropkey who displayed the tank in the, now closed, Ropkey Armor Museum in Crawfordsville, Indiana. The tank previously made an appearance in The Blues Brothers. This tank is now owned and operated by the American Heritage Museum in Hudson, MA.

In his memoirs Garner called the film "just a workaday movie with nothing outstanding about it. I had fun making it, though, because I got to drive a Sherman tank and crash into things."

== Reception ==
On the review aggregator website Rotten Tomatoes, 33% of 6 critics' reviews are positive.

== See also ==
- List of American films of 1984
- Harry's War – 1981 comedy-drama film where the main protagonist uses an armored vehicle in protest against the IRS's unfair practices
- Suppose They Gave a War and Nobody Came (1970 film)
