= Interzone (film) =

1987 Italian sci-fi action film

- Directed by: Deran Sarafian
- Screenplay by: James Edwards
- Produced by: David Hills
- Starring: Bruce Abbott, Beatrice Ring, Teagan Clive
- Cinematography: Gianlorenzo Battaglia
- Edited by: Kathleen Stratton
- Music by: Stefano Mainetti
- Production company: Filmirage
- Distributed by: Star Classics Video; Trans World Entertainment
- Release date: 1987 (Rome)
- Running time: 88 minutes (UK); 97 minutes (USA)
- Country: Italy
- Language: English

Interzone is a 1987 Italian sci-fi action film produced by Trans World Entertainment and directed by Deran Sarafian, with original music composed by Stefano Mainetti, starring Bruce Abbott, Beatrice Ring, and Teagan Clive.

== Plot ==
A supernaturally gifted monk, "Panasonic" (Kiro Wehara), is sent on a mission by his dying master, "General Electric," to protect the Interzone, the last fertile region left on a post-apocalyptic Earth, against an invading gang of wasteland raiders.

Along the way, Panasonic is helped by Swan (Bruce Abbott), a roguish road warrior who seeks a rumored treasure hidden within the Interzone, and Tera (Beatrice Ring), an attractive slave girl, whom Swan falls in love with. The raiders meanwhile are led by Mantis (Teagan Clive), a female bodybuilder dominatrix and her sadistic partner Balzakan (John Armstead).

After the defeat of the raiders, Swan locates the treasure which is revealed to be a fallout shelter turned archive of some of mankind's greatest achievements. Within are various items such as books, sculptures and paintings, along with a Panasonic-brand videocassette recorder that plays a final message from those who preserved the artifacts before the apocalypse.

== Cast ==
Actor	Role
Bruce Abbott	Swan
Beatrice Ring	Tara
Teagan Clive	Mantis
John Armstead	Balzakan
Kiro Wehara	Panasonic
Alain Smith	Dwarf
Franco Diogene	Rat
Laura Gemser	Panasonic's Brother's wife (uncredited)

== Production ==
It was produced by Filmirage and shot in Bracciano, 30 kilometres (19 mi) northwest of Rome, and is set in a "Mad Max" type of future.

== Distribution ==
Interzone was distributed on home video by EV in the United Kingdom in December 1989.
