= American Kickboxer 2 =

- Directed by: Jeno Hodi
- Written by: Jeno Hodi; Paul Wolansky
- Produced by: David Hunt
- Starring: Dale Cook; Evan Lurie; Kathy Shower; Ted Markland; Jeffrey R. Iorio; David Graf
- Cinematography: Blain Brown
- Edited by: Lawrence A. Maddox; Tim Spring; Paul Wolansky
- Music by: Peter Thomas
- Production company: Davian International
- Distributed by: Trimark Pictures
- Release date: August 4, 1993 (United States)
- Running time: 90 minutes
- Countries: Philippines; United States

American Kickboxer 2 is a 1993 Filipino/American martial arts action film directed by Jeno Hodi and starring former world champion kickboxer Dale "Apollo" Cook and martial artist and actor Evan Lurie. Despite the title, it is not related to the 1991 film American Kickboxer.

== Plot ==
Lillian and Howard are a couple who have an eight-year-old daughter, Susie. When a group of terrorists led by Xavier kidnap Susie for a ransom courtesy of Lillian's rich uncle, she is warned not to call the local authorities. Shocked and undeterred at the same time, Lillian decides to call her ex-husband, detective Mike Clark. When Mike is still miffed at the fact that Lillian and he had split up due to an affair she had with David Bauer, a local karate instructor, Lillian yells at Mike that he should be man enough to take care of his own daughter. However, in an even more shocking turn of events, Lillian isn't sure who is really Susie's father, Mike or David.

Lillian gives David a call to help with the kidnapping. When Mike finds David at the parking lot of a local restaurant, Mike blows a gasket and starts to fight David in the middle of the lot. Mike accidentally kicks a bystander sitting in his car when he misses David. It is clear that both Mike and David have agreed to help Lillian and pose as gardeners in Lillian's home. However, when it looks like David may be working his charm on Lillian, but it is nothing more than plain talk, Mike's jealousy gets to him again and Lillian even threatens that if they can't work together, they can't help rescue Susie.

Mike and David search throughout Los Angeles to look for Susie. Along the way, they run into goons like "Hammer", who is working for Xavier's regime. As they begin their relentless search for Susie, they slowly begin to bond but not without getting into fights themselves. In one such case, after being forced to fight each other to the delight of a crowd, they escape and then they argue and fight each other before they are ambushed by Hammer and his goons and have to settle their differences later.

Meanwhile, Susie is returned to Lillian but with a bomb strapped to her, which to her complete shock, has been set up by her husband Howard. Howard, who reveals to have married Lillian only to get his hands on the family's fortune, and Xavier have been in cahoots to split the ransom. When Howard refuses to help Xavier anymore than he felt necessary, the two go their separate ways. Meanwhile, Mike and David come to the rescue and narrowly escape after replacing water jugs for Susie's body and are shot at by Howard and his goons. Mike, Lillian, and Susie are confronted by Howard (now in a helicopter) and some men, who are shooting at them while David finds himself using his martial arts skills against more goons, including the monster Aguilar, on the beach. Mike shoots Howard down from the helicopter and Lillian escapes with Susie, only to be confronted by Xavier, who plots to take Susie for another ransom. Lillian and Xavier, brandishing a gun, struggle until it is revealed that Lillian has shot and killed Xavier, sending him to the water. At the end, Lillian, David, Mike, and Susie are happily enjoying their new lives as friends and family.

== Cast ==
- Dale Cook as Mike Clark
- Evan Lurie as David Bauer
- Kathy Shower as Lillian
- Ted Markland as Xavier
- David Graf as Howard
- Jeffrey R. Iorio as "Hammer"
- Jeno Hodi as Attila
- Greg Lewis as Uncle Francis
- Jessica Springal as Susie
- Giselle Tonggi as Susan
- Jennifer Jacob as Jo
- Albert Khodagholian as Arnaldo
- Ronald Asinas as "Frogman"
- David Smith as "Executioner"
- Jim Moss as Sheriff
- Lou Degg as Deputy Sheriff
- Emma Blake as Hooker #1
- Sara Reintaidt as Hooker #2

== Production ==
Production was shot on location in Manila, Philippines, serving as the Los Angeles area.

Jennifer Jacob, the girl appearing nude in the pool scene with Evan Lurie, was the daughter of the owner of the house where the scene took place.

== Release ==
The film was released straight to home video in the United States on August 4, 1993, from Trimark Pictures under their subsidiary Vidmark Entertainment.
