= Rage of Honor =

- Directed by: Gordon Hessler
- Written by: Robert Short; Wallace C. Bennett
- Produced by: Don Van Atta
- Starring: Sho Kosugi; Lewis Van Bergen; Robin Evans; Richard Wiley; Ulises Dumont; Gerry Gibson
- Cinematography: Julio Bragado
- Edited by: Robert Gordon
- Music by: Stelvio Cipriani
- Production company: Trans World Entertainment
- Distributed by: Trans World Entertainment
- Release date: February 27, 1987
- Running time: 98 minutes
- Countries: United States; Argentina
- Languages: English; Spanish

Rage of Honor is a 1987 American martial arts film directed by Gordon Hessler and starring Sho Kosugi.

== Cast ==
- Sho Kosugi – Shiro Tanaka
- Lewis Van Bergen – Havlock
- Robin Evans – Jennifer Lane
- Richard Wiley – Ray Jones
- Ulises Dumont – Harry
- Gerry Gibson – Dick Coleman
- Martín Coria – Jorge
- Ned Kovas – Havlock's guard
- Lilian Rinar – Havlock's girlfriend
- Hugo Halbrich – Pilot / Killer
- Masafumi Sakanashi – Prison ninja
- Kiyatsu Shimoyama – Prison ninja
- Alejo Apsega – Killer in hotel
- Ezequiel Ezquenazi – Killer in hotel

== Production ==
Principal photography on the film took place at Phoenix, Arizona and Argentina beginning in December 1985 until production was shut down for unknown reasons before resuming in February 1986.
