= Bloodbeat =

1983 supernatural film

- Promotional release poster
- Directed by: Fabrice-Ange Zaphiratos
- Written by: Fabrice-Ange Zaphiratos
- Produced by: Helen A. Boley; Henri Zaphiratos
- Starring: Helen Benton; Terry Brown; Claudia Peyton
- Cinematography: Wladimir Maule
- Edited by: Fabrice-Ange Zaphiratos
- Music by: Chris Zaphiratos; Fabrice-Ange Zaphiratos
- Production company: Huskypup Film Productions
- Distributed by: Trans World Entertainment
- Release date: March 18, 1983
- Running time: 86 minutes
- Countries: United States; France
- Language: English
- Budget: $150,000

Bloodbeat (Note: The title is sometimes stylized as Blood Beat.) is a 1983 supernatural slasher film written and directed by Fabrice-Ange Zaphiratos and starring Helen Benton, Terry Brown, Claudia Peyton, James Fitzgibbons, and Dana Day. The plot focuses on a young couple attending a family gathering for Christmas in a rural home when a spirit wearing samurai armor begins killing members of the family—two of whom have psychic abilities—and their neighbors.

The film is an international co-production of the United States and France, and was shot in Wisconsin. In October 2017, it was restored and released on DVD and Blu-ray by Vinegar Syndrome.

== Plot ==
Sarah accompanies her new boyfriend, Ted, at his family's farmhouse in rural Wisconsin for Christmas. Ted's artist mother, Cathy, immediately senses a psychic connection with Sarah that she cannot explain, which perturbs Sarah. Sarah goes with Ted, his mother's boyfriend Gary, his sister Dolly, and his uncle Peter, on a hunting excursion in the woods. Sarah becomes upset when they prepare to shoot a deer, and flees into the woods. While running through a grove of trees, Sarah is confronted by a man who has been eviscerated, and who grabs onto her before dying. Police and paramedics arrive to recover the body of the man, whom none of them can identify.

Disturbed by the incident, Sarah goes to bed early. Cathy tells Ted that she has seen Sarah before in visions. Late that night, Sarah opens a trunk to find samurai armor and a sword; Ted and Cathy find her awake in her bedroom, and assure her that the experience was a dream. Sarah, unable to sleep, momentarily joins the rest of the family in the living room. Peter drives to town, but his truck crashes. He is approached by a figure, and his throat is slashed.

Meanwhile, the family's next-door neighbors Paul and Christie are attacked by a ghostly samurai armed with a sword inside their home, while Sarah levitates in her bed. Christie is impaled in the kitchen, and Paul escapes in his van upon finding her body. When his van breaks down, Paul flees on foot back to Cathy's house, pursued by the samurai. At the front door, the family find Paul's bloodied body. Soon, the house becomes subject to violent poltergeist activity. The telephone melts, and Gary is rendered unconscious when various kitchen utensils and items are hurled at him.

Ted and Dolly rush upstairs to retrieve Sarah, and find the hall illuminated by a pulsing blue light. Ted and Dolly are then locked in a closet. Downstairs, Cathy attempts to communicate with the spirit attacking the house, while the home's lights and appliances surge wildly. After some time, the paranormal activity ceases, and Dolly and Ted are freed from the closet, while Gary regains consciousness. Outside, the samurai attacks and kills three men by a campfire. Meanwhile, in the house, Ted and Sarah have sex.

At dawn, Dolly goes to search for Ted, who has disappeared into the woods, and is attacked by the samurai. Gary and Ted both hear her screams, and Gary saves her by bludgeoning the samurai with an axe. Gary returns home with the samurai's armor, which Cathy and Dolly urge him to burn, but he refuses, telling them he must turn it into police. Moments later, Ted finds Sarah burning a photo in her bedroom with pyrokinesis, and she throws him across the room using telekinetic powers. Cathy confronts Sarah, who she finds adorning herself in the samurai armor, and realizes that Sarah is a reincarnation of the warrior. Cathy attempts to overpower Sarah with her psychic ability, but Sarah stabs both her and Gary to death. Ted and Dolly enter the room, manifest their psychic abilities and together manage to defeat Sarah before leaving the house.

== Cast ==
- Helen Benton as Cathy
- Terry Brown as Gary
- Dana Day as Dolly
- James Fitzgibbons as Ted
- Claudia Peyton as Sarah
- Peter Spelson as Uncle Pete
- Franck Miley as Paul
- Carol Wagner as Christie

== Production ==
=== Development ===
Writer-director Fabrice-Ange Zaphiratos, a native of France, relocated to Chicago in the late 1970s, and began developing his first feature film after meeting Peter Spelson, a Chicago-based insurance agent for local film productions. During this period, Zaphiratos was living with Helen Benton, a local artist, as roommates in her remote farmhouse in Wisconsin; Benton was ultimately cast in the film.

Commenting on the concept of the film, Zaphiratos said he began to develop the idea for a supernatural-themed slasher film set on a rural farm: "Little by little, I began to write the screenplay. Why set the story at Christmas? Just because I love Wisconsin the winter, with three to four feet of snow everywhere, minus twenty degrees." Zapharitos admitted to smoking marijuana while writing the script, as the owners of the farmhouse grew cannabis in one of their fields. The idea for a samurai spirit to be the film's villain came to Zapharitos after he passed by an antiques shop window in Chicago with samurai armor on display. Zapharitos ultimately purchased the armor, which was used in the film. Zapharitos secured a budget of $150,000 to make the film. Zapharitos' father, Henri, a filmmaker in France, served as a co-producer.

=== Filming ===
Bloodbeat was filmed on 35 mm in March 1981 over a period of approximately six to eight weeks. Filming took place in a rented farmhouse in Spring Green, Wisconsin, where the cast and crew also stayed. The screenplay had the film set during a heavy snowstorm, but because the film was shot in the early spring, there was little snowfall depicted.

Wladimir Maule, a then 24-year-old graduate of the Art Institute of Chicago, was hired as cinematographer. Maule believed that the film was being shot for television rather than for theaters, and thus framed the film in fullscreen rather than widescreen. Zaphiratos admitted was under the influence of drugs during filming; he has stated that the film's title, Bloodbeat, is a reference to the accelerated heartbeat experienced while high.

Zapharitos portrayed the samurai killer in the film, performing his own stunts. Because the production was unable to source sugar glass from California at the time, Zapharitos leapt through an actual glass window during the film's climactic scene, which broke into pieces and nearly resulted in him sustaining critical injuries.

=== Post-production ===
Post-production and editing of Bloodbeat took place in Paris.

== Release ==
Video Programme Distributors (VPD) released Bloodbeat on VHS in the United Kingdom in 1983. A North American release followed in 1985 by Trans World Entertainment. On October 24, 2017, the film was released on DVD and Blu-ray by Vinegar Syndrome, featuring a 4K restoration of the film taken from a 35 mm print that suffered from mold and moisture damage. The Vinegar Syndrome release also includes a commentary track by Fabrice-Ange Zaphiratos, as well as interviews with Zaphiratos and Maule. As of December 2019, the film is available for streaming on Amazon Prime Video.

== Reception ==
Writer John Stanley stated that "Fabrice-Ange Zaphiratos deserves a nod for making a gore film in which he blends psychic and slasher genres", though he noted that the gore elements are "minimal", as the film instead "goes for weirdness through music (some of it classical), enigmatic characters and a sexual link between the sister and the spectral samurai."

Michael Gingold of Rue Morgue wrote that Bloodbeat is "essentially an 86-minute non sequitur, full of odd dialogue, random characters, sudden bursts of cheesy optical-effects lunacy, sex/death juxtapositions that never make sense [...] While the movie rarely has its desired effect, it does keep you watching, just to see what bit of nuttiness Zaphiratos will pull out of his hat next." Zachary Paul of Bloody Disgusting wrote that the plot of Bloodbeat is "esoteric at best", but that it "managed to cast a spell on me that had me mesmerized from beginning to end. Like a nice fluffy blanket on a chilly winter night, the film lulled me into its grasp with every illogical turn."

Rob Hunter of Film School Rejects wrote: "I'd be lying if I said I had a clue what the hell was going on plot-wise", but noted that "the movie manages some interesting visuals along its confusing journey." Brian Orndorf of Blu-ray.com wrote that the film "has the appearance of a campy good time with a bad, bad movie" but that "it becomes a chore to watch". He lamented that "there should be a lot more consistent craziness when dealing with a film that pits a ghost samurai against an amateur painter."

== Sources ==
- Albright, Brian (2012). Regional Horror Films, 1958-1990: A State-by-State Guide with Interviews. Jefferson, North Carolina: McFarland & Company. ISBN 978-0-786-47227-7.
- Davies, Clive (2015). Spinegrinder: The Movies Most Critics Won't Write About. London, England: Headpress. ISBN 978-1-909-39427-8.
- DuPée, Matthew C. (2022). A Scary Little Christmas: A History of Yuletide Horror Films, 1972-2020. Jefferson, North Carolina: McFarland. ISBN 978-1-476-64540-7.
- Lentz, Harris M. III (2000). Science Fiction, Horror and Fantasy Film and Television Credits, Vol. 2: Filmography (2nd ed.). Jefferson, North Carolina: McFarland & Company. ISBN 978-0-786-40951-8.
- Stanley, John (2000). Creature Features: The Science Fiction, Fantasy, and Horror Movie Guide. New York City, New York: Berkley Books. ISBN 978-0-425-17517-0.
- Weldon, Michael J. (1996). The Psychotronic Video Guide To Film. New York City, New York: St. Martin's Griffin. ISBN 978-0-312-13149-4.
