= Beyond the Door (1974 film) =

1974 Italian horror film by Ovidio G. Assonitis

- Italian film poster
- Italian: Chi sei?
- Directed by: Ovidio G. Assonitis (Note: Credited as 'O. Hellman'.); Roberto D'Ettorre Piazzoli (Note: Credited as 'R. Barrett'.)
- Written by: Ovidio G. Assonitis; Antonio Troisio; Roberto D'Ettorre Piazzoli; Giorgio Marini; Aldo Crudo; Alex Rebar; Christopher Cruise
- Produced by: Ovidio G. Assonitis; Enzo Doria
- Starring: Juliet Mills; Gabriele Lavia; Richard Johnson
- Cinematography: Roberto D'Ettorre Piazzoli
- Edited by: Angelo Curi
- Music by: Franco Micalizzi
- Production company: A-Erre Cinematografica
- Distributed by: Variety Distribution (Italy)
- Release date: 21 November 1974 (Italy)
- Running time: 109 minutes; 97 minutes (US cut)
- Country: Italy
- Language: English
- Budget: $350,000
- Box office: $15 million or $7.1 million

Beyond the Door (Italian: Chi sei?, lit. 'Who are you?', also released as The Devil Within Her) is a 1974 Italian supernatural horror film directed by Ovidio G. Assonitis and Roberto D'Ettore Piazzoli, starring Juliet Mills, Gabriele Lavia, and Richard Johnson. The plot follows a San Francisco housewife (Mills) who becomes demonically possessed in the midst of a pregnancy.

Beyond the Door opened in the United States in May 1975, and became a major commercial success, grossing approximately $15 million. Critical reaction to the film was largely negative, with numerous critics deeming it an imitation of The Exorcist (1973). That film's distributor, Warner Bros., filed a lawsuit against the production company behind Beyond the Door, claiming copyright infringement. A settlement was ultimately reached in 1979.

This would be the first entry into the Beyond the Door trilogy in the United States as Mario Bava's Shock (1977) was re-titled Beyond the Door II and branded as a sequel, though it has no relation to the 1974 film other than the presence of actor David Colin Jr. A second sequel, Beyond the Door III, was also released in 1989, though it too bears no relation to the previous two films.

== Plot ==
Jessica Barrett, a young English mother living in San Francisco, reveals to her music executive husband, Robert, that she is pregnant. The couple already have two young children: a son, Ken, and daughter, Gail. Several days later, during Ken's birthday party, Robert finds Jessica violently ill and vomiting in the bathroom. After visiting Dr. George Staton, her obstetrician and personal friend, Jessica is informed that she is in fact three months pregnant, not the mere weeks she believed.

Over the course of her pregnancy, Jessica finds herself subject to violent mood swings, apparent hallucinations of voices, and poltergeist phenomena. On one occasion, Jessica is awoken by disembodied wheezing, and levitates into the air and wheezes violently all through her house. George confides in a worried Robert that Jessica's pregnancy is progressing at an unbelievably rapid rate. Fearing for her wellbeing, George arranges for Jessica to spend time with his wife, Barbara, hoping she will confide in her.

Jessica tells George she wants an abortion, but swiftly vacillates, accusing him of being a murderer when he agrees to an abortion should he find the pregnancy a hazard to her health. The Barrett household soon becomes a hotbed of supernatural activity that terrorizes both Gail and Ken when their father is away. Meanwhile, Jessica exhibits increasingly horrifying behavior akin to demonic possession, such as inhumanly twisting her head, wheezing and projectile vomiting.

Robert is contacted by a mysterious man named Dimitri, who instructs him to sequester Jessica in their house and keep visitors away in order to assure that the child is born. Jessica grows progressively ill, exhibiting a fever, stomach ailments, and other bizarre symptoms, and becomes bedridden. Under Dimitri's instructions, George has Jessica placed in a straitjacket to prevent her from violently lashing out. When George visits her, Jessica alternately pleads for his help before cursing at him in a deep, demonic voice. George has Jessica undergo a series of tests, including scans of her brain, but none of them show any neurological anomalies.

After Robert is subject to a torrent of violent supernatural behavior from Jessica, it is revealed that Dimitri is a lover from Jessica's past, and that he is a Satanist who has arranged for her to give birth to the Antichrist, in exchange for the demonic spirit having saved him from dying in a car accident years prior. In a violent confrontation between Jessica and Dimitri, the demonic entity turns on him, and implies that all of the events that have taken place were arranged for its own amusement. The entity murders Dimitri before departing Jessica's body, after which she immediately has a stillbirth.

Some time later, a healthy Jessica accompanies Robert and their children on a boat ride in the San Francisco Bay. Ken unwraps a gift he earlier acquired on his birthday, concealed in black wrapping paper with a gold ribbon. The gift is revealed to be a red toy car, the same model Dimitri crashed in the accident that nearly claimed his life. Ken drops the toy car over the edge of the boat railing, and his eyes glow green, implying he is the actual Antichrist.

== Cast ==
- Juliet Mills as Jessica Barrett
- Gabriele Lavia as Robert Barrett
- Richard Johnson as Dimitri
- David Colin Jr. as Ken Barrett
- Barbara Fiorini as Gail Barrett
- Nino Segurini as Dr. George Staton
- Elisabeth Turner as Barbara Staton
- Carla Mancini as Mrs. Francis
- Vittorio Fanfoni as Mr. Francis
- Edmund Purdom as the Devil (voice, uncredited)

== Production ==
Beyond the Door was co-directed by Ovidio G. Assonitis (billed under the alias 'O. Hellman') and cinematographer Roberto D'Ettorre Piazzoli (as 'Robert Barrett'). It was the directorial debut for both parties, Assonitis was previously a producer of genre films like Who Saw Her Die? and Man from the Deep River.

The screenplay was written by Assonitis (billed under the alias 'O. Hellman'), Piazzoli, and Antonio Troiso. A number of collaborating writers also assisted, including Alex Rebar, Giorgio Marini, Aldo Crudo, and Christopher Cruise.

=== Casting ===
Assonitis originally wanted to cast Samantha Eggar in the lead role, but his assistant Peter Shepherd recommended Juliet Mills, with whom he'd previously worked on the Billy Wilder film Avanti! (1972). Mills recalled in a 2005 interview:

I just got a call from my agent that they were making this film in San Francisco and in Rome. I had made a previous film in Rome, Avanti! with Jack Lemmon and I love working in Italy. So it really came through my agent. I read the script and I thought that this sounds like fun. I never done one of these sort of movies, so that was it. And of course The Exorcist had come out a year or so earlier, and I'd seen that. So I thought these kinds of films are popular, and why not? It was a fun film to make. Two great locations, San Francisco and Rome.

David Colin Jr., who played Ken, was the son of the founder of the American University of Rome. Said Colin in a 2017 interview, "It was a very fun time for me, very rollicking."

=== Filming ===
Exterior filming took place on-location in San Francisco, while interiors were shot on sets at De Paolis Studios in Rome. The film's special effects were designed by Wally Gentleman, who previously designed effects for Stanley Kubrick's 2001: A Space Odyssey.

=== Post-production ===
Like most Italian films of the time, the film was shot without live sound and all dialogue and foley were later dubbed in. Juliet Mills and Richard Johnson recorded their own dialogue for the English version, in the Italian version they were respectively dubbed by Maria Pia Di Meo and Pino Locchi.

== Soundtrack ==
The score was composed by Franco Micalizzi. The score is unusual for a horror film and at times seems to be referencing funk and disco music that may have been popular at the time. The full soundtrack has been released on vinyl, CD, and more recently on iTunes. The track list is as follows:

1. "Bargain With The Devil" - Music by Micalizzi, lyrics by Sid Wayne, vocals by Warren Wilson.
2. "Jessica's Theme"
3. "Dimitry's Theme"
4. "Robert's Theme"
5. "Jessica's Theme"
6. "Family's Theme"
7. "Bargain With The Devil" (orchestra)
8. "Flute Sequence"
9. "Dimitry's Theme" (slow version)
10. "Family's Theme" (slow version)

== Release ==
Beyond the Door first opened in Italy under the title Chi Sei? in 1974.

American International Pictures initially expressed interest in distributing the film, but Film Ventures International ultimately acquired the film for distribution in the United States for $100,000. The cut released theatrically in the United States runs 97 minutes, 12 minutes shorter than the international cut.. It was shown as early as May 2, 1975, in Houston, Texas.

In the United Kingdom and several other English-language territories, the film was released under the title The Devil Within Her, at the full 109 minutes.

== Home media ==
Code Red acquired the rights to Beyond the Door, releasing a DVD set on 16 September 2008 that featured both the 109-minute international cut and the abridged 97-minute U.S. theatrical cut; it also features interviews with Assonitis, Johnson, writer Alex Rebar, and Mills, as well as commentaries with Assonitis and Mills. Code Red reissued a new transfer of the film on Blu-ray in 2017.

Arrow Video released a Blu-ray edition in the United States and United Kingdom. The two-disc release, limited to 3,000 units, features both the unabridged international cut, as well as an exclusive U.S. theatrical cut on two separate discs. The second disc also includes Italy Possessed, a newly commissioned feature-length documentary on Italian exorcism films. The Blu-ray set was released on 7 April 2020.

== Reception ==
=== Box office ===
Beyond the Door was a commercial success in the United States, earning $7,122,644, with a total worldwide gross of $15 million.

=== Critical response ===
The film was panned upon release. Roger Ebert of the Chicago Sun-Times gave the movie one star out of four, calling it "scary trash".

Numerous critics compared the film negatively to The Exorcist. Bill DeIsle of The Times-Record compared the film unfavorably to The Exorcist, panning the script and also noting the special effects as juvenile and laughable. Linda Gross of the Los Angeles Times drew similar comparisons, also noting the film's score as "obtrusive", but conceded that Mills plays her role "with credibility". The San Francisco Examiner's Jeanne Miller also noted the film as being highly derivative, adding that "even with all the so-called 'action', the film is incredibly boring, especially in long philosophical rantings by Johnson about Satanic power. Director Oliver Hellman and screenwriter Richard Barrett display no trace of skill, imagination or originality. The performances are on the same level."

In the years since the film's theatrical release, the film has undergone a mild critical reevaluation with Peter Bradshaw of The Guardian awarding the film three stars and saying "there are lots of redundant and silly moments, but some disturbing and interesting stuff as well." Reviewing the film for Little White Lies, Anton Bitel remarked "Beyond the Door is too odd, too indefinable, too singular, to be dismissed as merely derivative."

=== Copyright infringement lawsuit ===
Detailing a woman possessed by a demon, Beyond the Door was labeled a rip-off of The Exorcist (1973). Warner Bros. filed a lawsuit in August 1975 seeking an injunction and $2 million in damages, claiming it unfairly competed with The Exorcist and for copyright infringement. The lawsuit was ultimately settled in the favor of Warner Bros. with the studio receiving a cash settlement from A-Erre Cinematografica s.r.l. and a portion of the film's future revenue.

== Related works ==
=== Beyond the Door II (1977) ===
To cash in on the success of Beyond the Door, Film Ventures International purchased Mario Bava's Italian horror film Shock and retitled it Beyond the Door II. The film was intended for a late 1977 release to capitalize on the success of Exorcist II: The Heretic, but when that film bombed at the box office, plans to release Shock in the U.S. were shelved. The film was eventually given a limited release in 1979. The film had no ties or connections to Beyond the Door aside from sharing one actor, David Colin, Jr., who plays a different character in each film.

=== Beyond the Door III (1989) ===
Beyond the Door III was released in 1989. Scripted by Sheila Goldberg and directed by Jeff Kwitny, the film was shot in Serbia under the title The Train. The film, again had no narrative ties to either of the previous two. Ovidio G. Assonitis acted as producer on the film and financed it through his company Trihoof Investments. It is also known as Death Train and Amok Train. It was retitled for its U.S. release by RCA/Columbia Pictures Home Video and went straight to video. Although only retitled in the U.S., all modern Blu-ray carry the title Beyond the Door III on the prints, including the Region 1 DVD by Shriek Show.

=== Embryo: Beyond the Door (2022) ===
In 2021, Ovidio G. Assonitis announced that an official follow-up to the original film was in development. Juliet Mills was also confirmed to reprise her role in the sequel.

== See also ==
- List of American films of 1974

== Bibliography ==
- Donahue, Suzanne Mary (1987). American Film Distribution: The Changing Marketplace. Ann Arbor, Michigan: UMI Research Press. ISBN 978-0-835-71776-2.
- Hughes, Howard (2011). Cinema Italiano: The Complete Guide from Classics to Cult. I.B. Tauris. ISBN 978-0-857-73044-2.
- Muir, John Kenneth (2012). Horror Films of the 1970s. Jefferson, North Carolina: McFarland. ISBN 978-0-786-49156-8.
- Paul, Louis (2010). Italian Horror Film Directors. Jefferson, North Carolina: McFarland. ISBN 978-0-786-46113-4.
- Shipka, Danny (2011). Perverse Titillation: The Exploitation Cinema of Italy, Spain and France, 1960-1980. Jefferson, North Carolina: McFarland. ISBN 978-0-786-48609-0.
