= Curse III: Blood Sacrifice =

- Directed by: Sean Barton
- Screenplay by: John Hunt; Sean Barton
- Story by: Richard Haddon Haines
- Produced by: Christopher Coy; Elizabeth Shorten Coy
- Starring: Christopher Lee; Jenilee Harrison; Henry Cele
- Cinematography: Philip Grosvenor
- Edited by: Micki Stroucken
- Music by: Julian Laxton; Patric van Blerk
- Distributed by: RCA/Columbia Pictures Home Video (1990)
- Release date: May 10, 1991
- Running time: 88 minutes
- Countries: United Kingdom; South Africa
- Language: English

Curse III: Blood Sacrifice (also known as Panga) is a 1991 horror film written and directed by Sean Barton. Although released as Curse III, it bears no resemblance to either The Curse or Curse II: The Bite and is a sequel in name only.

== Plot ==
Geoff Armstrong (Andre Jacobs) and his wife Elizabeth (Jenilee Harrison) run a large sugar plantation in East Africa in the 1950s. When Elizabeth and her sister interrupt the sacrifice of a goat by the local tribes people, the entire family becomes the focus of a curse placed by the local witch doctor, who calls forth an ancient demon from the sea to seek revenge on his behalf. As members of her family begin to disappear, seemingly victims of the ancient creature brought on by the curse and now living in their sugar cane, Elizabeth asks for help from Dr. Pearson (Christopher Lee) in the hope he may know a way to break the curse. The only way to break the curse is for Elizabeth to lure the Witch Doctor in a sugar cane field fire, where he perishes and the demon is destroyed, lifting the curse. However, the next morning Dr. Pearson discovers a bloody Panga on the beach and wonders if the monster was responsible for the deaths.

== Production ==
An international co-production between The United Kingdom and South Africa, the film was shot under the title of Panga, on location in South Africa in 1989. The film marked the directorial debut of Sean Barton, a film editor known for his work on movies such as Return of the Jedi, Eye of the Needle, Jagged Edge and The Fly II. Barton also co-wrote the screenplay. The creature effects were created by Chris Walas.

== Release ==
The film was retitled Curse III: Blood Sacrifice by the American distributors, RCA/Columbia Pictures Home Video who had also released Curse II: The Bite. The film was released direct-to-video in 1991. Internationally it has been released under the titles Witchcraft, Curse III: Panga and simply Blood Sacrifice. In 2017, the film was released on Blu-ray in the U.S. from Ronin Flix.

== Reception ==
Fangoria gave the film a negative review stating "There was The Curse, then Curse II: The Bite, and now Curse III, obvious right? Unfortunately the same brand of elementary thinking went into the plotting of this newest Curse epic." Cinema Retro called the film "not a terrible film by any means, but neither is it a lost classic". TV Guide gave the film two out of four stars saying "A well-produced, British-made voodoo thriller, Curse III: Blood Sacrifice is short on plot, but director Sean Barton admirably attempts suspense rather than gross-out bloodletting."

== Sequel ==
When David Schmoeller's Catacombs (1988) was released on VHS in 1993 by RCA/Columbia Pictures Home Video, it was given the title Curse IV: The Ultimate Sacrifice, despite not being affiliated with the series.
