= The Curse (1987 film) =

1987 science-fiction horror film directed by David Keith

- Theatrical poster
- Directed by: David Keith
- Written by: David Chaskin
- Based on: "The Colour Out of Space" by H. P. Lovecraft
- Produced by: Ovidio G. Assonitis
- Starring: Wil Wheaton; Claude Akins; Malcolm Danare; Cooper Huckabee; John Schneider; Amy Wheaton
- Cinematography: Roberto Forges Davanzati
- Edited by: Claudio M. Cutry
- Music by: Franco Micalizzi
- Production company: Brouwersgracht Investments
- Distributed by: Trans World Entertainment
- Release dates: June 13, 1987 (Paris); September 10, 1987 (U.S.)
- Running time: 90 minutes
- Countries: United States; Italy
- Language: English
- Budget: $1–1.5 million
- Box office: $1.9 million

The Curse is a 1987 science-fiction horror film directed by David Keith in his directorial debut, and starring Wil Wheaton, Claude Akins, Cooper Huckabee, Malcolm Danare, John Schneider and Amy Wheaton. Based on the short story "The Colour Out of Space" by H. P. Lovecraft, it tells about a meteorite that crashes into a farming community in Tennessee, and infects the land and its residents. Italian genre veteran Lucio Fulci was billed as an associate producer, and directed some scenes uncredited.

Trans World Entertainment and its successor company Epic Pictures used the Curse name for three more Italian-made horror films that they distributed in the U.S., although they were narratively unrelated.

== Plot ==
Teenage boy Zack lives on a farm in Tellico Plains, Tennessee with his mother Frances, younger sister Alice, stern and pious old stepfather Nathan Crane and unpleasant, dim-witted stepbrother Cyrus. One night Frances sneaks out of the house while Nathan is asleep and has sex with Mike, a farm-hand who lives in a nearby shack. Suddenly a large meteorite crashes onto the property, emitting an eerie glow. The next morning, Alan Forbes, a physician who lives nearby, visits the crash site and examines the meteorite, which is a large sphere with a hard shell from which a noxious liquid oozes out. Before long, the object dissolves into glowing gelatinous liquid that seeps into the soil. Forbes wants to contact the authorities but is dissuaded by Charlie Davidson, a local realtor and head of the chamber of commerce, who worries that the event will discourage the Tennessee Valley Authority (TVA) from building a new reservoir in the area. Forbes' bored wife Esther also manipulates her husband into keeping quiet, worried their house will lose its value.

The mysterious liquid soon begins to affect the farm. The water from the well grows cloudy and tastes unpleasant, fruit and vegetables grow invitingly large but are rotten and inedible inside, and the livestock begin to behave violently and show severe signs of infection. Alice is attacked and injured by infected chickens and Cyrus is nearly killed by a horse. Frances begins to have large boils growing on her face that grotesquely alter her features. She becomes mentally unstable, physically harming herself and attacking her own family. Believing the blight affecting his farm to be a punishment from God for his wife's infidelity, Nathan locks her in their bedroom, not allowing Zack to tell the doctor. Zack keeps himself and Alice free from the infection by consuming clean water and food he steals from Forbes' house.

Forbes secretly obtains a sample from the Cranes' well and has it analyzed at a nearby lab. The water is found to contain a strange, unknown element that alters its metabolic properties and molecular structure. Carl Willis, a TVA representative who is surveying the local area for the planned reservoir, enters the Cranes' house looking for a glass of water. Helping himself from the kitchen faucet, he has just started drinking when he is attacked and nearly killed by Frances, who has gone insane and is horribly mutating. Worried that Forbes is going to alert the authorities, Davidson and Esther arrive at the Crane farm looking for the doctor but are attacked by infected dogs who have turned feral. Esther is mauled to death and Davidson hides himself in the cellar only to be killed and seemingly devoured by Frances, who had been locked in there by Nathan. As Nathan and Cyrus examine infected cows in the shed, the cows begin to decay, revealing maggots and worms inside. The cows explode, covering Nathan and Cyrus in insects.

By now Nathan and Cyrus are also infected and beginning to go insane. A guilt-ridden Forbes enters the house, hoping to rescue Zack and Alice, but he is surprised and murdered by Nathan, who then barricades the door. Cyrus attacks Alice but Zack fights him off, hiding his sister in a closet. Nathan corners Zack and is about to kill his stepson when he is stabbed by Willis, who has just arrived. The ground begins to glow and heave beneath the house, which starts to fall apart. Zack locates his mother just in time to see her mutated corpse liquefy. As Zack prepares to leave, Cyrus attacks him, but Zack knocks him off the balcony, seemingly killing him. Nathan is knocked out by a support beam as he attempts to stop Zack. Willis gets Zack and Alice out of the house before it collapses, and a dying Nathan and Cyrus are both killed by falling debris. Willis drives away from the farm, taking Zack and Alice with him.

Some months later, a heavily bandaged Willis lies in a hospital bed, having become infected more slowly because he only drank a small amount of the farm's water. He is watching a news report on how the authorities are promising that the blight from the farm will be eradicated. Later, at a location in the nearby countryside, the ground and trees begin to heave and break apart at night, revealing more of the glowing alien liquid spreading onto the surface. A large amount of the substance appears, suggesting that the hostile mutagenic entity is still alive, by planning to complete its invasion of Earth.

== Cast ==
- Claude Akins as Nathan Crane
- Cooper Huckabee as Dr. Allen Forbes
- John Schneider as Carl Willis
- Malcolm Danare as Cyrus Crane
- Wil Wheaton as Zack Crane
- Amy Wheaton as Alice Crane
- Steve Carlisle as Charlie Davidson
- Kathleen Jordon Gregory as Frances Crane
- Hope North as Esther Forbes
- Steve Davis as Mike

== Production ==
=== Development ===
David Keith was originally hired to star in Trans World Entertainment's The Further Adventures of Tennessee Buck, which was scheduled before this film. When the intended director bailed out, Keith lobbied to direct Buck in addition to starring in it. He got his wish, but the movie was still delayed. In the meantime, he was offered to direct what would become The Curse. The project went through the working titles The Landing, The Well and The Farm. Trans World was originally looking for a farm in the vicinity of Los Angeles, but when Keith signed on as a director, he offered to relocate the production to a property he had just purchased in his native region of East Tennessee, which was accepted.

=== Casting ===
Teen actor Wil Wheaton was offered $100,000 to star. As further incentive, his sister Amy was given the chance to make her acting debut as his on-screen sibling. Wheaton did not like the script nor the financial terms but felt pressured by his parents, whom he accused of not having his best interests in mind, to accept. Actor Treat Williams was reportedly set to co-star in the film, but does not appear.

Claude Akins was the director's first choice for his part. Several local actors were cast in supporting roles. Kathleen Jordan Gregory, who made her feature debut, and Steve Carlisle were members of the Clarence Brown Theatre troupe alongside Keith. Steve Davis and Lyanne Kreslin were University of Tennessee theater graduates like the director. Keith's own father, mother and aunt briefly appear. The director, a country singer in his spare time, also hired two musician friends, John Schneider and, in a cameo, T. Graham Brown.

=== Filming ===
Principal photography began on September 29, 1986, under the title The Farm. It started with location work in East Tennessee. The main house was part of a 130-acre domain owned by Keith in Tellico Plains, called Hawkins Farm. The production headquarters were also located there inside an old department store, although the crew resided in nearby Sweetwater. Members of the rural community, which had no cinema, showed little interest in the shoot. Select scenes were also filmed in South Knoxville, and made use of Keith's parents' home.

Six weeks were spent in Tennessee, before heading to Rome for studio interiors. At some points, the production used three units concurrently. Many of the crew members, including for the U.S. portion of the shoot, were Italians billed under American names. Keith used an interpreter to communicate with them. Filming wrapped up in Rome shortly before Christmas 1986. As with other Trans World movies, budget estimates varied wildly. It was pegged between $1.1 and 1.5 million at the pre-start press conference, then inflated to $4 million around release, before Keith himself claimed to have made the film for a meager $600,000.

==== Allegations of cast mistreatment ====
Wil Wheaton alleges that during production when he was 13, he and his 9-year-old sister Amy were subjected to relentless abuse and exploitation. He claims they were forced to work 12-hour days across multiple film units without breaks, violating child labor laws, while the director was intoxicated and neglected their safety. Wil also alleges he was inappropriately touched by two adult crew members, had debris and real smoke blown in his face, and was shoved into actual cow manure for a scene. He alleges that at the direction of Lucio Fulci, Amy had live chickens thrown at her and tied to her body to peck her, and her face was deliberately cut with a scalpel.

However, comments by Amy Wheaton and mother Debbie to the Knoxville News Sentinel shortly after that scene paint a much less dramatic situation than the one described by her brother. Years later, Wil still refused to sign merchandise related to this film during public appearances.

== Release ==
=== Pre-release ===
The film was screened at the Paris Fantastic Film Festival on June 13, 1987, and two weeks later at MystFest in Cattolica, Italy. It was then still known as The Farm. Nonetheless, a purported "world premiere" was held at the Tennessee Theatre in Knoxville, on September 10, 1987, in front of about 1,500 spectators. It was the sixth movie premiere held at the venue. It was preceded by a gala at the historic Lord Lindsey building, both benefiting the renovation of downtown Knoxville.

=== Theatrical ===
The Curse opened in Los Angeles and New York on September 11, 1987. It earned $1,169,922 from its opening weekend in 326 theaters. Although Box Office Mojo lists the film's domestic gross as $1,930,001, a Knoxville entertainment columnist, reporting on a late 1987 talk with Keith, suggested that the film had brought in at least $3.25 million.

=== Home media ===
The Curse was released on VHS by Media Home Entertainment on February 5, 1988. Media also released a LaserDisc in partnership with Image Entertainment. On September 9, 2008, Metro-Goldwyn-Mayer released the film and its sequel, Curse II: The Bite, on DVD as a double-feature. Scream Factory, a sub-label of Shout! Factory, released both films as a double feature on Blu-ray on February 23, 2016.

== Reception ==
=== Film critics ===
The Curse was negatively received by the mainstream press. Doug Mason of The Knoxville News-Sentinel called it "a poorly written, clumsily edited, low budget horror film" afflicted by "cheap" effects and a finale "so poorly lit it's hard to tell who is fighting who most of the time." He concluded that "David Keith is a talented actor. Until he learns more about film-making, he should stick to playing in front of the cameras." Michael Wilmington of the Los Angeles Times appreciated the parallels between the locals' unwillingness to confront the infection and the hypocrisy of small town conservatism, and noted that the "actors are good, especially Akins and Malcolm Danare". However, he negatively compared the film to Stuart Gordon's Re-Animator and From Beyond, as Keith "never demonstrates much visual flair, tension or humor." Robert Trussel of The Kansas City Star partially disagreed, finding that Keith "clearly directs for laughs" but still showed "an uncertain grasp of the material". He deemed that an actor his standing should have known better than to kick off his directorial career with "a cut-rate entry into the hillbilly horror subgenre".

=== Lovecraft academics ===
Lovecraft scholar Charles P. Mitchell referred to the film as faithful to the author's original work, but claimed that "[t]he last twenty minutes of the film are so disjointed that they virtually ruin the entire film." In their book Lurker in the Lobby: A Guide to the Cinema of H. P. Lovecraft, Andrew Migliore and John Strysik wrote: "This third feature film treatment of [Lovecraft's] favorite story, "The Colour Out of Space", has it all... everything except good dialog, believable acting, and a cohesive plot."

== Soundtrack ==
The Curse – Original Motion Picture Soundtrack

Film score by Franco Micalizzi
- Released: June 28, 2011
- Genre: Orchestral synth
- Length: 44:10
- Label: GDM Music
- Producer: Gianni Dell'Orso

The score for the American and Italian versions of the film are different. The bluegrass-inspired music in the American release is uncredited, but press surrounding the film attributes it to John Debney. The Italian score was composed by Franco Micalizzi. Micalizzi's work was released by Italian label GDM Music on June 28, 2011, on a limited edition CD that includes a suite from Black Demons as a bonus track.

Track listing
No.	Title	Length
1.	"The Curse (Main Titles)"	1:39
2.	"Something Dark Out There"	3:33
3.	"Corn Fields"	1:07
4.	"The Deadly Farm"	2:10
5.	"Mutations"	1:22
6.	"Gate to Hell"	2:44
7.	"Night Shadows"	3:25
8.	"Demon In The Cellar"	1:30
9.	"Evil In The Farm"	3:29
10.	"Attack And Escape"	3:58
11.	"Cursed"	1:31
12.	"Evil Spirits"	5:19
13.	"The Curse (Finale)"	4:44
14.	"Black Demons (Suite)"	10:19
Total length:		44:10

== Related works ==
=== Previous adaptations ===
H. P. Lovecraft's The Colour Out of Space was previously adapted as Die, Monster, Die! in 1965. American International Pictures, who distributed the film in the United States, planned a remake in 1970 with a new screenwriter, but the project never came to fruition.

=== The Curse series ===
Unlike the first film, its sequels, Curse II: The Bite and Curse III: Blood Sacrifice, were released direct-to-video in 1989 and 1991 respectively. Catacombs, a 1988 Empire Pictures film whose rights ended up with the people behind the original Curse, was re-labeled as Curse IV: The Ultimate Sacrifice for its U.S. video release in 1993.

== Bibliography ==
- Mitchell, Charles P. (2001). The Complete H.P. Lovecraft Filmography. Westport, Connecticut: Bloomsbury Academic. p. 116. ISBN 9780313316418.
