= Shock (1977 film) =

1977 film by Mario Bava

- Italian theatrical release poster
- Directed by: Mario Bava
- Screenplay by: Lamberto Bava; Francesco Barbieri; Alessandro Parenzo; Dardano Sacchetti
- Story by: Lamberto Bava; Francesco Barbieri; Alessandro Parenzo; Dardano Sacchetti
- Produced by: Turi Vasile
- Starring: Daria Nicolodi; John Steiner; David Colin Jr.; Ivan Rassimov
- Cinematography: Alberto Spagnoli; Mario Bava
- Edited by: Roberto Sterbini
- Music by: Libra
- Color process: Eastmancolor
- Production company: Laser Film
- Distributed by: Titanus
- Release date: 12 August 1977 (Italy)
- Running time: 93 minutes
- Country: Italy
- Language: Italian
- Box office: ₤196.657 million

Shock (Italian: Schock) is a 1977 Italian supernatural horror film directed by Mario Bava and starring Daria Nicolodi, John Steiner, and David Colin, Jr. Its plot focuses on a woman who moves into the home she shared with her deceased former husband, where she finds herself tormented by supernatural occurrences. It was Bava's last theatrical feature before he died of a heart attack in 1980.

In the United States, the film was released under the title Beyond the Door II as an unofficial sequel to Beyond the Door (1974) and second entry into the Beyond the Door trilogy.

== Plot ==
Dora Baldini, her seven-year-old son Marco, and her new husband Bruno Baldini move into Dora's former home, where she lived during her first marriage to a man named Carlo. While Dora was pregnant with Marco, Carlo, an abusive heroin addict, was thought to have committed suicide at sea after his boat was found adrift. The incident resulted in Dora having a nervous breakdown and being placed in psychiatric care. With Bruno away as a commercial airline pilot, Dora is left all alone with Marco and only her shattered memory of the events of her former husband's death, caused by extensive electroshock treatment she received while institutionalized.

Marco experiences various strange occurrences in the home and is inexplicably drawn to the home's basement. Dora notices bizarre changes in Marco's personality and is disturbed to find he has shredded her underwear. Unnerved by Marco's behavior and other frightening occurrences, Dora pleads with Bruno that they move out of the house, but he ignores her. While Bruno is on a flight, Dora finds a bundle of roses with a note addressed to her from Carlo. Suspecting Marco wrote it as a twisted joke, she confronts him and slaps him in the face when he denies writing it. Dora brings Marco to her psychologist friend, Aldo Spidini, for examination. Aldo suggests that Dora's trauma from her marriage to Carlo may be triggering her to project feelings of spite or anger on Marco, though she confesses that she feels that Marco is being possessed by his deceased father.

One afternoon, Dora finds the piano playing by itself and witnesses drawings in Marco's room begin levitating but cannot find Marco. She eventually comes upon him in the den, and he asks her why she killed his father. This triggers a repressed memory, in which Dora recounts how she slit Carlo's throat with a boxcutter after he coercively injected her with heroin and LSD. Distraught over the recollection, Dora is assured by Bruno that Carlo killed himself and that her memory is only a delusion. Still, she remains steadfast that Carlo is haunting the home and possessing Marco.

Dora awakens in the middle of the night from a nightmare to banging noises emanating from the basement. She investigates the noises and finds Bruno smashing down a brick wall. Realizing Carlo's corpse has been hidden behind the wall, Bruno tells Dora that she called him for help after murdering Carlo seven years ago. Wanting to save her from prison, Bruno hid Carlo's body in the house and released his boat to sea, staging his disappearance as a possible suicide. Bruno explains that they had to return to the home so that Carlo's remains wouldn't have been discovered, which would have happened had they sold it; he then tells her once he has transferred the remains elsewhere, they can leave. In an abrupt but frenetic blind rage, Dora swings a pickaxe at Bruno, impaling him in the chest and subsequently stuffs his corpse in the open wall along with Carlo's.

Dora runs upstairs to search for Marco but finds a ghoulish apparition of Carlo lying in his bed. Then in the hallway, Marco subsequently appears and starts running towards her but suddenly transforms into Carlo as he embraces her, causing Dora to scream with terror. Dora tries to flee from the house but encounters violent poltergeist activity that prevents her from doing so. She returns to the basement, where all the furniture in the house moves toward her and she finally slashes her own throat with a boxcutter while Carlo's hand is holding the knife. Outside later, Marco sits at a table in the backyard, having tea with his father's invisible ghost. He then proceeds to push the ghost on the tree swing.

== Cast ==
- Daria Nicolodi as Dora Baldini
- John Steiner as Bruno Baldini
- David Colin Jr. as Marco
- Ivan Rassimov as Dr. Aldo Spidini
- Nicola Salerno as Carlo (uncredited)

== Production ==
Following a series of failed ventures or incomplete works such as Rabid Dogs and Baby Kong, Mario Bava's son Lamberto Bava continued to push his father into making new film work, which led to the creation of Shock. The original script for Shock was written by Dardano Sacchetti and Francesco Barbieri in the early 1970s following their work on A Bay of Blood. The script's original title was Al 33 di via Orologio fa sempre freddo ("It's always cold at 33 Clock Street"), and was loosely based on the novel The Shadow Guest by Hillary Waugh. In 1973, Bava did pre-production work for this script with Mimsy Farmer doing a screen test for the leading part. This project was later shelved. Lamberto Bava would later return to the script and worked on it with Rabid Dogs co-writer Alessandro Parenzo, who was credited in the film as Paolo Brigenti. Lamberto stated that he and Sacchetti wanted to make a "modern" horror film, and were inspired by the works of Stephen King.

The film went into production in 1977 and was shot over a period of five weeks. Mario let Lamberto direct some scenes in the film based on Mario's storyboards. Lamberto's official credit for directing is "Collaboration to the direction".

The musical score in the film was composed by the group Libra, with Carlo Pennisi on guitar, Alessandro Centofanti on keyboards, Dino Cappa on bass, and Walter Martino on drums. It was the group's last recording before breaking up later that year.

== Release ==
Shock was released in Italy on 12 August 1977 where it was distributed by Titanus. One of the film's promotional posters utilised artwork adapted (without credit) from William Teason's cover design for Popular Library's paperback edition of the Shirley Jackson novel We Have Always Lived in the Castle. It grossed a total of 196,657,000 Italian lire on its domestic release.

In the United States, Film Ventures International re-titled the film as Beyond the Door II, presented as a sequel to Ovidio Assonitis's 1974 possession film, Beyond the Door; however, the films were not linked in narrative or content aside from sharing the same child actor David Colin, Jr., and Film Ventures' decision to change the title was solely for marketing purposes in America.

== Critical reception ==
Linda Gross of the Los Angeles Times deemed Shock a "slowly paced and silly tale of demonic possession", though she noted that "to Bava's credit, he uses more Oedipal implications than mechanical gimmickry". Daniel Ruth of The Tampa Tribune wrote of the film: "Director Mario Bava seems to have made a movie that neither shocks, nor surprises. Doors creak with predictability. Screams come dutifully on cue and the blood pours in countless pints". Bob Freund of the Fort Lauderdale News was also critical of the film, deeming it "an incredible hulk of wasted film stock", negatively comparing it to The Exorcist and The Omen.

From a contemporary review, Scott Meek (Monthly Film Bulletin) described the film as "only a minor work from a past master of Italian commercial cinema, this shocker shows flashes of real style and of effectively sardonic humour". The review concluded that "The post-Exorcist possession crazy is now so burdened with inferior product that it is a pity that Bava's contribution should have been delayed in reaching Britain. It proves, despite its faults, a good deal more entertaining than many of its American bedfellows".

From retrospective reviews, AllMovie called it "perhaps one of the more conventional offerings from a man whom many consider the founding father of Italian horror", though it "still bears the trademark style and technical trickery of Mario Bava's previous efforts". Film scholar Howard Hughes wrote of the film: "Though Shock appears to be yet another grainy, low-budget 1970s horror rip-off, it is made with some style", also deeming Nicolodi's performance the best of her career.
