= Jenilee Harrison =

American actress (b. 1958)

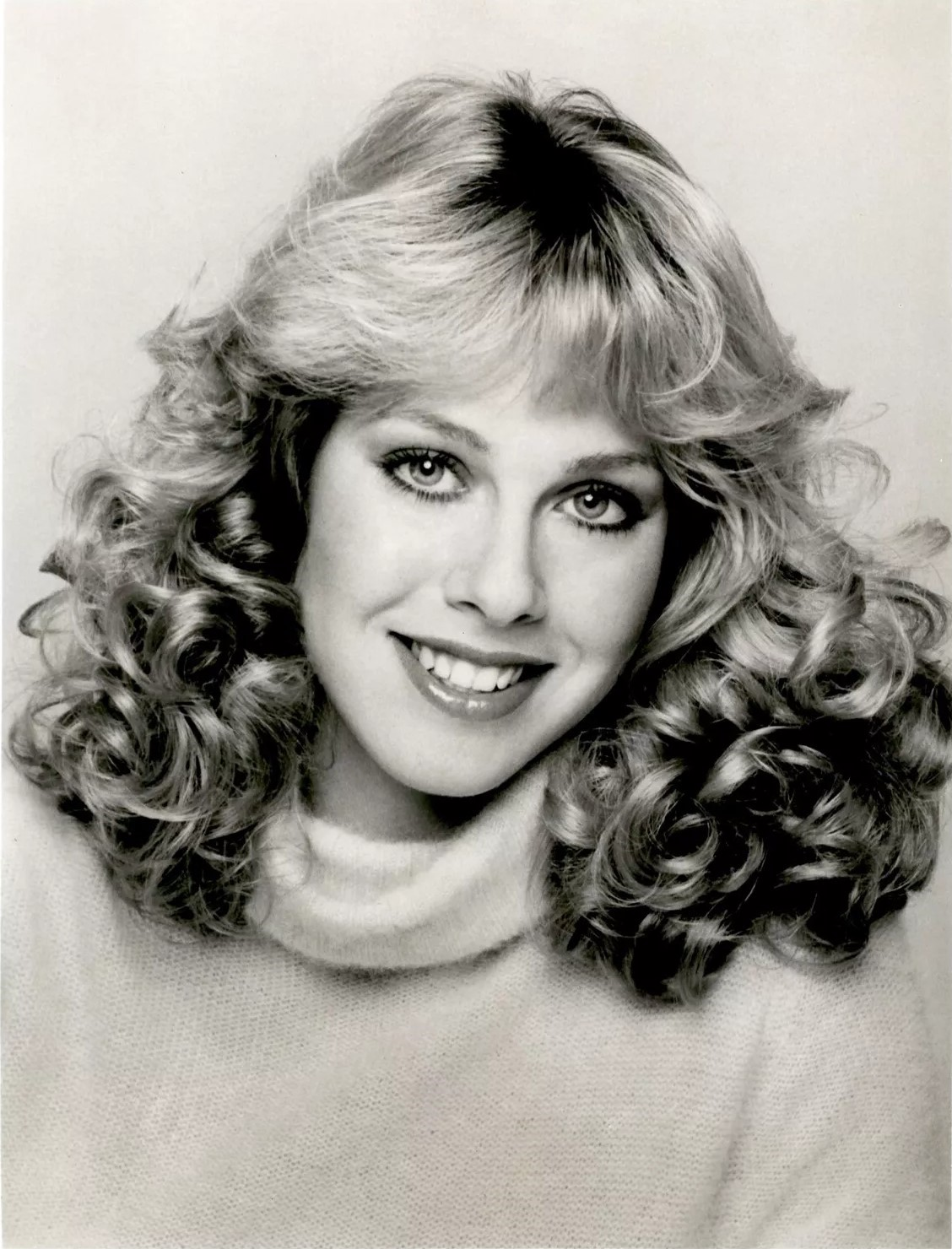
- Harrison in an ABC television press photograph promoting Three's Company, early 1981
- Born: June 12, 1958 (age 68)
- Occupations: Actress; cheerleader
- Years active: 1978–2002
- Known for: Three's Company; Dallas
- Spouse: Bruce Oppenheim (m. 1993; div. 2022)

Jenilee Harrison (born June 12, 1958) is a retired American actress who appeared as Cindy Snow, a cousin of and replacement for blonde roommate Chrissy Snow on the hit sitcom Three's Company, between 1980 and 1982. She went on to play Jamie Ewing Barnes on Dallas from 1984 to 1986.

== Career ==
Before breaking into show business, Harrison was a cheerleader from 1978 to 1980 for the Los Angeles Rams.

Harrison was just 21 when she landed the role of Cindy on Three's Company after Suzanne Somers asked for a raise in salary and her role was reduced. Both Harrison and Somers suffered in popularity. As a result, Priscilla Barnes was cast as Terri permanently replacing Somers, while Harrison was made a supporting cast member and disappeared from the series after two and a half seasons, with producers saying she was too "inexperienced and unseasoned". This period of her life was later dramatized in the television movie Behind the Camera: The Unauthorized Story of Three's Company (2003) with Liz Crawford playing Harrison. In a 1982 interview with show-business writer Richard Mortlock, Harrison claimed that she left Three's Company of her own accord.

After Three's Company, Harrison continued with her acting career, appearing in the feature film Tank and the television series Dallas in which she played Jamie Ewing Barnes for two years. She reunited with her former Three's Company co-stars Suzanne Somers and Don Knotts in a guest starring role on She's the Sheriff in 1988. She performed with another Three's Company co-star Richard Kline in dinner theater for the play Shear Madness in Canada in 1992.

She left show business in 2002 to focus on her real estate investments, caring for animals and car racing. In 2017, she reunited with some of the surviving stars of Three's Company for the show's 40th anniversary celebration on Antenna TV.

== Personal life ==
In the early 1980s, Harrison dated L.A. Rams guard Dennis Harrah and Major League Baseball star Reggie Jackson.

In 1993, Harrison married Dr. Bruce Oppenheim, a Los Angeles–area chiropractor and the ex-husband of actress Cybill Shepherd. Oppenheim and Harrison divorced in 2022.

In 2026, Jenilee Harrison launched her official website, Jenileeharrison.com, dedicated to offering memorabilia and items from her farm shop. She also established her Facebook presence through the Jenilee Harrison page. From there, she operates “Jenilee Harrison’s The Farmies,” a subscription-based Facebook group devoted to spreading kindness, consideration, and love for all living things by encouraging members to “plant seeds of kindness” in their daily lives.

== Filmography ==
Year	Title	Role	Notes
1978	CHiPs	Cheerleader	Episode: "High Flyer"
1979	240-Robert	College Girl / Jill	Episodes: "Stuntman" and "The Applicant"
1980–82	Three's Company	Cindy Snow	Main cast (32 episodes)
1981	The Love Boat	Connie Wilker	Episodes: "The Three R's" (Parts 1 & 2)
1981	Fantasy Island	Ginger Donovan	Episode: "Slam Dunk"
1981	Battle of the Network Stars X	Herself - ABC Team	TV special
1982	Fantasy Island	Jenny Ryan	Episode: "Natchez Bound"
1983	The Love Boat	Erica Dupont	Episode: "Here Comes the Bride - Maybe"
1983	Malibu	Cindy	TV movie
1983	Bring 'Em Back Alive	Stacey	Episode: "The Shadow Women of Chung Tai"
1984	Fantasy Island	Barbara Jessup	Episode: "Games People Play"
1984	The Love Boat	Sheila	Episode: "The Babymakers"
1984	The New Mike Hammer	Shelley Steele	Episode: "Shots in the Dark"
1984	Tank	Sarah	
1984–86	Dallas	Jamie Ewing	Main cast (69 episodes)
1985	Battle of the Network Stars XVIII	Herself - CBS Team	TV special
1985	Super Password	Herself - celebrity contestant	Season 2, Episodes 11–15, 84–88, and 198–201
1986	Simon & Simon	Jennifer Tucker	Episode: "Just Because I'm Paranoid"
1987	The Love Boat: Who Killed Maxwell Thorn?	Sarah York	TV movie
1987	Hotel	Brenda Thompkins	Episode: "Class of '72"
1987	The New Mike Hammer	Maggie	Episode: "Lady Killer"
1987	Murder, She Wrote	Serena	Episode: "The Way to Dusty Death"
1988	She's the Sheriff	Grace	Episode: "Hair"
1991	They Came from Outer Space	Dr. H.J. Pretzel	Episode: "Play Doctor"
1991	Curse III: Blood Sacrifice	Elizabeth Armstrong	Alternative title: Panga
1991	Prime Target	Kathy Bloodstone	
1992	Illicit Behavior	Charlene Lernoux	
1995	Karate Tiger 8: Fists of Iron	Julie Weaver	
1999	AbSlide		TV movie
1999	That '70s Show	Carol	Episode: "Red's Birthday"
2000	The Redemption	Sarah Snyder	
2002	The Power	Hillary	TV movie
