= Catacombs (1988 film) =

1988 Italian film by David Schmoeller

- Directed by: David Schmoeller
- Written by: David Schmoeller
- Produced by: Hope Perello; Charles Band
- Starring: Tim Van Patten; Ian Abercrombie; Laura Schaefer
- Cinematography: Sergio Salvati
- Edited by: Thomas Meshelski
- Music by: Pino Donaggio
- Distributed by: Empire Pictures
- Release dates: May 14, 1988 (Cannes Film Festival); March 24, 1993 (United States)
- Running time: 84 minutes
- Country: Italy
- Language: English

Catacombs (also known as Curse IV: The Ultimate Sacrifice) is a 1988 Italian horror film directed by David Schmoeller and starring Tim Van Patten, Ian Abercrombie, and Laura Schaefer.

== Plot ==
In the 17th century, an order of monks in Italy capture and entomb a demon that has possessed a member of their group. 400 years later, school teacher Elizabeth Magrino (Laura Schaefer) visits the monastery in order to do some research. What she and the current monks do not realize is that the evil hiding within the catacombs has been released.

== Cast ==
- Tim Van Patten as Father John Durham
- Ian Abercrombie as Brother Orsini
- Jeremy West as Brother Marinus
- Laura Schaefer as Elizabeth Magrino
- Vernon Dobtcheff as Brother Timothy
- Feodor Chaliapin Jr. as Brother Terrel
- Brett Porter as Possessed Albino
- Michael Pasby as Jesus Christ

== Release ==
The film was the last officially completed film by Empire Pictures before the company was seized by Crédit Lyonnais for failure to pay on loans. As a result, the film's release was delayed for five years. It was eventually given the new title Curse IV: The Ultimate Sacrifice by Columbia TriStar Home Video and was released direct-to-video on VHS in 1993, though it is unconnected to the 1987 film The Curse and its two sequels.

On October 29, 2013, Scream Factory released the film on DVD for the first time, along with Contamination .7, The Dungeonmaster and Cellar Dweller as part of the second volume of their Scream Factory All-Night Horror Marathon series. They later re-released the film with Cellar Dweller on a double-feature Blu-ray.
