= Miranda Wilson =

American actress (born 1960)

- Born: Cheryl-Ann Wilson; September 10, 1960 (age 66); Omaha, Nebraska, U.S.
- Other names: Cheryl-Ann Wilson; Miranda Lassalle
- Years active: 1984–present
- Spouse: Richard Lassalle (m. 1990)
- Children: 2

Miranda Wilson, also known as Cheryl-Ann Wilson, (born September 10, 1960) is an American actress and dialect coach. She is best known for her role as the villainess Megan Hathaway DiMera on the NBC soap opera, Days of Our Lives.

== Early life ==
Cheryl-Ann Wilson was born in Omaha, Nebraska. In high school, Wilson had the opportunity to perform in nine stage productions. After high school, Miranda did a four-year Fine Arts degree at University of California, Santa Barbara, majoring in Theatre Arts with an Acting emphasis.

== Career ==
Wilson began her career in 1984 after she won the role of Megan Hathaway, the high-school sweetheart of Bo Brady, in the popular soap opera, Days of Our Lives. Megan gained notoriety when it was revealed that the character was actually Megan DiMera, the daughter of the supervillain, Stefano DiMera. After Megan was killed off, Wilson was approached by John Conboy the producer of Capitol and asked to audition for the contract role of Kate Wells, working mainly opposite the rugged hero of the 50's and 60's cinema, Richard Egan. Kate became a pivotal villainess bringing the show to one of its climatic cliffhangers at the time the show was cancelled.

Wilson next appeared along with her ‘Capitol’ co-star Debrah Farentino, in the 1987 horror film Cellar Dweller which has since become a cult classic.

Next Wilson was cast as the psychic Sandra Mills on the soap opera Santa Barbara. She played opposite A. Martinez while his main onscreen partner, Marcy Walker, was on maternity leave. While Sandra was loathed by fans for pursuing Cruz, she was more deeply troubled and misunderstood than strictly a villainess.

In-between her contract roles on the soaps Wilson had guest starring roles on several popular TV series. On T. J. Hooker she worked with William Shatner. On Trapper John, M.D. she had a role playing opposite with Timothy Busfield in a storyline as a new mother. On Wolf, Wilson was again cast as the villainess who ended up chasing down Jack Scalia on horseback while murderously swinging a machete.

On Life Is Wild, Wilson played the mother of the protagonist and was thrilled to spend two weeks filming on the savanna in South Africa, where she met some of the planet's coolest members of the animal kingdom - leopards, lions, giraffe, meerkats, hyenas and stripy zebras to name but a few. After leaving Hollywood to start a family, she moved to France. Before taking a child rearing hiatus Wilson was cast in a TV guest star role in Histories d’Amour which she performed in French.

When Wilson was returning to her career post childrearing, the first film she was cast in was High Strung, directed by fellow soap actor, Michael Damian.

In recent years Wilson starred in the acclaimed short film An American Attorney in London. The film won a number of awards on the film festival circuit, both for the film and for Wilson as the lead actress. It was this film that led producer/director Otto Bathurst to cast Wilson in the recurring role of Penma in the television adaptation of the popular video game, Halo.

In 2022, Wilson reprised her role as Megan Hathaway for the spin-off series, Days of Our Lives: Beyond Salem, in which she acted as the primary villain. In 2023, she reprised her role on the main series with a 33-episode run that ended with a cliffhanger, keeping the door open for her to return at some point in the future.

== Personal life ==
In her late twenties, Cheryl-Ann changed her name to Miranda. In 1990, Wilson married Englishman and production designer, Richard Lassalle. The couple had two children and raised them in England. During this time, Wilson co-founded and project managed a holistic primary school in Lewes, East Sussex, along with a handful of like-minded friends and educators. The school was a great success with all of the children and families who attended over the 18 years it was open. Wilson has since divorced and lives a very full life in the south of England.

== Filmography ==
=== Film ===
Year	Title	Role	Notes
1987	Cellar Dweller	Lisa	
2014	Beneath Water	Sue	Short film
2015	Shamitabah	BBC Journalist	
2016	High Strung	Mary	
2017	An American Attorney in London	Porter	

=== Television ===
Year	Title	Role	Notes
1984-1985, 2023	Days of Our Lives	Megan Hathaway DiMera	Series regular, 100+ episodes
1986	Capitol	Kate Wells	100+ episodes
1989	Santa Barbara	Sandra Mills	73 episodes
1989	Wolf	Samantha	Guest star
1991	Histoires d’Amour	Linda	Guest star
2007	Life Is Wild	Mrs. Griffin	Guest star
2017	Wallis: The Queen That Never Was	Bessie Merryman	
2022	Halo	Penma	2 episodes
2022	Days of Our Lives: Beyond Salem	Megan Hathaway DiMera	5 episodes
2022	FBI: International	Erin Potter	Guest star

== Awards and nominations ==
Year	Award	Category	Work	Result	Ref.
1985	Soap Opera Digest Awards	Outstanding Villainess in a Daytime Serial	Days of Our Lives	Won	
2018	Red Dirt International Film Festival	Best Supporting Actress	An American Attorney in London	Won	
2015	Queens World Film Festival	Best Actress - Narrative Short	Beneath Water	Won	
2018	Milwaukee Twisted Dreams Festival	Best Supporting Actress in a Short Film	An American Attorney in London	Won	
2018	Cinema on the Bayou Film Festival	Outstanding Acting Award	An American Attorney in London	Won	
