= List of The Streets of San Francisco episodes =

TV series Episodes

This is a list of episodes for the television series The Streets of San Francisco, which ran from 1972 to 1977; a Made-for-TV-movie sequel aired in 1992.

== Series overview ==
Season	Episodes	Originally released		Nielsen Ratings
Season	Episodes	First released	Last released	Nielsen Ratings
Pilot		September 16, 1972		N/A
1	26	September 23, 1972	April 12, 1973	#56/ 15.5 rating
2	23	September 13, 1973	March 14, 1974	#22/ 20.8 rating
3	23	September 12, 1974	March 13, 1975	#22/ 21.3 rating
4	23	September 11, 1975	March 18, 1976	#26/ 20.7 rating
5	24	September 30, 1976	June 9, 1977	#52/ 18.0 rating
Television film		January 27, 1992		TBA

== Pilot (1972) ==
Title	Directed by	Written by	Original release date
"The Streets of San Francisco"	Walter Grauman	Edward Hume	September 16, 1972
SFPD Detective Lieutenant Michael Stone (Karl Malden) is partnered with a young college-educated Inspector, Steven Keller (Michael Douglas), as they investigate a girl (Kim Darby) found dead in the bay, with ties to a lawyer (Robert Wagner) she knew as the primary suspect. With Andrew Duggan, Tom Bosley, John Rubinstein, Carmen Mathews, Edward Andrews, and Lawrence Dobkin. The pilot was originally a made-for-TV movie, and was split into two parts for syndication.

== Episodes ==
=== Season 1 (1972–73) ===
No. overall	No. in season	Title	Directed by	Written by	Original release date
1	1	"The Thirty Year Pin"	Bernard L. Kowalski	Robert Lewin	September 23, 1972
A thirty-year veteran beat cop and longtime friend of Stone's is shot during an attempted robbery. Stone sets off with a vendetta to get the gunman, blurring the line between professional and personal. With Edmond O'Brien, Tim O'Connor, David Opatoshu, and Eileen Heckart.
2	2	"The First Day of Forever"	Walter Grauman	Robert W. Lenski	September 30, 1972
A would-be Jack the Ripper stalks the city, slashing prostitutes to death. Stone assigns a reluctant Keller with protecting a prostitute who has been threatened. With Janice Rule and James Olson.
3	3	"45 Minutes from Home"	Walter Grauman	Robert I. Holt	October 7, 1972
A salesman from Los Angeles attending a convention wrongly feels responsible for the death of a female hitchhiker. (The title refers to the time it takes to fly from LA to San Francisco.) With William Windom and Dick van Patten.
4	4	"Whose Little Boy Are You?"	Walter Grauman	Story by : Donn Mullally; Teleplay by : Cliff Gould	October 14, 1972
A Vietnam veteran goes AWOL from the army in order to kidnap the son he has never seen. With James Stacy and Linda Marsh.
5	5	"Tower Beyond Tragedy"	Walter Grauman	Morton S. Fine	October 28, 1972
Stone and Keller uncover the seedy world of escort services when their suspect is a cultured art collector with a Pygmalion complex who hires escorts, determined to create in them his idealized woman. With Stefanie Powers, Edward Mulhare, and Vic Tayback.
6	6	"Hall of Mirrors"	Arthur H. Nadel	Walter Black	November 4, 1972
Stone is sidelined with a broken ankle, so Keller teams up with hot-headed Inspector Jim Martin to track down a young Mexican suspected of murder. Martin's prejudice threatens the investigation. With David Soul and A Martinez.
7	7	"Timelock"	Robert Douglas	Story by : Charles McDaniel; Teleplay by : Charles McDaniel, Cliff Gould and John Wilder	November 11, 1972
When a parolee whom Stone once coached in the Police Athletic League is accused of murdering another ex-con, Stone, Keller and a caring social worker rally to his defense. With Peter Strauss, Bernie Casey, and Elaine Giftos.
8	8	"In the Midst of Strangers"	Robert Douglas	Del Reisman	November 25, 1972
When a corner newspaper vendor goes after the muggers who stole his life savings, Stone and Keller discover that the crime is linked to the murder of a housing commissioner. With David Wayne, Ramon Bieri, and Robert Foxworth.
9	9	"The Takers"	Arthur H. Nadel	Guerdon Trueblood, Cliff Gould and John Wilder	December 2, 1972
Two young women are found murdered in a swinging singles apartment complex. As Stone and Keller investigate, they uncover multiple suspects with a motive to murder the two gold-digging, teasing "takers." With Harold Gould, Michael Lerner, and Vic Tayback.
10	10	"The Year of the Locusts"	Arthur H. Nadel	Theodore J. Flicker	December 9, 1972
A band of modern-day Gypsies descends on San Francisco, its aging patriarch unaware that the younger generation has moved on from the traditional flim-flam to million-dollar heists and murder. With George Voskovec and Michael Ansara.
11	11	"The Bullet"	Walter Grauman	Story by : Barry Trivers; Teleplay by : Barry Trivers, Cliff Gould and John Wilder	December 16, 1972
A college professor, shot accidentally while trying to pay off a blackmailer, refuses to cooperate with Stone's investigation for fear that the publicity will lose him an upcoming promotion. With Carl Betz and Geraldine Brooks.
12	12	"Bitter Wine"	Christian Nyby	Story by : Hal Sitowitz; Teleplay by : Hal Sitowitz and John Wilder	December 23, 1972
A man who served twelve years in prison to protect his brother gets out only to find that the brother never told their father, a Greek restaurant owner, the truth about who should have gone to jail. With Paul Michael Glaser, Scott Marlowe, and Nehemiah Persoff.
13	13	"A Trout in the Milk"	Lawrence Dobkin	Robert M. Young	January 6, 1973
An artist is thrown to his death from his apartment window. Stone and Keller's investigation centers on the daughter of a renowned eccentric poet. With Roscoe Lee Browne and Brenda Sykes.
14	14	"Deathwatch"	Walter Grauman	Story by : Harry Kronman; Teleplay by : Harry Kronman, John Groves and Cliff Gould	January 13, 1973
Two crusty fishermen at sea stumble upon an illegal alien smuggling ring. The smugglers murder one of the fishermen and pressure the second into silence, stymieing Stone and Keller's investigation. With Nicholas Colasanto, Anthony Caruso, and Victor French.
15	15	"Act of Duty"	Lawrence Dobkin	Robert M. Young	January 18, 1973
In her zeal to capture a serial rapist, a rookie cop flouts Stone's orders, jeopardizing not only Stone and Keller's carefully choreographed stakeout but her own life. With Brenda Vaccaro and Michael Burns.
16	16	"The Set-up"	George McCowan	Douglas Roberts	January 25, 1973
A hit man living a new life with a family in France is lured out of retirement by his former employer, a crime kingpin determined to rub out every witness to a murder he committed. With Stuart Whitman, Jack Albertson, Jason Evers, and Claudine Longet.
17	17	"A Collection of Eagles"	Walter Grauman	Robert I. Holt	February 1, 1973
A greed-consumed coin collector plots to switch a wealthy collector's gold double eagle coins with counterfeits, using and abusing his trusting accomplices along the way. With Joseph Cotten, John Saxon, and Belinda Montgomery. Jamie Farr appears in the first act as a courier for the collector.
18	18	"A Room With a View"	Walter Grauman	Del Reisman	February 8, 1973
A war among gambling bosses is being waged. Stone and Keller attempt to protect a witness from a hit man who has charmed his way into a lonely teacher's apartment to secure a clear shot at his victim. With Steve Forrest, Shirley Knight, Richard Anderson, and Michael Strong.
19	19	"Deadline"	Seymour Robbie	David Friedkin	February 15, 1973
A newspaper columnist and longtime friend of Stone's accidentally kills his young, two-timing mistress and then attempts to pin the rap on a young actor she was seeing. With Barry Sullivan, Geoffrey Deuel, Greg Mullavey, and Tommy Kirk.
20	20	"Trail of the Serpent"	John Badham	Cliff Gould and John Wilder	February 22, 1973
After killing a policeman while fleeing from a grocery store robbery, a gang called the Cobras takes Stone hostage. They want to trade him for their captured leader. With Tim O'Connor, Cal Bellini, and Brian Tochi.
21	21	"The House on Hyde Street"	Walter Grauman	Story by : Cliff Osmond; Teleplay by : John Wilder	March 1, 1973
Three young boys open a Pandora's Box when they sneak into an eccentric old man's home, a mysterious house rumored by their parents to contain a million-dollar treasure, rumored by neighbors to stay away because they believed him to be a child molester, and because of a murder that took place 30 years earlier at the house. What they find leads to suspicion when one of the boys is trapped inside the house with a person the old man has locked up in his room. With Lew Ayres, Albert Salmi, Clint Howard, and Joyce Van Patten.
22	22	"Beyond Vengeance"	Virgil W. Vogel	Robert M. Young	March 8, 1973
A homicidal rapist that Stone had put away twelve years earlier is released and begins waging psychological warfare on Stone by stalking his daughter Jeannie. With Joe Don Baker and Darlene Carr.
23	23	"The Albatross"	Robert Day	Story by : Cliff Gould; Teleplay by : Cliff Gould and John Wilder	March 15, 1973
A child is murdered in a bungled burglary and the killer is set free on a legal technicality. Despite Stone's strenuous objections, the grieving father is determined to take justice into his own hands. With Ed Nelson, Kaz Garas, and John Kerr.
24	24	"Shattered Image"	Michael O'Herlihy	Story by : Roland Wolpert and Jack Guss; Teleplay by : Guerdon Trueblood	March 22, 1973
Mike Stone has reason to believe that the death of a politician is no accident. With Barbara Rush, Jim Davis, and Dick Sargent.
25	25	"The Unicorn"	Virgil W. Vogel	Story by : Jerry Ziegman; Teleplay by : Jerry Ziegman and Mort Fine	April 5, 1973
A priest won't tell Stone where a murderer is hiding. Meantime, drug smugglers look for a stolen shipment of heroin. With Richard Egan and Charles Aidman.
26	26	"Legion of the Lost"	Robert Douglas	Calvin Clements Jr.	April 12, 1973
After three winos are brutally beaten to death, Stone goes undercover as a homeless man. With Leslie Nielsen and Dean Stockwell.

=== Season 2 (1973–74) ===
No. overall	No. in season	Title	Directed by	Written by	Original release date
27	1	"A Wrongful Death"	Don Medford	Edward DeBlasio	September 13, 1973
The father of a robbery suspect killed by Keller insists his boy was unarmed. With Ina Balin and Michael Constantine.
28	2	"Betrayed"	William Hale	Mark Weingart	September 20, 1973
One of the girlfriends of a young charmer learns that he has robbed a bank. With Martin Sheen.
29	3	"For the Love of God"	Virgil W. Vogel	Rick Husky	September 27, 1973
In order to stop a psychotic priest-killer, Lt. Stone goes undercover as a Roman Catholic priest. The victims were all clergymen who studied at the same seminary. With Leif Erickson.
30	4	"Before I Die"	William Hale	Albert Ruben	October 4, 1973
A cop who finds out that he has a terminal illness sets out to kill a racketeer who's been his quarry for the last year and a half. With Leslie Nielsen and Ray Danton.
31	5	"Going Home"	Robert Day	Jack B. Sowards	October 11, 1973
An operation run by the syndicate is burgled by a small-time crook. With Sheree North and Tom Bosley.
32	6	"The Stamp of Death"	Seymour Robbie	Robert I. Holt	October 18, 1973
A rich man is murdered over a stamp collection which turns out to be an insurance scam. With Jessica Walter and Earl Holliman.
33	7	"Harem"	Virgil W. Vogel	John D.F. Black	October 25, 1973
A flute-playing "Pied Piper" talks teenage girls into prostitution. He promises to take care of them; he's actually a ruthless killer who will stop at nothing to protect himself. With Ricky Nelson and Kay Lenz.
34	8	"No Badge for Benjy"	Seymour Robbie	George Bellak	November 1, 1973
Two very different victims are murdered: one a very rich foreign businessman found knifed; the other a poor black police informant found shot in a phone booth. Meanwhile, a Japanese industrialist is also found dead.
35	9	"The Twenty-Four Karat Plague"	Don Medford	Story by : Robert Sherman; Teleplay by : Robert Malcolm Young	November 8, 1973
Hijackers steal more than they bargained for, not knowing the gold they took is mixed with deadly uranium. With Vic Morrow and Anthony Zerbe.
36	10	"Shield of Honor"	Eric Till	D. C. Fontana	November 15, 1973
Stone and Keller investigate how a contract killer obtained inside information about a mob witness. With Mariette Hartley.
37	11	"The Victims"	George McCowan	Jerome Coopersmith	November 29, 1973
A trio of violent prison escapees leaves a trail of blood by murdering or crippling everyone they see. With Henry Silva.
38	12	"The Runaways"	Seymour Robbie	Robert Malcolm Young	December 6, 1973
Kidnapping and murder are laid at the feet of a boy stealing medicine for his ailing sister. With Jeanette Nolan, Barry Livingston and Larry Wilcox. (This episode is unrelated to the later QM Productions series of the same name.)
39	13	"Winterkill"	Seymour Robbie	Jack B. Sowards	December 13, 1973
Angered by the rising cost of health care, an old man tries to pay his friend's bills by threatening a businessman with the bombing of his buildings. With Denver Pyle and Paul Fix.
40	14	"Most Feared in the Jungle"	Robert Day	Jerome Coopersmith	December 20, 1973
Believing her baby was kidnapped, not stillborn as people claim, a mother embarks on a murderous quest to find the truth.
41	15	"Commitment"	Richard Donner	John D.F. Black	January 3, 1974
An undercover cop is murdered with Stone's gun, and a hotshot young inspector seems determined to pin the rap on Stone. With Tyne Daly.
42	16	"Chapel of the Damned"	George McCowan	Robert Schlitt	January 17, 1974
A wealthy woman, whose daughter is kidnapped and held for ransom, has more faith in a female psychic than in Stone and Keller. With Diana Douglas.
43	17	"Blockade"	Virgil W. Vogel	Story by : Jack Morton; Teleplay by : James Menzies	January 24, 1974
A woman who has dedicated her life to a prominent family fails to see her neglected son has fallen in with a psycho—and may have helped him kill a woman. With Ida Lupino. (KBAY, which was pictured as an all-news radio station in this episode and played an integral part in its plot, was an actual Bay Area radio station, but it carried an easy listening format at the time this episode was produced and broadcast.)
44	18	"Crossfire"	William Hale	Jerry McNeely	January 31, 1974
A philandering professor is killed and his mistress shot by a sniper who has been terrorizing a college campus. With Nick Nolte and Celeste Holm.
45	19	"A String of Puppets"	Richard Donner	Story by : James Schmerer; Teleplay by : Mark Weingart	February 7, 1974
Keller goes undercover as an ex-con musician to bust a crooked parole officer and his ring of parolees. With Claude Akins and Lola Falana.
46	20	"Inferno"	Virgil W. Vogel	James M. Miller	February 14, 1974
Stone looks for the arsonists who set a fire that killed two firemen. With Glenn Corbett.
47	21	"The Hard Breed"	Virgil W. Vogel	Story by : Ron Bishop; Teleplay by : Jim Byrnes	February 21, 1974
Two Gunsmoke writers teamed on this modern-day Western set at a rodeo in San Francisco's Cow Palace, where a cowboy was trampled to death by a bull; his mates suspected it to be murder. With Sam Elliott, Noah Beery Jr., Lane Bradbury and Jim Davis. Keith Jackson appears as himself, covering the rodeo for ABC's Wide World of Sports.
48	22	"Rampage"	John Wilder	Albert Ruben	February 28, 1974
A team of angry fathers, who are fed up with crime in their neighborhood, take a vigilante approach at solving the problem. During one of their rampages, a police informant is killed. With Robert Hooks and Joe Santos.
49	23	"Death and the Favored Few"	Virgil W. Vogel	Gene L. Coon	March 14, 1974
San Francisco's social elite are suspects when a publisher who blackmailed them is found murdered. With Rosemary Murphy. (Writer Gene L. Coon died July 8, 1973, several months before this episode aired.)

=== Season 3 (1974–75) ===
No. overall	No. in season	Title	Directed by	Written by	Original release date
50	1	"One Last Shot"	William Hale	Jack B. Sowards	September 12, 1974
Alcoholic officer Joe Landers accidentally gets his partner killed and clumsily tries to cover it up as Stone and Keller work their way to the truth. With Leslie Nielsen and Susan Strasberg.
51	2	"The Most Deadly Species"	Virgil W. Vogel	Hesper Anderson	September 19, 1974
When a high-ranking hoodlum's son is found murdered he brings in the help of Sydney, a hit woman who's assigned to murder the three thugs responsible. As part of her mission, she seduces Keller for information. With Brenda Vaccaro.
52	3	"Target: Red"	Barry Crane	Rick Husky	September 26, 1974
A meticulous and ruthless assassin and former government agent is hired by a right-wing cabal to murder a visiting Chinese diplomat. With Bill Bixby and Andrew Duggan.
53	4	"Mask of Death"	Harry Falk	Robert Malcolm Young	October 3, 1974
A professional female impersonator (John Davidson) whose intense identification with one of the women he mimics -- a fictitious 1930s movie star -- creates an uncontrollable split personality and eventually leads to murder. With Marianne McAndrew, Herb Edelman, John Fiedler and Bernie Kopell.
54	5	"I Ain't Marchin' Anymore"	Paul Stanley	Albert Ruben	October 10, 1974
Keller infiltrates a group of Vietnam War protesters, hoping to find who murdered an AWOL marine who had returned to the United States after living in exile in Canada. With Don Stroud and Michael Burns. (Note: A voiceover at the start of Act I mentioned that the events in this episode took place before President Gerald Ford's clemency of draft dodgers who had left the United States, which was announced September 16, 1974.)
55	6	"One Chance to Live"	Seymour Robbie	David Friedkin	October 17, 1974
A woman conceals an affair with a married diplomat, whose wife threatens to kill her. With Pippa Scott and Edward Mulhare.
56	7	"Jacob's Boy"	Harry Falk	Paul Savage	October 24, 1974
An innocent man isn't worried about a new murder charge against him, but he is afraid that once the police process his fingerprints, they will learn that he is a fugitive from a 25-year-old homicide investigation. With Brock Peters and Dabney Coleman.
57	8	"Flags of Terror"	Virgil W. Vogel	Jerry Ziegman	October 31, 1974
Domestic terrorists take several people hostage, including Keller. Stone has to deal with not only the terrorists but a right-wing journalist and a vengeful father whose daughter was killed. With Carl Franklin.
58	9	"Cry Help!"	Corey Allen	Story by : Leonardo Bercovici; Teleplay by : Larry Brody and Leonardo Bercovici	November 7, 1974
A troubled teen from a broken home is suspected of shooting a friend's stepfather. With Mariette Hartley and Clint Howard.
59	10	"For Good or Evil"	Michael Caffey	Mort Fine	November 14, 1974
A crime boss who murdered a rival recruits into his organization a witness to his crime. With Mike Evans, Berlinda Tolbert, Herbert Jefferson Jr., Hari Rhodes, Don Pedro Colley and Randolph Powell. Note: Evans and Tolbert would later play Lionel and Jenny Jefferson on The Jeffersons.
60	11	"Bird of Prey"	Virgil W. Vogel	Guerdon Trueblood	November 21, 1974
Keller goes undercover as a USAF officer to investigate a woman's murder that might involve an Air Force colonel. With Dennis Cole.
61	12	"License to Kill"	Virgil W. Vogel	Story by : Robert Keith; Teleplay by : Don Balluck	December 5, 1974
Mike's former partner returns to San Francisco, but not because of any longing for the good old days. He's back in town to kill the hired gunman who murdered his son years before. With Murray Hamilton.
62	13	"The Twenty-Five Caliber Plague"	Virgil W. Vogel	Tony Kayden and Michael Russnow	December 12, 1974
A single .25 caliber pistol affects many lives in a single weekend, as it was involved in three, otherwise-unrelated crimes. With Robert Webber.
63	14	"Mister Nobody"	Corey Allen	Robert Sherman	December 19, 1974
A retired cobbler takes the rap for a shooting to protect the real killer, the grandson of his best friend. With Sam Jaffe.
64	15	"False Witness"	Paul Stanley	Mort Fine	January 9, 1975
Officer Jimmy Vega's personal vendetta against a local drug dealer threatens to ruin both his and Keller's careers.
65	16	"Letters from the Grave"	Virgil W. Vogel	Tom Cannan	January 16, 1975
A skeleton discovered on Alcatraz is that of a convict who'd supposedly escaped in the 1950s. With William Windom.
66	17	"Endgame"	Jerry Jameson	Albert Ruben	January 23, 1975
After Steve is injured in a fray with a gangster, Mike is demoted to walking a beat for insubordinately insisting on taking revenge, after receiving news that Steve sustained brain damage. But things are not as they seem when there was suspicion that someone within the police department was working with the gangster, with Mike's daughter Jeannie knowing the real extent of Steve's injuries.
67	18	"Ten Dollar Murder"	William Hale	D.C. Fontana	January 30, 1975
A policewoman's son holds up taxicabs for a hobby that eventually results in the murder of an undercover cop.
68	19	"The Programming of Charlie Blake"	Nicholas Colasanto	Rick Blaine	February 6, 1975
A supposedly reformed sex offender is being brainwashed by his psychiatrist into believing he has committed murder. With Dean Stockwell and Dee Wallace.
69	20	"River of Fear"	Michael Caffey	Robert Malcolm Young	February 13, 1975
A 12-year-old girl knows her stepfather murdered her mother, but her attempts to unmask him only impede the police's investigation. With Kim Richards.
70	21	"Asylum"	Robert Douglas	Larry Brody	February 20, 1975
Keller goes undercover at a mental hospital to uncover the truth about a string of mysterious deaths. With Robert Walker Jr.
71	22	"Labyrinth"	William Hale	Del Reisman	February 27, 1975
Stone and Keller investigate the death of a mob hitman tossed out of a window by his intended victim, a boxer who didn't throw a fight. With Julie Adams and Don Gordon.
72	23	"Solitaire"	Seymour Robbie	D.C. Fontana	March 13, 1975
Stone is teamed with independent-minded narc Al Walczinsky while Keller recovers from a gunshot wound. Together they try to break up a narcotics ring — and Stone suspects Walczinsky's in on the racket. With Tony Lo Bianco and Sabrina Scharf.

=== Season 4 (1975–76) ===
No. overall	No. in season	Title	Directed by	Written by	Original release date
73	1	"Poisoned Snow"	William Hale	Paul Savage	September 11, 1975
A narcotics cop laces a batch of cocaine with cyanide and puts it on the street. With Clu Gulager and Mark Hamill.
74	2	"The Glass Dart Board"	Harry Falk	Sean Baine	September 18, 1975
A psychopathic killer uses people living in San Francisco's high-rises for target practice. With Patrick O'Neal.
75	3	"No Place to Hide"	Virgil W. Vogel	Robert Malcolm Young	September 25, 1975
Prison gangs intimidate weaker prisoners into having their wives smuggle drugs. With Stefanie Powers. During the epilogue, Stone and Keller stood across the street from the studios of KBHK-TV 44, an actual San Francisco independent station.
76	4	"Men Will Die"	William Hale	Shirl Hendryx	October 2, 1975
An organization of angry rape victims helps a friend of Stone's daughter pursue the man who raped her. With Vera Miles.
77	5	"School of Fear"	William Hale	Story by : Gordon Basichis and Marcia Hammond Basichis; Teleplay by : Brad Radnitz	October 9, 1975
Upon learning that a teacher was killed during a student scuffle at a school where he once taught, a retired history teacher takes it upon himself to hold students hostage. With Maurice Evans and Geoffrey Lewis.
78	6	"Deadly Silence"	Virgil W. Vogel	John W. Bloch	October 16, 1975
Stone is hit by a van, and has to undergo surgery to have his hearing restored. With Meredith Baxter and Gerald McRaney.
79	7	"Murder by Proxy"	Virgil W. Vogel	Eugene Price	October 23, 1975
Property owners who refuse to sell their parcels find themselves murder victims at the hands of a developer. With Bradford Dillman and John Ritter.
80	8	"Trail of Terror"	Michael Preece	Jim Byrnes	October 30, 1975
Keller is pursued by killers as he transports a prisoner to jail. With James Woods.
81	9	"Web of Lies"	Virgil W. Vogel	Leonard Kantor	November 6, 1975
Keller and Stone must rely on a compulsive liar while investigating a jewel robbery. With Pat Hingle.
82	10	"Dead Air"	Virgil W. Vogel	Marvin Kupfer	November 13, 1975
A radio host is accused of murder when a woman who claimed to be carrying his baby dies. With Larry Hagman and Arlene Golonka.
83	11	"Merchants of Death"	Virgil W. Vogel	Joseph Polizzi	November 20, 1975
Two rival gangs start a turf war with a youth worker caught in the middle. With Greg Morris.
84	12	"The Cat's Paw"	Virgil W. Vogel	D.C. Fontana	December 4, 1975
Stone conducts a murder/robbery investigation with Inspector Irene Martin. With Diane Baker.
85	13	"Spooks for Sale"	Michael Douglas	Albert Ruben	December 11, 1975
The death of a night watchman during a burglary puts Stone and Keller into the midst of a spy-vs.-spy conflict between high-tech industrial espionage firms. With Fritz Weaver and Tom Selleck. (This is Michael Douglas's only directorial effort to date.)
86	14	"Most Likely to Succeed"	William Hale	John D. Hess	December 18, 1975
Stone and Keller investigate a murder at an all-boys prep school. With Charles Aidman and Kristoffer Tabori.
87	15	"Police Buff"	Virgil W. Vogel	Story by : Walter Bloch; Teleplay by : Guerdon Trueblood	January 8, 1976
A man who likes to follow the police scanner wants to be a cop. He takes the law into his own hands when a suspected cop-killer is set free. With Bill Bixby.
88	16	"The Honorable Profession"	Harry Falk	Paul Robert Coyle	January 15, 1976
Stone and Keller look to find out why a passer-by who tried to help a mortally wounded officer gave a false name for himself. With Robert Reed.
89	17	"Requiem for Murder"	Harry Falk	James Johnson Sweeney	January 22, 1976
A bishop is shot after receiving a crank letter, and he tries to protect the person who shot him. With Richard Basehart.
90	18	"Underground"	Paul Stanley	Story by : Philip Saltzman; Teleplay by : Sean Baine	January 29, 1976
A cop seeks to catch his brother's murderer by going undercover in an illegal gambling operation. With Claudia Jennings.
91	19	"Judgement Day"	Virgil W. Vogel	Ron Buck	February 19, 1976
The son of a disbarred lawyer targets "bleeding heart liberal" judges who ruined his father's career. With Jean Hagen.
92	20	"Clown of Death"	Virgil W. Vogel	Arthur Rowe	February 26, 1976
Two retired brothers, riggers for circuses many years before, are found murdered while a circus happens to be performing in San Francisco at the Cow Palace. With David Birney.
93	21	"Superstar"	Virgil W. Vogel	Mort. Fine	March 4, 1976
Stone clashes with an abrasive NYC cop who is on the trail of his partner's killer. This was the pilot for the short-lived spinoff series Bert D'Angelo/Superstar -- which actually ended up premiering two weeks before this episode aired! With Paul Sorvino.
94	22	"Alien Country"	Virgil W. Vogel	Larry Brody	March 11, 1976
An illegal immigrant gets a job in San Francisco, but moments later there is a raid by the Immigration Service and an officer is killed.
95	23	"Runaway"	Harry Falk	Paul Savage	March 18, 1976
Stone searches for a fugitive and is dogged by a runaway girl who is the fugitive's daughter.

=== Season 5 (1976–77) ===
No. overall	No. in season	Title	Directed by	Written by	Original release date
96	1	"The Thrill Killers: Part 1"	Virgil W. Vogel	Cliff Gould	September 30, 1976
Misguided radicals take a jury hostage in a case where corrupt "movement leaders" are being tried for murder. With Patty Duke.
97	2	"The Thrill Killers: Part 2"	Virgil W. Vogel	Cliff Gould	October 7, 1976
Mike and Inspector Dan Robbins make a last-ditch effort to save the jury from execution at the hands of the radicals. Steve leaves the police force. With Richard Hatch, Doris Roberts and Susan Dey. Note: The show's only two-part story was originally planned to be shown as a two-hour episode - which is why Part 2 features Acts V to VIII rather than I to IV - but Fred Silverman mandated the episode be split in half, so that Part 2 could go head to head with the fifth season premiere of rival Quinn Martin show Barnaby Jones on CBS (Keller's departure lost out to J.R. Jones's arrival in the ratings).
98	3	"Dead or Alive"	Michael Caffey	Burton Armus	October 21, 1976
A man offers a $1,000,000 reward for the capture -- dead or alive -- of the man who raped and murdered his daughter on a public tennis court, throwing the city into greed-fueled chaos. With Howard Duff and Max Gail. Note: Starting with this episode, weekly stories would be broken into Acts I-V with Epilog. (Up to this point, episodes were broken into Acts I-IV with Epilog.)
99	4	"The Drop"	Harry Falk	Norman Lessing (teleplay and story) and Robert Malcolm Young (story)	October 28, 1976
Mike thinks he's a murder target when a kidnapper specifies that he deliver the ransom money. With Dabney Coleman.
100	5	"No Minor Vices"	William Wiard	Arthur Bernard Lewis	November 4, 1976
The father of a 16-year-old girl murders her "johns" one by one, unbeknownst to her. With Maureen McCormick.
101	6	"In Case of Madness"	Barry Shear	John W. Bloch	November 11, 1976
A songwriter-singer is a suspect in the murder of his producer. With Desi Arnaz, Jr.
102	7	"Till Death Do Us Part"	William Wiard	John D.F. Black	November 18, 1976
Stone must protect a former bookkeeper's wife in order to have her testify against several high profile mobsters who want her dead because of the evidence she has against them. With Jessica Walter.
103	8	"Child of Anger"	David Whorf	Charles Larson	December 2, 1976
A clothing designer finds herself on the front page after her daughter confesses to the murder of her latest fling. Stone and Robbins realize the girl's really a witness and not a murderer. With Dorothy Malone.
104	9	"Hot Dog"	Virgil W. Vogel	Guerdon Trueblood	December 9, 1976
Stone and Robbins go after a gang of thieves who use motorcycles to make their getaway. With Don Johnson.
105	10	"Castle of Fear"	Allen Reisner	James Menzies	December 23, 1976
Paranoia leads to someone shooting a cop skulking on their property. With Pat Hingle.
106	11	"One Last Trick"	Kenneth Gilbert	Story by : Chris Kazan; Teleplay by : Chris Kazan, Gloria Goldsmith and Jack B. Sowards	January 6, 1977
A former prostitute goes back to work to smoke out the murderer of another prostitute. With Lee Purcell and Sherry Jackson.
107	12	"Monkey Is Back"	Richard Lang	Sean Baine	January 13, 1977
An ex-con is out for vengeance against the high school gang whose initiation ritual led to his 20-year sentence. With Gary Lockwood.
108	13	"The Cannibals"	Walter Grauman	Glen Olson and Rod Baker	January 20, 1977
A mobster's son steals loot from his father and seeks protection from federal authorities in exchange for being a material witness against his father. With Andrew Robinson and Len Birman.
109	14	"Who Killed Helen French?"	Allen Reisner	Robert W. Lenski	February 3, 1977
An abused wife vanishes after a vicious attack by her drunken husband and all clues point to murder with the husband as the prime suspect, but he can't remember if he did it or not. With Marlyn Mason.
110	15	"A Good Cop... But"	Harry Falk	Charles Larson	February 10, 1977
A cop-killer's henchmen hunt the only witnesses to his crime, an officer and an informer. With Barry Primus.
111	16	"Hang Tough"	William Hale	Norman Lessing	February 17, 1977
A narcotics cop who has only four months to go 'til retirement roughs up a drug pusher and plants a knife on him. Meanwhile, an operation begins to uncover the "Tucson connection," a major drug ring operating in San Francisco. With Ned Beatty.
112	17	"Innocent No More"	Kenneth Gilbert	William Robert Yates	February 24, 1977
Mike pushes to get teen gang members, who have made a mockery of the juvenile court, tried as adults. With Christopher Atkins and Mark Hamill.
113	18	"Once a Con"	Richard Lang	Story by : Robert Dellinger; Teleplay by : Robert Dellinger and Michael Seims	March 3, 1977
The main suspect in the murder of a student is a prison inmate enrolled in a special program. With John Rubinstein.
114	19	"Interlude"	Harry Falk	Larry Alexander	April 28, 1977
Refusing to believe he murdered his wife, a man escapes from an institution for the criminally insane to find her. With Lois Nettleton.
115	20	"Dead Lift"	Michael Preece	Larry Brody	May 5, 1977
A bodybuilder's short temper causes murder. With Arnold Schwarzenegger.
116	21	"Breakup"	Harry Falk	Anthony Lawrence	May 12, 1977
A small business owner is going through divorce proceedings while his business is in financial straits. His wife's lawyer just happens to also be hunted by a revenge-seeking ex-con. With Pernell Roberts.
117	22	"Let's Pretend We're Strangers"	Walter Grauman	Carol Saraceno	May 19, 1977
Robbins falls for a public defender representing a psycho, who is trying to eliminate witnesses to a murder. With Linda Kelsey.
118	23	"Time Out"	Kenneth Gilbert	Robert Heverly	June 2, 1977
A San Quentin prison guard must hunt down the criminals who escaped while under his guard. With Cliff Gorman.
119	24	"The Canine Collar"	Harry Falk	Robert Malcolm Young	June 9, 1977
Mike and Dan pursue a smuggler who will stop at nothing to locate a dog collar containing stolen diamonds. With George Dzundza.

== Television film (1992) ==
According to the weekly Nielsen ratings for the period of January 27 – February 2, 1992, the TV movie received a 13.2 rating and 20 share; 18.9 million viewers watched, ranking #23 out of 84 network programs aired.

Title	Directed by	Written by	Original release date
Back to the Streets of San Francisco	Mel Damski	William Yates	January 27, 1992
Captain Mike Stone is trying to find out who killed his long-time partner Steve Keller. Also, Stone must decide which of two inspectors to recommend for the position of Lieutenant: a woman (Debrah Farentino) with "Dirty Harry" tendencies, or a man (Conor O'Farrell) who reminds him of Keller.

== Home releases ==
The following DVD sets have been released by Paramount Home Video.

DVD set	Episodes	Release date
The Streets of San Francisco: Season 1, Volume 1	14	April 10, 2007
The Streets of San Francisco: Season 1, Volume 2	13	September 25, 2007
The Streets of San Francisco: Season 2, Volume 1	11	July 1, 2008
The Streets of San Francisco: Season 2, Volume 2	12	November 11, 2008
The Streets of San Francisco: Season 3, Volume 1	12	July 3, 2012
The Streets of San Francisco: Season 3, Volume 2	11	July 3, 2012
The Streets of San Francisco: Season 4, Volume 1	12	August 28, 2012
The Streets of San Francisco: Season 4, Volume 2	11	August 28, 2012
The Streets of San Francisco: The Complete Fourth Season	23	August 28, 2012
The Streets of San Francisco: Season 5, Volume 1	12	October 30, 2012
The Streets of San Francisco: Season 5, Volume 2	12	October 30, 2012
The Streets of San Francisco: The Complete Fifth Season	24	October 30, 2012

All five seasons are now available as a box set on DVD in region 1.

== Sources ==
- The Streets of San Francisco at IMDb
