= Capitol (TV series) =

American TV soap opera (1982–1987)

- Final main title card
- Genre: Soap opera
- Created by: Stephen Karpf; Elinor Karpf
- Written by: James Lipton; Peggy Sloane
- Starring: Constance Towers; Carolyn Jones; Marj Dusay; Rory Calhoun; Debrah Farentino; Kimberly Beck-Hilton; Catherine Hickland; Tawny Kitaen; Ginger Alden; Richard Egan; Julie Adams; Tonja Walker; Teri Hatcher; Tammy Wynette; Nicholas Walker; Bradley Lockerman; David Mason Daniels; Dane Witherspoon
- Composers: Bob Israel; Michel Rubini; Denny Jaeger
- Country of origin: United States
- Original language: English
- No. of seasons: 5
- No. of episodes: 1,293 (+ Pilot)

Production
- Executive producer: John Conboy
- Producer: Stockton Briggle
- Production locations: CBS Television City; Hollywood, California
- Running time: 30 minutes
- Production company: John Conboy Productions

Original release
- Network: CBS
- Release: March 29, 1982 – March 20, 1987

Capitol is an American soap opera which aired on CBS from March 29, 1982, to March 20, 1987, for 1,270 episodes. As its name suggests, the storyline usually revolved around the political intrigues of people whose lives are intertwined in Washington, D.C.

Prior to its March 29 daytime debut on the CBS schedule, a one-hour pilot episode aired on Friday night (March 26) immediately following an episode of Dallas.

== Synopsis ==
Capitol revolves around the Denning, Clegg, and McCandless families, who live in the fictional Jeffersonia, a suburb of Washington, D.C. At the center of the drama are feuding matriarchs Clarissa Tyler McCandless (Constance Towers) and Myrna Clegg (Carolyn Jones; Marla Adams; Marj Dusay). Kindly and down-to-earth Clarissa and vituperative and vindictive Myrna are former best friends who in their youth had been rivals over the love of Baxter McCandless; in retaliation for Baxter falling for Clarissa and not her, scheming Myrna had spread lies about Clarissa's father, liberal Congressman Judson (Rory Calhoun), linking him to communists during the McCarthy era.

Baxter has left Clarissa a widow, and Myrna is married to wealthy industrialist Sam Clegg (Robert Sampson; Richard Egan). The longstanding feud between the women is inflamed when Clarissa's war-hero son Tyler McCandless (David Mason Daniels; Dane Witherspoon) falls in love with Myrna's daughter, Julie Clegg (Kimberly Beck; Catherine Hickland). Despite Myrna's best efforts to destroy this match, they eventually marry. Also featured are Myrna's other children: Trey (Nicholas Walker), who is being groomed for the presidency; Brenda (Leslie Graves; Shannon Terhune; Ashley Laurence; Karen Kelly), and Jordy (Todd Curtis, Russell Todd). Despite their mother's scheming and conniving, Julie, Jordy and Brenda were not like Myrna whatsoever. Trey, a young congressman, however was ambitious and could be ruthless. He disliked Tyler and considered him to be a rival. Besides Tyler and her father, Judson, Clarissa's family includes sons Wally (Bill Beyers), a young man with a gambling problem, Thomas (Brian Robert Taylor; Michael Catlin), a doctor, and Matt (Shea Farrell; Christopher Durham), a handsome athlete. Also living with them for a time was Clarissa's niece, Gillian (Kelly Palzis). Meanwhile, Clarissa is in love with Senator Mark Denning (Ed Nelson) who is in an unhappy marriage with agoraphobic Paula (Julie Adams) and is the father of reporter Sloane Denning (Debrah Farentino). Clarissa later falls for Jarrett Morgan (Ron Harper), who turns out to be her presumed-dead husband Baxter.

While the original focus was on the Romeo and Juliet style love story of Tyler and Julie, the bulk of the storyline quickly switched to Trey and Sloane whose 1984 wedding was filmed on location at the Jefferson Memorial. Trey's previous relationship with former prostitute Kelly Harper (Jane Daly; Jess Walton) produced a son, Scotty, and eventually caused Trey and Sloane to divorce. Julie and Tyler dealt with constant interference by Myrna as well as Julie's inability to have a child. Playboy Jordy had several serious romances, most notably with feisty Lizabeth Bachman (Tonja Walker) and sweet Leanne Foster (Christine Kellogg). Capitol was also notable for having a major disabled character, Dr. Thomas McCandless, a successful surgeon in spite of having to walk with the help of crutches. Thomas was paired originally with the flirtatious Lizabeth who loved him in spite of also being attracted to Jordy. Later on, after Trey and Kelly broke up, Thomas became involved with Kelly, which involved him in another triangle with a member of the Clegg family. The Cleggs and McCandlesses became further tied together, to Myrna's chagrin, through the romance of Wally and Brenda.

The older characters were busy in storylines as well, most notably Clarissa and Mark who had to deal with the psychotic Paula, who pretended to be agoraphobic as she plotted to murder Clarissa, while Myrna had to struggle with the news that Matt McCandless's girlfriend, Amy Burke, was Sam's illegitimate daughter. Lana Wood, Natalie Wood's younger sister, was cast in the part, but the storyline was dropped after a little more than six months. The older character's pasts were explored more deeply when the wheelchair-using Jared Morgan was revealed to be Clarissa's supposedly deceased husband, Baxter. The performances of the older actors were honored with several Soap Opera Digest Nominations, but none of the cast were ever Emmy Nominated. Primetime TV veteran Marj Dusay took over the role of Myrna in April 1983 when Carolyn Jones became too ill to continue and her temporary substitute, Marla Adams, joined The Young and the Restless. Dusay was credited for helping to flesh out the character of the scheming Myrna to make her more multi-dimensional and would remain on the show through the remainder of the run.

The casting of Jess Walton as Kelly Harper was also critically praised as the extremely complex Sloane returned to her old scheming nature in order to keep her marriage to Trey on solid ground. Veteran character actor Arthur Malet was cast as Kelly's older friend who had taken her in while she was pregnant with Scotty, and later on, Lola Falana was cast as an artist's representative who took an interest in Kelly's painting and aided her in pursuing a career as an artist. This storyline also cast Dark Shadows veteran Lara Parker as a distinguished gallery owner, but unfortunately, Falana's storyline was never developed beyond the hint of a mysterious past. With Washington, D.C. having a large black population, soap critics complained that Capitol writers were not taking advantage of this fact to tell important stories, and Falana lasted less than a year.

In 1983, Zed Diamond, portrayed by Bradley Lockerman, arrived in Washington. Diamond was a wealthy man of mystery. He was handsome and articulate, but little was known about his past except rumors. He owned the successful restaurant Mario's, which the rich and powerful frequented. He also owned a local television station. He was polite and gracious to the patrons of his restaurant. But he could be dark and a deadly man of action when sufficiently provoked. He disliked Trey Clegg, whom he considered to be a gutless backstabber. He had no love for Myrna and Sam Clegg, who had mistreated his late mother. Zed's mother had been a maid at the Clegg mansion many years prior. The Clegg's had fired his mother, whom they wrongfully accused of stealing from them. This destroyed his mother's reputation making it impossible for her to find work. He was kind to Julie Clegg McCandless, whom he liked. He would have an affair with Sloane Denning Clegg. Sloane slept with Diamond for revenge when she discovered the long-term relationship between Trey and Kelly, which Trey had never mentioned before their marriage. Zed was also involved in storylines concerning his mysterious past, which involved his relationship with the head of a powerful crime family and that man's daughter, Jenny.

The re-casting of Julie Clegg McCandless with Catherine Hickland was a plus, especially when the mysterious Zed Diamond appeared on the scene, shocked by her resemblance to his late wife, Jenny. Eventually, the character of Jenny was revealed to be alive, also played by Hickland, and gave her the opportunity to show off her chops playing a dangerous character, Jenny being revealed to have major psychological problems. When Jenny and Zed's storyline took off, Julie faded into the background, having gone off to find husband Tyler who was revealed to be involved in an off-screen affair. After Jenny's demise, Hickland remained off-screen for several months, only returning as Julie, who had left Tyler, for the last few months of the show with basically no storyline of her own. Although a relationship between Julie and Zed Diamond was just beginning when the show was cancelled. Hickland would go on to several other soaps playing a variety of schemers as would Jess Walton, Constance Towers, and Marj Dusay. At one point, Hickland, Towers, and Dusay were dominating all of the ABC soaps as villainesses of very nefarious natures while Walton found great success on The Young and the Restless by taking over the role of Jill Foster.

As with other soap operas in the mid-1980s, Capitol tried its hand with adventure storylines, pairing Sloane with Prince Ali (Peter Lochran), the potential King of Baraq, a fictional Islamic nation undergoing political strife. Much of the action took place outside the United States, and while it paralleled much of what was going on in the real world, audiences began to drift away. Soap Opera Digest praised the Sloane and Ali pairing, naming their romantic moments as the best love scenes of 1986. In spite of that praise, the show was criticized for taking its storyline twists to bizarre extremes. Within short periods of time, Sam Clegg was revealed to have fathered Scotty, not Trey, and Mark Denning was revealed to be a traitor. This infuriated veteran actor Ed Nelson so much that he quit in disgust. Rory Calhoun had also departed the show, although he did sign a new contract shortly before the cancellation announcement, reappearing around the same time as Catherine Hickland.

The last weeks of the show focused on Sloane's taking over as Queen of Baracq (Ali was presumed dead) and her efforts to hide from his enemies. Several new characters were introduced, the most memorable being Laureen Clegg (Janis Paige), Sam's first wife and Trey's real mother, who kept her identity secret and became Scotty's nanny. Sam, having become involved in an affair with the much younger Kate Wells (Cheryl Ann Wilson), found himself the victim of blackmail after breaking off with Kate as she had discovered the truth about Scotty's paternity. This led the show to present two cliff-hangers: Myrna's vowing of war after Sam, at Kate's demand, requested a divorce, and Sloane's standing in front of a firing squad.

== Production ==
CBS asked The Young and the Restless producer John Conboy to produce an equivalent in daytime during the summer of 1981 to compete with the more youth-oriented ABC soap operas such as All My Children and General Hospital. Capitol became the first soap opera to be produced in Los Angeles since The Young and the Restless had begun in 1973. Prior to its March 29 daytime debut on the CBS schedule, a one-hour pilot episode aired on Friday night (March 26) immediately following an episode of Dallas. Capitol premiered on March 29, 1982 on CBS, replacing Search for Tomorrow in the 2:30 pm (ET)/1:30 (CT/MT/PT) timeslot. After that show's producers, Procter & Gamble was rebuffed by CBS to move their show back to its former timeslot, 12:30 pm/11:30 am and with its contract with the network expiring, Search for Tomorrow moved to NBC the same day Capitol launched, and continued there until it was canceled near the end of 1986.

The show's title sequence during its early years showed aerial scenes of Washington, D.C. shot during the winter of 1980–81. In the final year, a computerized sequence was instituted, illustrating glamour and sex in addition to the Washington Monument and the Jefferson Memorial.

=== Cancellation ===
During most of its run, the show had steady ratings and held on in the middle of the pack among the soaps. The storylines that were resolved beginning in the 1985–86 season, however, caused a rather steep fall in ratings. Not only was Scotty Harper revealed to have been fathered by Sam Clegg, but Senator Mark Denning turned out to be a spy. Sloane was paired with an Arab prince, Prince Ali (Peter Lochran), which gave the opportunity for some exotic love scenes. With Clarissa not sure if the man she thought was Baxter was really her long presumed dead husband, the show veered further off track by revealing that Clarissa and Baxter's son, Matt, was really Prince Ali's long-lost brother, adopted by Baxter to prevent him from being killed. However, the addition of film and stage actress Janis Paige as Sam's long-gone first wife, Laureen, was filled with potential that never got the chance to be explored.

By early summer 1986, CBS had lost faith in Capitol and, needing a replacement, then-head of CBS Daytime, Michael Brockman requested proposals from industry writers and producers. Veteran producer Paul Rauch responded with an idea for a more satirical serial called Grosse Pointe about a wealthy and dysfunctional blue blood family from Grosse Pointe, while Ryan's Hope co-creator Claire Labine's proposed drama was titled Celebration that would revolve around a middle-class family in the suburbs of Cleveland that would be produced by Procter & Gamble. Her family-driven concept and traditional approach lacked the overt glamour of Capitol and fell more along the lines of As the World Turns or Another World, but would include a modern 80s twist to keep the show current. Ultimately, however, neither Rauch's nor Labine's concepts would make it to the air.

On December 18, 1986, it was announced that Capitol would be cancelled, with its final episode airing on March 20, 1987. Premiering in its place would be Bill and Lee Phillip Bell's new production, a sister show to their popular The Young and the Restless called The Bold and the Beautiful. Accommodating the successor soap opera's launch meant accelerating production on Capitol's remaining episodes, so the last two months' shows were taped in the span of a month. Conboy and head writer James Lipton brought the soap's saga to a loose ending with a cliffhanger series finale which left Sam being blackmailed by his lover Kate into asking Myrna for a divorce, and Sloane placed in front of a firing squad in the Middle Eastern kingdom of her lover, King Ali. The Bold and the Beautiful debuted three days after the finale, on March 23, 1987, and has been on the air ever since; it would prove more popular than its fellow half-hour predecessor, going on to place near the top of the soap ratings (much of the time behind only The Young and the Restless) for much of its existence to date.

The show should have been moved because we were in a very tough time slot. In New York it was 2:30 to 3 p.m., when mothers go to pick up their children at school. It was very tough and yet we were still making it. We were never out of tenth or eleventh place (out of approximately 25 daytime shows) in all the time we were on, which is rare for a new soap opera. I really felt like I lost a child because we gave five years of tremendous energy, caring, and love to the project. We all felt we finally had it in a position where the stories were wonderful. We were devastated that the network had the problem it had and that people who didn't know came on and made the decision [to cancel].

— Constance Towers, actress and Capitol cast member

== Cast ==
During its run, Capitol featured several well-known veteran actors of the stage and screen in contract roles, including Richard Egan, Carolyn Jones, Rory Calhoun, Constance Towers and Julie Adams. In the show's earlier years, singer Lola Falana played wealthy entertainment mogul Charity Blake, and Natalie Wood's sister Lana Wood played Fran Burke. In 1986, country music singer Tammy Wynette made appearances as hairstylist-turned-singer Darlene Stankowski. Stage veteran and Oscar nominee Beah Richards had a short term role around the same time. In the show's last month, Broadway and movie veteran Janis Paige played Sam's first wife, Laureen, who was Trey's mother.

- Carolyn Jones as Myrna Clegg #1 (1982–1983)
- Marla Adams as Myrna Clegg #2 (1983)
- Marj Dusay as Myrna Clegg #3 (1983–1987)
- Teri Hatcher as Angelica Stimac Clegg (1986–1987)
- Robert Sampson as Samuel Clegg II #1 (1982)
- Richard Egan as Samuel Clegg II #2 (1982–1987)
- Tonja Walker as Lizbeth Bachman (1982–1984)
- Kimberly Beck-Hilton as Julie Clegg #1 (1982–1983)
- Catherine Hickland as Julie Clegg McCandless #2 (1983–1987)
- Nicholas Walker as Trey Clegg
- Todd Curtis as Jordy Clegg
- Leslie Graves as Brenda Clegg #1 (1982–1984)
- Shannon Terhune as Brenda Clegg #2 (1984)
- Ashley Laurence as Brenda Clegg #3 (1984–1985)
- Karen Kelly as Brenda Clegg #4 (1985–1987)
- Constance Towers as Clarissa McCandless
- Bradley Lockerman as Zed Diamond (1983-1987)
- David Mason Daniels as Tyler McCandless #1 (1982–1985)
- Dane Witherspoon as Tyler McCandless #2 (1985–1986)
- Kelly Preston as Gillian McCandless (1982)
- Bill Beyers as Wallace "Wally" McCandless
- Brian Robert Taylor as Thomas McCandless #1 (1982–1983)
- Jane Daly as Shelly Granger (1982–1983)
- Rory Calhoun as Judge Judson Tyler
- Burke Byrnes as Dr. Franklin
- Ed Nelson as Senator Mark Denning
- Debrah Farentino as Sloane Denning (1982–1987)
- Michael Catlin as Thomas McCandless #2 (1983–1987)
- Shea Farrell as Matt McCandless #1 (1982)
- Christopher Durham as Matt McCandless #2 (1982–1984)
- Tawny Kitaen as Meredith Ross #1 (1986)
- Ginger Alden as Meredith Ross #2 (1986-1987)
- Tammy Wynette as Darlene Stankowski (1986–1987)
- Billy Warlock as Ricky Driscoll (1984–1985)
- Jess Walton as Kelly Harper (1984–1987)
- Julie Parrish as Maggie Brady
- Rodney Saulsberry as Jeff Johnson (1982–1983)

== Main crew ==
=== Executive producers ===
Duration	Name
March 29, 1982 – March 20, 1987	John Conboy

=== Head writers ===
Duration	Name
March 29 – September 17, 1982	Stephen and Elinor Karpf
September 20, 1982 – October 14, 1983	John William Corrington and Joyce Hooper Corrington
October 17, 1983 – October 19, 1984	Peggy O’Shea
October 22, 1984 – June 27, 1986	Henry Slesar
June 30, 1986 – March 20, 1987	James Lipton

- Peggy O'Shea
- Craig Carlson
- Granville Burgess
- Richard Camp
- Peggy Sloane
- John Sedlak
- Steve Hayes
- John William Corrington
- Joyce Corrington
- Shirley Hartman
- Susan Goldberg
- David Carren
- Carly Cady
- Stephen Karpf
- Elinor Karpf

== Scheduling/ratings ==
On June 8, 1981, CBS moved Search for Tomorrow, daytime television's longest-tenured soap and a fixture for nearly 30 years at 12:30 PM/11:30 AM Central, to the 2:30/1:30 PM timeslot between As the World Turns and Guiding Light in order to accommodate the hit serial The Young and the Restless. Procter & Gamble, who owned Search for Tomorrow, urged CBS to return the show to its former slot. The network refused, and when their contract with CBS expired, P&G sold Search for Tomorrow to NBC Daytime and the show premiered there on March 29, 1982. CBS replaced Search for Tomorrow with Capitol in its timeslot, scheduled against the last halves of NBC's Another World and ABC's One Life to Live, the latter of which dominated the ratings at the time.

Capitol debuted on CBS in 1982 in 8th place in the ratings, roughly the same as Search for Tomorrow had done. Capitol remained in the middle of the ratings pack throughout its five-year run ranking between 7th and 9th, with its best ratings points of 6.4 achieved in the 1983-1984 television season, in which it ranked 8th. In 1985, ratings fell slightly from a 5.8 to a 5.1, prompting some CBS affiliates to drop the show. CBS subsequently canceled the show and replaced it with The Bold and the Beautiful on March 23, 1987. However, CBS put The Bold and the Beautiful in the 1:30/12:30 timeslot, bumping As the World Turns to 2/1. The Bold and the Beautiful became both CBS' and America's second-highest rated soap opera, but its ratings never surpassed Capitol's ratings peak.
