= Seedpeople =

1992 film directed by Peter Manoogian

- Polish VHS artwork
- Directed by: Peter Manoogian
- Written by: Charles Band (original idea); Jackson Barr (screenplay)
- Produced by: Anne Kelly; Charles Band
- Starring: Sam Hennings; Andrea Roth
- Cinematography: Adolfo Bartoli
- Edited by: Tom Barrett; Bert Glatstein
- Music by: Bob Mithoff
- Distributed by: Full Moon Entertainment
- Release date: May 28, 1992
- Running time: 87 minutes
- Country: United States
- Language: English

Seedpeople is a 1992 comedy sci-fi horror film, executive produced by Charles Band (who originated the basic plot) and directed by Peter Manoogian. It stars Sam Hennings, Dane Witherspoon, Anne Betancourt and Andrea Roth.

== Plot ==
Seed pods from space land in the area surrounding a small rural town, and the seeds become alien creatures that contaminate the human population in the area, turning people into unwilling seed pods that in turn hatch into even more monsters.

== Cast ==
- Sam Hennings as Tom Baines
- Andrea Roth as Heidi Tucker
- Dane Witherspoon as Brad Yates
- Bernard Kates as "Doc" Roller
- Holly Fields as Kim Tucker
- John Mooney as Frank Tucker
- Anne Betancourt as Mrs. Santiago

== Release ==
Seedpeople was released direct-to-video on VHS in 1992. It received a DVD release in 2012, which was reissued in the UK in 2013 as part of 88 Films' Grindhouse Collection. A remastered Blu-ray was released in 2024.

== Canceled sequel ==
In the 1990s, writer/director Jay Woelfel wanted to work with Full Moon Pictures and thought that a sequel to one of their films might get their attention. Along with Dave Parker, Woelfel co-wrote a story called The Tree of Screams and pitched it to Full Moon as a possible sequel to Seedpeople. Executives at Full Moon reportedly loved the script but said, "Unfortunately, Seedpeople is probably the only film we’ve ever made that we will never make a sequel to."

== Other media ==
The Seedpeople appear in the fifth issue of Dollman Kills the Full Moon Universe, a crossover comic featuring Brick Bardo from Dollman tracking down different Full Moon monsters and villains to kill, published by Full Moon Comix in 2018.
