= The Streets of San Francisco =

American crime drama television series (1972–1977)

- Genre: Crime drama
- Based on: Poor, Poor Ophelia by Carolyn Weston
- Developed by: Edward Hume
- Starring: Karl Malden; Michael Douglas (Seasons 1–4); Richard Hatch (Season 5)
- Theme music composer: Patrick Williams
- Country of origin: United States
- Original language: English
- No. of seasons: 5
- No. of episodes: 121 (list of episodes)

Production
- Producer: Quinn Martin
- Running time: 50 minutes
- Production companies: QM Productions; Warner Bros. Television (1972–1974; season 1)

Original release
- Network: ABC
- Release: September 16, 1972 – June 9, 1977

The Streets of San Francisco is an American crime drama television series filmed on location in San Francisco and produced by Quinn Martin, with the first season produced in association with Warner Bros. Television (QM produced the show on its own for the remainder of its run).

It starred Karl Malden and Michael Douglas as two homicide inspectors in San Francisco. The show ran for five seasons on ABC between 1972 and 1977, amassing a total of 119 60-minute episodes. Douglas left the series at the start of its final season, and was replaced by Richard Hatch.

The series started with a pilot movie of the same title (based on the 1972 detective novel Poor, Poor Ophelia by Carolyn Weston) a week before the series debuted. Edward Hume, who wrote the teleplay for the pilot, was credited as having developed the series based on characters in Weston's novel. The pilot featured guest stars Robert Wagner, Tom Bosley, and Kim Darby.

== Plot ==
The show revolved around two police officers who investigated homicides in San Francisco. The center of the series was a veteran cop and widower, Lt. Michael Stone, star #897 (played by Malden), who had more than 20 years of police experience and was now assigned to the homicide detail of the San Francisco Police Department's Bureau of Inspectors. He was partnered with a young officer and energetic partner, Assistant Inspector Steve Keller, star #2248 (played by Douglas), a college graduate, aged 28, who had little experience on the police force. Stone became a second father to Keller as he learned the rigors and procedures of detective work. Eventually, Keller was promoted to full inspector. As the series progressed, Douglas became a star in his own right. Lt. Stone's daughter, Jeannie Stone (played by Darleen Carr), made occasional appearances.

== Production ==
The Streets of San Francisco premiered on ABC on Saturday, September 16, 1972, at 9 pm Eastern, competing against the popular CBS sitcoms The Mary Tyler Moore Show and The Bob Newhart Show. After Streets gained attention on Saturday nights during the first season, the show was moved to Thursday, where it stayed for the remainder of its run, beginning with the second season, competing against other successful 1970s crime dramas, in different timeslots.

By all accounts, Malden and Douglas developed a strong professional and personal relationship from their time on the series. Twenty years after last working together on an episode, they were both onstage at the 1996 People's Choice Awards. Malden referred to Douglas as "the son I never had" and mentioned that he had wanted producer Quinn Martin to cast Douglas on the series. Douglas responded to the compliment by calling Malden "my mentor", and both expressed that they enjoyed working together on the show.

After the second episode of the fifth and final season, Douglas left the show after successfully producing the film One Flew Over the Cuckoo's Nest, which won the Academy Award for Best Film for 1975. He, in turn, also established a film career. His character's absence was explained by having him take a teaching position at the University of California, located across the Bay in Berkeley, while Lt. Stone was partnered with another inspector, Inspector Dan Robbins (Richard Hatch).

Richard Hatch had started his career on the ABC soap All My Children and, after this show stopped production, went on to Battlestar Galactica. The change from Douglas to Hatch was not popular with audiences, and the show ended in 1977 due to declining ratings and increased production costs.

Additionally in 1977, writer James J. Sweeney won an Edgar Award from the Mystery Writers of America for his teleplay for the season-four episode "Requiem for Murder".

The series was sponsored by Ford Motor Company, and half of the vehicles shown were new Ford cars. In the early episodes, Keller and Stone drove a brown 1971 Ford Galaxie four-door sedan and the entire SFPD cruiser fleet consisted of Ford Galaxies.

On January 27, 1992, a reunion TV movie entitled Back to the Streets of San Francisco was aired, but Douglas did not appear in it. However, Darleen Carr did return as Mike Stone's daughter Jeannie.

== Cast ==
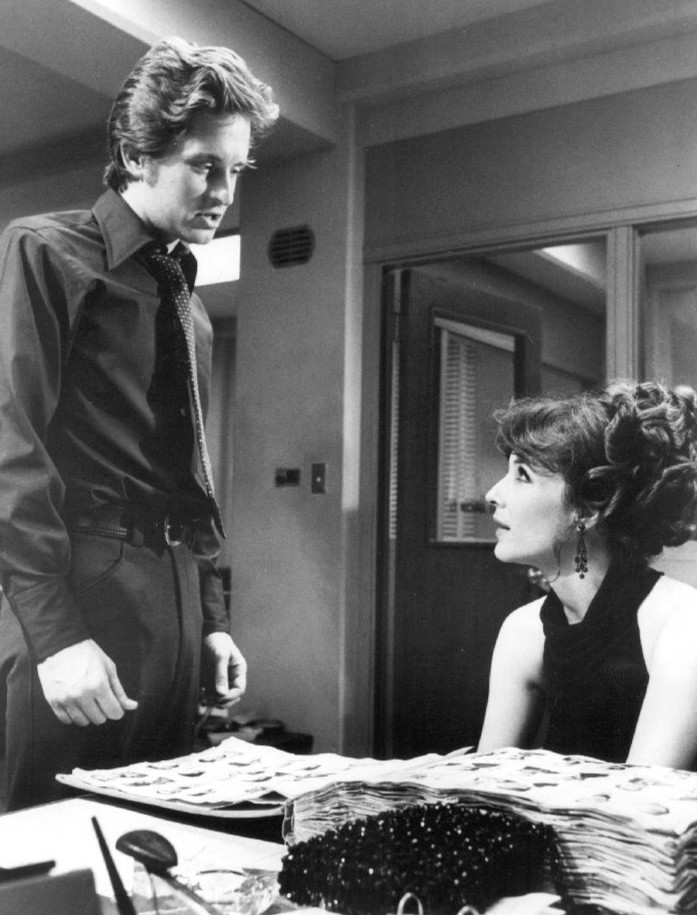
Douglas (left) as Steve Keller, with Janice Rule as Beverly Landau in "The First Day of Forever" (season one, episode two)

- Karl Malden as Lt. Mike Stone
- Michael Douglas as Inspector Steve Keller (Seasons 1–4)
- Richard Hatch as Inspector Dan Robbins (Season 5)
- Darleen Carr as Jeannie Stone
- Fred Sadoff as Dr. Lenny Murchison
- Lee Harris as Inspector Lee Lessing (Season 1)
- Vic Tayback as Inspector Norm Haseejian (Season 1)
- Norman Alden as Inspector. Dan Healy (Season 1)
- Ray K. Goman as Officer Vic Briles (Season 1)
- Tim O'Connor - Lt/Capt. Roy Devitt (Seasons 1–3)
- Robert F. Simon as Capt. Rudy Olson (Seasons 1–4)
- Hari Rhodes as Lab Technician Floyd Marsden (Seasons 1–4)
- Reuben Collins as Inspector Bill Tanner (Seasons 2–5)
- John Kerr as D.A. Gerald O’Brien (Seasons 2–5)
- Art Passarella as Sgt. Art Sekulovich (Seasons 3–5; the character name was an in-joke, as "Sekulovich" was Karl Malden's real last name)
- Ward Costello as Capt. Roy Devitt (Season 5)

=== Guest stars ===
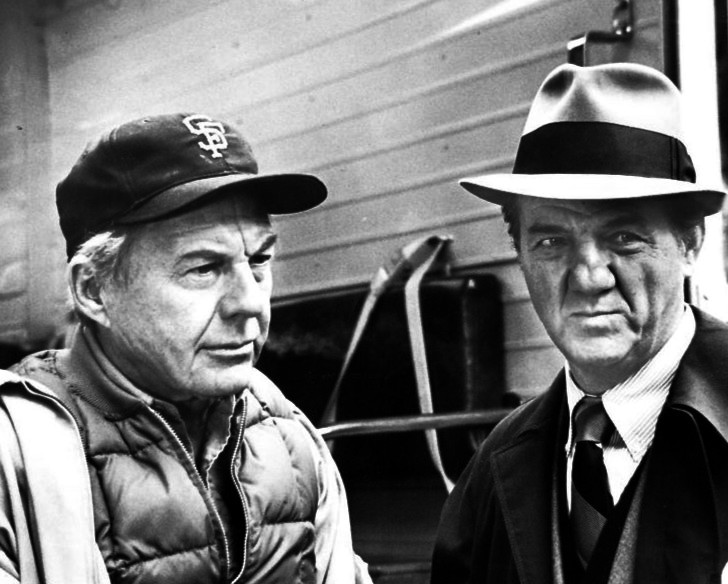
Malden (right) as Mike Stone, with David Wayne as Wally Sensibaugh in "In the Midst of Strangers" (Season 1, Episode 8)

Many actors guest-starred on the show; some were relatively unknown at the time and became successful stars in their own feature films or television series. Among them:

- Luther Adler
- Charles Aidman
- Claude Akins
- Jack Albertson
- Richard Anderson
- Michael Ansara
- Desi Arnaz Jr.
- Lew Ayres
- Meredith Baxter
- Ned Beatty
- Noah Beery Jr.
- Cal Bellini
- Carl Betz
- Len Birman
- Bill Bixby
- Sorrell Booke
- Tom Bosley
- Richard Bull
- Dennis Cole
- Dabney Coleman
- Nicolas Colasanto
- Marshall Colt
- Michael Constantine
- Pat Conway
- Joseph Cotten
- Tyne Daly
- John Davidson
- Susan Dey
- Howard Duff
- Patty Duke
- Richard Eastham
- Richard Egan
- Sam Elliott
- Lola Falana
- Jamie Farr
- Norman Fell
- Victor French
- Lou Frizzell
- Anthony Geary
- Paul Michael Glaser
- Ron Glass
- Larry Hagman
- Jean Hagen
- Mark Hamill
- Mariette Hartley
- Eileen Heckart
- Laurie Heineman
- Pat Hingle
- Earl Holliman
- Celeste Holm
- Clint Howard
- Vince Howard
- Rodolfo Hoyos Jr.
- Sam Jaffe
- Herbert Jefferson Jr.
- Don Johnson
- Gordon Jump
- Don Keefer
- Paula Kelly
- Wright King
- Tommy Kirk
- Bernie Kopell
- Martin Kove
- Cheryl Ladd
- Roscoe Lee Browne
- Kay Lenz
- Geoffrey Lewis
- Gary Lockwood
- Ida Lupino
- Mako
- Flip Mark
- Nora Marlowe
- Nan Martin
- A Martinez
- Wayne Maunder
- Maureen McCormick
- Gerald McRaney
- Eve McVeagh
- Vera Miles
- Vic Morrow
- Roger E. Mosley
- Edward Mulhare
- Ricky Nelson
- Leslie Nielsen
- Nick Nolte
- Sheree North
- Edmond O'Brien
- James Olson
- David Opatoshu
- Larry Pennell
- Edward Power
- Stefanie Powers
- Denver Pyle
- Robert Reed
- John Ritter
- Doris Roberts
- Pernell Roberts
- Andrew Robinson
- Marion Ross
- Albert Salmi
- Joe Santos
- Dick Sargent
- John Saxon
- Arnold Schwarzenegger
- Tom Selleck
- Martin Sheen
- Paul Sorvino
- David Soul
- Dean Stockwell
- Peter Strauss
- Michael Strong
- Richard Ely
- Hilary Thompson
- Brenda Vaccaro
- Dick Van Patten
- Robert Wagner
- Jessica Walter
- Beverly Washburn
- William C. Watson
- David Wayne
- Carl Weathers
- David White
- Stuart Whitman
- Larry Wilcox
- Van Williams
- William Windom
- James Woods
- Tony Young

Michael Douglas's mother Diana Douglas guest-starred in the season two episode "Chapel of the Damned".

== Broadcast history ==
Season	Episodes	Originally released		Nielsen Ratings
Season	Episodes	First released	Last released	Nielsen Ratings
Pilot		September 16, 1972		N/A
1	26	September 23, 1972	April 12, 1973	#56/ 15.5 rating
2	23	September 13, 1973	March 14, 1974	#22/ 20.8 rating
3	23	September 12, 1974	March 13, 1975	#22/ 21.3 rating
4	23	September 11, 1975	March 18, 1976	#26/ 20.7 rating
5	24	September 30, 1976	June 9, 1977	#52/ 18.0 rating
Television film		January 27, 1992		TBA

Sep 1972 – Jan 1973: Sat at 9:00–10:00 ET
Jan 1973 – Aug 1974: Thu at 10:00–11:00 ET
Sep 1974 – Sep 1976: Thu at 9:00–10:00 ET
Sep 1976 – Jun 1977: Thu at 10:00–11:00 ET

When the series debuted, it was slotted as counter programming opposite CBS' popular Saturday-night situation comedies, but failed to build an audience. The two-hour pilot movie ranked 58 out of 65 programs telecast that week, while the first regular episode of the series fared even lower at 62nd of 65 programs. In January 1973, ABC shook up its lineup by shuffling a number of its programs around. The Streets of San Francisco moved to Thursday night, and immediately increased its viewership to an 18.1 rating and 31 percent share of the audience. Over the next three years, the series flourished on Thursday, ranking number 22 for its second and third seasons and number 26 for its fourth. For the 1976–77 television season, ABC made the strategic error of moving the show up one hour, placing it in direct competition with Barnaby Jones, another Quinn Martin production. The two crime dramas virtually split their audience with Barnaby Jones ranking 49th and The Streets of San Francisco falling to 52nd of 104 shows for the season. The decline in viewership, coupled with steadily rising production costs and a new contract for star Karl Malden, prompted ABC to cancel the series.

In the United Kingdom, The Streets of San Francisco debuted on November 19, 1973, on ITV.

== Home media ==
=== Region 1 / Region 4 ===
CBS DVD (distributed by Paramount) has released all five seasons of The Streets of San Francisco on DVD in Region 1, and the first two seasons in Region 4. All seasons have been released in two volume sets.

On May 9, 2017, CBS DVD released The Streets of San Francisco- The Complete series on DVD in Region 1.

DVD Name	Ep # the	Release dates	
DVD Name	Ep # the	Region 1	Region 4
Season 1, Volume 1	16	April 10, 2007	October 1, 2009
Season 1, Volume 2	13	September 25, 2007	October 1, 2009
Season 2, Volume 1	11	July 1, 2008	October 1, 2009
Season 2, Volume 2	12	November 11, 2008	October 1, 2009
Season 3, Volume 1	11	July 3, 2012	N/A
Season 3, Volume 2	12	July 3, 2012	N/A
Season 4, Volume 1	11	August 28, 2012	N/A
Season 4, Volume 2	12	August 28, 2012	N/A
Season 5, Volume 1	12	October 30, 2012	N/A
Season 5, Volume 2	12	October 30, 2012	N/A
Seasons 1-3	73	2017	N/A
Complete Series	122	May 9, 2017	N/A

=== Region 2 ===
Paramount Home Entertainment has released the first two seasons of Streets of San Francisco on DVD in the UK.

DVD name	Ep #	Release date
Season 1	26	August 18, 2008
Season 2	23	September 14, 2009
