= Dane Witherspoon =

American actor (1957–2014)

- Born: Richard Dane Witherspoon; December 27, 1957; Denton, Texas, U.S.
- Died: March 29, 2014 (aged 56); Denver, Colorado, U.S.
- Occupation: Actor
- Years active: 1981–1997
- Spouses: Robin Wright (m. 1986; div. 1988) Tracy K. Shaffer (m. 1989; div. 2011)
- Children: 2

Dane Witherspoon (December 27, 1957 – March 29, 2014) was an American actor who appeared in daytime TV soap operas Santa Barbara as Joe Perkins in 1984, and in Capitol as Tyler McCandless from 1985 to 1986.

== Early life and career ==
At age 19, he was the youngest student ever accepted by the American Conservatory Theater (ACT) in San Francisco, California, appearing in productions from Shakespeare to Tennessee Williams. He performed one season at the Utah Shakespeare Festival. After getting his acting degree from ACT, Witherspoon went to Hollywood where he landed small roles in The Waltons and Eight Is Enough.

In 1984, he made his soap opera debut as the original Joe Perkins on Santa Barbara. Three months later, Dane was replaced by Mark Arnold. Dane soon returned to daytime as Tyler McCandless on Capitol; he played this part from 1985 to 1986. His film credits include Chameleons in 1989, the part of Brad Yates in the movie Seedpeople in 1992, and in 1997 he played a part in the TV movie Asteroid.

== Personal life ==
He met actress Robin Wright when they auditioned for Santa Barbara. The two were married from 1986 to 1988. Witherspoon had two sons with his second wife, actress / playwright Tracy Shaffer.

== Retirement and death ==
Although he continued to work as an actor for a few more years, Witherspoon eventually retired from the profession and lived in Denver, Colorado.

He died on March 29, 2014, at age 56.
