= Storm of the Century =

1999 horror TV miniseries directed by Craig R. Baxley

- Artwork for miniseries
- Genre: Drama; Horror; Fantasy; Thriller
- Written by: Stephen King
- Directed by: Craig R. Baxley
- Starring: Tim Daly; Colm Feore; Debrah Farentino; Casey Siemaszko; Jeffrey DeMunn
- Music by: Gary Chang
- Country of origin: United States
- Original language: English
- No. of episodes: 3

Production
- Executive producers: Stephen King; Mark Carliner
- Producer: Thomas H. Brodek
- Cinematography: David Connell
- Editor: Sonny Baskin
- Running time: 257 minutes
- Production companies: Mark Carliner Productions; Greengrass Productions
- Budget: $35,000,000

Original release
- Network: ABC
- Release: February 14 – February 18, 1999

Storm of the Century is a 1999 American horror television miniseries written by Stephen King and directed by Craig R. Baxley. It stars Tim Daly, Debrah Farentino, Casey Siemaszko, and Colm Feore. Unlike many other adaptations of King's work, it was not based on a novel. Rather, he called its screenplay a "novel for television". The screenplay was published as a mass-market book in February 1999 prior to TV broadcast.

The narrative is set on the fictional Little Tall Island in Maine, during a blizzard that cuts the ferry-based island community off from the mainland. The residents are terrorized by the arrival of André Linoge (Feore), a menacing stranger who knows their darkest secrets and demands a specific sacrifice with the ultimatum, "Give me what I want, and I'll go away."

It was broadcast on ABC from February 14–18, 1999, and received high viewership and critical acclaim for its performances and moral complexity. At release, The New York Times compared it to The Shining and Edgar Allan Poe. Retrospective reviews elevate the miniseries as a major influence on modern horror works, including Mike Flanagan's 2021 Netflix miniseries Midnight Mass. King has called Storm of the Century his personal favorite of all the TV productions related to his works.

== Plot ==
As the people of Little Tall Island, Maine, prepare for a powerful blizzard in 1989, elderly resident Martha Clarendon is brutally murdered by a menacing stranger. Town manager Robbie Beals investigates, and the stranger terrifies him by relating shameful secrets from his past. Mike Anderson, a supermarket manager and part-time constable, arrests the stranger, who identifies himself as André Linoge. Linoge seems to know the names and morbid secrets of all the island's residents and is particularly interested in Mike's son Ralphie, who has a birthmark on his nose. Yet he gives no hint of his own background, saying only, "Give me what I want, and I'll go away." While sitting in a jail cell, Linoge possesses the minds of several townspeople, causing suicides and a murder. He then escapes the jail in his true form of an old wizard and repeats his demand before disappearing into the storm.

The residents take shelter from the storm in the town hall. As they sleep, Linoge appears on the televisions as a televangelist and lectures them on the consequences of refusing to accommodate a stranger. The residents have the same dream in which authorities find the island deserted after the storm and the word "Croaton" carved on a tree. A news reporter connects the disappearance to the lost Roanoke Colony. Meanwhile Mike dreams that the townspeople walk into the ocean and drown. The next day, Linoge causes three residents to vanish while everyone is watching the lighthouse collapse. Two die, and the third, Angie Carver, is discovered alive but visibly aged. Ralphie goes missing and, when found in a closet, says that he was with Linoge. With each death and abduction, Linoge sends his demand again. While gathering supplies and toys for the children, Mike deduces that the name Linoge is an anagram and that Linoge's real name is Legion, similar to the biblical story of Jesus casting demons out of a man and into a herd of pigs.

The town's children fall under a spell and go to sleep, dreaming that they are flying through the clouds with Linoge. That evening Mike finds Linoge inside the town hall holding a resident hostage. Amused by Mike's sympathy for the townspeople, Linoge says that they are all sinners and criminals who merely pretend to be decent. He tells Mike to arrange a town meeting at 9:00 that night and escapes again. When the meeting gathers, Linoge tells the residents that he has lived thousands of years and, having grown old and sick, he wants a child whom he can raise to be a sorcerer like him. He cannot take a child by force, but the dream that the residents had will come true if they refuse. He leaves them to debate for half an hour. Mike urges the people to stand up to Linoge and is horrified when all of them, even his wife Molly, decide to give in. Linoge returns and presides over a lottery in which Ralphie is chosen. Taking his wizard form once more, Linoge contemptuously thanks the residents and advises them never to speak about what has happened. He then walks out of the town hall with Ralphie in his arms and flies into the night sky. Mike rushes outside and falls to his knees in the snow, begging for Ralphie back.

Embittered by the town's decision, Mike resigns as constable, divorces Molly, and leaves Little Tall. He returns to college and becomes a United States Marshal in San Francisco. Molly remarries to Hatch, the new town constable who was Mike's deputy. Several residents of Little Tall commit suicide over the years after struggling with remorse. One day Linoge and Ralphie walk past Mike in Chinatown, Ralphie having become corrupted and evil. Mike considers telling Molly what he saw, but accepts that some truths are best kept secret.

== Cast ==
- Tim Daly as Constable Michael "Mike" Anderson
- Debrah Farentino as Molly Anderson
- Dyllan Christopher as Ralph Emerick "Ralphie" Anderson
- Colm Feore as Andre Linoge / Reporter / Televangelist
- Jeffrey DeMunn as Town Manager Robert "Robbie" Beals
- Nada Despotovich as Sandra "Sandy" Beals
- Spencer Breslin as Donny Beals
- Denis Forest as Kirk Freeman
- Nicky Guadagni as Jenna Freeman
- Julianne Nicholson as Katrina "Kat" Withers
- Casey Siemaszko as Alton "Hatch" Hatcher
- Soo Garay as Melinda Hatcher
- Skye McCole Bartusiak as Pippa Hatcher
- Ron Perkins as Peter Godsoe
- Becky Ann Baker as Ursula Godsoe
- Cayda Rubin as Sally Godsoe
- Nancy Beatty as Octavia Godsoe
- Richard Fitzpatrick as Jonas Stanhope
- Kathleen Chalfant as Joanna Stanhope
- Myra Carter as Cora Stanhope
- Rita Tuckett as Martha Claredon
- Christopher Marren as Henry Bright
- Tyler Bannerman as Frank Bright
- Adam Zolotin as Davey Hopewell
- Gaylyn Britton as Mary Hopewell
- Michael Rhoades as Stan Hopewell
- Steve Rankin as Jack Carver
- Torri Higginson as Angela Carver
- Stephen Joffe as Buster Carver
- Kay Tremblay as Robbie Beals' false mother
- Adam LeFevre as Ferd Andrews
- Peter MacNeill as Sonny Brautigan
- Beth Dixon as Tess Merchant
- Leif Anderson as Johnny Harriman
- Marcia Laskowski as Linda St. Pierre
- Harley English-Dixon as Heidi St. Pierre
- Gerard Parkes as Orville Boucher
- Richard Blackburn as Andy Robichaux
- Jeremy Jordan as William "Billy" Soames
- Lynne Griffin as Jane Kingsbury
- Stephen King as plaintiff attorney

== Production ==
The screenplay for the miniseries was written by Stephen King expressly for television. The screenplay was published as a mass-market book by Pocket Books just prior to the initial airing of Storm of the Century on ABC. The book included photographs of the TV miniseries. The book contains an introduction in which King describes the genesis of the idea as it occurred to him in late 1996. Beginning to write it in December 1996, he initially debated if the story should be either a novel or a screenplay. He described the result as a "novel for television". A hardcover edition was written as a screenplay rather than "prose", and was published concurrently by the Book of the Month Club.

Storm of the Century was filmed in Southwest Harbor, Maine and Toronto in 1998. It is set on the fictional Little Tall Island in Maine, the same as King's novel Dolores Claiborne. The location is canonically mapped in the opening credits of the 2018 Hulu series Castle Rock, when a map of Maine explicitly labels Little Tall Island with the annotation "Storm of the Century".

== Release ==
Storm of the Century aired on ABC on February 14–18, 1999. It was released on DVD on June 22, 1999.

== Reception ==
Upon its broadcast in 1999, Storm of the Century received critical acclaim. Ken Tucker of Entertainment Weekly rated it at A− and stated, "We benefit from the fact that King is a TV dabbler — he doesn't know you're not supposed to chew over interesting ethical dilemmas about personal responsibility in a piece of February sweeps programming. King wants to scare your pants off while also removing your moral blinders, and he succeeds." The New York Times critic Caryn James said: "As chilling and gripping as any Stephen King film since Stanley Kubrick's classic movie of The Shining, this six-hour miniseries works the way the most enduring horror tales do, stretching back to Edgar Allan Poe by blending supernatural events with purely human psychological terror." In Variety, Laura Fries predicted this: "A morality play disguised as horror, this three-part miniseries should win over a few remaining Stephen King holdouts while reinforcing the devotion of legions of fans."

On Rotten Tomatoes, the film holds an approval rating of 82% based on 22 reviews, with an average rating of 7.33/10. The website's critical consensus describes "Chilling performances and an even darker moral dilemma".

Retrospective reviews are elevated. SlashFilm called it a "morality play". MovieWeb calls the production "one of the greatest horror miniseries ever produced". In 2024, Den of Geek ranked it among King's most significant television works and said, "the original screenplay retains a purity of vision often lost in novel adaptations".

U.S. Television Ratings:

No.	Title	Original air date	U.S. viewers (millions)
1	Storm of the Century, Part 1	February 14, 1999	19.4
2	Storm of the Century, Part 2	February 15, 1999	18.9
3	Storm of the Century, Part 3	February 18, 1999	19.2

== Legacy ==
Director Mike Flanagan has cited Storm of the Century as a major influence on his 2021 Netflix miniseries Midnight Mass.

The 2025 series It: Welcome to Derry references Storm of the Century in Andre Linoge's refrain, "Give me what I want, and I'll go away", which canonicalized the phrase within the larger King macroverse.

In 2020, King stated Storm of the Century was his personal favorite television adaptation of his work.

== See also ==
- List of adaptations of works by Stephen King
