= Cellar Dweller =

1988 film by John Carl Buechler

- Directed by: John Carl Buechler
- Written by: Don Mancini
- Produced by: Bob Wynn; Charles Band (executive)
- Starring: Yvonne De Carlo; Debrah Farentino; Brian Robbins; Pamela Bellwood; Vince Edwards; Jeffrey Combs
- Edited by: Barry Zetlin
- Music by: Carl Dante
- Distributed by: Empire Pictures
- Release dates: February 15, 1988 (United Kingdom); September 20, 1988 (United States)
- Running time: 77 minutes
- Country: United States / Italy
- Language: English
- Budget: $850,000

Cellar Dweller is a 1988 American-Italian monster horror film about a comic book artist who unleashes a demon after drawing it. It was directed by John Carl Buechler, written by Don Mancini (credited as Kit Du Bois), and stars Debrah Farentino and Brian Robbins. As of 2026, this is the only film not in the Child's Play series that was written by Mancini.

== Plot ==
Colin Childress, a highly successful comic book artist who gains inspiration from a mystical book of horrific drawings, inadvertently summons an evil spirit into his basement studio. Decades later, his house has become a small art institute run by the stern Mrs. Briggs. One night, comely student Whitney Taylor goes rooting around the sealed boxes in the cellar and releases the supernatural forces trapped there.

== Cast ==
- Debrah Farentino as Whitney Taylor (credited as Debrah Mullowney)
- Brian Robbins as Phillip Lemley
- Vince Edwards as Norman Meshelski
- Cheryl-Ann Wilson as Lisa
- Jeffrey Combs as Colin Childress
- Pamela Bellwood as Amanda
- Yvonne De Carlo as Mrs. Briggs

== Release ==
Cellar Dweller was released directly to VHS videocassette and LaserDisc on September 20, 1988, by New World Video. In 1991, Starmaker Entertainment released a VHS tape in EP mode. MGM released an Amazon.com Exclusive VHS on September 29, 2006.

On October 29, 2013, the film was released on DVD by Scream Factory as part of the second volume of its All-Night Horror Marathon series, along with Contamination .7, Catacombs, and The Dungeonmaster. Scream Factory released Cellar Dweller as a Blu-ray double feature with Catacombs on July 14, 2015.

== Reception ==
Anthony Arrigo from Dread Central gave the film 3 stars out of 5, writing, "Cellar Dweller might not be quite up to the level some of Empire's celebrated cult classics have attained, but with equivocal production design and a few familiar faces – not to mention great FX work – it's another unique picture worth watching." TV Guide was more negative, giving the film 1 of 5 stars, and opining, "An enjoyable although not particularly distinguished effort, Cellar Dweller has a number of small worthwhile moments. Director Buechler gets the most out of a somewhat limited script, pacing the action nicely, and the special effects are adequate – but, like everything else in this film, small and limited in scale."
