= 200 (Criminal Minds) =

- Criminal Minds episode
- JJ (A. J. Cook) with Hotch (Thomas Gibson) after being rescued by the BAU.
- Episode no.: Season 9 Episode 14
- Directed by: Larry Teng
- Written by: Rick Dunkle
- Original air date: February 5, 2014
- Running time: 42 minutes

Guest appearances
- Paget Brewster as Emily Prentiss; Tahmoh Penikett as Michael Hastings; Faran Tahir as Tivon Askari; Josh Stewart as William LaMontagne Jr.; Nicholas Brendon as Kevin Lynch; Debrah Farentino as Undersecretary Rosemary Jackson; Brian Appel as Agent Anderson; Jayne Atkinson as Erin Strauss; Esai Morales as Section Chief Mateo Cruz

Episode chronology
← Previous "The Road Home"	Next → "Mr. & Mrs. Anderson"
- Criminal Minds season 9

"200" is the fourteenth episode of the ninth season of the American police procedural crime drama television series Criminal Minds, and the 200th episode overall, The episode aired on CBS on February 5, 2014, and was written by Rick Dunkle and directed by Larry Teng.

At the time of its initial release, the episode was watched by 12.92 million viewers and received mixed reviews but television critics praised A.J. Cook's performance.

== Plot ==
After being abducted at the end of the previous episode, JJ (A. J. Cook) wakes up bound and gagged. She recognizes her captor, who drugs her.

In a flashback to the U.S. Operations Camp in Afghanistan in 2010, JJ meets with Section Chief Erin Strauss (Jayne Atkinson). JJ has been assigned to a task force that is looking for Osama bin Laden, and will interrogate female suspects without the brutality used on male suspects. JJ meets Mateo Cruz (Esai Morales), the head of the taskforce; senior CIA operative Michael Hastings (Tahmoh Penikett); and Tivon Askari (Faran Tahir), her interpreter.

In the present day, the BAU learns of JJ's disappearance and the truth of her past relationship with their new Section Chief, Cruz, who is also missing. While looking through JJ's old office, Rossi (Joe Mantegna) and Blake (Jeanne Tripplehorn) find classified documents about JJ's 2010 mission, code-named "Integrity". Hotch (Thomas Gibson) goes to the Department of State to see Under Secretary of State for Arms Control and International Security Affairs Rosemary Jackson (Debrah Farentino), the creator of JJ's taskforce. Under Secretary Jackson reveals Tivon Askari as the perpetrator, but, to avoid government scandal, bans the BAU from the investigation. Despite the ban, Hotch calls in reinforcements: Emily Prentiss (Paget Brewster), former BAU agent, now head of Interpol.

The BAU classifies Askari as a serial killer and identifies his pattern. Askari tortures JJ and Cruz with water boarding, electrocution, and, for JJ, attempted rape, in order to get security codes to "Integrity". JJ realizes that Askari is working with someone else, and, although the team initially suspects Cruz, Hastings is the real mole. His death via a roadside bomb in Afghanistan, which caused JJ to miscarry, was faked.

While the team looks for JJ and Cruz, "Blackbird" (JJ) appears on Garcia (Kirsten Vangsness)’s computer screen. She and Kevin (Nicholas Brendon) are arrested for their hacking, but are able to relay JJ's location. The team arrives at Hastings' hideout where they find Cruz non-fatally stabbed in the stomach by Askari, and Hotch shoots Askari to death before he can kill JJ. While the rest of the team guns down Hastings' remaining henchmen, JJ and Prentiss corner Hastings on the roof and fight him until he eventually falls to his death. After JJ is medically cleared and Garcia and Kevin released from custody, the team celebrates at a bar and bids farewell to Prentiss before she heads back to London.

== Production ==
On September 30, 2013, it was announced that former cast member Paget Brewster would return for the 200th episode and reprise her role as Emily Prentiss. On January 21, 2014, it was announced that Battlestar Galactica star Tahmoh Penikett had been cast in a key role as Michael Hastings.

Speaking about the 200th episode, A.J. Cook revealed that the episode will delve in to JJ's time away from the BAU during Season 6

"We're going to use the serendipitous gift of Season 6 to explain with flashbacks what happened when she was working for the Pentagon and why she came back as a much tougher character. I've never had a chance to flex my acting muscles like this on the show!".

Cook also revealed that she performed most of her own stunts during the episode - some of which Cook says she actually experienced so the show would look authentic. One of the stunts was being waterboarded.

This is the first time since the pilot episode that the opening credits were not shown as more time was needed for the episode footage, so the credits were cut, and the stars names were listed during the first scene following the teaser.

== Reception ==
=== Ratings ===
The episode aired on CBS on February 5, 2014. Upon initial release, it was viewed by 12.92 million people and it also garnered a 2.8/7 Nielsen rating. "200" was also the week's third most watched drama and ranked tenth on the list of most watched television programmes overall. The episode also received 3.48 million more viewers in Live+7 ratings, bringing the viewer total to 16.39 million.

=== Critical response ===
"200" was met with mixed reviews. The episode has received an average score of 7.1 out of 10 in IMDb.

Gel Galang from the International Business Times gave the episode a positive review, calling it "an episode to remember" and said that it "does live up to its name and hype." TV Fanatic gave the episode 4.8/5 stars, saying that "Expectations for this installment were high. And I can say for sure that it met them with flying colors" but criticized the show for condensing the story into one episode, "it seems this story could well have been stretched over a few more episodes." Patty Gopez from TV Over Mind gave the episode a mixed review, saying that while the episode was emotional, it all "seemed fairly predictable."
