= John Conboy =

American soap opera producer (1934–2018)

- Born: March 18, 1934; Binghamton, New York, U.S.
- Died: January 19, 2018 (aged 83); Palm Desert, California, U.S.
- Education: Carnegie Mellon University
- Occupations: Scriptwriter; screenwriter; producer
- Years active: 1970–2004

John Conboy (March 18, 1934 – January 19, 2018) was an American soap opera producer best known as the writer and producer of the soap operas Love Is a Many Splendored Thing, The Young and the Restless, Capitol and Guiding Light.

== Life and career ==
Conboy was born in 1934 in Binghamton, New York. After high school, he graduated from Carnegie Mellon University's College of Fine Arts.

Conboy started his entertainment career as an actor. In 1970, he switched to a producing role, starting with the show Love is a Many Splendored Thing. He won an Emmy Award in 1973 as a producer on The ABC Afternoon Playbreak. Conboy then became a producer on The Young and the Restless, eventually rising to executive producer and earning two more Emmys.

In 1982, Conboy left The Young and the Restless and became executive producer of the newly created CBS soap opera Capitol. He served as the show's executive producer until the series was cancelled in 1987. During the last few years of Capitol, he created Casino which was set in Las Vegas. It was not picked up.

Conboy was hired as executive producer of the NBC Daytime soap opera Santa Barbara in 1990, and won his fourth Emmy Award as producer. However, the show's ratings did not improve, and he was let go in 1991. In December 2002, after nearly a decade of not working in daytime, Conboy was hired as executive producer of Guiding Light, succeeding longtime executive producer Paul Rauch, who stepped down the month prior and interim executive Mary Alice Dwyer-Dobbin. One-year later, Conboy reportedly walked out of his role as executive producer as Guiding Light following several disputes with the serial's producers Procter & Gamble, however, he later returned. In a statement, Conboy stated: "Procter & Gamble, CBS and I agree that my work on Guiding Light is not finished. I look forward to continuing our incredible partnership and all the terrific stories we have yet to tell." In February 2004, it was announced that Conboy would no longer serve as executive producer; Ellen Wheeler was named as his successor.

Conboy died in 2018.

== Positions held ==
Capitol

- Executive Producer (March 1982– March 1987)

Guiding Light

- Executive Producer (December 26, 2002 – March 15, 2004)

Love Is a Many Splendored Thing

- Producer (1970–1973)

Santa Barbara

- Executive Producer (March 1990 – June 1991)

The Young and the Restless

- Executive Producer (March 26, 1973 – December 31, 1981)

The ABC Afternoon Playbreak: "The Other Woman"

After Hours: From Janice, John, Mary and Michael, with Love

After Hours: Singin', Swingin' and All That Jazz

The Solitary Man (directed by John Llewellyn Moxey & written by Jim Byrnes)

== Awards and nominations ==
Daytime Emmy Awards

Wins

- (1990; Outstanding Drama Series; Santa Barbara)
- (1975 & 1983; Outstanding Drama Series; The Young and the Restless)
- (1974; Outstanding Drama Special)

Nominations

- (1990; Outstanding Drama Series; Santa Barbara)
- (1975–1976, 1978–1979, 1983; Outstanding Drama Series; The Young and the Restless)
