= Darleen Carr =

American actress, singer, and voice-over artist

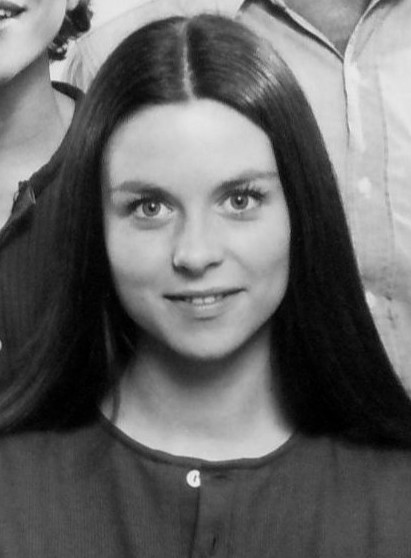
- Carr on The Smith Family, 1970
- Born: Darlene Farnon; December 12, 1950 (age 75); Chicago, Illinois, U.S.
- Other names: Darlene Carr; Darleen Drake
- Occupations: Actress, singer
- Years active: 1963–2001
- Known for: Playing Shanti in Disney's The Jungle Book
- Relatives: Shannon Farnon (sister); Charmian Carr (sister)

Darleen Carr (born Darlene Farnon; December 12, 1950) is an American retired actress, singer, and voice-over artist. She is also known as Darlene Carr or Darleen Drake. She has two sisters, both actresses (Shannon Farnon and Charmian Carr).

== Early years ==
Carr was born in Chicago, Illinois on December 12, 1950. Her father Brian Farnon was the orchestra leader at Harrah's Lake Tahoe, and her mother, Rita Oehman, performed in The Oehman Twins singing act. Before Darlene's 11th birthday, the Farnons relocated to Mission Hills in the San Fernando Valley, and she later attended North Hollywood High School.

== Career ==
Carr's only television series in which she had a lead billing was the short-lived CBS sitcom Miss Winslow & Son (1979), in which she played Susan Winslow, the single mother and titular character. In 1965–1966, Carr played Kathy, a student at a private girls' academy in California on The John Forsythe Show. She was a regular on the 1969 version of the variety series Dean Martin Presents the Gold Diggers and played Cindy Smith in the 1971–1972 comedy-drama The Smith Family.

Carr also had recurring roles as Margaret Devlin in the series The Oregon Trail (1977) and the editor, reporter and photographer of the town newspaper in the 1981–1982 television series Bret Maverick.

Carr portrayed Kathleen "Kick" Kennedy, John F. Kennedy's favorite sister, in Young Joe, the Forgotten Kennedy, and she played a lead role in the miniseries Once an Eagle (1976). She portrayed the daughter of Karl Malden's character on 12 episodes of The Streets of San Francisco (1972–77), and in the TV movie Back to the Streets of San Francisco (1992).

On television during the 1970s and 1980s she was a guest on such shows as The F.B.I. (on 2 episodes); The Virginian; Alias Smith and Jones; Marcus Welby, M.D. (2 episodes); Chopper One; The Rookies (3 episodes); The Waltons; S.W.A.T.; Medical Center (3 episodes); Man from Atlantis; Fantasy Island; The Paper Chase; Barnaby Jones (3 episodes); The White Shadow; Vega$; Quincy, M.E.; Charlie's Angels; V; Mayberry R.F.D.; Murder, She Wrote; Magnum, P.I.; Family Affair; and Simon & Simon (4 episodes). In 1994, she appeared as Ambassador E'Tyshra on Star Trek: Deep Space Nine. She also guest-starred in 1976 in the first episode of the final series of the British TV series Thriller.

Her film roles included appearances in Monkeys, Go Home! (1967) —her film debut, The Impossible Years (1968) with David Niven, Death of a Gunfighter (1969) with Richard Widmark, The Beguiled (1971) with Clint Eastwood, Eight Days a Week (1997) with Keri Russell, and TV horror movies such as The Horror at 37,000 Feet (1973) and the TV remake of Piranha (1995).

She is also a singer and sang in The Sound of Music, dubbing the high singing voice for Duane Chase as Kurt, and several of her sister Charmian's high solo parts. She sang in Walt Disney's The Jungle Book as The Girl. She was under contract to RCA Records, played Abigail Adams in 1776 at the Long Beach Civic Light Opera, released the album The Carr-De Belles Band, and performed at Vine St. Bar and Grill in Hollywood with her band.

Carr was also part of a behind-the-scenes exhibition titled Walt Disney’s The Jungle Book: Making a Masterpiece during a special talk alongside Andreas Deja, Floyd Norman and Bruce Reitherman, which took place on June 22, 2022. The exhibition took place at The Walt Disney Family Museum from June 23, 2022 to January 8, 2023.

She has played Melissa Gardner in the A.R Gurney play Love Letters: once at The Grove Theater in 1992 with Jameson Parker and for the BVS Cultural Arts Association's production on October 15, 2022.

== Award nominations ==
In 1977, she was nominated for the Best Supporting Actress Golden Globe for her performance in the miniseries Once an Eagle.

== Filmography ==
Date	Title	Role	Notes
1967	Monkeys, Go Home!	Sidoni Riserau	
1967	The Jungle Book	Shanti (voice)	
1968	The Impossible Years	Abbey Kingsley	
1969	The Governor & J.J.	Marcy	Episode: "Rhyme with Reason"
1969	Death of a Gunfighter	Hilda Jorgenson	
1971	The Beguiled	Doris	
1971-1972	The Smith Family	Cindy Smith	Main cast - 39 episodes
1972-1974	The Rookies	Pip Brent/Nancy Leigh	3 episodes
1972-1975	Medical Center	Vivian Stacy/Jenny	3 episodes
1972	All My Darling Daughters	Susan	ABC Movie of the Week
1972	Alias Smith and Jones	Kate Lewis	Episode: "McGuffin"
1973	The Horror at 37,000 Feet	Margot	TV movie
1973	Runaway!	Carol Lerner	ABC Movie of the Week
1973-1978	Barnaby Jones	Julia Shoemaker/Vicki Singer/Julie Barton	3 episodes
1973	My Darling Daughters' Anniversary	Susan	ABC Movie of the Week; sequel to All My Darling Daughters
1973-1977	The Streets of San Francisco	Jeannie Stone	12 episodes
1974	The Chadwick Family	Joan Chadwick McTaggert	ABC Movie of the Week
1974	Chopper One	Rissa Galey	Episode: "The Hijacking"
1975	S.W.A.T.	Meredith Cooper	Episode: "Pressure Cooker"
1975	The Manhunter	Carol	Episode: "The Seventh Man"
1975	Caribe	Olivia Hardin	Episode: "Flowers of Death"
1975	The Waltons	Sis Bradford	Episode: "The Beguiled"
1976	Jigsaw John	Ellen Kirsch	Episode: "Follow the Yellow Brick Road"
1976	City of Angels	Alice Cole	Episode: "A Sudden Silence"
1977	Young Joe, the Forgotten Kennedy	Kathleen Kennedy	TV film
1977	Man from Atlantis	Dr. Mary Smith	Episode: "The Disappearances"
1977	Once an Eagle	Tommy Caldwell	Miniseries - 7 episodes (NBC)
1977-1978	The Oregon Trail	Margaret Devlin	13 episodes
1978	Insight	Eve	Episode: "Just Before Eve"
1978	Fantasy Island	Dora Delaney	Episode: "Superstar/Salem"
1978	The Paper Chase	Leanne Laski	Episode: "A Day in the Life of... "
1978	Flying High	Sofia	Episode: "Beautiful People"
1979	Miss Winslow and Son	Susan Winslow	6 episodes
1979	Eischied	Hannah	Episode: "Who is the Missing Woman?"
1980	Rage!	Dr. Matlock	TV movie
1980	VEGA$	Robyn Andrews	Episode: "The Man who was Twice"
1980	The White Shadow	Ellen Jensen	Episode: "Salami's Affair"
1981	Charlie's Angels	Darlene Warden	Episode: "Attack Angels
1981	The Misadventures of Sheriff Lobo	Social Worker	Episode: "Another Day, Another Bomb"
1981-1982	Bret Maverick	Mary Lou Springer	18 episodes
1981-1986	Simon & Simon	Shannon McGovern/Anita	4 episodes
1983-1986	Magnum, P.I.	Heather Wilcox/Ginny Malcolm	2 episodes
1984	Blue Thunder	Aggie Mills	Episode: "Arms Race"
1985	Murder, She Wrote	Trish Mercer	Episode: "School for Scandal"
1985	V	Joanne Davis	Episode: "The Rescue"
1985	Crazy Like a Fox	Donna Burns	Episode: "The Man Who Cried Fox"
1985	Riptide	Marlene Lewis	Episode: "Who Really Watches the Sunset?"
1986	Blacke's Magic	Beth Hartley	Episode: "A Friendly Game of Showdown"
1994	Star Trek: Deep Space Nine	Ambassador E'Tyshra	Episode: "Armageddon Game"
1995	Piranha	Dr. Leticia Baines	TV movie
1996–1997	The Real Adventures of Jonny Quest	Abby, President Stasny (voice)	4 episodes
1997	Eight Days a Week	Erica's mother	
1998	The Secret of NIMH 2: Timmy to the Rescue	Helen (voice)	Direct-to-video
