= Ginger Alden =

Fiancée of Elvis Presley at the time of his death

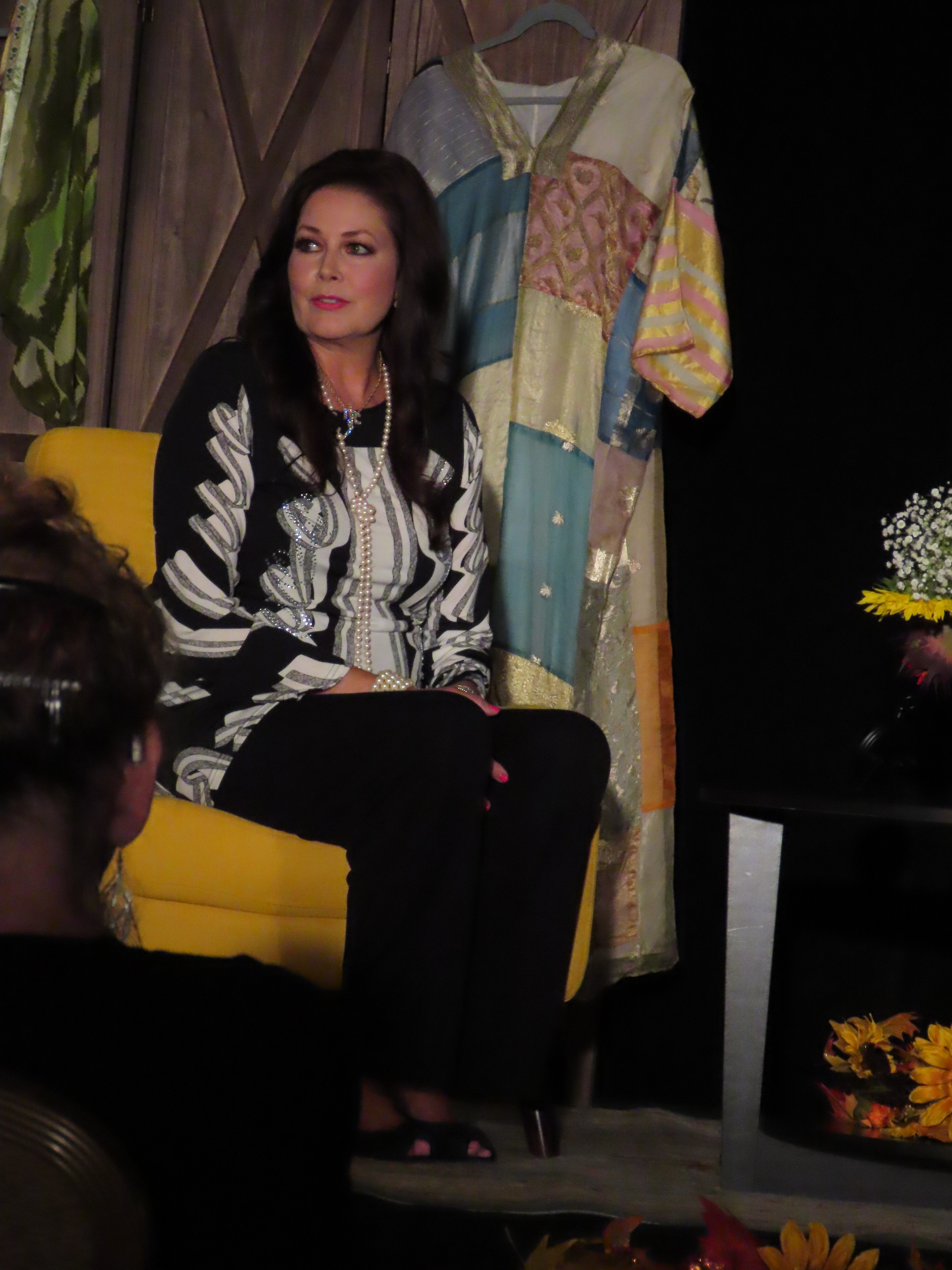
- Born: November 13, 1956 (age 69); Millington, Tennessee, U.S.
- Known for: Author, fiancée to Elvis Presley
- Spouse: Ron Leyser (m. 1991; died 2015)
- Children: 1

Ginger Alden Leyser (born November 13, 1956) is an American actress and model known for her relationship with Elvis Presley. She was engaged to Presley at the time of his death in 1977. After his death she worked in television and authored a memoir.

== Biography ==
Ginger Alden was born on November 13, 1956 to Jo and Walter Alden at the US Naval Hospital in Millington, Tennessee. Her father was a public relations officer in the United States Army. Alden began her modeling career at a young age, during which she participated in beauty pageants.

Alden first met Presley when she was five years old, and later again when she was 20 and he was 41. After two months of dating, Presley proposed to her with a diamond engagement ring, with the 11.5-carat center stone taken from his famous TCB ring. Their wedding date was scheduled for December 25, 1977, but Presley died on August 16th. After Presley's death, Ginger Alden made a career in modeling and acting.

She later married Ron Leyser in 1991, and they have one son, named Hunter.

In 2014, Alden released "Elvis and Ginger", a memoir detailing her relationship with Presley.

Ron Leyser died on August 16, 2015, exactly 38 years after Elvis Presley.
