= Christine Kellogg =

American choreographer and director

Christine Kellogg is an American director and choreographer. She is the artistic director of PenArts.

== Early career ==
Kellogg has worked at the Utah Shakespeare Festival, Ahmanson Theatre, Mark Taper Forum, Kirk Douglas Theatre, South Coast Repertory, Arsht Center, Jerry Herman Ring Theatre, PalmBeach Dramaworks, Riverside Theatre, and the Kravis Center. Kellogg received the "Honorable Mention Award" at the New York Short Film Festival for her work as director/choreographer on the film "Dancing the Tide", in which her children appeared. She has been the recipient of a Drama-Logue Award and Burns Mantle Awards.

Kellogg began dancing at the age of 5 and trained with the Royal Ballet in London, the Oakland Ballet, Ballet de Jerez, and the Fort Worth Ballet. She has performed on Broadway, National and International tours, television and film. She holds a BA in Cultural Anthropology from UCLA.

Kellogg began her career as a dancer on Broadway. While in New York, she joined the American Dance Machine as a principal dancer and toured Japan, Europe and the United States. With them, she worked with Agnes DeMille, Bob Fosse, Peter Gennaro, Ron Field, Yehuda Hyman, and Michael Shawn. She continued performing on and off Broadway before beginning her television acting career, which included roles on Capitol, Hill St Blues, It's Garry Shandling Show, The Tracey Ullman Show, Dynasty, and General Hospital. Moving from New York City to Los Angeles, Kellogg concentrated on her acting career and appeared in television programs, commercials, and films.

== Current career ==
Kellogg has previously been a member of the faculty in the UCLA Film/TV/Theatre department, University of Miami Department of Theatre Arts, and the Theatre Department at the University of West Florida. She is a freelance director/choreographer and the artistic director of PenArts at The Gordon in Pensacola, Florida.

== Representation of some work ==
- Glory, Director, The Gordon, Pensacola, FL
- Murder Ballad, The Gordon, Pensacola, FL - Downtown Pensacola https://downtownpensacola.com/events/6182f2c0a2766a0b74e8aa05
- The Hello Girls, The Gordon, Pensacola, FL- WEAR TV https://weartv.com/news/local/musical-coming-to-pensacola-highlights-women-who-served-during-world-war-i
- American Mariachi, The Gordon, Pensacola, FL- FooFooFest https://foofoofest.com/2022-events/american-mariachi-presented-penarts/
- The Revolutionists, The Gordon, Pensacola, FL - WUWF https://www.wuwf.org/community-calendar/event/the-revolutionists-13-06-2022-12-58-32
- Woody Guthrie's American Song, Palm Beach Dramaworks, Palm Beach, FL
- Man of La Mancha, Kravitz Center, Palm Beach, FL
- Shakespeare In Love, MainStage Theatre, UWF, Pensacola, FL- FooFooFest https://foofoofest.com/2021-events/shakespeare-in-love-presented-by-uwf/
- "Small Window", Director/Choreographer, Whitefire Theatre, Los Angeles, CA
- "Into the Woods", Assistant Director/Choreographer, Randall Theatre, Utah Shakespeare Festival
- "The Greenshow", Choreographer, Utah Shakespeare Festival
- "Girls vs. Boys", Choreographer, Carnival Theatre, Arsht Center, Miami - TheatreMania https://www.theatermania.com/shows/florida-theater/miami-theater/girls-vs-boys_192836/
- "Les Miserables", Choreographer, Randall Theatre, Utah Shakespeare Festival - About the Artists https://www.bard.org/about/artists/
- "Scapin", Choreographer, Randall Theatre, Utah Shakespeare Festival - About the Artists https://www.bard.org/about/artists/
- "Twelfth Night", Choreographer, Pensacola Shakespeare Theatre, Pensacola, FL
- "Pal Joey", Choreographer, Boston Court Theatre, Los Angeles, CA
- "Night Train to Bolina", Choreographer, University of Miami, FL
- "Our Town", co-director, University of Miami, FL
- "Rent", Co-director/Choreographer, University of Miami
- "Dancing the Tide" (2010), Director/Choreographer, NY Short Film Festival
- "Without Walls", Choreographer, Mark Taper Forum, Los Angeles, CA - TheatreMania https://www.theatermania.com/news/without-walls_8436/
- "The Cherry Orchard", Choreographer, Mark Taper Forum, Los Angeles, CA - About the Artists https://www.abouttheartists.com/productions/94165-the-cherry-orchard-at-mark-taper-forum-february-2-march-19-2006
- "A Perfect Wedding", Choreographer, Kirk Douglas Theatre, Los Angeles, CA
- "Stuff Happens", Choreographer, Mark Taper Forum, Los Angeles, CA - Curtain Up http://www.curtainup.com/stuffhappensla.html
- "Gordon Davidson Gala", Choreographer, Ahmanson Theatre, Los Angeles, CA
- "Italian Straw Hat", Choreographer, South Coast Repertory Theatre, Costa Mesa, CA
- "No Strings", Choreographer, Freud Playhouse, Los Angeles, CA
- "Norman's Ark", Choreographer, John Anson Ford Theatre, Los Angeles, CA
- "Break-Up Notebook", Choreographer, Diversionary Theatre, San Diego, CA - San Diego Union Tribune https://www.sandiegouniontribune.com/sdut-funny-touching-break-up-notebook-has-broad-2007jul18-story.html
- "Lesson", Choreographer, Lee Strasberg Theatre, Los Angeles, CA
- "Chicken Soup for the Soul", Choreographer, TV series, Los Angeles, CA
- "Capitol", played Leann Foster, CBS TV series, Los Angeles, CA
- "It's Garry Shandling's Show", guest-star multiple times, Los Angeles, CA
- "Who's the Boss?", guest-star, Los Angeles, CA
- "Dynasty" guest-star, Los Angeles, CA
- "Hill Street Blues" guest-star, Los Angeles, CA
- "The Tracey Ullman Show" guest-star, Los Angeles, CA
- "The Beastmaster" Witchwoman, Los Angeles, CA
- "So FIne" Jeans Model, Los Angeles, CA
- "Annie" dancer, Los Angeles, CA
- "Bert Rigby, You're a Fool" dancer, Los Angeles, CA
- "American Dance Machine" principal dancer
- "Blame It On the Movies" Christine, Broadway, NYC
- "Cincinnati Pops" principal dancer, Cincinnati, OH
- "Scorchers" Thais, Whitefire Theatre, Los Angeles, CA
- "Scenes From a Tango" Julie, Los Angeles and NYC
