= Back to the Streets of San Francisco =

- Genre: Drama; Mystery
- Based on: characters from ''Poor, Poor Ophelia by Carolyn Weston
- Written by: William Robert Yates
- Directed by: Mel Damski
- Starring: Karl Malden; Darleen Carr; Debrah Farentino
- Theme music composer: Patrick Williams
- Country of origin: United States
- Original language: English

Production
- Executive producers: Aaron Spelling; E. Duke Vincent
- Production location: San Francisco
- Cinematography: Shelly Johnson
- Editor: Michael S. Murphy
- Running time: 95 minutes
- Production companies: Torand Productions; Spelling Entertainment

Original release
- Network: NBC
- Release: January 27, 1992

Back to the Streets of San Francisco is a 1992 American made-for-television crime drama film based on the 1972–1977 series The Streets of San Francisco. It stars Karl Malden as police detective Mike Stone and Darleen Carr as his daughter Jeannie, both cast members of the original show. It was directed by Mel Damski and broadcast on NBC on January 27, 1992.

== Plot ==
Mike Stone, newly promoted to Captain of Inspectors, must solve the murder of his old partner, Steve Keller (played in the original series by Michael Douglas, who chose not to appear in the film). Flashbacks of Keller appear from the original show, and he is shown in a framed picture on Stone's desk.

At the same time, Stone is trying to decide which of two competing inspectors, Sarah Burns or David O'Connor, should take his place as the lieutenant in charge of homicide.

== Cast ==
- Karl Malden as Mike Stone
- Michael Douglas as Steve Keller (seen in flashbacks)
- Debrah Farentino as Sarah Burns
- Conor O'Farrell as David O'Connor
- Carl Lumbly as Charlie Walker
- Darleen Carr as Jeannie Stone
- Paul Benjamin as Henry Brown
- Robert Parnell as Sam Hendrix
- William Daniels as Judge Julius Burns
- Nick Scoggin as Carl Murchinson
- Ed Vasgersian as Sergeant Pasarella
- Lorri Holt as Anne Keller
- Rod Gnapp as Razor
- Keith Douglas as Jacob Stubbs
- Amy Resnick as Diana West
- Richard Dupell as J.T. the Clown

== Reception ==
In the weekly Nielsen rating period of January 27 - February 2, 1992, the TV movie received a 13.2 rating and 20 share. 18.9 million viewers watched, ranking #23 out of 84 network programs aired.
