= Debrah Farentino =

American actress

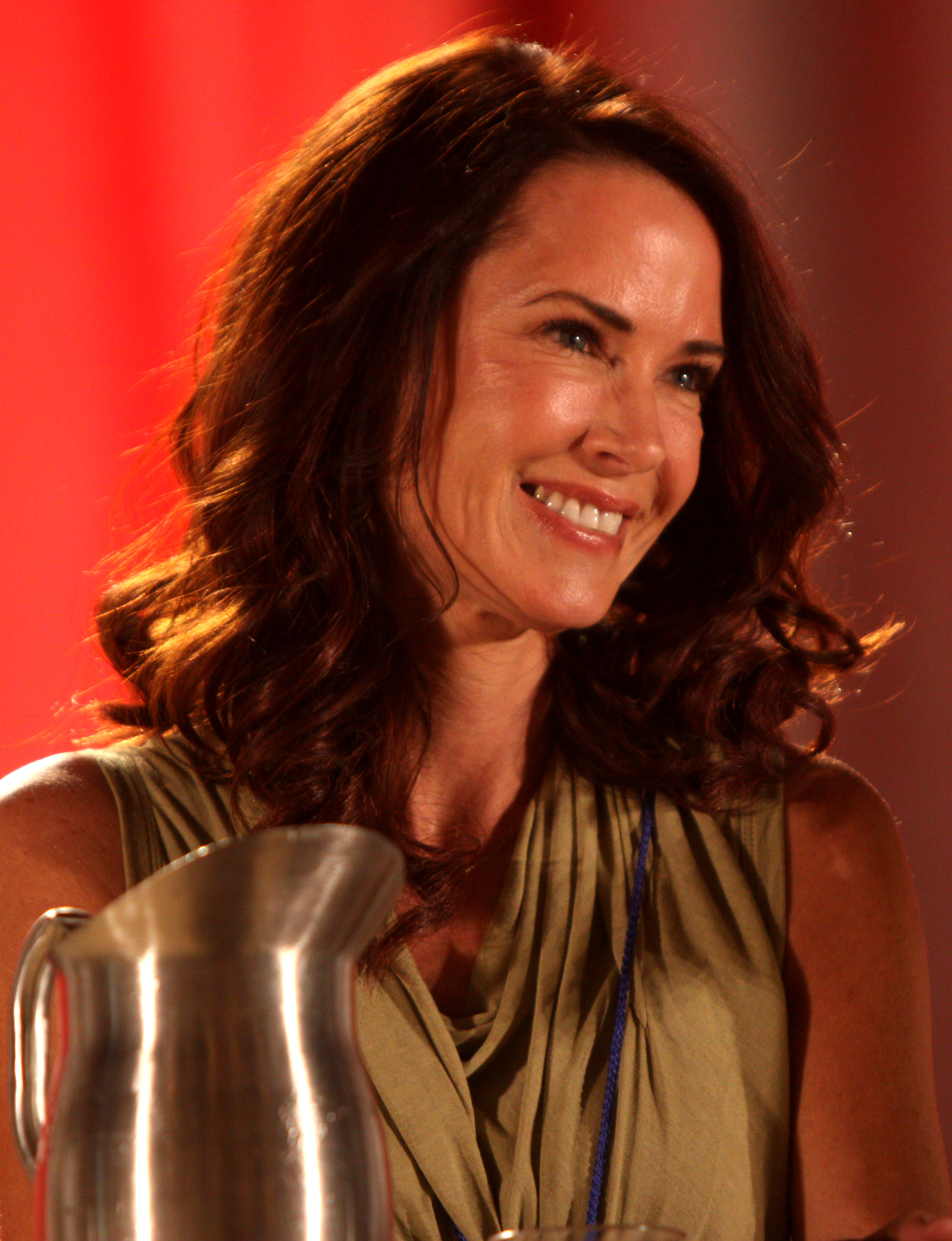
- Farentino in 2012
- Born: Deborah Mullowney; September 30, 1959 (age 66); Lucas Valley, California, U.S.
- Years active: 1982–present
- Spouses: Scott Staples (m. 1979; div. 1983) James Farentino (m. 1985; div. 1988) Tony Adams (m. 1992; div. 1994) Gregory Hoblit (m. 1994; div. 2009)
- Children: 2

Debrah Farentino (born Deborah Mullowney) is an American actress, producer, and journalist. She began her career starring in the CBS daytime soap opera Capitol from 1982 to 1987, before moving to prime time with a female leading role in the ABC comedy drama series Hooperman (1987–88).

Farentino had starring roles in a number of dramatic series in 1990s, include Equal Justice (1990–91), Earth 2 (1994–95), EZ Streets (1996–97) and Get Real (1999–2000). Her other notable credits include 1993 comedy film Son of the Pink Panther, 1999 miniseries Storm of the Century, and well as Syfy comedy-drama Eureka (2006–2012).

== Early life ==
Farentino was born Deborah Mullowney in Lucas Valley, California, and was a model before becoming an actress. She briefly attended San Jose State University before dropping out.

== Career ==
Farentino began her acting career in 1982 when she was cast in the TV series Capitol. She has since appeared in over fifty movies and TV shows, including Hooperman (1987–1989) and Son of the Pink Panther (1993). Perhaps her most famous role was as Devon Adair in NBC's SciFi series Earth 2, the first female commander depicted in a science fiction work.

Over the span of four decades, she has guest starred in many television programs, including NYPD Blue (1994), the revival of The Outer Limits (1996), JAG (2002), CSI: Miami (2003), and Hawaii Five-0 (2011). Her most recent roles include as Isabelle Matia-Paris in the ABC series Wildfire and Beverly Barlowe in the Syfy Channel series Eureka.

Farentino has produced specials for PBS/WXEL, receiving a Suncoast Emmy nomination for "Saving Americas Heroes". She has also appeared on CBS news as a special correspondent covering Guardian Angel units and has embedded multiple times with USAF Special Forces rescue units in Afghanistan.

She was chosen as one of People magazine's "50 Most Beautiful People" in 1995, while pregnant with daughter Sophie.

== Personal life ==
In 1979 she married Scott Staples. They divorced in 1983. In 1985, she married actor James Farentino, who was more than 20 years her senior. Their marriage ended in 1988.

She later married Gregory Hoblit.

== Filmography ==
=== Film ===
Year	Title	Role	Notes
1988	Cellar Dweller	Whitney Taylor	
1989	Mortal Sins	Laura Rollins	
1989	Capone Behind Bars	Jennie	
1991	Bugsy	Girl in Elevator	
1993	Son of the Pink Panther	Princess Yasmin	
1993	Malice	Nurse Tanya	
2025	A Cherry Pie Christmas	Sally Parker	

=== Television ===
Year	Title	Role	Notes
1984	T. J. Hooker	Nicole Gardner	Episode: "Model for Murder" (as Deborah Mullowney)
1982–1987	Capitol	Sloan Denning	Main cast (as Deborah Mullowney, until 1985)
1987	CBS Summer Playhouse	Dr. Kerry Langdon	Episode: "Infiltrator"
1987–1988	Hooperman	Susan Smith	Main cast
1988	She Was Marked for Murder	Claire Porter	TV film
1989	It's Garry Shandling's Show	Debrah	Episodes: "Vegas: Parts 1 & 2"
1989	The Revenge of Al Capone	Jennie	TV film
1990–1991	Equal Justice	Julie Janovich	Main cast
1991	The Whereabouts of Jenny	Liz	TV film
1992	Back to the Streets of San Francisco	Sarah Burns	TV film
1993	McBride and Groom		TV film
1993	Sherlock Holmes Returns	Amy Winslow	TV film
1994	Menendez: A Killing in Beverly Hills	Judalon Smyth	TV film
1994	XXX's & OOO's	Pam Randall	TV film
1994	Dead Air	Karen / Laura	TV film
1994	NYPD Blue	Robin Wirkus	Recurring role (Season 1)
1994–1995	Earth 2	Devon Adair	Main cast
1996	The Outer Limits	Dr. Rachel Carter	Episode: "Mind over Matter"
1996	A Mother's Instinct	Holly Mitchell	TV film
1996	Wiseguy	Emma Callendar	TV film
1996	Duckman	(voice)	Episode: "Exile in Guyville"
1996–1997	EZ Streets	Theresa Conners	Recurring role
1997	Sisters and Other Strangers	Renee Connelly	TV film
1997	Total Security	Jody Kiplinger	Recurring role
1998	The Secret Lives of Men	Jane	
1999	Storm of the Century	Molly Anderson	Miniseries
1999–2000	Get Real	Mary Green	Main cast
2001	Three Blind Mice	Josie Leeds	TV film
2001–2002	The District	Claire Debreno	Episodes: "Cop Hunt" and "Convictions"
2002	JAG	Cmdr. Amanda Waller	Episode: "The Killer"
2002	Get Real	Mary Green	Episode: "The Last Weekend"
2003	CSI: Miami	Julie Harmon	Episode: "Freaks and Tweaks"
2004	The Division	Dr. Annabel Curran Meade	Episodes: "The Box", "Crawl Space"
2005	Law & Order: Trial by Jury	Danielle Blair	Episode: "Skeleton"
2005–2006	Wildfire	Isabelle Matia-Paris	Recurring role (Season 2)
2006	Dr. Vegas		Episode: "For Love or Money"
2006–2012	Eureka	Beverly Barlowe	Recurring role
2008–2009	Eli Stone	Ellen Wethersby	Recurring role (Season 2)
2010	Saving Grace		Episode: "Loose Men in Tight Jeans"
2011	Hawaii Five-0	Elizabeth Roan	Episode: "Loa Aloha"
2011	The Closer	Beth Michaels	Episode: "Star Turn"
2014	Criminal Minds	Undersecretary Rosemary Jackson	Episode: "200"
