= Mixed Magics =

2000 collection of fantasy stories by Diana Wynne Jones

Mixed Magics: Four Tales of Chrestomanci
- First edition
- Author: Diana Wynne Jones
- Illustrator: Tim Stevens (first)
- Cover artist: Paul Slater
- Language: English
- Series: Chrestomanci
- Genre: Children's fantasy collection
- Publisher: Collins
- Publication date: May 2000
- Publication place: United Kingdom
- Media type: Print (hardcover)
- Pages: 171 pp (first edition)
- ISBN: 978-0-00-185742-1
- LC Class: PZ7.J684 Mi 2001 (US)
- Preceded by: The Lives of Christopher Chant
- Followed by: Conrad's Fate

Mixed Magics: Four Tales of Chrestomanci is a collection of four fantasy stories by the British author Diana Wynne Jones, first published by Collins in 2000. One was original to the collection, "Stealer of Souls", a novella about half of the book in length; three had been published in the 1980s. It was the fifth book published among seven Chrestomanci books (1977 to 2006) and the only collection in the series.

In the UK, the four novels that had been published at that time were reissued at the same time (May 2000) in a five-volume matching set with cover illustrations by Paul Slater that incorporate 'The Worlds of Chrestomanci' arranged in a circle.

All four stories are set during the time Eric Cat Chant (Charmed Life, The Pinhoe Egg) is a boy in the care of Christopher Chant as Chrestomanci, after the end of Charmed Life and no more than a few years after The Magicians of Caprona, if the fourth story is that late. Four of the six novels are also set during the tenure of Christopher Chant, who is Chrestomanci in five of the seven books and is often called Chrestomanci as a personal name.

== Contents ==
A two-paragraph untitled note from the author follows the title page (US edition). Among other things it gives the pronunciation guide "KREST-OH-MAN-SEE".

page	Title
9	"Warlock at the Wheel"	1984 short story
33	"Stealer of Souls"	novella original to the collection
101	"Carol Oneir's Hundredth Dream"	1986 novelette
131	"The Sage of Theare"	1982 novelette

== Warlock at the Wheel ==
"Warlock" (1984) is set soon after Charmed Life (1977), the first Chrestomanci book. The warlock of the title is the Willing Warlock, a middling one among the novel's cast of thousand villains, who all lost their magic powers in World 12A at its conclusion.

WW does not know how to earn a living without magic and tries stealing a car but soon finds himself fleeing the law on foot. He manages to steal the money to buy transfer to another world where his modest powers do operate, but one more like the real one, with greater reliance on machinery and less on magic than 12A. There he finds technology bewildering. Indeed, the car he steals is not only too complicated to learn quickly, but he mistakes its wonders for magic powers greater than his own. It has a young girl and a big dog in the back seat, too.

== Stealer of Souls ==
The original novella "Stealer of Souls" is set days or weeks after The Magicians of Caprona (1982), during Tonino Montana's visit "back to England with me, so that we [can] find out just what you can do", in Chrestomanci's words on the last page of Caprona. It is close to 20,000 words and half the collection in length.

The Castle resident Cat Chant and the younger visitor Tonino Montana — the protagonists of Charmed Life and Magicians of Caprona — visit the retired Chrestomanci Gabriel de Witt (Lives of Christopher Chant, Conrad's Fate). In old age De Witt has recently lost several remaining lives, perhaps under magical assault. The decrepit enchanter confirms the unusual nature of Tonino's magic before his penultimate life visibly departs, leaving him entirely mortal. Before resting he warns Cat (and the Chrestomanci indirectly) that he is sure of the attack and the assailant's identity: Neville Spiderman, the "most ingenious" of the evil enchanters and the last of the great ones, from the time of the first Chrestomanci about two hundred years ago.

Returning to the railway station by horse-drawn hackney, the boys are kidnapped; the trip is a long one, their intellect dulls, they are delivered to a small old man who describes them as "two apprentices from the poorhouse". His house is laden with magic and includes an evident magician's workshop they must clean. In their muddle, the boys cannot clearly identify themselves, fortunately, or recognize Master Spiderman's name.

As the hours pass, they discover that the old man has intercepted the souls of seven former Chrestomancis upon their decease and eagerly awaits that of Gabriel de Witt. Furthermore, he plans to take the soul of Eric Chant, the nine-lived boy enchanter. Incorporating nine of them will make him the most powerful of all, but he doesn't know which of the two boys is Eric Chant.

The boys alone witness the magical capture of de Witt's soul, which marks his final death in our time, but Eric's handling the lot breaks or modifies the spell, evidently, and a kind of revitalization occurs. Furthermore, at least De Witt retains great power and some capability and initiates a rush toward the present.

== Carol Oneir's Hundredth Dream ==
"Carol Oneir" (1986) is set only weeks after The Magicians of Caprona (1982) and days after "Stealer of Souls" (2002). Chrestomanci and his "family" are on vacation in the French Riviera after "Stealer"; for Chrestomanci and Tonino that is en route to Caprona following the latter's visit to England.

"Carol Oneir was the world's youngest best-selling dreamer" (the lead). From age seven her dreams had been recorded and sold, making her a very young celebrity and very rich. She is also the daughter of Christopher Chant's schoolboy friend Oneir, who appeals to the Chrestomanci for assistance when Carol stops at 99 dreams and specialists can find nothing wrong. Carol visits the Chrestomanci in the French Riviera where he and the Castle family are on vacation after "Stealer of Souls".

== The Sage of Theare ==
"The Sage" (1982) is set in unknown worlds outside Series 12, not long after Charmed Life. Eric "Cat" Chant (who barely appears) is still a boy in Chrestomanci's family.
