= The Magicians of Caprona =

1980 children's fantasy novel by Diana Wynne Jones

- First edition
- Author: Diana Wynne Jones
- Cover artist: Ionicus
- Language: English
- Series: Chrestomanci
- Genre: Children's fantasy novel
- Publisher: Macmillan
- Publication date: 1980
- Publication place: United Kingdom
- Media type: Print (hardcover)
- Pages: 223 pp
- ISBN: 978-0-333-27891-8
- Preceded by: Charmed Life
- Followed by: Witch Week

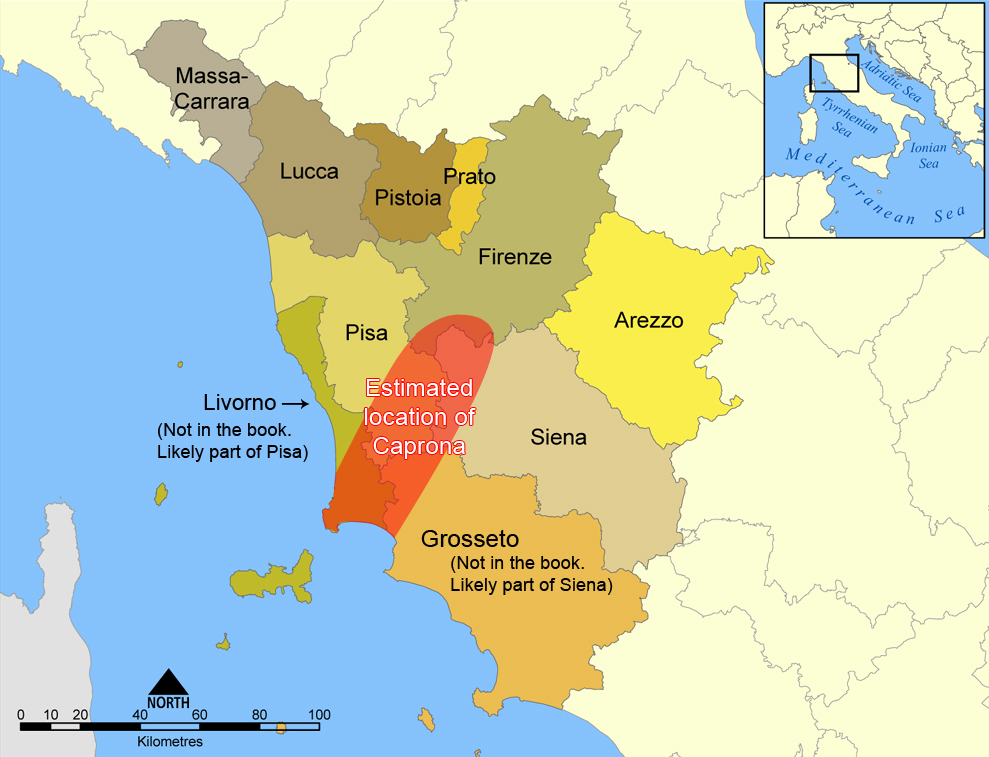
Estimated location of fictional city-state of Caprona

The Magicians of Caprona is a children's fantasy novel by British author Diana Wynne Jones published by MacMillan Children's Books in 1980. It was the second published of seven Chrestomanci books.

It features the venerable Italian family spell-houses Casa Montana and Casa Petrocchi in Caprona, a small independent city-state and duchy. (Note: Fictional Caprona is on the coast not far from the Italian Riviera, presumably south of Pisa because it borders on Pisa, Florence, and Siena exclusively and in a world that is parallel and close to ours.)

The Chrestomanci books are set in a parallel world and are collectively named for a powerful enchanter and British government office named Chrestomanci, who supervises the use of magic. The Magicians of Caprona is set during the tenure of Christopher Chant, who is Chrestomanci in five of the seven books and is often called Chrestomanci as a personal name.

== Plot summary ==
Caprona is a city-state in the Italy of Chrestomanci's world (World Twelve A), which never united as a nation-state. The houses of Casa Montana and Casa Petrocchi, both renowned for being powerful magician families, have been feuding with each other for generations. The city has begun to lose its "virtue", and the states of Florence, Siena, and Pisa intend to take advantage of this by uniting to conquer Caprona. The only way to save the city is if the true words to the Angel of Caprona, both a hymn and a powerful spell, can be found and read aloud.

The story is told through the eyes of the young Tonino Montana and his brother Paolo. They are both members of Casa Montana, one of two spell-houses in Caprona, the other being Casa Petrocchi. The two spell-houses are deadly rivals; the two families are both convinced that the decline of Caprona is all the fault of the other spell-house, and refuse to work together under any circumstances.

Tonino is, unknown to himself or the rest of Casa Montana, a talented enchanter, but he is unaware of his ability, and prefers to spend his time reading. Paolo is more outgoing and friendly, and does better at school. When representatives of both houses are called to the Duke of Caprona's palace, they both go. Whilst there, they meet members of the Petrocchi family for the first time, and they also encounter the Duchess, a powerful woman who appears to be the true ruler of Caprona.

During the book, Tonino is kidnapped and finds himself held hostage with Angelica Petrocci and whilst the two houses blame each other, Tonino and Angelica have to put their differences aside to escape. Meanwhile, Paolo teams with Renata Petrocci in order to save their lost siblings.

== Characters ==
The character of Christopher Chant (the Chrestomanci in this novel) appears as a young boy in The Lives of Christopher Chant and as a teenager in Conrad's Fate.

Antonio "Tonino" Montana
Angelica Petrocchi
Paolo Montana
Renata Petrocchi
Rosa Montana
Marco Petrocchi
Antonio Montana
Guido Petrocchi
Elizabeth Montana
Niccolo Montana
Lucia Montana
Benvenuto
Vittoria
The Duke
The Duchess
Corinna Montana
Rinaldo Montana
The Angel of Caprona

== Allusions to other works ==
The family feud between Casa Montana and Casa Petrocchi is reminiscent of the one between the Montagues and Capulets from William Shakespeare's Romeo and Juliet.

== Reception ==
Dave Langford reviewed The Magicians of Caprona for White Dwarf #44, and stated that "it features pleasantly dotty goings-on in an Italian city-state whose principal magician families are busily playing Montagues and Capulets to considerable comic effect ... Fun".

== Reviews ==
- Review by Frederick Patten (1981) in Science Fiction Review, Fall 1981
