= The Pinhoe Egg =

2006 children's fantasy novel by Diana Wynne Jones

- First edition (UK)
- Author: Diana Wynne Jones
- Illustrator: Tim Stevens
- Cover artist: Tim Stevens
- Language: English
- Series: Chrestomanci
- Genre: Children's fantasy novel
- Publisher: HarperCollins
- Publication date: September 2006
- Publication place: United Kingdom
- Media type: Print (hardcover)
- Pages: 458
- ISBN: 978-0-00-722854-6
- OCLC: 70059480
- LC Class: PZ7.J684 Pin 2006
- Preceded by: Conrad's Fate

The Pinhoe Egg is a children's fantasy novel by British author Diana Wynne Jones published by HarperCollins Children's Books in 2006. It was the last published of the seven Chrestomanci books (1977 to 2006).

It revisits Chrestomanci Castle and the character of Cat Chant from her first Chrestomanci book, but also introduces the character of Marianne Pinhoe, who lives in the village near the castle and whose family practices a rather different sort of magic from any that Chrestomanci or his charges have encountered.

The Chrestomanci books are set in a parallel world and are collectively named after a powerful enchanter and British government office named Chrestomanci, who supervises the use of magic. The Pinhoe Egg is set during the tenure of Christopher Chant, who is Chrestomanci in five of the seven books and is often called Chrestomanci as a personal name.

== Plot ==
Marianne Pinhoe's family tries to keep their magic a secret. They don't want the "Big Man", or Chrestomanci, interfering, as he tends to do when people misuse magic. Pinhoes certainly are guilty of that. Gammer, the head of the Pinhoe clan, has ostensibly gone mad, but Marianne doesn't believe that she is completely 'round the twist. She is sure that Gammer is the one sending plagues to the Farleighs, a related clan that also wishes to stay out of the sights of the "Big Man". Until recently, the Farleighs and the Pinhoes had been working together, but it seems that Gammer has started a war, and it will be hard to keep their operations under wraps for long.

Meanwhile, up at the Castle, Cat acquires a horse. He also meets the man who was bootboy at the Castle when the current Chrestomanci was a lad, Jason, and helps him and his new wife choose a house. They finally settle on Woods House, Gammer's old place, and Marianne, while showing Cat around, gives him an old egg from the attic, an egg with strong "Don't Notice" spells placed on it. This arouses the interest for "Big Man" up at the castle, something the rest of the Pinhoe clan, and Gammer in particular, doesn't want at all.

== Characters ==
Marianne Pinhoe is the main protagonist of the book. She is set to be the next Gammer of the Pinhoe clan, but that isn't what she wants at all. She has very strong magic, but, like many of Jones' characters, doesn't know it. She is an enchantress, although her mother trains her up to be a witch. She appears to have a lot of "dwimmer", a type of nature/living magic.

Joe Pinhoe is Marianne's brother who is sent to work as a bootboy (and spy) up at Chrestomanci Castle. He isn't really interested in the work, however, and mostly idles about. He is a disappointment to the family, but he would fixed it that way on purpose. He likes to fix up contraptions using magic and machinery, and he and Roger try to turn it into a lucrative business scheme.

Eric "Cat" Chant: In the first Chrestomanci book, Cat is a very lonely character, clinging to his older sister and, later, to Janet, and distrusting the adults of the Castle. In this book, he has not only grown to like and trust the people of the Castle, but he forms many new friendships, both with characters older than himself (Jason the former bootboy and his wife, Irene), and characters of his own age (Marianne). He acquires a horse Syracuse whom he has an intimate friendship with, and a griffin Klartch, although Klartch had been a mistake, hatched from an egg Marianne had given him.

Roger Chant is the son of Chrestomanci (Christopher Chant) and Millie (the Living Asheth from The Lives of Christopher Chant). He, like his sister, is quite fat. Instead of wishing for a horse, he acquired a bicycle. He makes quite good friends with Joe Pinhoe, and together create a flying machine, which they work on in secret.

Julia Chant is the daughter of Chrestomanci and Millie. She caught the horse fever from Janet, and tried to ride Syracuse, but found she couldn't deal with his temperament, so he became Cat's horse. She used to have a crush on Jason, and is upset that when she learns that he is married.

Janet Chant is the other world equivalent of Cat's sister, Gwendolen. She used to live in the normal world and got to Cat's world by the works of Gwendolen. Although she can get fiery sometimes, she is usually kind and sympathetic. Janet discovers she is one of those people afraid of horses. She, like Julia, had been infatuated with Jason, but was much more devastated than Julia when he showed up married, seeing as she had been planning to marry him in the future.

Irene is the woman who married Jason. She is described as having an "Egyptian profile, with dark hair". She, by her faithful gardener and Marianne, is called "Princess Irene". She is the kind of woman that most people end up liking, even Janet and Julia. She is a Pinhoe, and ends up buying Gammer's old house. It is strongly implied that she will become the next Gammer, seeing as she has a lot of dwimmer.

Chrestomanci: Also known as Christopher Chant, who is referred to as "The Big Man" by the Pinhoes, 'Chrestomanci' is the title of the post held by a nine-lived enchanter who keeps order in the magical realms. He is the father of Roger and Julia Chant, and guardian of Janet Chant. Cat is apprenticed to him to become the next Chrestomanci.

Millie is Chrestomanci's wife, a kind, loving woman and a powerful enchantress.

== Awards ==
The Pinhoe Egg was one of four runners up for Mythopoeic Fantasy Award, children's section, the sixth time Jones was a finalist for that annual literary award by the Mythopoeic Society.

Locus subscribers voted it number six for the 2007 Locus Award, best young adult book, voted by Locus subscribers. In 2009 it was a finalist for the Pacific Northwest Library Association Young Reader's Choice Award in the intermediate division.
