= Harry Potter influences and analogues =

Writer J. K. Rowling cites several writers as influences in her creation of her bestselling Harry Potter series. Writers, journalists and critics have noted that the books also have a number of analogues; a wide range of literature, both classical and modern, which Rowling has not openly cited as influences.

This article is divided into three sections. The first section lists those authors and books which Rowling has suggested as possible influences on Harry Potter. The second section deals with those books which Rowling has cited as favourites without mentioning possible influences. The third section deals with those analogues which Rowling has not cited either as influences or as favourites but which others have claimed bear comparison with Harry Potter. There may be additional influences, whether intentional or not, that will be found.

== Acknowledged influences ==
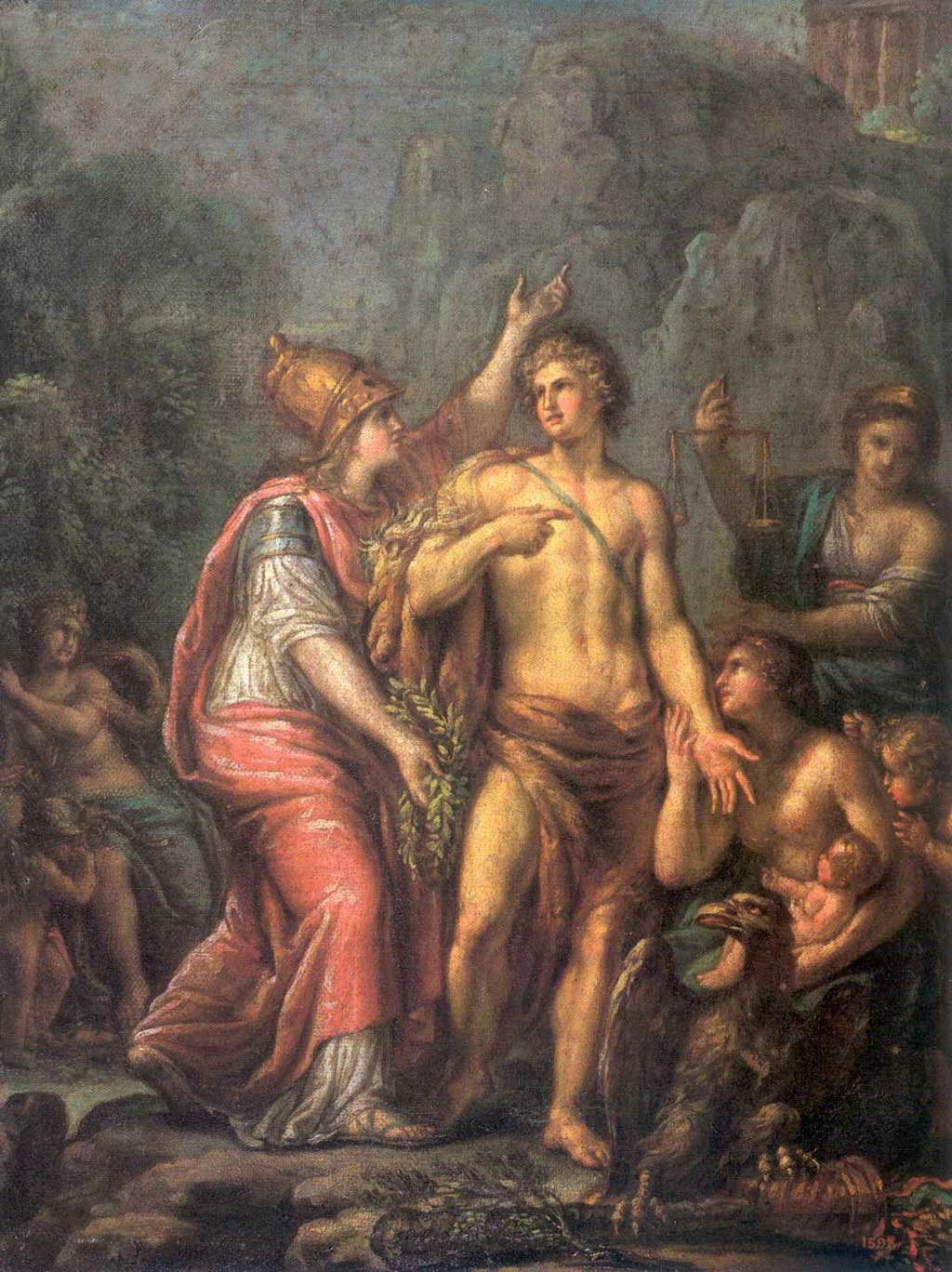
Ivan Akimov - Herakles on the crossroads. Greco-Roman mythology was a considerable influence on Harry Potter.

Rowling has never openly credited any single author with inspiration, saying, "I haven't got the faintest idea where my ideas come from, or how my imagination works. I'm just grateful that it does, because it gives me more entertainment than it gives anyone else." However, she has mentioned a number of favourite authors as probable influences in her creation of Harry Potter.

=== British folklore and mythology ===
Rowling has said, "I've taken horrible liberties with folklore and mythology, but I'm quite unashamed about that, because British folklore and British mythology is a totally bastard mythology. You know, we've been invaded by people, we've appropriated their gods, we've taken their mythical creatures, and we've soldered them all together to make, what I would say, is one of the richest folklores in the world, because it's so varied. So I feel no compunction about borrowing from that freely, but adding a few things of my own."

=== The Iliad ===
When an interviewer said that saving Cedric's body resembled the actions of Hector, Achilles, and Patroclus in the Iliad, Rowling said, "That's where it came from. That really, really, really moved me when I read that when I was 19. The idea of the desecration of a body, a very ancient idea... I was thinking of that when Harry saved Cedric's body."

=== The Bible ===
A number of commentators have drawn attention to the Biblical themes and references in J. K. Rowling's final Harry Potter novel, Harry Potter and the Deathly Hallows. In an August 2007 issue of Newsweek, Lisa Miller opined that Harry dies and then comes back to life to save humankind, like Christ. She points out the title of the chapter in which this occurs — "King's Cross" — a reference to the station on the London Underground, but also a possible allusion to Christ's cross. Also, she outlines the scene in which Harry is temporarily dead, pointing out that it places Harry in a very heaven-like setting where he talks to a father figure "whose supernatural powers are accompanied by a profound message of love." Jeffrey Weiss adds, in the Dallas Morning News, that the biblical quotation "And the last enemy that shall be destroyed is death" (1 Corinthians 15:26), featured on the tombstones of Harry's parents, refers to Christ's resurrection.

The quotation on Dumbledore's family tomb, "Where your treasure is, your heart will be also", is from Matthew 6:21, and refers to knowing which things in life are of true value. "They're very British books", Rowling revealed to an Open Book conference in October 2007, "So on a very practical note Harry was going to find biblical quotations on tombstones, [but] I think those two particular quotations he finds on the tombstones at Godric's Hollow, they (…) almost epitomize the whole series."

=== Aeschylus and William Penn ===
Deathly Hallows begins with a pair of epigraphs, one from Quaker leader William Penn's More Fruits of Solitude and one from Aeschylus' The Libation Bearers. "I really enjoyed choosing those two quotations because one is pagan, of course, and one is from a Christian tradition", Rowling said. "I'd known it was going to be those two passages since Chamber was published. I always knew [that] if I could use them at the beginning of book seven then I'd cued up the ending perfectly. If they were relevant, then I went where I needed to go. They just say it all to me, they really do."

=== The Pardoner's Tale ===
In a July 2007 webchat hosted by her publisher Bloomsbury, Rowling stated that The Pardoner's Tale of Geoffrey Chaucer's Canterbury Tales was an inspiration for a folktale, The Tale of the Three Brothers, retold by Xenophilius Lovegood in Harry Potter and the Deathly Hallows. In the tale, three brothers outwit Death by magicking a bridge to cross a dangerous river. Death, angry at being cheated, offers to give them three gifts, the Deathly Hallows, as a reward for evading him. The first two die as a result of the gifts granted to them, but the third uses his gift wisely and dies in his bed an old man. In The Pardoner's Tale, three rogues are told that if they look under a tree, they can find a means to defeat Death. Instead they find gold, and, overcome with greed, eventually kill each other to possess it.

=== Macbeth ===
Rowling has cited William Shakespeare's Macbeth as an influence. In an interview with The Leaky Cauldron and MuggleNet, when asked, "What if [Voldemort] never heard the prophecy?", she said, "It's the Macbeth idea. I absolutely adore Macbeth. It is possibly my favourite Shakespeare play. And that's the question isn't it? If Macbeth hadn't met the witches, would he have killed Duncan? Would any of it have happened? Is it fated or did he make it happen? I believe he made it happen."

On her website, she referred to Macbeth again in discussing the prophecy: "the prophecy (like the one the witches make to Macbeth, if anyone has read the play of the same name) becomes the catalyst for a situation that would never have occurred if it had not been made."

=== Emma ===
Rowling cites Jane Austen as her favourite author and a major influence. Rowling has said: "My attitude to Jane Austen is accurately summed up by that wonderful line from Cold Comfort Farm: 'One of the disadvantages of almost universal education was that all kinds of people gained a familiarity with one's favourite books. It gave one a curious feeling; like seeing a drunken stranger wrapped in one's dressing gown.'" The Harry Potter series is known for its twist endings, and Rowling has stated that, "I have never set up a surprise ending in a Harry Potter book without knowing I can never, and will never, do it anywhere near as well as Austen did in Emma."

=== The Story of the Treasure Seekers ===
Rowling frequently mentions E. Nesbit in interview, citing her "very real" child characters. In 2000, she said, "I think I identify with E Nesbit more than any other writer", and described Nesbit's The Story of the Treasure Seekers as, "Exhibit A for prohibition of all children's literature by anyone who cannot remember exactly how it felt to be a child."

=== The Wind in the Willows ===
The Wind in the Willows by Kenneth Grahame

In a 2007 reading for students in New Orleans, Rowling said that the first book to inspire her was Kenneth Grahame's children's fantasy The Wind in the Willows, read to her when she had measles at the age of 4.

=== Dorothy L. Sayers ===
Rowling has also cited the work of Christian essayist and mystery writer Dorothy L. Sayers as an influence on her work, saying "There's a theory – this applies to detective novels, and then Harry, which is not really a detective novel, but it feels like one sometimes – that you should not have romantic intrigue in a detective book. Dorothy L. Sayers, who is queen of the genre said – and then broke her own rule, but said – that there is no place for romance in a detective story except that it can be useful to camouflage other people's motives. That's true; it is a very useful trick. I've used that on Percy and I've used that to a degree on Tonks in this book, as a red herring. But having said that, I disagree in as much as mine are very character-driven books, and it's so important, therefore, that we see these characters fall in love, which is a necessary part of life."

=== The Chronicles of Narnia ===
Rowling has said she was a fan of the works of C. S. Lewis as a child, and cites the influence of his The Chronicles of Narnia on her work: "I found myself thinking about the wardrobe route to Narnia when Harry is told he has to hurl himself at a barrier in King's Cross station – it dissolves and he's on platform Nine and Three-Quarters, and there's the train for Hogwarts."

She is, however, at pains to stress the differences between Narnia and her world: "Narnia is literally a different world", she says, "whereas in the Harry books you go into a world within a world that you can see if you happen to belong. A lot of the humour comes from collisions between the magic and the everyday world. Generally there isn't much humour in the Narnia books, although I adored them when I was a child. I got so caught up I didn't think CS Lewis was especially preachy. Reading them now I find that his subliminal message isn't very subliminal." New York Times writer Charles McGrath notes the similarity between Dudley Dursley, the obnoxious son of Harry's neglectful guardians, and Eustace Scrubb, the spoiled brat who torments the main characters until converted by Aslan.

=== The Little White Horse ===
In an interview in The Scotsman in 2002, Rowling described Elizabeth Goudge's The Little White Horse as having, "perhaps more than any other book . . . a direct influence on the Harry Potter books. The author always included details of what her characters were eating and I remember liking that. You may have noticed that I always list the food being eaten at Hogwarts." Rowling said in O that "Goudge was the only [author] whose influence I was conscious of. She always described exactly what the children were eating, and I really liked knowing what they had in their sandwiches."

=== The Sword in the Stone ===
Rowling also cites the work of T. H. White, a grammar school teacher, and the author of the well-known adult classic saga, The Once and Future King, which tells the story of King Arthur of Britain, from childhood to grave. Perhaps the best-known book from this saga is The Sword in the Stone (the first book, initially intended for children, with White's own illustrations) which was made into an animated movie by Walt Disney. Arthur (called Wart) is a small scruffy-haired orphan, who meets the wizard Merlin (who has an owl, Archimedes, and acts, much like Dumbledore, in the manner of an "absent-minded professor") who takes him to a castle to educate him.

As writer Phyllis Morris notes, "The parallels between Dumbledore and Merlin do not end with the protection of the hero in danger … In addition to both characters sporting long, flowing beards (and blue eyes, according to T.H. White), Merlin was King Arthur's mentor and guide, as Dumbledore has been Harry's guide and mentor." Rowling describes Wart as "Harry's spiritual ancestor."

== Other favourites ==
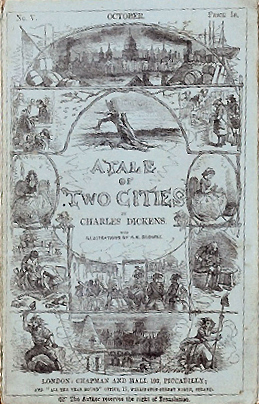
A Tale of Two Cities by Charles Dickens

In 1999, while Rowling was on a tour of the United States, a bookseller handed her a copy of I Capture the Castle by Dodie Smith, saying she would love it. The book became one of her all time favourites. Rowling says that, "it is the voice of the narrator, in this case 17-year- old Cassandra Mortmain, which makes a masterpiece out of an old plot."

Also in 1999, Rowling said in interview that she was a great fan of Grimble by Clement Freud, saying: "Grimble is one of funniest books I've ever read, and Grimble himself, who is a small boy, is a fabulous character. I'd love to see a Grimble film. As far as I know, these last two fine pieces of literature are out of print, so if any publishers ever read this, could you please dust them off and put them back in print so other people can read them?"

On a number of occasions, Rowling has cited her admiration for French novelist Colette.

Rowling said that the death of Sydney Carton in Charles Dickens's A Tale of Two Cities, and the novel's final line, "It is a far, far better thing that I do than I have ever done; it is a far, far better rest that I go to than I have ever known", had a profound impact on her.

In a 2000 interview with BBC Radio 4, Rowling revealed a deep love of Vladimir Nabokov's controversial book Lolita, saying, "There just isn't enough time to discuss how a plot that could have been the most worthless pornography becomes, in Nabokov's hands, a great and tragic love story, and I could exhaust my reservoir of superlatives trying to describe the quality of the writing."

In an interview with O: The Oprah Magazine, Rowling described Irish author Roddy Doyle as her favourite living writer, saying, "I love all his books. I often talk about him and Jane Austen in the same breath. I think people are slightly mystified by that because superficially they're such different writers. But they both have a very unsentimental approach to human nature. They can be profoundly moving without ever becoming mawkish."

Many of Rowling's named favourites decorate the links section of her personal webpage. The section is designed to look like a bookcase, and includes I Capture the Castle, The Little White Horse and Manx mouse, Jane Austen's Pride and Prejudice, Sense and Sensibility and Emma, a book of fairy tales by E. Nesbit, The Commitments and The Van by Roddy Doyle, two books by Dorothy L. Sayers and a book by Katherine Mansfield.

In January 2006, Rowling was asked by the Royal Society of Literature to nominate her top ten books every child should read. Included in her list were Wuthering Heights by Emily Brontë, Charlie and the Chocolate Factory by Roald Dahl, Robinson Crusoe by Daniel Defoe, David Copperfield by Charles Dickens, Hamlet by William Shakespeare, To Kill a Mockingbird by Harper Lee, Animal Farm by George Orwell, The Tale of Two Bad Mice by Beatrix Potter, The Catcher in the Rye by J. D. Salinger and Catch-22 by Joseph Heller.

== Analogues ==
There are a number of fictional works to which Harry Potter has been repeatedly compared in the media. Some of these Rowling has herself mentioned, others have been mentioned by Internet sites, journalists, critics or other authors. The works are listed roughly in order of creation.

=== The Pilgrim's Progress ===
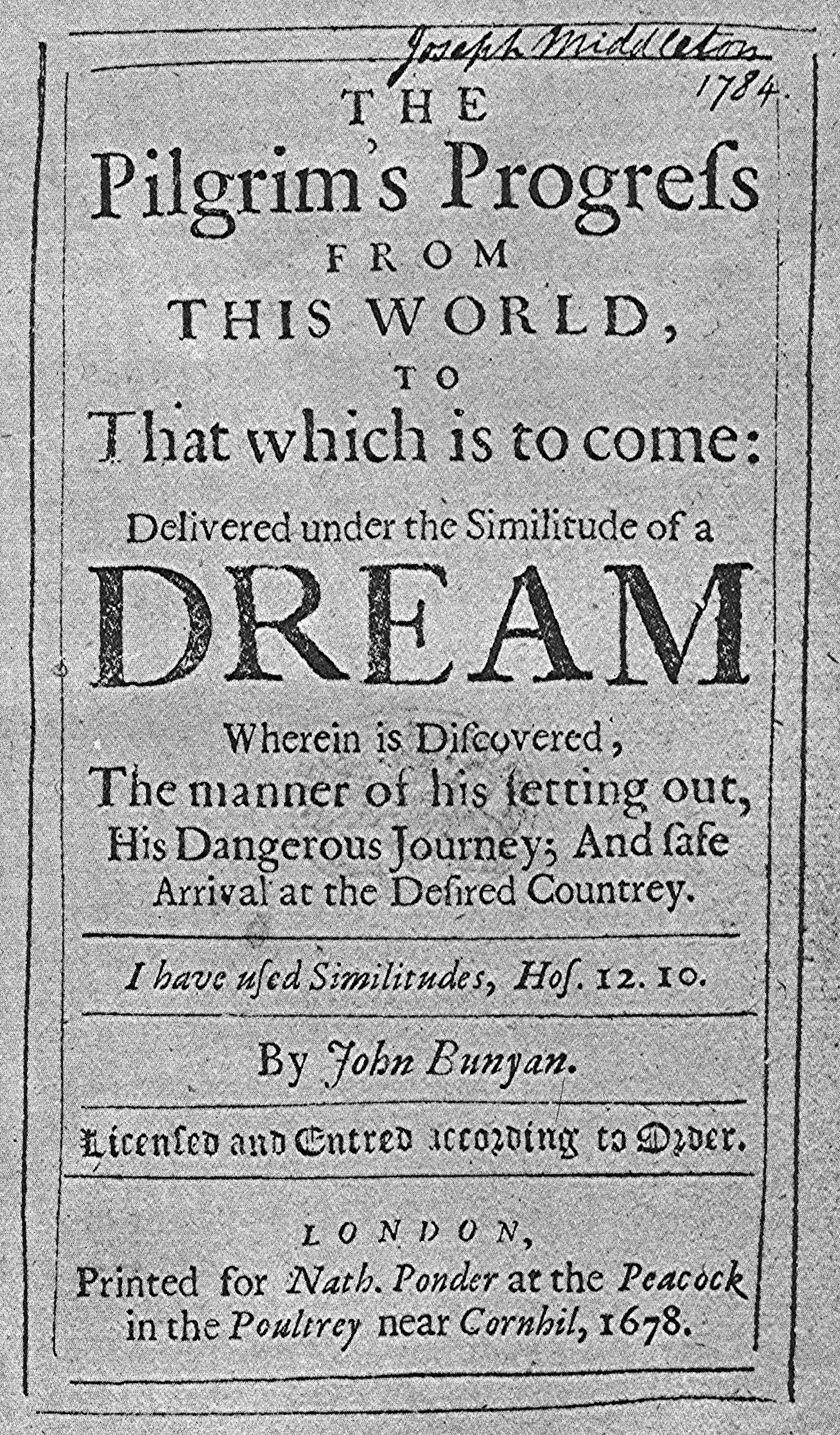
The Pilgrim's Progress by John Bunyan

John Granger sees Chamber of Secrets as similar to a morality play like John Bunyan's The Pilgrim's Progress. He describes the climax, where Harry descends to the Chamber of Secrets to rescue Ginny Weasley as "the clearest Christian allegory of salvation history since Lewis's The Lion, the Witch, and the Wardrobe. … Using only traditional symbols, from the 'Ancient of Days' figure as God the Father to the satanic serpent and Christ-like phoenix ('the Resurrection Bird'), the drama takes us from the fall to eternal life without a hitch."

=== Wuthering Heights ===
In 2006, Rowling recommended Emily Brontë's Gothic post-Romantic Wuthering Heights as number one of the top ten books every child should read. In her essay, "To Sir With Love" in the book Mapping the World of Harry Potter, Joyce Millman suggests that Severus Snape, Harry Potter's morally ambiguous potions master, is drawn from a tradition of Byronic heroes such as Wuthering Heights' Heathcliff and that chapter two of Harry Potter and the Half-Blood Prince is reminiscent of the opening of Wuthering Heights when Heathcliff is coldly introduced and asks his servant Joseph to bring up wine for him and Lockwood. Snape commands the almost identical line to his servant Wormtail, with Snape described similarly to how Emily Brontë described Heathcliff.

=== Tom Brown's Schooldays ===
The Harry Potter series draws upon a long literary tradition of stories set in boarding schools. This school story genre originated in the Victorian era with Tom Brown's Schooldays, by Thomas Hughes. Tom Brown's Schooldays laid down a basic structure which has been widely imitated, for example in Anthony Buckeridge's 1950s Jennings books.

Both Tom Brown's Schooldays and Harry Potter involve an average eleven-year-old, better at sport than academic study, who is sent to boarding school. Upon arrival, the boy gains some best friends (in Tom's case, East, in Harry's case, Ron Weasley and Hermione Granger) who helps him adjust to the new environment. They are set some arrogant bullies – in Tom Brown's case, Harry Flashman, in Harry's case Draco Malfoy. Stephen Fry, who both narrates the British audio adaptations of the Harry Potter novels and has starred in a screen adaptation of Tom Brown, has commented many times about the similarities between the two books. "Harry Potter – a boy who arrives in this strange school to board for the first time and makes good, solid friends and also enemies who use bullying and unfair tactics", notes Fry, "then is ambiguous about whether or not he is going to be good or bad. His pluck and his endeavour, loyalty, good nature and bravery are the things that carry him through – and that is the story of Tom Brown's Schooldays".

=== The Lord of the Rings ===
Fans of author J. R. R. Tolkien have drawn attention to the similarities between his novel The Lord of the Rings and the Harry Potter series; specifically Tolkien's Wormtongue and Rowling's Wormtail, Tolkien's Shelob and Rowling's Aragog, Tolkien's Gandalf and Rowling's Dumbledore, Tolkien's Nazgûl and Rowling's Dementors, Old Man Willow and the Whomping Willow and the similarities between both authors' antagonists, Tolkien's Dark Lord Sauron and Rowling's Lord Voldemort (both of whom are sometimes within their respective continuities unnamed due to intense fear surrounding their names; both often referred to as "The Dark Lord"; and both of whom are, during the time when the main action takes place, seeking to recover their lost power after having been considered dead or at least no longer a threat). Several reviews of Harry Potter and the Deathly Hallows noted that the locket used as a horcrux by Voldemort bore comparison to Tolkien's One Ring, as it negatively affects the personality of the wearer.

Rowling said she had not read The Hobbit until after she completed the first Harry Potter novel (though she had read The Lord of the Rings as a teenager) and that any similarities between her books and Tolkien's are "Fairly superficial. Tolkien created a whole new mythology, which I would never claim to have done. On the other hand, I think I have better jokes." However, Tolkien's influences included many European myths and legends, including many of the same influences as Rowling's. Tolkienian scholar Tom Shippey has maintained that "no modern writer of epic fantasy has managed to escape the mark of Tolkien, no matter how hard many of them have tried".

=== Roald Dahl's stories ===
Many have drawn attention to the similarities between Rowling's works and those of Roald Dahl, particularly in the depiction of the Dursley family, which echoes the nightmarish guardians seen in many of Dahl's books, such as the Wormwoods from Matilda, Aunt Sponge and Aunt Spiker from James and the Giant Peach, and Grandma from George's Marvellous Medicine. Rowling acknowledges that there are similarities, but believes that at a deeper level, her works are different from those of Dahl; in her words, more "moral".

=== X-Men ===
The Marvel Comics superhero team the X-Men, created by Stan Lee and Jack Kirby in 1963, are similar to Harry Potter in their examination of prejudice and intolerance. Comic book historian Michael Mallory examined the original premise of the comic, in which teenage mutants study under Professor X to learn how to control their abilities, safe from fearful Homo sapiens, and also battle less benign mutants like Magneto. He argued, "Think about [the comic] clad in traditional British university robes and pointy hats, castles and trains, and the image that springs to mind is Hogwarts School for Witchcraft and Wizard[ry], with Dumbledore, Voldemort and the class struggle between wizards and muggles." He acknowledged that while the X-Men was for the longest time "a phenomenon that was largely contained in the realm of comic book readers as opposed to the wider public [such as Rowling]", he argued "nothing exists in a vacuum, least of all popular culture. Just as the creators of X-Men consciously or unconsciously tapped into the creative ether of their time for inspiration, so has the X-Men phenomenon had an effect on the books and films that has since followed."

=== The Chronicles of Prydain ===
Lloyd Alexander's five-volume Prydain Chronicles, begun in 1964 with The Book of Three and concluding in 1968 with The High King, features a young protagonist, an assistant pig keeper named Taran, who wishes to be a great hero in a world drawn from Welsh mythology. Entertainment Weekly cited Lloyd Alexander as a possible influence on Rowling when it named her its 2007 Entertainer of the Year. When Alexander died in 2007, his obituary in New York Magazine drew many comparisons between Harry Potter and Prydain and said that "The High King is everything we desperately hope Harry Potter and the Deathly Hallows will be."

=== The Dark Is Rising ===
Susan Cooper's Dark Is Rising sequence (which commenced with Over Sea, Under Stone in 1965 and now more commonly bound in a single volume) have been compared to the Harry Potter series. The second novel, also called The Dark Is Rising, features a young boy named Will Stanton who discovers on his eleventh birthday that he is in fact imbued with magical power; in Will's case, that he is the last of the Old Ones, beings empowered by the Light to battle the Dark. The books open in much the same way, with Will finding that people are telling him strange things and that animals run from him. John Hodge, who wrote the screenplay for the film adaptation, entitled The Seeker, made substantial changes to the novel's plot and tone to differentiate it from Harry Potter.

=== A Wizard of Earthsea ===
The basic premise of Ursula K. Le Guin's A Wizard of Earthsea (Parnassus, 1968), in which a boy with unusual aptitude for magic is recognised, and sent to a special school for wizards, resembles that of Harry Potter. On his first day, Ged encounters two other students, one of whom becomes his best friend, and the other, a haughty aristocratic rival. Ged later receives a scar in his struggle with a demonic shadow which can possess people. At the beginning of his journey, he is overconfident and arrogant, but after a terrible tragedy caused by his pride, is forced to rethink his ways, and later becomes a very respected wizard and headmaster, much like Albus Dumbledore. Le Guin claimed that she did not feel Rowling "ripped her off", but that she felt that Rowling's books were overpraised for supposed originality, and that Rowling "could have been more gracious about her predecessors. My incredulity was at the critics who found the first book wonderfully original. She has many virtues, but originality isn't one of them. That hurt."

=== The Worst Witch ===
Many critics have noted that Jill Murphy's The Worst Witch series (first published in 1974 by Allison & Busby), is set in a school for girls, "Miss Cackle's Academy for Witches", reminiscent of Hogwarts. The story concerns Mildred Hubble, an awkward pupil at a boarding-school for witches, who faces a scheming, blonde and snobbish high-born rival student, and she is best friends with a know-it-all witch and a prankster witch. Her professors include a kindly and elderly headmistress and a bullying, raven-haired potions teacher. Murphy has commented on her frustration at constant comparisons between her work and Harry Potter: "It's irritating … everyone asks the same question and I even get children writing to ask me whether I mind about Hogwarts and pointing out similarities. Even worse are reviewers who come across my books, or see the TV series, and, without taking the trouble to find out that it's now over quarter of a century since I wrote my first book, make pointed remarks about 'clever timing' – or say things like 'the Worst Witch stories are not a million miles from JK Rowling's books'. The implications are really quite insulting!"

=== Star Wars ===
The Harry Potter series shares many similarities with George Lucas's Star Wars with respect to main characters, especially heroes and villains, as well as story plotlines. Scholar Deborah Cartmell states that Harry Potter's story is based as much on Star Wars as it is on any other text. The life of Harry Potter, the main hero of the series, parallels that of Luke Skywalker, who is the main hero of the Original Star Wars trilogy with both characters living dull and ordinary lives until a later age when they are recruited by an older mentor. Harry Potter trains to become a wizard at his late childhood and mentored by Albus Dumbledore in facing his destiny and enemy Lord Voldemort; whereas Luke Skywalker trains to become a Jedi at his early adulthood and is mentored by Obi-Wan Kenobi in facing his destiny and enemy Darth Vader (also known as Lord Vader). Both characters were also brought at infancy to their foster families directly by their future mentors.

The main villains of both the franchises also share many similarities. Tom Riddle was once also a student of the hero's mentor, Dumbledore at Hogwarts, also studying to be a wizard before he turned evil and transformed into Voldemort. Likewise, Anakin Skywalker was also a student of the hero's mentor, Obi-Wan Kenobi with the Jedi Order training to be a Jedi Knight before he turned to the dark side and transformed into Darth Vader.

The mentors of the main heroes also share many parallels. Both also mentored the main villain of their stories before they turned bad and betrayed their respective mentor. Both mentors were also eventually killed when fighting their former students. Albus Dumbledore was betrayed by Tom Riddle before being eventually killed by him as Lord Voldemort (through Draco Malfoy and Snape). Obi-Wan was betrayed by Anakin Skywalker before eventually being killed by him as Darth Vader. Both also voluntarily allowed themselves to be killed and advised the hero from beyond the grave.

Both stories have a "Dark Side" the followers of which are the villains of the story as well as their own followers/apprentices.

Both stories also have a prophesied "Chosen One" who will destroy evil. In the Harry Potter series, it is Harry Potter who is the chosen one who would defeat the Dark Lord Voldemort. In Star Wars, it is presumed and appears to be Luke Skywalker, but actually revealed to be Anakin Skywalker as proclaimed in the Jedi prophecy who would destroy the Sith and bring balance to the Force. He does this after being redeemed by his son, Luke Skywalker. More recent theories contrast this and argue that Luke is indeed the chosen one who will bring balance to The Force.

=== Chrestomanci series ===
In Diana Wynne Jones' Charmed Life (1977), two orphaned children receive magical education while living in a castle. The setting is a world resembling early 1900s Britain, where magic is commonplace. "Wynne Jones has been publishing for more than 30 years, and young readers have noted parallels between her books and Rowling's creations. The 1982 book Witch Week, part of Wynne Jones' celebrated Chrestomanci series, features an owlish young hero at a boarding school for children who have suffered from society's persecution of witches". Diana Wynne Jones has stated in answer to a question on her webpage: "I think Ms Rowling did get quite a few of her ideas from my books – though I have never met her, so I have never been able to ask her. My books were written many years before the Harry Potter books (Charmed Life was first published in 1977), so any similarities probably come from what she herself read as a child. Once a book is published, out in the world, it is sort of common property, for people to take ideas from and use, and I think this is what happened to my books."

=== Discworld ===
Before the arrival of J. K. Rowling, Britain's bestselling author was comic fantasy writer Terry Pratchett. His Discworld books, beginning with The Colour of Magic in 1983, satirise and parody common fantasy literature conventions. Pratchett was repeatedly asked if he "got" his idea for his magic college, the Unseen University, from Harry Potter's Hogwarts, or if the young wizard Ponder Stibbons, who has dark hair and glasses, was inspired by Harry Potter. Both in fact predate Rowling's work by several years; Pratchett jokingly claimed that he did steal them, though "I of course used a time machine."

The BBC and other British news agencies emphasised a supposed rivalry between Pratchett and Rowling, but Pratchett said on record that, while he did not put Rowling on a pedestal, he did not consider her a bad writer, nor did he envy her success. Claims of rivalry were due to a letter he wrote to The Sunday Times, about an article published declaring that fantasy "looks backward to an idealised, romanticised, pseudofeudal world, where knights and ladies morris-dance to Greensleeves". Actually, he was protesting the ineptitude of journalists in that genre, many of whom did not research their work and, in this case, contradicted themselves in the same article.

=== Ender's Game ===
Science fiction author Orson Scott Card, in a fierce editorial in response to Rowling's copyright lawsuit against the Harry Potter Lexicon, claimed that her assertion that she had had her "words stolen" was rendered moot by the fact that he could draw numerous comparisons between her books and his own 1985 novel Ender's Game; in his words,

A young kid growing up in an oppressive family situation suddenly learns that he is one of a special class of children with special abilities, who are to be educated in a remote training facility where student life is dominated by an intense game played by teams flying in midair, at which this kid turns out to be exceptionally talented and a natural leader. He trains other kids in unauthorised extra sessions, which enrages his enemies, who attack him with the intention of killing him; but he is protected by his loyal, brilliant friends and gains strength from the love of some of his family members. He is given special guidance by an older man of legendary accomplishments who previously kept the enemy at bay. He goes on to become the crucial figure in a struggle against an unseen enemy who threatens the whole world.

=== Young Sherlock Holmes ===
Chris Columbus, who directed the first two Harry Potter film adaptations, has cited the 1985 film Young Sherlock Holmes, which he wrote, as an influence in his direction for those films. "That was sort of a predecessor to this movie, in a sense", he told the BBC in 2001, "It was about two young boys and a girl in a British boarding school who had to fight a supernatural force." Scenes from Young Sherlock Holmes were subsequently used to cast the first Harry Potter film. On 3 January 2010, Irish journalist Declan Lynch (writing in The Sunday Independent) stated that "there's more than a hint of young Sherlock evident in Harry".

=== Troll ===
The 1986 Charles Band-produced low-budget horror/fantasy film Troll, directed by John Carl Buechler and starring Noah Hathaway, Julia Louis-Dreyfus and Sonny Bono, features a character named "Harry Potter Jr." In an interview with M. J. Simpson, Band claimed: "I've heard that J. K. Rowling has acknowledged that maybe she saw this low-budget movie and perhaps it inspired her." However, a spokesman for Rowling, responding to the rumors of a planned remake of the film, has denied that Rowling ever saw it before writing her book.

Rowling has said on record multiple times that the name "Harry Potter" was derived in part from a childhood friend, Ian Potter, and in part from her favourite male name, Harry. On 13 April 2008, The Mail on Sunday wrote a news article claiming that Warner Bros. had begun a legal action against Buechler; however, the story was denied and lawyers for Rowling demanded the article be removed.

On 14 April 2008, John Buechler's partner in the Troll remake, Peter Davy, said about Harry Potter, "In John's opinion, he created the first Harry Potter. J.K. Rowling says the idea just came to her. John doesn't think so. There are a lot of similarities between the theme of her books and the original Troll. John was shocked when she came out with Harry Potter."

=== Groosham Grange ===
Groosham Grange (first published in 1988), a novel by best-selling British author Anthony Horowitz, has been cited for its similarities with Harry Potter; the plot revolves around David Eliot, a teenager mistreated by his parents who receive an unexpected call from an isolated boarding school, Groosham Grange, which reveals itself as a school for wizards and witches. Both books feature a teacher who is a ghost, a werewolf character named after the Latin word for "wolf" (Lupin/Leloup (Note: "Le loup" is French for "the wolf", while "lupine" means wolf-like, both deriving from "lupus", the Latin word for wolf)), and passage to the school via railway train. Horowitz, however, while acknowledging the similarities, just thanked Rowling for her contribution to the development of the young adult fiction in the UK.

=== The Books of Magic ===
Fans of the comic book series The Books of Magic, by Neil Gaiman (first published in 1990 by DC Comics) have cited similarities to the Harry Potter story. These include a dark-haired English boy with glasses, named Timothy Hunter, who discovers his potential as the most powerful wizard of the age upon being approached by magic-wielding individuals, the first of whom makes him a gift of a pet owl. Similarities led the British tabloid paper the Daily Mirror to claim Gaiman had made accusations of plagiarism against Rowling, which he went on the record denying, saying the similarities were either coincidence, or drawn from the same fantasy archetypes. "I thought we were both just stealing from T.H. White", he said in an interview, "very straightforward." Harry Potter and Platform 9¾ even appeared in the final issues of DC's long-running Books of Magic spinoff comic. Dylan Horrocks, writer of the Books of Magic spin-off Hunter: The Age of Magic, has said they should be considered as similar works in the same genre and that both have parallels with earlier schoolboy wizards, like the 2000 AD character Luke Kirby.

=== Wizard's Hall ===
In 1991, the author Jane Yolen released a book called Wizard's Hall, to which the Harry Potter series bears a resemblance. The main protagonist, Henry (also called Thornmallow), is a young boy who joins a magical school for young wizards. At the school "he must fulfill an ancient prophecy and help overthrow a powerful, evil wizard." However, Yolen has stated that "I'm pretty sure she never read my book," attributing similarities to commonly used fantasy tropes. In an interview with the magazine Newsweek, Yolen said, "I always tell people that if Ms. Rowling would like to cut me a very large check, I would cash it." Yolen stopped reading Harry Potter after the third book, and has expressed dislike for the writing style of Harry Potter, calling it "fantasy fast food".

=== Theosophy ===
John Algeo, a scholar and member of the Theosophical Society in America, commented on Harry Potter's connection with Theosophy, noting that "Rowling has some familiarity [with Theosophy], as is clear from her reference in Harry Potter and the Prisoner of Azkaban to the fictitious author 'Cassandra Vablatsky' and her equally fictitious book Unfogging the Future. 'Vablatsky' is a metathesis of 'Blavatsky,' and 'Cassandra' is an appropriate substitute for Helena, because Cassandra was the daughter of Priam, King of Troy, a prophetess who always spoke the truth but was never believed and because Cassandra's story is part of the great war of the Iliad, fought over Helen. Moreover, the fictitious book title Unfogging the Future suggests Isis Unveiled, Helena Blavatsky's first major work."

== See also ==
- Legal disputes over the Harry Potter series

== Bibliography ==
1. Pat Pincent, "The Education of a Wizard: Harry Potter and His Predecessors" in The Ivory Tower and Harry Potter: Perspectives in a Literary Phenomenon. Edited with an Introduction by Lana A. Whited. Columbia: University of Missouri Press, 2002.
2. Amanda Craig, "Harry Potter and the art of lifting ideas", The Sunday Times, 17 July 2005.
3. Heath Paul, Helmer says he invented Harry Potter", The Hollywood News, 14 April 2008.
