= Witch Week =

1982 children's fantasy novel by Diana Wynne Jones

- First edition
- Author: Diana Wynne Jones
- Cover artist: Ionicus
- Series: Chrestomanci
- Genre: Children's fantasy novel
- Publisher: Macmillan
- Publication date: 1982
- Publication place: United Kingdom
- Media type: Print (hardcover)
- Pages: 210 pp (first edition)
- ISBN: 978-0-333-33189-7
- OCLC: 47044550
- LC Class: PZ7.J684 Wj 1982
- Preceded by: The Magicians of Caprona
- Followed by: The Lives of Christopher Chant

Witch Week is a children's fantasy novel and school story by the British writer Diana Wynne Jones, published by Macmillan Children's Books in 1982. It was the third published of seven Chrestomanci books.

Witch Week is set during the last four days of October 1981 at Larwood House, a boarding school in southern England. Many people have magical powers ("witches", male or female) but their use is a capital crime and convicted witches are burnt to death. The story begins with a teacher's discovery of an ambiguous note and dilemma whether to take it as a joke: "The note said: SOMEONE IN THIS CLASS IS A WITCH".

== Plot summary ==
Witch Week is set in an alternative modern-day Great Britain, identical to the real world except for the presence of witchcraft. Despite witches being common, witchcraft is illegal and punishable by death by burning, policed by a modern-day inquisition.

At Larwood House, a boarding school where many of the children of executed witches are sent, a note claiming "Someone in this class is a witch" is found by a teacher. This launches an internal investigation of the more unpopular students at the school (Nan Pilgrim and Charles Morgan), who are gradually coming to terms with the fact that they are witches. Mayhem gradually ensues as magic is used to make birds appear in the classroom, to rain shoes, to curse a classmate into having his words always be true, and other pranks. When the magic gets totally out of control, one of the students runs away, leaving notes that blame the witch for controlling him. The headmistress of the school calls in an Inquisitor to find the missing student and locate the source of the trouble.

Four more of the students flee the school and two seek help from an "underground railroad" system that is known to save witches by sending them to a world where they are not persecuted. Instead they are given a spell to summon unknown help and all five students converge where they are able to use it, summoning the enchanter Chrestomanci. He and the children conclude that their world diverged from 12B (ours) by a particular historical accident. They work to outwit the local inquisition and to merge their history, thus their world, with ours. It turns out that most of the schoolchildren are witches and all must lose any such powers by revising history in that way.

=== Fictional background ===
The Chrestomanci books are set in a parallel world and are collectively named after a powerful enchanter and British government office named Chrestomanci, who supervises the use of magic. Witch Week is set in the late 20th century during the tenure of Christopher Chant, who is the Chrestomanci in five of the seven books and is often called Chrestomanci as a personal name.

The Chrestomanci is unique to what it calls "World 12A", the primary setting for the series and entire setting for some stories. There are other worlds with British governments, perhaps all of series 12 or even more. The primary world is 12B, a next-door neighbour in some sense, and Witch Week is set entirely in one that is even closer to the primary one. The Chrestomanci has representatives in some worlds but does not know this one.

== Themes and influences ==
One of the major themes in the story is overcoming prejudice. Like many other books by Jones, Witch Week encourages readers to think for themselves and seek to make a positive change in the world.

=== Allusions to other works ===
Larwood House may be a reference to Lowood School from Charlotte Brontë's Jane Eyre, although in Witch Week the miserable conditions of the school are often used for comic effect.

=== Differences in editions ===
In almost every version of the book published, the class the story focuses on has a different name, according to the age group the publishers were aiming the book at the time. For instance:

- The current UK edition calls the class 3Y, which suggests they are in the third year of secondary school and therefore around thirteen.
- Another British edition, published by Collins in 2000, calls it 2Y, which suggests that they are in the second year of secondary school and therefore around twelve. This is also the name of the class in the original Macmillan publication (1982).
- The current US edition calls it 6B, which implies the children are in the sixth grade and therefore about eleven.

== Reviews and literary analysis ==
In 1991, Ruth Waterhouse, for Children's Literature Association Quarterly, wrote: "For a writer to explore with and for children sophisticated concepts such as how fiction is encoded and decoded is a bold venture. Yet encoding and decoding is an area that Diana Wynne Jones tackles with great panache and hilarious humor in Witch Week (1982). If one were to advertise the book by saying that she is drawing on theoretical concepts developed by Saussure, Foucault, and others, most readers would be discouraged, to put it mildly. In fact Wynne Jones develops the text in such a way that the concepts are conveyed through a discourse which provides great fun for young readers, while also challenging adults to rethink some of the easily ignored yet problematic aspects of fiction-writing highlighted by recent theorists: Witch Week takes up matters such as the very nature of language as it functions via the arbitrary relationship between signifiers and what they signify, and so how we (mis)read a text; and the self-reflexive nature of a novel, as it plays with our presuppositions about how a fictional world relates to the one we are stuck with, especially as regards such seemingly inflexible features as its history and geography".

Early in 1992, the science fiction writer Orson Scott Card reviewed reissues of several Diana Wynne Jones novels. He wrote concerning Witch Week:

Thus it is that underneath what seems to be rather low comedy—brooms that demand to be taken riding by witches (and hoes and rakes and mops that can be ridden, but behave more like mules and pigs than noble steeds); prankster spells at about the level of magic spitwads—there is a continuous foundation of truth. Children need powerful adult intervention to help them get control of their powers and keep their powers from taking control of them. Instead of using them for immediate self-gratification, the children instead have to create and respect certain limits to avoid destroying themselves and others. Not that anyone ever says such a thing outright. Rather the stories are that lesson, learned over and over again, yet with such humor and extravagant imagination and devastating satire that few readers will imagine that they are being civilised as they read.

In the book The Other in the School Stories: A Phenomenon in British Children's Literature (2017), Ulrike Pesold wrote that "Witch Week hardly follows the school story formula. Like Kipling, [Diana Wynne Jones] uses characteristic elements of the genre, but subverts them". Pesold also wrote that Witch Week could be seen as a reaction to Thatcherism and that this book could be read as magical realism. Pesold highlights this school story subversion by what the school lacks: an ancient school building, clear class distinctions, admiration for the Headmaster, school traditions, house and school pride. Pesold wrote: "What is more, whereas the ordinary school story shows boarding school as a safe place where children grow up, make friends and acquire skills that are seen as vital for their future lives, Larwood School is a bleak place, where the pupils are kept under surveillance, true friendship is not to be found and alterity is dangerous, even lethal". When Chrestomanci enters the story "he is too handsome, elegant and vain to be immediately recognized as the man who will save the children" and while over time the children come to trust Chrestomanci, he never occupies similar heights for the children as a character like Dumbledore does in Harry Potter.

In 2019, A. K. Larkwood, for Tor, wrote: "The casual horror of the totalitarian setting is introduced in mundane detail which disturbed me much more as an adult than when I first read it: 'bone-fires' are announced on the radio; almost all the characters' parents have been executed or imprisoned. It's an education in the banality of evil. [...] Reading again this year, I was struck by the fact that the characters of Witch Week save themselves in the end by finding help from other worlds, including one where witchcraft is practised freely. Until that point, they struggle even to articulate what they are. It's only when they learn that there is another place and another way that they're able to imagine that things could be different, and to find purpose. [...] By gaining access to another world, the children are able to make their own world anew, to undo a whole history of violence, to know themselves and be free. I'm glad that the next generation have more ways to reach these other worlds where they can see themselves; I'm also glad I had this book".

In October 2020, Witch Week was included in Vox's "One Good Thing" recommendation series. Constance Grady wrote: "Witches at a boarding school will inevitably bring Harry Potter to mind, but Witch Week predates J.K. Rowling’s series by 15 years, and it's a different kind of story entirely. It takes place somewhere grimier and sadder than Harry's glittering wizard world, and the kids are meaner. [...] Witch Week is a book for the weirdos and the oddballs — which, Jones makes clear in her triumphant denouement, includes just about everybody. That's why this book is so deeply endearing to readers of any age". Grady also highlighted that while Witch Week is the third volume in the Chrestomanci series, the book stands alone and when "Chrestomanci shows up in Witch Week, the book tells you straightforwardly everything you need to know about him. And he's there in a strictly advisory capacity to the children, who are the true main characters".

== Awards ==
Witch Week was named a School Library Journal Book of the Year.

== Adaptations ==
The novel was adapted into a BBC radio play in 2012 by Lucy Caldwell and starred former child actor Bill Milner. It also featured Alice Nokes, Joseph Samrai, Lauren Mote, Conor Doyle, Laurence Belcher, Priyanka Patel, Holly Bodimeade, Rosie Ward-Lowry and Ellie Goffe. The play was produced by Heather Larmour.

== See also ==
- School story
- Harry Potter influences and analogues
