= Controversy over the Harry Potter series =

The Harry Potter book series by J. K. Rowling has resulted in numerous controversies over its publication and content, primarily in the realms of law and religion. For further information see:

- Religious debates over the Harry Potter series
- Legal disputes over the Harry Potter series
- Politics of Harry Potter
- Harry Potter influences and analogues
