= Out of Bounds (1986 film) =

1986 film by Richard Tuggle

- Theatrical release poster
- Directed by: Richard Tuggle
- Written by: Tony Kayden
- Produced by: Charles W. Fries; Mike Rosenfeld
- Starring: Anthony Michael Hall; Jenny Wright; Jeff Kober; Glynn Turman
- Cinematography: Bruce Surtees
- Edited by: Kent Beyda
- Music by: Stewart Copeland
- Production companies: Fries Entertainment; Delphi V Productions; Fogbound Productions
- Distributed by: Columbia Pictures
- Release date: July 25, 1986
- Running time: 93 minutes
- Country: United States
- Language: English
- Budget: $9 million
- Box office: $5,099,316 (USA)

Out of Bounds is a 1986 American action crime neo-noir thriller film directed by Richard Tuggle and starring Anthony Michael Hall.

== Synopsis ==
Daryl Cage is an Iowa farm boy whose parents send him to Los Angeles to live with his brother following their divorce. At the airport, Daryl's suitcase is switched with a drug kingpin's that is full of heroin. The gangster boss kills Cage's brother and his live-in girlfriend, but Daryl is framed for the crime. He then becomes the prime suspect for the murder, but decides to clear his own name.

== Cast ==
- Anthony Michael Hall as Daryl Cage
- Jenny Wright as Dizz / Darlene
- Jeff Kober as Roy Gaddis
- Glynn Turman as Lieutenant Delgado
- Raymond J. Barry as Hurley
- Pepe Serna as Murano
- Michele Little as Crystal
- Jerry Levine as Marshall
- Ji-Tu Cumbuka as Lemar
- Kevin McCorkle as Tommy Cage
- Linda Shayne as Chris Cage
- Maggie Gwinn as Mrs. Cage
- Ted Gehring as Mr. Cage
- Meat Loaf as Gil (as Meatloaf)
- Allan Graf as Biker
- Dan Lewk as Cop On Melrose
- John Vickery as Detective #1
- Tony Acierto as Detective #2
- David Chung as Detective #3
- Tony Kayden as Snide Patron #1
- John Tarnoff as Snide Patron #2
- Jennifer Balgobin as Martha

== Production ==
=== Development ===
The film was the idea of executive producer John Tarnoff, who wanted to make a "fish out of water" tale set in the Los Angeles club scene. He hired TV writer Tony Kayden to a script.

"I really wanted to capture the L.A. underground scene-where the runaways come, where the real low-lifes go and where the clubs come and go very fast," said Kayden. "I was always a fan of the punk scene and all the bands, like Suicidal Tendencies, the Gun Club and Tex and the Horseheads. A lot of the kids in the film are loosely based on characters I'd see hanging out around town. There's a very strange, transient sub-culture here made up of kids that come to L.A. for one thing and end up going in a totally different direction."

The film was directed by Richard Tuggle, who was best known for having written two Clint Eastwood films, Escape from Alcatraz and Tightrope (Tuggle also directed Tightrope). Tuggle worked on the script with Kayden, changing the hero from a Westchester, N.Y., kid interested in heavy metal to an Iowa farm boy. Tuggle felt that this would give a greater contrast between the hero and the world he fell in to.

"There's no question in my mind that writing is more creative than directing," he says. "A writer is battling himself to make his stuff better. A director is battling the studio, which is trying to spend less; the weather; mechanical problems on the set and other people's creative feelings, not to mention the crazy hours. He ends up spending no more than 20 per cent of his time on artistic decisions. It's exhausting."

Tuggle said the film was "a combination of two genres that I've always been attracted to. One is the fish-out- of-water genre... The other part is basically the innocent person in jeopardy, the Hitchcockian person-on-the-run kind of suspense."

=== Casting ===
The lead role was given to Anthony Michael Hall, who had recently achieved fame in starring roles as a "geek" character in a number of 1980s teen movies, such as Sixteen Candles and was grouped in with The Brat Pack. Hall said "The so-called Brat Pack is an invention of some journalist and I don't consider those people my peer group. I don't like being lumped in with a group of people... I have my own thing to say."

Hall made the film after Weird Science, and Out of Bounds was his first non comedy. "I hope it puts an entirely different slant on my career," he said. (At this stage he was also developing a script based on The Basketball Diaries and a biopic of a bantamweight boxer. He had also come close to starring in Full Metal Jacket.)

Tuggle said Hall was "kind of grown up now; he's taller and bigger, and he has a vulnerable side to him that will appeal to the audience."

=== Filming ===
Filming started December 1985. Tuggle said, "My hardest decision on the movie had to do with suspense. A comedy director has to choose between actually showing a man slip on a banana peel or concentrating on the anticipation, the knowledge that he's going to slip on it. The same thing happens in suspense."

The film featured a cameo from Siouxsie and the Banshees. Siouxsie said, "We all appear in this club scene they're busy shooting at the moment, but they flew us over especially to do it, which is nice...We read the script and really liked it and then thought, 'Yeah, why not do it?' It's basically a cops 'n robbers type thriller, and quite upbeat --the good guy gets the bad guy, and we're featured in a club scene playing one of our songs, 'Cities in Dust.' At least they're just letting us be ourselves, which makes quite a change from the usual offers."

Tuggle and Hall clashed during filming. The director says the movie "was the story of an innocent farm boy who unknowingly stumbles into a drug deal. When Michael took the part, I thought he understood the sort of character he was meant to play because the script made it clear. When we started shooting, I was stunned to discover he intended to play it like a Clint Eastwood tough guy."

When Gov. George Deukmejian visited the set, Hall refused to make an appearance as long as any news teams were on hand. Later that day, when Hall saw a video crew, hired by Columbia to document some behind-the-scenes action, filming a discussion he was having with Tuggle, he was reportedly uncomfortable and unhappy and requested the crew kept away. Several days later, when an Entertainment Tonight unit arrived, he insisted they leave the set, even though they weren't scheduled to interview him.

Reportedly the crew frequently referred to Hall as either “the Brat” or “Anthony Michael Moron.” When he was filming a scene in which he hit his adversary in the face with a beer bottle, Hall came over to the camera, looking through the lens as the stunt coordinator demonstrated the proper throwing motion. Eyeing the young actor with obvious distaste, one crew member grumbled: “Gee, I wonder if he learned to do that in a movie magazine.”

"There's something about Michael that makes you like him and want to hug him," Tuggle said "but for some reason he seems bent on destroying that part of himself. People respond to his innocence, but he wants to be a cool leading man... It was hard to discuss things rationally with him," recalls Tuggle. “For instance, there was a scene where he was acting in a cocky manner and I told him, ‘Look, you’re supposedly alone in this town and you’re scared--I need to see some of those emotions.’ He replied, ‘I don’t think in terms of emotions, I think in terms of colors.’ At that point I realized I was in big trouble. I considered advising him to play it ‘tangerine,’ but at 3 in the morning with a crew waiting to go home I figured to hell with it, just start shooting film.”

The film performed poorly at the box office, and Hall's appearances on Saturday Night Live were not well received. Hall talks about that period of his life with considerable regret.

"Young actors tend to be more emotional than veteran ones," said Tuggle. "The positive side of that is that they're really giving a lot. The negative is that they often get carried away with their emotions. But when Michael's really cooking, it can be exciting. I almost don't want to calm him down, because you lose a lot of the energy of the performance."

== Soundtrack ==
The film's soundtrack featured songs by Stewart Copeland & Adam Ant, Robert Berry, Night Ranger, Belinda Carlisle, The Smiths, The Cult, The Lords of the New Church, Sammy Hagar, and Siouxsie and the Banshees. The Night Ranger song "Wild & Innocent Youth" has never appeared on any of the band's albums to date.

According to the DVD accompanying the box set for 100,000,000 Bon Jovi Fans Can't Be Wrong, the Bon Jovi song "Out of Bounds" was written as the title song from the movie, but it did not make it. Y&T's "Wild If I Wanna" appears in a short sequence in the film, but did not make the soundtrack. It eventually appeared on the band's 2003 release Unearthed, Vol. 1 and made the group's setlists around that time due to popular demand.

In the 1999 reissue of the Girls, Girls, Girls album, Mötley Crüe bassist Nikki Sixx claimed that the instrumental track "Nona" was originally commissioned for this film.

== Reception ==
The film received mixed-to-negative reviews upon release.

Roger Ebert of the Chicago Sun-Times gave it 2 out of 4, and said "Out of Bounds plays like an explosion at the cliche factory." Caryn James of The New York Times wrote that the "film wants to be a realistic thriller, but it merely acts out kids' fantasies of heroism and adventure, with drugs and rock music thrown in for a contemporary twist."

== Home video ==
The film was released on VHS and laserdisc by RCA/Columbia Pictures Home Video in 1986, and remains unavailable on DVD or Blu-ray.

== See also ==
- List of American films of 1986
