= Troll (1986 film) =

1986 American comedy horror film

- Theatrical release poster
- Directed by: John Carl Buechler
- Written by: Ed Naha and Oliver Gonzalez
- Story by: Joanna Granillo (uncredited)
- Produced by: Albert Band
- Starring: Noah Hathaway; Michael Moriarty; Shelley Hack; Jenny Beck; Sonny Bono; Phil Fondacaro; Anne Lockhart; Julia Louis-Dreyfus; Gary Sandy; June Lockhart
- Cinematography: Romano Albani
- Edited by: Lee Percy
- Music by: Richard Band
- Distributed by: Empire Pictures
- Release date: January 17, 1986
- Running time: 82 minutes
- Country: United States
- Language: English
- Budget: $2.5 million
- Box office: $5.5 million

Troll is a 1986 American dark fantasy comedy film directed by John Carl Buechler and produced by Charles Band of Empire Pictures, starring Noah Hathaway, Michael Moriarty, Shelley Hack, Jenny Beck, Sonny Bono, Phil Fondacaro, Anne Lockhart, Julia Louis-Dreyfus (in her film debut), Gary Sandy and June Lockhart. It is the first installment of the Troll film series.

== Plot ==
The Potter family – Harry Potter Sr. and Anne Potter with 14-year-old son Harry Jr. and 10-year-old daughter Wendy Potter – move into a new apartment complex in San Francisco. While unpacking, Wendy is attacked by a grotesque little creature wielding a magic ring. The troll captures Wendy and takes on her appearance. After meeting the other eccentric tenants, the family notices Wendy's unusual and aggressive behavior, but they attribute her behavior to the stress of the move. The troll goes from apartment to apartment transforming the tenants into lush forests and spawning fairy tale creatures (such as goblins, nymphs and elves).

Concerned by his sister's behavior, Harry Jr. seeks solace in the company of a mysterious older woman named Eunice St. Clair, who reveals herself to be a witch. Long ago, she and a powerful wizard named Torok were in love. At that time, the world was divided between fairies and humans. The realms were equal and independent of each other; however, Torok and some of the fairies challenged this balance, resulting in a great war in which the humans prevailed. Torok was mutated into a troll as punishment.

Torok seeks to regain his power, destroy humanity and recreate the fairy tale world in which he had once lived. As Torok requires a princess, he is keeping Wendy alive. Eunice and Harry Jr. discover that all the apartments have been transformed into a part of the magical world. Eunice gives Harry Jr. a magic spear capable of killing the largest and most vicious creature in this world. Eunice is attacked by Torok and mutated into a tree stump, and Harry finds his sister trapped in a coffin of glass. Harry Jr. saves Wendy, but loses the magic spear when Torok's great batlike monster attacks.

Before the monster can kill Harry Jr. and Wendy, Torok kills it himself to spare Wendy, destroying his carefully constructed fairy realm. As the magic world collapses around them, Harry Jr. and his family are given a chance to escape, leaving just as the police arrive. Eunice is restored to normal as well as she bids Harry farewell and departs. As the police investigate the house, one of them is drawn into a remaining fragment of the alternate fairy world. Torok's arm rises into view, preparing to use his ring on the police officer.

== Cast ==
- Noah Hathaway as Harry Potter Jr.
- Michael Moriarty as Harry Potter Sr.
- Shelley Hack as Anne Potter
- Jenny Beck as Wendy Anne Potter
- Sonny Bono as Peter Dickinson
- Phil Fondacaro as Malcolm Malory and Torok the Troll
- Brad Hall as William Daniels
- June Lockhart as Eunice St. Clair
  - Anne Lockhart as Young Eunice St. Clair
- Julia Louis-Dreyfus as Jeanette Cooper
- Gary Sandy as Barry Tabor
- Frank Welker as the voice of Torok the Troll and various Troll voices

== Production ==
John Carl Buechler first conceived of the initial concept for Troll while working at Roger Corman's New World Pictures on Android. After Empire International Pictures head Charles Band was impressed with Buechler's effects work on Ghoulies, Band offered Buechler the opportunity to direct Buechler showed Band his concept for Troll. Band approved the idea on the condition the film play to a more broad PG-13 audience rather than an R-rated one which meant Buechler had to rework the concept which was more aligned with a slasher film like Friday the 13th with the troll murdering the cast one-by-one. As a workaround, Buechler came up with the idea of the troll transforming the cast into plant-like creations through usage of its magic from which entire environments would emerge. Initially Buechler had intended to write the film himself, but as he was splitting his time between directing Troll and assisting on prepping the make-up effects for other Empire productions like Zone Troopers and Eliminators, Buechler enlisted Ed Naha to work on the script with him. Buechler tailored the script specifically for dwarf actor Phil Fondacaro referring to him as "the best performer I've ever worked with" with Fondacaro portraying a dual role as not only the titular troll, Turok, but also one of the lead characters.

The film was shot back to back with Empire Pictures' TerrorVision in Italy, at the Stabilimenti Cinematografici Pontini studios near Rome. Many of the same crew worked on both productions, including Buechler as creature effects designer, Romano Albani as cinematographer, and Richard Band as composer. The two films were released a month apart from each other in the United States.

== Release ==
=== Box office ===
The estimated budget for Troll was between $700,000 and $1.1 million. Troll opened in the U.S. on January 17, 1986, on 959 screens, earning $2,595,054 that weekend, and placing ninth on the box office charts.

=== Critical response ===
On Rotten Tomatoes, the film has an approval rating of 27% based on 11 reviews. On Metacritic the film has a weighted average score of 30 out of 100, based on 5 critics, indicating "generally unfavorable reviews".

Janet Maslin of The New York Times wrote: "Troll has a knowing tone that's more smart-alecky than clever. And it hovers uncomfortably between comedy and horror, without ever landing decisively in either camp." Variety gave the film a mixed review and called it a "predictable, dim-witted premise executed for the most part with surprising style". Patrick Goldstein of the Los Angeles Times described it as "a clunky, poorly executed shocker".

== Accolades ==
In 1986, Beck was nominated in the 8th Youth in Film Association, for Exceptional Performance by a Young Actress.

== Legacy ==
Troll's plot has no relation to the film Troll 2 or the two Troll 3 films, which are intended to be more horror than fantasy. Its first "sequel", Troll 2, produced under the title Goblins, is considered one of the worst films of all time, and was retitled Troll 2 to cash in on the success of the original. Over time, it has developed a cult following.

The films Creepers (also known as Contamination .7 or The Crawlers) and Quest for the Mighty Sword (also known as Ator IV, Ator III: The Hobgoblin, or Hobgoblins) both adopted the name Troll 3 at some point as an alternate title, despite neither having a plot relation to the two previous Troll films, with the exception that the Hobgoblin in Quest does resemble the Goblins in Troll 2.

In August 2011, rumors circulated of another sequel. In July 2015, plans for a prequel were reported, titled Troll: The Rise of Harry Potter Jr., along with an animated series. The film, starring Patricia Arquette and Baxter Bartlett, was supposed to be released in 2017, with the animated series broadcast in 2018.

== Proposed remake ==
In the mid-2000s, plans were announced for a remake with Buechler again directing. Script samples were made available online, with actors encouraged to film auditions and submit them. In 2009, Uriah Shelton was attached to play Harry Potter Jr., and Noah Hathaway was set to make an appearance as a human Torok. Trouble with financing, largely because of legal issues involving the use of the name "Harry Potter", led to long delays, and Buechler's cancer diagnosis ultimately led to the project being cancelled.

== Home media ==
Troll was released on a double feature DVD with Troll 2 by MGM on August 26, 2003. Scream Factory released a double feature Blu-ray of Troll and Troll 2 on November 17, 2015. The first 5,000 copies included a DVD of Best Worst Movie, the documentary about the production and legacy of Troll 2.

== Similarity to Harry Potter ==
Since the release of the Harry Potter books starting in 1997, some of those involved in the film have accused J. K. Rowling of plagiarizing elements from Troll. Producer Charles Band stated in an interview that "there are certain scenes in Troll, not to mention the name of the main character, which predate the Harry Potter books by many years." In 2008, John Buechler's partner in the Troll remake, Peter Davy, said about Harry Potter: "In John's opinion, he created the first Harry Potter. J. K. Rowling says the idea just came to her. John doesn't think so."
