= Chrestomanci =

Series of fantasy novels

Chrestomanci (The Worlds of Chrestomanci)
- Charmed Life (1977); The Magicians of Caprona (1980); Witch Week (1982); The Lives of Christopher Chant (1988); Mixed Magics: Four Tales of Chrestomanci (2000); Conrad's Fate (2005); The Pinhoe Egg (2006)
- Author: Diana Wynne Jones
- Cover artist: various
- Country: United Kingdom
- Language: English
- Genre: Children's fantasy
- Publisher: various (first); Greenwillow Books (US)
- Published: 1977–2006
- Media type: Print
- No. of books: 7

Chrestomanci, sometimes branded The Worlds of Chrestomanci, is a heptalogy of children's fantasy books written by British author Diana Wynne Jones, published from 1977 to 2006. In the context of the parallel universe setting of the books, Chrestomanci refers to both the British government office that is responsible for supervising the use of magic and Chrestomanci Castle in southern England, which is both residence and headquarters.

Jones gives the pronunciation "KREST–OH–MAN–SEE" herself and one of her characters writes the same instruction for using the word as a spell.

== The Worlds ==
The series takes place in a multiverse setting called the Related Worlds. The worlds have branched from common ancestors at important events in history such as English and French victories in the Battle of Agincourt, or the success or failure of the Gunpowder Plot. A few people can move between worlds, at least non-materially. It is common for people to have parallel selves in other worlds. The principal setting for the series is World 12A.

World 12A is reminiscent of Britain during the Edwardian era. There are known to be other worlds with British governments, probably all of series 12 and some others; even more worlds have an England in or near Europe. The Chrestomanci has representatives in some other worlds but does not know all other worlds. Indeed, Witch Week is set in a world even closer to the real one. Its existence is a surprise to Chrestomanci Christopher Chant and he cannot easily identify it.

=== Magic ===
In World 12A, "magic is as common as music is with us", Jones explains. While that is the norm, a world where everyone has detectable magic is rare or unique to the story of Witch Week.

Ordinary English language of the series distinguishes "enchanters" from sorcerers from witches, etc., partly by the degree or greatness of their magic.

As a class, enchanters have the most magic and are rare. They may have as many as nine lives; those with nine lives have the most magic and are few in number. Nine-lived enchanters known as the Chrestomanci are unique across all the Related Worlds: i.e., they have no alternate selves.

One crucial sort of magic is the capability to travel between worlds with some knowledge and control, at least in spirit. The fact that spirit-travel in the Related Worlds explains some experiences of ordinary people, is not directly addressed.

== Books ==
There are seven Chrestomanci books: six novels and a collection of four stories subtitled Four Tales of Chrestomanci.

The main setting for the series is Chrestomanci Castle in southern England, in an unspecified time, in a parallel world close to ours where "magic is as common as music is with us". Two of the novels are set during the childhood and during the adolescence of Christopher Chant.

- The Lives of Christopher Chant (1988)
- Conrad's Fate (2005)

Christopher is mainly about 12 years old in the first novel, which was later issued with the subtitle The Childhood of Chrestomanci. He is 15 years old in the second novel. The other four novels and all four tales are set during his tenure as Chrestomanci, and at least 25 years pass between The Lives and Charmed Life.

- Charmed Life (1977)
- "Warlock at the Wheel" (1984 short story)
- The Magicians of Caprona (1980)
- "Stealer of Souls" (2000 novella)
- "Carol Oneir's Hundredth Dream" (1986 novelette)
- The Pinhoe Egg (2006)

One novel and one tale cannot be placed in sequence. They are set in other worlds without overlapping characters except visits by Christopher Chant as Chrestomanci and evidently in the prime of his life.

- "The Sage of Theare" (1982 novelette)
- Witch Week (1982 novel)

Eric Chant appears briefly in "The Sage of Theare" as a boy or young adult from the household of Chrestomanci Christopher Chant.

All four short fictions named here are collected in Mixed Magics.

=== Editions ===
UK 2000 set of five #1–5 (reissue of four with first #5) branded "The Worlds of Chrestomanci" by Paul Slater cover illustrations.

US 1997 to 1999 hardcover with Greg Newbold cover illustrations with "A Chrestomanci Book" along bottom edge

US 2000–12 omnibus #1–4 The Chrestomanci Quartet Ch Quartet 2000–12 US

US 2001 paperbacks with top banner "A Chrestomanci Novel" and Newbold illustrations without stone arch framework of the hardcover eds.

US Chronicles of Chrestomanci, three volumes:

- I (Charmed Life, Lives of CC)
- II (Magicians of Caprona, Witch Week), January 2001
- III (Conrad's Fate, Pinhoe Egg)

==== Cover art ====
- (first) Ionicus #1–3, Paul Slater #5,
- Greg Newbold #1–5, 1997 to 2001
- Paul Slater #1–5, 2000
- Larry R (2005?)

==== Illustrations ====
The recent editions of the books have been illustrated by Tim Stevens, who also illustrated Jones' Howl's Moving Castle series. Illustrations are usually at the start of one of the books' chapters.

=== Awards ===
The books did not win major awards in the speculative fiction field.

- Charmed Life —

The novel won the Guardian Children's Fiction Prize in 1978 and was a Commended runner-up for the 1977 Carnegie Medal. It also won the German Preis der Leseratten.

- Witch Week —

Witch Week was named a School Library Journal Book of the Year.

- The Lives of Christopher Chant—

The Lives was a Commended runner-up for the 1988 Carnegie Medal.
An ALA Notable Book [back cover of Beech Tree Books, 1998] [10 UP / RL 4.9] [also quoting ALA Booklist and The Horn Book, two starred reviews]

- Conrad's Fate —

Seventh rank for the annual Locus Award, young adult book.

- The Pinhoe Egg —

The Pinhoe Egg was one of four runners up for Mythopoeic Fantasy Award, children's section, the sixth time Jones was a finalist for that annual literary award by the Mythopoeic Society. Locus subscribers voted it number six for the 2007 Locus Award for best young adult book. In 2009 it was a finalist for the Pacific Northwest Library Association Young Reader's Choice Awards in the intermediate division.

== The office of Chrestomanci ==
=== Abilities ===
All Chrestomancis must have, or have had, nine lives. Merely calling out "Chrestomanci" will cause the current Chrestomanci to appear, whether he wants to or not, anywhere on his own world. It is implied in Witch Week that saying his name three times will summon him on any world. Once called, a Chrestomanci will attempt to solve any urgent magical dilemma, either out of obligation or natural inclination.

As enchanters, Chrestomancis are among the strongest magic-users in their world. The two featured Chrestomanci in the series have serious magical weaknesses. Whether this is a result of their magical strength or simply coincidence is unknown. In Christopher Chant's case, this weakness is silver: he cannot work magic while silver is on his person or while being touched by silver. He is also unable to work magic directly on silver. Eric "Cat" Chant's weakness is that he can only do magic with his left hand.

The seat of office is Chrestomanci Castle, a fortress of magic staffed by civil servants and occupied by the current enchanter and his family. This castle can be used as both a government office and a private dwelling, as well as a school for Chrestomanci's children and wards. Most people find the atmosphere of the castle disconcerting, but Chrestomanci does not seem to notice.

=== Known Chrestomancis ===
Benjamin Allworthy is the earliest named Chrestomanci, followed by Gabriel de Witt and his successor, Christopher Chant.

Gabriel de Witt appears in The Lives of Christopher Chant, Conrad's Fate, and Stealer of Souls. Christopher Chant became Chrestomanci after Gabriel retired.

Christopher Chant appears in all of the books in the Chrestomanci series. He is the current occupant of the post. He takes great pains with his clothes, and is often found in either his impeccable dove-gray suit or one of many elaborately embroidered dressing gowns. He is often described as dreamy or vague, but these are also the times when he is most perceptive. He currently has two lives remaining, one of which is in the gold wedding ring worn by his wife, Millie.

Eric "Cat" Chant appears in Charmed Life, Mixed Magics, and The Pinhoe Egg. He is in training to become the next Chrestomanci. He is a seemingly ordinary boy, with interests similar to most boys his age. Cat currently has three lives remaining, one of which is in a cat named Fiddle that his sister Gwendolen transformed from his violin early in their childhoods. Gwendolen also imprisoned Cat's lives into a matchbook, killing one of his lives in the process, and it is revealed near the end of Charmed Life that she was somehow using Cat's magic, and destroying three of his lost lives, to do her nefarious works. Cat's two other lives were lost when he nearly died in childbirth, and when he drowned during the Saucy Nancy disaster – the sinking of a leisure boat at the beginning of Charmed Life that killed Cat and Gwendolen's parents.
