= Conrad's Fate =

2005 children's fantasy novel by Diana Wynne Jones

- First UK edition
- Author: Diana Wynne Jones
- Illustrator: Tim Stevens
- Language: English
- Series: Chrestomanci
- Genre: Children's fantasy novel
- Publisher: Collins
- Publication date: March 2005
- Publication place: United Kingdom
- Media type: Print (hardcover)
- Pages: 393 (first edition)
- ISBN: 978-0-00-719085-0
- OCLC: 57199954
- Preceded by: Mixed Magics
- Followed by: The Pinhoe Egg

Conrad's Fate is a children's fantasy novel by British author Diana Wynne Jones published by Collins in 2005. It was the sixth published of the seven Chrestomanci books (1977 to 2006).

Conrad is the protagonist, a twelve-year-old boy sent to work at the local castle ("Stallery"), with a magical mission to kill someone who is neither named nor described. Fifteen-year-old Christopher Chant (The Lives of Christopher Chant) applies for work at the same time on a personal mission. They are both hired.

The Chrestomanci books are set in a parallel world and are collectively named after a powerful enchanter and British government office called "the Chrestomanci", who supervises the use of magic and is responsible for supervising all use of magic in the Related Worlds (worlds that speak English). Conrad's Fate is set during the adolescence of Christopher Chant, who is Chrestomanci in five of the other books in the series.

== Plot summary ==
Conrad Tesdinic lives in Stallchester, a small town in the English Alps, a mountain range present in Series Seven worlds where the British Isles are still connected to the European mainland. Conrad's father is dead; his sister Anthea has left home to go to university; and his mother, Franconia, is an eccentric feminist author whose books are sold exclusively in her brother's bookshop. She and Conrad live with her brother, Uncle Alfred, over the bookshop.

In the mountains high above Stallchester lies Stallery Mansion, home to the Count and his family. Uncle Alfred tells Conrad that someone up at Stallery Mansion is "pulling the possibilities" – that is, shifting the parameters of the world just a little, in order to benefit themselves to the detriment of the rest of the world. This is later referred to as a "probability shift". From the affluence of Stallery, it is obvious that this person is making a great deal of money by doing so. In the town, only small details change – the colour of the postboxes, the titles of books – but Uncle Alfred is certain that someone at Stallery is reaping far greater benefits from the shifts. Uncle Alfred and his Magician's Circle tell Conrad that he is going to die within the year unless he kills the person pulling the possibilities. This person (unnamed by any) is apparently someone Conrad should have eliminated in a past life. To kill this person and set things right, Conrad will need to infiltrate Stallery Mansion in the guise of a domestic servant, and then summon a Walker. The Walkers are magical beings who come on command and give the caller what they need for their particular situation. Conrad is told that the Walker will give him an item he needs to defeat the nameless foe.

Upon being hired, Conrad soon finds that he is not the only one snooping around the mansion. He befriends his fellow servant-in-training, Christopher "Smith" (really Christopher Chant), who is searching for his friend Millie. Together, they discover that Millie is trapped in a Stallery of an alternate universe, caused by the shifts in probability. Conrad and Christopher must discover who is causing the probability shifts, rescue Millie, and figure out what to do about Conrad's so-called "black Fate", all while dealing with the imperious Mr. Amos, the mansion's butler, and his exacting tasks for trainees.

Millie is eventually freed and brought back to the real Stallery. She and Conrad try to work out what to do next. Gabriel De Witt, the current Chrestomanci and guardian of Millie and Christopher, arrives at the castle at the request of this England's king, hoping to figure out what is causing all the probability shifts. He reveals that Mr. Amos is actually the Count of Stallery and the person responsible for pulling the possibilities. Mr. Amos is also Conrad's uncle; he bought off his younger brother Hubert (Conrad and Anthea's father) by buying the bookshop for him to run. It is also revealed that the count, countess and others are actually frauds, posing as the aristocracy so that Amos can run Stallery without interference. Uncle Alfred is also exposed as a greedy fraud who had manipulated Conrad merely to get his hands on Stallery's millions. After this is all sorted out, Gabriel takes Millie and Christopher back to their world. Conrad joins them for seven years of magical training.

In the final part of the book, Conrad reveals that he became Christopher's best man at his wedding to Millie and continued living at Chrestomanci Castle for several years, but he could no longer stay away from his homeworld and returned to be the agent of the Chrestomanci.

== Characters ==
Conrad Tesdinic is told to take an alias at Stallery, "Grant", his Uncle Alfred's surname. Christopher suspects this as false, and so calls him "Grant" in a superior and often sarcastic way all throughout the book. Uncle Alfred runs the bookshop in town, and Conrad has grown up as an unpaid assistant in the bookstore. He brings his camera with him to Stallery and makes great use of it.

Christopher Chant also has an alias: "Christopher Smith". The character in the story is fifteen, older than in The Lives of Christopher Chant, but younger than in the other Chrestomanci books. He is witty, confident, charming, and he also is quite attached to Millie. Christopher can usually talk his way out of a situation, even though he goes rather vague at times.

Millie is Christopher's friend, formerly the goddess known as the Living Asheth. She becomes lost in the probability shifts at Stallery after running away from boarding school. Christopher's chief reason for coming to Stallery is to find her. When found by Conrad she becomes a maid for a while.

Mr. Amos is the pear-shaped, severe butler of Stallery. He insists on discipline and impeccable dress at all times. Conrad and Christopher cannot help but feel that there is more to his place than he is letting on.

Anthea Tesdinic is Conrad's sister, who left home a few years before the bulk of the story.

Count Robert is a supposed owner of Stallery who ultimately marries Anthea. His real name is Robert Brown.

== Awards ==
Conrad's Fate won Locus Award for young adult book.
