= Richard Tuggle =

American screenwriter and director

- Born: August 8, 1948 (age 78); Coral Gables, Florida, U.S.
- Occupations: Director, screenwriter

Richard Tuggle (born August 8, 1948) is an American screenwriter and film director, best known as the writer of Escape from Alcatraz (1979), the writer and director of Tightrope (1984), and the director of Out of Bounds (1986).
