= Ionicus =

English illustrator and cartoonist

- Born: Joshua Charles Armitage; 26 September 1913 Hoylake, Cheshire, England
- Died: 29 January 1998 (aged 84) Hoylake, Wirral, Merseyside
- Areas: Illustrator, cartoonist

Joshua Charles Armitage (26 September 1913 – 29 January 1998) was an English illustrator under the pen name Ionicus.

Ionicus may be known best for illustrating the covers of Penguin paperback editions of books by P. G. Wodehouse, though he contributed cartoons and drawings to Punch for more than 40 years, and provided cover designs and text illustrations for nearly 400 books in total.

== Biography ==
Armitage was born in 1913, in the town of Hoylake on the Irish Sea, county of Cheshire. When he died there in 1998, it was part of the Metropolitan Borough of Wirral. In 1939 he married Catherine Buckle, who died in 1988. They had two daughters.

Armitage studied at Liverpool School of Art, taught at Wallesey School of Art, and joined the Navy in 1940. He took the name Ionicus for his first cartoon that was published in Punch, 29 March 1944, after two ionic columns in the drawing. Over 40 years he contributed 358 drawings to the magazine.

== Book cover art ==
Although best known for his depiction of Wodehouse's idyllic England, Ionicus also provided dustjacket illustrations for well-known writers in other genres, such as the following:

- With interior "illustrations (some color)", a volume of Grimm's Fairy Tales published by Chanticleer Press Inc in The Heirloom Library, OCLC 11700391 (1950s probably)
- Children's fantasy novels by Diana Wynne Jones: Charmed Life, The Magicians of Caprona, and Witch Week (1977 to 1982)
- Horror novels by Ronald Chetwynd-Hayes: The King's Ghost, Tales From The Hidden World, and The Haunted Grange (1985 to 1988)

== Wartime art ==
During his wartime service in the British Navy, Ionicus contributed to the Admiralty-sponsored monthly magazine Ditty Box.
