= Paradise (1988 TV series) =

American Western television series (1988–1991)

- Also known as: Guns of Paradise
- Genre: Western
- Created by: David Jacobs; Robert Porter
- Written by: Thomas C. Chapman; Theresa G. Corigliano; Peter Dunne; Joel J. Feigenbaum; David Jacobs; Roberto Loiederman; Robert Porter
- Directed by: Cliff Bole; Michael Caffey; Peter Crane; Harry Harris; Nick Havinga; Michael Lange; Kim Manners; Richard M. Rawlings, Jr.; Joseph L. Scanlan; Robert Scheerer
- Starring: Lee Horsley; Jenny Beck; Matthew Newmark; Brian Lando; Michael Patrick Carter; Sigrid Thornton; Dehl Berti; John F. Bloom III
- Theme music composer: Jerrold Immel
- Composers: Bruce Babcock; Christopher Caliendo; Christopher Klatman
- Country of origin: United States
- Original language: English
- No. of seasons: 3
- No. of episodes: 57 (List of episodes)

Production
- Producers: Joel J. Feigenbaum; James L. Conway; David Jacobs
- Running time: 60 minutes
- Production companies: Roundelay Productions; Lorimar Television

Original release
- Network: CBS
- Release: October 27, 1988 – May 10, 1991

Paradise (later renamed Guns of Paradise) is an American family Western television series, broadcast by CBS from October 27, 1988, to May 10, 1991. Created by David Jacobs and Robert Porter, the series presents the adventures of fictitious gunfighter Ethan Allen Cord, whose sister left her four children in his custody when she died.

== Synopsis ==
Paradise, set from 1890 and on, starred Lee Horsley as Cord, a professional gunfighter who was forced to take custody of the four children of his sister Lucy (Kathryn Leigh Scott), a St. Louis singer who was dying and unable to make any other arrangements for their care. Cord realized his profession was unsuitable to child rearing and decided to change, renting a farm from Amelia Lawson (Sigrid Thornton), who also owned the local bank in the small town of Paradise, California (the origin of the title). Ethan tried to live a peaceful life, but was constantly haunted by his violent past and frequently called upon by the townspeople to defend them from lawlessness. Cord was close friends with John Taylor (Dehl Berti), a Native American medicine man, who often provided him with wise counsel and insights into human nature.

== Cast ==
=== Main cast ===
- Lee Horsley as Ethan Allen Cord
- Jenny Beck as Claire Carroll
- Matthew Newmark as Joseph Carroll
- Brian Lando as Benjamin Carroll
- Michael Patrick Carter as George Carroll
- Sigrid Thornton as Amelia Lawson
- Dehl Berti as John Taylor
- John F. Bloom III as Tiny

=== Guest cast ===
In a two-part episode, Gene Barry and Hugh O'Brian recreated their famous 1950s television roles of legendary gunslingers Bat Masterson and Wyatt Earp. The special two-part episode briefly launched the ratings-challenged series into the top 10 of the Nielsen Ratings. Robert Harland, who co-starred in the 1960 television Western Law of the Plainsman, made his last television appearance in 1988 on Paradise.

== Episodes ==
Season	Episodes	Originally released	
Season	Episodes	First released	Last released
1	22	October 27, 1988	May 20, 1989
2	22	September 10, 1989	April 28, 1990
3	13	January 4, 1991	May 10, 1991

== Production ==
=== Development ===
After the second season ended the show went on hiatus to make some changes. It returned to the air in January 1991 for its shortened and final third season. A new opening sequence introduced the series' new name, Guns of Paradise, an apparent attempt to remind viewers that the program, despite its title, was in fact a Western. Cord and Amelia were now engaged and in the process of building a new house; and Cord was in the process of achieving an official appointment to be the town's marshal, the role he had essentially been fulfilling unofficially.

In 1991, despite a loyal fan base and critical acclaim, the series was canceled after three seasons amid low viewer ratings. In the mid-'90s, The Family Channel ran Paradise in syndication.

== Home media ==
On April 25, 2017, Warner Bros. released the first season of Paradise on DVD.

== Awards and nominations ==
Year	Award	Category	Recipient	Result	Ref.
1988	American Society of Cinematographers Award	Outstanding Achievement in Cinematography in Regular Series	Richard M. Rawlings Jr. (For episode "Stray Bullet")	Won	
1989	American Society of Cinematographers Award	Outstanding Achievement in Cinematography in Regular Series	Richard M. Rawlings Jr. (For episode "Common Good")	Nominated	
1989	Primetime Emmy Award	Outstanding Main Title Theme Music	Jerrold Immel	Nominated	
1989	Primetime Emmy Award	Outstanding Cinematography for a Series	Richard M. Rawlings Jr. (For episode "Long Lost Lawson")	Nominated	
1989	Western Heritage Award	Fictional Television Drama	David Jacobs, Robert Porter, James L. Conway, Joel J. Feigenbaum, Sigrid Thornton and Lee Horsley (For episode "Stray Bullet")	Won	
1989	Young Artist Award	Best New Television Series		Nominated	
1989	Young Artist Award	Best Young Actor in a Nighttime Drama Series	Brian Lando	Nominated	
1989	Young Artist Award	Best Young Actor in a Nighttime Drama Series	Matthew Newmark	Nominated	
1989	Young Artist Award	Best Young Actress in a Nighttime Drama Series	Jenny Beck	Nominated	
1989	Young Artist Award	Best Young Actor Under 9 Years of Age	Michael Patrick Carter	Nominated	
1990	International Monitor Award	Best Editor – Film Originated Entertainment	M. Edward Salier and Lorimar (For episode "Burial Ground")	Nominated	
1990	Primetime Emmy Award	Outstanding Hairstyling for a Series	Linda Leiter Sharp (For episode "A Gathering of Guns")	Nominated	
1990	Viewers for Quality Television Award	Best Quality Drama Series		Nominated	
1990	Viewers for Quality Television Award	Best Actor in a Quality Drama Series	Lee Horsley	Nominated	
1990	Viewers for Quality Television Award	Best Supporting Actress in a Quality Drama Series	Sigrid Thornton	Nominated	
1990	Western Writers of America's Spur Award	Best Television	"Dust in the Wind"	Won	
1990	Young Artist Award	Best Young Actor Starring in a Television Series	Matthew Newmark	Nominated	
1990	Young Artist Award	Best Young Actress Starring in a Television Series	Jenny Beck	Nominated	
1990	Young Artist Award	Best Young Actor Guest Starring in a Television Series	Mark Ballou	Nominated	
1990	Young Artist Award	Best Young Actor Guest Starring in a Television Series	Michael John Burns	Nominated	
1990	Young Artist Award	Best Young Actress Guest Starring in a Television Series	Crystal McKellar	Nominated	
1990	Young Artist Award	Outstanding Performance by an Actor Under 9 Years of Age	Michael Patrick Carter	Nominated	
1991	Young Artist Award	Best Young Actor Starring in a Television Series	Matthew Newmark	Nominated	
1991	Young Artist Award	Best Young Actress Starring in a Television Series	Jenny Beck	Nominated	
1991	Young Artist Award	Best Young Actor Supporting or Recurring Role For a TV Series	Brian Lando	Nominated	
1991	Young Artist Award	Exceptional Performance by a Young Actor Under Nine	M.P. Carter	Nominated	
