= The Canterville Ghost (1985 film) =

1985 film

- DVD cover
- Genre: Family; Fantasy; Drama; Comedy
- Based on: "The Canterville Ghost"; 1887 short story by Oscar Wilde
- Screenplay by: B.W. Sandefur; Joseph Maurer; Bradley Wigor
- Directed by: William F. Claxton
- Starring: Richard Kiley; Jenny Beck; Shelley Fabares; Barry Van Dyke; Mary Wickes
- Theme music composer: Misha Segal
- Composer: Misha Segal
- Country of origin: United States
- Original language: English
- No. of episodes: 1

Production
- Executive producers: Joseph Maurer; Bradley Wigor
- Producer: Sascha Schneider
- Production locations: Greystone Park & Mansion - 905 Loma Vista Drive, Beverly Hills, California
- Cinematography: Sherman Kunkel
- Editor: Ed Cotter
- Running time: 56 min.

Original release
- Release: 1985

The Canterville Ghost is a 1985 American made-for-television fantasy-comedy film. This is one of many treatments based on Oscar Wilde's 1887 short story, "The Canterville Ghost".

The Actors
The Role	The Nickname	Actual Name
The Ghost	Sir Simon de Canterville	Richard Kiley
The Family	N/A	N/A
The Redemption	Virginia	Jenny Beck

== Plot ==
Sir Simon Canterville has haunted his castle as a ghost for centuries, doomed to remain so for displaying cowardice while alive. To break the curse, he must find a brave descendant to achieve rest.

== Cast ==
- Richard Kiley as Sir Simon De Canterville
- Jenny Beck as Virginia Otis
- Shelley Fabares as Lucy
- Barry Van Dyke as John Otis
- Mary Wickes as Mrs. Umney
- Christian Jacobs as Rob
- Brian Green as Willie
- Don Knight as Mr. Smythe

== See also ==
- List of ghost films
