= Charmed Life (novel) =

1977 fantasy novel by Diana Wynne Jones

- First edition
- Author: Diana Wynne Jones
- Cover artist: Ionicus
- Language: English
- Series: Chrestomanci
- Genre: Children's fantasy novel
- Publisher: Macmillan
- Publication date: 1977
- Publication place: United Kingdom
- Media type: Print
- Pages: 208 pp (first edition)
- ISBN: 0333214269
- OCLC: 670524621
- LC Class: PZ7.J684 Ch 1977
- Followed by: The Magicians of Caprona

Charmed Life is a children's fantasy novel by British author Diana Wynne Jones published by Macmillan Children's Books in 1977. It was the first Chrestomanci book and it remains a recommended introduction to the series. Greenwillow Books published a US edition within the calendar year.

The Chrestomanci books are set in a parallel world and are collectively named after a powerful enchanter and British government office named Chrestomanci whose duties include the supervision and enforcement of magical law, and only the most powerful enchanter is up to the task. Charmed Life is set during the tenure of Christopher Chant, who serves as Chrestomanci in five of the seven books and is often referred to by his title.

== Plot summary ==
When the Chant children, Gwendolen and Eric (known as "Cat") are orphaned after their parents die in a boating accident, Gwendolen petitions Chrestomanci to let them live at Chrestomanci Castle where she can further her magical training under the tutelage of the world's most powerful enchanter after a fortune teller tells her he will lead her to becoming a queen. The siblings move to Chrestomanci's castle where they meet him, his wife Millie and their two children Roger and Julia. Spiteful after Chrestomanci bans her from using magic, Gwendolen starts a feud with Julia, charms ghouls to stalk people through windows, spelling the churches stained glass windows and turning Cat's fiddle into a cat called Fiddle. When Chrestomanci fails to express interest or awe in her skill, spoiled Gwendolen buys illegal products from Mr Baslam and starts a dangerous spell with Cat, who is aware of the dangers but scared of disappointing her. Chrestomanci however manages to stop her and punishes them both severely, removing Gwendolen's witch abilities. The next morning, Gwendolen has disappeared and a confused lookalike named Janet has taken her place.

Working to hide Gwendolen's disappearance, Cat and Janet are forced to contend with many complications Gwendolen left in her wake, and Cat must come to terms with his sister's abandonment and his denial of her exploitive nature. Janet uncovers a plot which Gwendolen was involved in with the villagers, who are unaware of their switch, but is unable to discover the actual contents due to instructions left by Gwendolen. The two resolve to runaway to Janet's world with no magic. Janet realises the scope of Gwendolen's cruelty when she discovers a book of nine matches, five of which are already burnt. When Cat foolishly strikes a match and finds himself engulfed by flames, Janet's suspicions are confirmed: Cat, who has always believed himself utterly lacking in magical ability, is actually a nine-lived enchanter and is thus destined one day to take over the office of Chrestomanci, and Gwendolen has been leeching Cat's magic and wasting his lives to fuel her own magic.

Two weeks later, Cat and Janet attempt to open a portal to Janet's world using ingredients Gwendolen had previous stolen for her own escape, but instead conjure a vision of Gwendolen in an alternate universe where she is queen. Gwendolen's allies appear and capture the two children before forcing Cat to summon Chrestomanci before quickly using his weakness - silver - to subdue him. Gwendolen switches places with Janet, and reveals her plan to sacrifice her brother on the magic plinth before killing Chrestomanci in order to permanently open gateways to other worlds. When Gwendolen reveals to the others that they will have to sacrifice Cat multiple times as he has 9 lives, they are angered as it means he is a powerful enchanter and they will also need to kill him with his weakness on the final life. Gwendolen realises one of Cat's lives is stored in Fiddle as she used his magic to turn him into a cat and so they all split up to look for him. Cat is heartbroken by Gwendolen's betrayal, but Chrestomanci galvanises him into taking back enough magic to break his bonds as the witches return. Chrestomanci manages to hold them off, but is unable to call Millie who has enough magic to defeat them. Cat, realising he needs to take his power back, confronts Gwendolen and stands up to her managing to pull his magic back and rendering her useless.

The rest of the family arrive and capture everyone except for Gwendolen who uses her last remaining magic to seal herself in the other world, causing Janet to reappear. Chrestomanci offers to send her back, but Janet refuses as although she prefers her old life the double who took her own place is much happier. Janet is adopted into the family as Cat begins training to become the new Chrestomanci.

== Characters ==
The character of Christopher Chant (the Chrestomanci in this novel) appears as a young boy in The Lives of Christopher Chant and as a teenager in Conrad's Fate.

Eric Emelius "Cat" Chant
The protagonist of the novel, Cat is a young boy who is sent to live at Chrestomanci Castle after a steamboat accident causes his parents (Francis and Caroline Chant) to drown. He originally appears to have no magic and indeed holds this notion himself. As Charmed Life progresses it is revealed that Cat is actually an immensely powerful enchanter with nine lives. Unbeknownst to Cat, his sister Gwendolen constantly uses and abuses Cat's magic. He only has three lives remaining, having lost his first life when he only just survived being born, his second when Gwendolen had put his lives into a book of matches (to make them easier for her to use), the third when he drowned in the boating accident that killed his parents, the fourth when Gwendolen used it to turn his fiddle into a cat (which he kept as a pet and named Fiddle), the fifth when Gwendolen used it to take her into her new world where she reigned as queen, and the sixth when he burned a match from his 'life book' of matches in an attempt to prove that he didn't have nine lives and the matches weren't connected to him. This matchbox is his main weakness.

Gwendolen Chant
The main antagonist of the novel, and like Cat, she survived the boating accident which killed their parents. Cat believed that Gwendolen could not drown because she was a witch, and that he had only survived by clinging to her (he did not realise that he had in fact drowned). She appears to be a gifted witch, although one who uses magic for selfish and dark purposes. It is eventually revealed that she did not have powerful witchcraft of her own, but borrowed substantial amounts of magic from Cat. Although she was very motherly to Cat in the past, she becomes nastier and bossier to him as the story progresses. Gwendolen is extremely ambitious and has master plans to be Queen or to rule the world. Gwendolen greatly dislikes the current Chrestomanci, because he refused to acknowledge her powers and also denied her further witchcraft education.

Janet Chant
Gwendolen's counterpart from another world. Before being pulled into World Twelve A, she had lived in a nice, ordinary home in a world similar to ours. While Gwendolen was bossy and bold, Janet was quite shy and jolly. No one was to know that Gwendolen had spirited away to another world, so Cat and Janet had to pretend Janet was Gwendolen. When they were trying to keep it a secret, it is later revealed that Chrestomanci had known about it all along. She later decides to stay in Cat's world and becomes Chrestomanci's ward.

Chrestomanci – Christopher Chant
Chrestomanci is very unpredictable and random. He is a nine-lifed enchanter like Cat, but only has two lives left after a series of accidents took place when he was younger. Chrestomanci has a strong magic and must appear whenever summoned; he works for the government, controlling magic and keeping hold on wayward witches and wizards.

Millie Chant
Millie is Christopher's wife and an extremely powerful enchantress. She is described as plump, jolly and cheerful. She takes a disliking to Gwendolen when she insults her and is the only one in the castle to take action against her after Gwendolen's first offence. She seems to like Cat a lot, but he tends to try to avoid everyone in the castle. Her backstory of being from another world is explored in The Lives Of Christopher Chant.

Julia Chant
Julia is one of Chrestomanci's two children. She is quite fat and normally nice, but proves to have a vengeful streak when Gwendolen provokes her. Julia's magic seems to centre on a handkerchief, but her magic is lesser than Cat's, and she often finds her attempts at revenge disrupted by him.

Roger Chant
Roger is Julia's brother and the other child of Chrestomanci. He tends to be laid back and not as hot-tempered as his sister. Roger is more inclined to co-operate with Cat and to entertain him. He usually ignores Gwendolen, unless things get too out of hand.

== Awards ==
Jones and Charmed Life won the annual Guardian Children's Fiction Prize, a once-in-a-lifetime book award judged by a panel of British children's writers. The novel was also a commended runner up for the Carnegie Medal from the Library Association, recognising the year's best children's book by a British subject. (Note: Since 1995 there are usually eight books on the Carnegie shortlist. According to CCSU, some runners up through 2002 were Commended (from 1955) or Highly Commended (from 1966); the Highly Commended distinction became approximately annual in 1979. There were about 160 commendations of both kinds in 48 years including Jones alone in 1977.) It also won the German Preis der Leseratten.

== Translations ==
Dutch and Finnish-language translations were published in 1980, followed by German. Danish, Italian, and French editions were published in the 1990s (when the four early novels were in print); it was later published in Polish and Spanish, Chinese, Vietnamese, and Serbian editions.
