= List of Paradise episodes =

The following is a list of the 57 episodes of the television show Paradise (later Guns of Paradise).

== Series overview ==
Season	Episodes	Originally released	
Season	Episodes	First released	Last released
1	22	October 27, 1988	May 20, 1989
2	22	September 10, 1989	April 28, 1990
3	13	January 4, 1991	May 10, 1991

== Episodes ==
=== Season 1 (1988–89) ===
No. overall	No. in season	Title	Directed by	Written by	Original release date	Prod. code	U.S. viewers (millions)
1	1	"The News from St. Louis"	David Jacobs	David Jacobs & Robert Porter	October 27, 1988	187100	19.4
Ethan Allen Cord, a single gunman, is asked by his dying sister to take care of her four young children.
2	2	"The Holstered Gun"	Joseph L. Scanlan	James L. Conway	November 3, 1988	187101	15.1
Ethan gives up on his guns and decides to try ranching. Three new troublemakers arrive to the town.
3	3	"Founder's Day"	Michael Ray Rhodes	Jim Byrnes	November 10, 1988	187106	15.4
Amelia shoots and kills a bank robber. Ben accidentally kills a rabbit while playing with Ethan's gun.
4	4	"The Ghost Dance"	Joseph L. Scanlan	Robert Porter	November 24, 1988	187103	15.3
John Taylor is the target of a lynch mob.
5	5	"Devil's Canyon"	Robert Scheerer	Roberto Loiederman	December 1, 1988	187104	16.4
Claire is kidnapped by a mountain man and his son.
6	6	"Stray Bullet"	Michael Caffey	Richard J. Clayman	December 8, 1988	187108	11.7
Ethan accidentally shoots Amelia.
7	7	"The Promise"	Nick Havinga	James L. Conway	December 15, 1988	187111	14.5
Ethan and the boys are stranded in the desert at Christmas.
8	8	"Childhood's End"	Kim Manners	Richard J. Clayman	December 29, 1988	187102	15.4
Claire befriends a young girl who has been sold into prostitution. Note: Milla Jovovich as Katie
9	9	"A Private War"	Robert Scheerer	Robert Porter	January 5, 1989	187112	18.1
The mine manager sets out to buy up the town's businesses.
10	10	"Hard Choices"	Cliff Bole	Joel J. Feigenbaum	January 12, 1989	445463	15.2
Wanted for murder in Texas, Ethan must decide whether to take the children and run or turn himself in.
11	11	"Crossroads"	Peter Crane	James L. Conway	January 26, 1989	445464	15.3
Joseph considers joining a gang of outlaws.
12	12	"The Traveler"	Michael Caffey	Robert Porter	February 2, 1989	445465	17.1
Ethan and Amelia befriend a traveler who's lost his memory but slowly realizes that he was hired to kill Ethan.
13	13	"The Secret"	Michael Lange	Joel J. Feigenbaum	February 8, 1989	445466	18.4
With no cooperation from the townspeople, Ethan tries to uncover the truth behind a murder.
14	14	"A House Divided"	Michael Caffey	James L. Conway	February 16, 1989	445467	17.3
Robbers seize the hotel and threaten to kill the people.
15	15	"The Last Warrior"	Peter Crane	Joel J. Feigenbaum	February 23, 1989	445469	18.0
John Taylor attempts to stop a lumber company from building a road over land he claims is his.
16	16	"Vengeance"	Cliff Bole	Robert Porter	March 16, 1989	445472	17.2
Ethan is blinded by hatred.
17	17	"A Matter of Honor (1)"	Robert Scheerer	James L. Conway	April 8, 1989	445473	13.1
A rancher starts a range war when he hires a notorious gunslinger. Notes: Chuck Connors as Gideon McKay
18	18	"Honor Bound (2)"	Cliff Bole	Joel J. Feigenbaum	April 15, 1989	445474	12.8
Ethan sobers up the gunslinger, who turns on Ethan in the water-rights war against the small ranchers. Notes: Chuck Connors as Gideon McKay
19	19	"Hour of the Wolf"	Robert Scheerer	Robert Brennan	April 29, 1989	445470	12.6
Claire is bitten by a rabid wolf.
20	20	"Treasure"	Nicholas Sgarro	Tom Chapman	May 6, 1989	445455	12.1
John Taylor tells the boys a story about a buried treasure. They find a map and strike out in search of the treasure. Claire and Joseph soon follow looking for them. Ethan and Amelia have to cut short a planned romantic get away to look for the kids.
21	21	"Squaring Off"	Nick Havinga	Robert Porter	May 13, 1989	445475	13.1
Ethan rescues the Texas Ranger who once rescued him, but enrages the police chief who framed the Ranger.
22	22	"Long Lost Lawson"	James L. Conway	Joel J. Feigenbaum	May 20, 1989	445476	11.6
Amelia's husband returns and stirs up trouble.

=== Season 2 (1989–90) ===
No. overall	No. in season	Title	Directed by	Written by	Original release date	Prod. code	U.S. viewers (millions)
23	1	"A Gathering of Guns: Parts 1 & 2"	Michael Lange	James L. Conway & Joel J. Feigenbaum	September 10, 1989	445954	23.0
24	2	"A Gathering of Guns: Parts 1 & 2"	Cliff Bole	James L. Conway & Joel J. Feigenbaum	September 10, 1989	445954	23.0
Wyatt Earp, Bat Masterson, and other famous gunfighters join forces to break Ethan out of a New Mexico prison. Notes: Johnny Crawford as Doug McKay
25	3	"Home Again"	Russ Mayberry	Robert Porter	September 16, 1989	445955	14.9
After a prison escape, Ethan is followed home by Wyatt Earp and by a reporter who wants to know the reason.
26	4	"The Common Good"	Michael Lange	James L. Conway	September 23, 1989	445951	18.7
Ethan temporarily acts as marshal after Deputy Charlie is humiliated by a famous outlaw. Notes: First appearance of Craig Bierko as Johnny Ryan.
27	5	"Dead Run"	Michael Caffey	Joel J. Feigenbaum	October 7, 1989	445952	15.3
Laid-off miners ambush Ethan and Amelia, who are on their way to Virginia City to deposit some great amount of money.
28	6	"All the Pretty Little Horses"	Cliff Bole	Story by : Jim Byrnes; Teleplay by : Jim Byrnes & Pamela Douglas	October 14, 1989	445956	13.6
A woman seeks revenge on the railroad.
29	7	"Orphan Train"	Russ Mayberry	Robert Porter	October 28, 1989	445957	15.6
A brother and sister are separated when an orphan train comes through town.
30	8	"The Burial Ground"	Harry Harris	James L. Conway	November 4, 1989	445958	18.0
After escaping the reservation, Chief Black Cloud returns with his tribe to his ancestral home, Paradise. Notes: Nick Ramus as Chief Black Cloud
31	9	"A Proper Stranger"	Cliff Bole	Joel J. Feigenbaum	November 11, 1989	445959	17.3
A live-in school teacher threatens Ethan and Amelia's courtship. Notes: Crystal Bernard as the Teacher
32	10	"Boomtown"	Harry Harris	Robert Porter	November 18, 1989	445960	17.9
Ben, George and Wade find gold on the ranch.
33	11	"The Return of Johnny Ryan"	Nicholas Sgarro	James L. Conway	December 2, 1989	445961	15.9
Johnny Ryan, the killer whose gang once sprang him from the Paradise jail, returns for revenge against Ethan. Notes: Second appearance of Craig Bierko as Johnny Ryan.
34	12	"The Plague"	Kate Swofford Tilley	Story by : Fred Miller & Fred Ruf; Teleplay by : Peter Dunne	December 9, 1989	445962	14.8
The town comes down with smallpox.
35	13	"The Gates of Paradise"	David Jacobs	Peter Dunne	January 6, 1990	445963	17.7
Two strangers arrive to Paradise. First is an equestrian who has two grim appointments to keep before the New Year. The second - a simple youngster left in the forest. Notes: First appearance of Patrick Labyorteaux as Jerome. Jerry Hardin as Uncle Peter
36	14	"The Devil's Escort"	Michael Lange	Joel J. Feigenbaum	January 13, 1990	445964	13.3
Ethan escorts dangerous criminal Dan Bishop to Paradise for trial.
37	15	"Dangerous Cargo"	Michael Caffey	Roberto Loiederman	January 20, 1990	445965	16.3
Ethan helps guard opium shipments for the mine. The kids have a house guest named Edith.
38	16	"Till Death Do Us Part"	Cliff Bole	Robert Porter	February 3, 1990	445966	15.4
Joseph's friend Frances is married to an abusive judge.
39	17	"Avenging Angel"	James L. Conway	Robert Brennan	February 10, 1990	445967	15.3
Ethan and Claire butt heads when a convicted murderer comes to town as the new minister.
40	18	"Crossfire"	Harry Harris	James L. Conway	February 17, 1990	445968	15.8
Doug McKay gets Ethan involved in a range war without his knowledge. Amelia and Claire disapprove of it. Ethan is torn between helping his friend and measuring up to Amelia and Claire's expectations. Notes: Chuck Connors as Gideon McKay, Johnny Crawford as Doug McKay
41	19	"Shadow of a Doubt"	Cliff Bole	Joel J. Feigenbaum	March 3, 1990	445969	14.0
Jerome is on trial for the strangling of a young woman named Colleen. Notes: Second appearance of Patrick Labyorteaux as Jerome
42	20	"The Coward"	Michael Lange	Arthur Bernard Lewis	April 7, 1990	445971	12.6
Ethan harbors a young deserter wanted by the Army for cowardice and by a mother who blames him for her son's death. Notes: Matthew Laborteaux as Sam Devitt, K.T. Oslin as Lenore
43	21	"The Chase"	Harry Harris	Robert Porter	April 14, 1990	445970	14.0
Amelia encourages the town to invest in a trolley company that swindles the town. Ben and George build a flying machine.
44	22	"Dust on the Wind"	James L. Conway	Joel J. Feigenbaum & James L. Conway	April 28, 1990	445972	13.4
Ethan and Amelia begin to make wedding plans. An explosion at the mine causes numerous deaths.

=== Season 3 (1991) ===
No. overall	No. in season	Title	Directed by	Written by	Original release date	Prod. code	U.S. viewers (millions)
45	1	"Out of the Ashes"	Cliff Bole	James L. Conway	January 4, 1991	446701	19.0
Paradise is booming thanks to a new copper mine. Notes: Robert Fuller as the Marshal
46	2	"The Bounty"	Michael Caffey	Joel J. Feigenbaum	January 11, 1991	446702	17.6
Ethan pursues a murderer with the unwanted help of a bounty hunter. George struggles with his reading, and Ben faces a bully at school.
47	3	"The Women"	Cliff Bole	Thomas C. Chapman	January 25, 1991	446704	16.8
Ethan and Dakota go after a gang who tried to rob the Paradise bank. John Taylor is shot and needs Joseph to extract the bullet.
48	4	"Bad Blood"	Harry Harris	Joel J. Feigenbaum	February 1, 1991	446705	13.5
After yet another assassination attempt, Ethan finally travels to Texas to stand trial for murder.
49	5	"The Valley of Death"	Michael Caffey	James L. Conway	February 8, 1991	446706	13.9
Amelia is left with doubts when Ethan has to leave the wedding ceremony to go after a gang.
50	6	"A Bullet Through the Heart"	Harry Harris	Robert Porter	February 15, 1991	446703	14.5
A drifter named Wick is suspected of murder. Notes: To keep the chronological order, this episode should be watched after "The Bounty" (3.02).
51	7	"See No Evil"	Cliff Bole	Robert Porter	February 22, 1991	446707	14.1
Amelia and John Taylor send for a specialist when some of the Paradise residents come down with a mysterious illness.
52	8	"Birthright"	Harry Harris	Joel J. Feigenbaum	March 8, 1991	446710	11.9
The children's father, a gambler hoping to regain his inheritance rights, challenges Ethan for custody.
53	9	"A Study in Fear"	Nick Havinga	Robert Porter	March 29, 1991	446711	13.4
Ethan tries to determine who is responsible for a sudden series of murders.
54	10	"The Search for K.C. Cavanaugh"	Harry Harris	Theresa G. Corigliano	April 5, 1991	446712	12.1
Ethan catches a notorious woman outlaw and brings her back to stand trial for murder.
55	11	"Shield of Gold"	Cliff Bole	Joel J. Feigenbaum	April 12, 1991	446713	12.4
As the town marshal, Ethan is placed in a difficult position when his best friend John Taylor steals a museum exhibit and refuses to return it.
56	12	"Twenty-Four Hours"	Richard M. Rawlings Jr.	Robert Porter	May 3, 1991	446714	13.0
After going days without sleep, Ethan begins to wonder if his job as marshal is worth the petty aggravations. Notes: Nicollette Sheridan as Lily
57	13	"Unfinished Business"	Harry Harris	James L. Conway & Joel J. Feigenbaum	May 10, 1991	446708	8.6
A vengeful gunfighter, Dan Bridges, comes after Ethan.
