= Jenny Beck =

American actress

- Born: August 3, 1974 (age 52); Los Angeles, California, U.S.
- Occupation: Actress
- Years active: 1982–1991

Jenny Beck (born August 3, 1974) is an American actress best known for playing a young Elizabeth on V: The Final Battle and V: The Series (episode 1).

The daughter of Jim and Lori Beck, she began acting when she was 2 years old. She played Claire Carroll on the TV series Paradise.

Her film debut occurred in Tightrope (1984), and she also acted in The Canterville Ghost (1985) and Troll (1986).

Beck also made TV commercials for products that included Duncan Hines, Purolator Oil, and Trix.

In 1990, Beck received the American Youth Foundation Award for her community service. Her performance in Troll earned her a Youth in Film Award nomination for best supporting actress in a film, comedy, fantasy, or drama.

== Filmography ==
=== Film ===
Year	Title	Role	Notes
1984	Tightrope	Penny Block	
1985	The Canterville Ghost	Virginia Otis	TV movie
1986	Troll	Wendy Anne Potter	
1987	Downpayment on Murder		TV movie

=== Television ===
Year	Title	Role	Notes
1982	Father Murphy	Henrietta	5 episodes
1983, 1985	T.J. Hooker	Valerie Webb, Chrissie Hooker	3 episodes
1984	V: The Final Battle	Elizabeth Maxwell (age 10)	Episode: "Part Three"
1984	V	Elizabeth Maxwell, Elizabeth Maxwell Clone as Child	2 episodes
1984	Hotel	Sarah Lawrence	Episode: "Ideals"
1985	Finder of Lost Loves	Sharon Mason	Episode: "From the Heart"
1986	Falcon Crest	Young Jordan	2 episodes
1986	Matlock	Lila Harrison	Episode: "The Affair"
1987	Gimme a Break!	Molly Hamilton	Episode: "Joey, the Gigolo"
1987	CBS Summer Playhouse	Diane	Episode: "Day to Day"
1988–1991	Paradise	Claire Carroll	56 episodes
1991	Roseanne	Tanya	Episode: "Home-Ec"
