= Tightrope (film) =

1984 film by Richard Tuggle

- Theatrical release poster
- Directed by: Richard Tuggle
- Written by: Richard Tuggle
- Produced by: Fritz Manes; Clint Eastwood
- Starring: Clint Eastwood; Geneviève Bujold; Dan Hedaya; Alison Eastwood; Jennifer Beck
- Cinematography: Bruce Surtees
- Edited by: Joel Cox
- Music by: Lennie Niehaus
- Production company: The Malpaso Company
- Distributed by: Warner Bros.
- Release date: August 17, 1984 (U.S.)
- Running time: 114 minutes
- Language: English
- Budget: $4 million
- Box office: $48.1 million

Tightrope is a 1984 American neo-noir psychological thriller film directed and written by Richard Tuggle and produced by and starring Clint Eastwood, Geneviève Bujold, Dan Hedaya, Alison Eastwood and Jennifer Beck.

Tightrope received mostly positive reviews from critics, crediting the performance of the villain, the relationship between Eastwood and Bujold.

== Plot ==
A young woman walking home from her birthday party is stalked by a man. A man dressed as a police officer offers to escort her to her front door. The policeman, however, is actually the stalker.

The next day, divorced New Orleans police detective Wes Block, along with his daughters Penny and Amanda, take in a stray dog, adding to the several strays they already have. As the family prepares to go to a Saints game, Block is summoned to a crime scene, forcing him to break his plans with his daughters.

The young woman was strangled in her bed. The killer left no fingerprints, but waited in her apartment until midnight to kill her, even pausing to make himself coffee. At the brothel where the woman worked, Block interviews a prostitute who would perform group sex. The prostitute seduces Block, loosening his necktie, which he accidentally leaves behind.

The murderer rapes his victims, and has been leaving behind forensic evidence, including a residue of glass fragments and barley. Beryl Thibodeaux, who runs a rape prevention program, advises Block on the case. The second victim is also a sex worker, and is strangled in a Jacuzzi. Block interviews one of her co-workers while the two prepare to have sex. He handcuffs the woman to the bed.

While enquiring about the victims at another brothel, Block has sex with a prostitute. The hidden killer watches the two. The next morning, Block is called to the scene of a third victim, which turns out to be the prostitute he was with the night before. Under the guise of working on the case, Block flirts with Thibodeaux, and the two spend the rest of the day together.

The killer taunts Block by sending a doll with a note, which directs him to another brothel. Once there, a dominatrix informs Block that someone hired her to be whipped by Block. She is then supposed to send Block to a gay bar. At the bar, he meets up with a man who was hired by the killer to have sex with Block. Block instructs the man to pick up his pay as scheduled and follows him, hoping to catch the killer. However, Block is too late, and the man is killed.

The killer kidnaps the second victim's co-worker, and dumps her body in the Piazza d'Italia. He drapes Block's abandoned necktie on a nearby statue. Block and Thibodeaux go out on a second date, escorting his children, while secretly observed by the killer. While later in bed, Block shies away from intimacy with Thibodeaux, and then has a nightmare that he attacks her in the guise of the killer.

One of the victim's clothes has money in it, which the police trace to the payroll of the Dixie Brewery. The money has the same glass and barley residue on it that has been cropping up at all the crime scenes. While Block investigates in the brewery, the killer watches him. That night, the killer breaks into Block's home, killing the nanny and some of Block's pets, and handcuffing and gagging Amanda. Block is nearly strangled in a struggle after arriving and is only saved when one of his dogs repeatedly bites the killer. Block fires two shots at the killer as he escapes. The killer later watches from concealment as the police investigate the scene.

While going through news clippings, Block comes across the name of a former NOPD officer, Leander Rolfe, whom Block had arrested for raping two girls. Rolfe had been paroled from prison and was working at the brewery. Block and his team stake out Rolfe's apartment, but Rolfe has gone to attack Thibodeaux at her home (slaying the cops guarding her). Realizing what is going on, Block races to Thibodeaux's home, and disrupts Rolfe's attempt to strangle her. Block chases Rolfe through a cemetery and into a rail yard. In the ensuing battle, they end up in the path of an oncoming train; Block moves out of the way in time, while Rolfe is run over and killed. Block accepts Thibodeaux's touch after saying that everything will be okay.

== Cast ==
- Clint Eastwood as Detective Wes Block
- Geneviève Bujold as Beryl Thibodeaux
- Dan Hedaya as Detective Joe Molinari
- Alison Eastwood as Amanda Block
- Jenny Beck as Penny Block
- Marco St. John as Leander Rolfe
- Rod Masterson as Patrolman Gallo
- Jamie Rose as Melanie Silber
- Janet MacLachlan as Dr. Yarlofsky

== Production ==
Tightrope was filmed in New Orleans in the fall of 1983. Filming locations include the French Quarter, the Piazza d'Italia, the Dixie Beer Brewery, the Crescent City Connection (the second span of which is seen under construction), and the Creole Queen riverboat.

While Tuggle retained the director's credit, Eastwood reportedly directed much of the film himself after finding Tuggle too indecisive.

== Reception ==
The film was released in United States theaters in August 1984. It eventually grossed $48 million at the United States box office. In its opening weekend Tightrope was number 1, taking in $9,156,545, an average $5,965 per theater.

=== Critical response ===
Tightrope received mostly positive reviews from critics. It has an 86% "freshness" rating on Rotten Tomatoes, out of 14 reviews with a mean of 6.7 of a possible 10. Roger Ebert praised the film for taking chances by exploring the idea of a hard-nosed cop learning to respect a woman. He cites the film as "a lot more ambitious" than the Dirty Harry movies. Ebert's colleague Gene Siskel also praised the film during their on-air review of the film on At the Movies, crediting the performance of the villain, the relationship between Eastwood and Geneviève Bujold, and Eastwood doing "a terrific job risking his star charisma playing a louse" and also "taking us inside to see what it's really like to abuse women". Janet Maslin concluded that the film "isn't quite top-level Eastwood, but it's close." David Denby stated that as an actor Eastwood "gave his most complex and forceful performance to date."

== Bibliography ==
- Hughes, Howard (2009). Aim for the Heart. London: I.B. Tauris. ISBN 978-1-84511-902-7.
