= Troll 3 =

Troll 3 may refer to:

- The Crawlers (film), a 1991 Italian horror film also known as Troll 3
- Quest for the Mighty Sword, a 1990 Italian fantasy film also known as Troll 3
