= The Lives of Christopher Chant =

1988 fantasy book by Diana Wynne Jones

- First edition
- Author: Diana Wynne Jones
- Language: English
- Series: Chrestomanci
- Genre: Children's fantasy novel
- Publisher: Methuen
- Publication date: August 1988
- Publication place: United Kingdom
- Media type: Print (hardcover)
- Pages: 240 pp (first edition)
- ISBN: 978-0-416-10742-5
- OCLC: 59201437
- Preceded by: Witch Week
- Followed by: Mixed Magics

The Lives of Christopher Chant is a children's fantasy novel by British author Diana Wynne Jones published by Methuen Children's Books in 1988. It was the fourth published of the seven Chrestomanci books (1977 to 2006). When the first four books were reissued in the UK to accompany the fifth as a matching set in 2000, The Lives of Christopher Chant was subtitled The Childhood of Chrestomanci and cover illustrations by Paul Slater branded them all The Worlds of Chrestomanci.

The "Chrestomanci" books are set in a parallel world and are collectively named after a powerful enchanter and British government official known as the Chrestomanci, an office that requires a powerful enchanter, supervises the use of magic. The Lives is set during the adolescence of Christopher Chant who is Chrestomanci in five of the seven books.

== Fictional background ==
"The Worlds of Chrestomanci" brand of some late twentieth century editions alludes to their setting, a multiverse often called the Related Worlds, which young Christopher calls "Anywheres" in this volume. Worlds have branched from common ancestors at important events in history, such as English and French victories in the Battle of Agincourt. Some people can move between worlds and twelve series of similar worlds have been labelled by the English people of the stories. World 12A is the primary specific setting of this volume, and of the series, where Chrestomanci resides in England.

== Plot ==
The novel tells the story of Christopher Chant's childhood in a magic filled Victorian style era. Although both of his parents are powerful practitioners of magic, the two are constantly at loggerheads; his father (an enchanter, the strongest type of magic-user) is entirely devoted to his work, to such a degree that the young Christopher is afraid that he would not recognise him should the two meet in public. On the other hand, his mother (a sorceress, the second-strongest type of magic-user) is a social climber, and is apparently only married to his father for his social connections. Christopher finds solace in his uncle Ralph, but due to his travelling job they rarely see each other.

The only escape that Christopher has is through his dreams, in which he is able to escape to other worlds. While he is not the only person with this ability, seemingly no one is able to do it so easily as he. Christopher is able to bring items with him into the real world, and after one of his many nannies discovers his hoard of items and accuses him of stealing, he tells Uncle Ralph of his power. Uncle Ralph is intrigued by this and has Christopher go on a 'test' to see what he can bring back. In the place between worlds, which takes the form of a valley, Christopher meets Tacroy, who is supposed to guide him on his uncle's orders, but the two discover that whilst Tacroy is projecting his mind there Christopher is physically going into the other worlds, something which was thought to be impossible.

Christopher and Tacroy go on several of these trips, and on one to World 10 they get separated. Christopher meets 'The Living Asheth' a girl his age who is a vessel for Asheth, the Goddess of her world. He makes a deal with her for one of her magic temple cats, Throgmorten, but as she helps him escape he is speared by The Arm of Asheth, who is a member of the Goddess's army. After waking up in his bed with Throgmorten, Christopher accidentally causes a curtain rod to fall down and spear him through the heart, although he survives. This experience prompts his parents to send him to a boarding school where Christopher forgets to travel in his dreams because he enjoys it so much. Several ordinary months go by and Christopher decides to become a professional cricketer whilst his parents divorce. His friend accidentally hits him in the head with a cricket bat, killing him. He wakes up confused in the morgue, where he then falls asleep in the hospital. The current Chrestomanci, Gabriel De Witt, visits him, but disbelieves claims of him being an enchanter. Christopher's father takes Christopher to several witches and discovers that a silver coin Ralph insisted he always carry on him was stopping him from doing magic.

Chrestomanci realises Christopher is a nine-lived enchanter and brings him to his castle to train to be the next Chrestomanci. He absolutely hates living there and disobeys all of the rules, even actively going against them. He returns to travelling with Tacroy for his uncle and repays the deal with The Living Asheth, giving her a series of books about a girl named Millie at boarding school. The two become close friends and she insists he call her Millie instead. Christopher dies multiple times during these trips and always wakes up in his own world only to die in freak accidents similar to the prior ones. Millie discovers that when she grows too old for Asheth to use her she is going to be sacrificed to her. Millie uses her magic to partially possess a statue of Asheth, allowing her to safely travel worlds similar to Christopher. She takes refuge in Christopher's world, initially annoying him, although he grows to appreciate her presence.

Christopher discovers that Chrestomanci is investigating a smuggler named 'The Wraith' who somehow manages to bring illegal items from other worlds. Chrestomanci reveals to every person in the castle that their close friend Mordecai Roberts was working for 'The Wraith', and Christopher is shocked to find Mordecai is actually Tacroy. Tacroy pretends not to know Christopher and reveals to him that his uncle is 'The Wraith'. Ralph manages to kill Chrestomanci by taking his lives and scattering them across worlds so nobody could find him. Christopher uses Throgmorten to trap Ralph before Millie is able to subdue him. Millie discovers that Asheth is too vain to actually give a mortal girl magic and she is in reality one of the most powerful enchantresses in existence.

Learning that Mordecai is enchanted to work for Ralph, Christopher and Millie travel to World 11, which is a mysterious place that only has one timeline. Christopher and Millie are both able to outwit the ruler of World 11 and free Mordecai, who willingly becomes a servant of Chrestomanci, but Christopher sacrifices another one of his lives. Christopher's parents reveal to him they are getting back together, but this time for love, and Christopher decides to continue living at the castle with the newly revived Chrestomanci and Millie. As Christopher attempts to travel he discovers he no longer can, as he only has two lives remaining.

== Characters ==
=== Christopher Chant ===
Christopher is the protagonist of the book. He is nice and well-mannered, coming from a wealthy family, but he tends to sulk and can be quite rude to people.

Christopher is discovered to be the next Chrestomanci when his best friend hits him in the head with a cricket bat by accident, killing him. The doctor had pronounced him dead, but then he woke up in the morgue, confused. His father recognised Christopher as having more than one life, and got hold of Dr. Pawson, a magic expert. Christopher is furious, seeing as he had to quit school for magic lessons. He discovers that he has an exceptional talent for magic, as long as he has no silver on him. After many lessons, he is spirited away to Chrestomanci Castle, where he is unhappy and has no friends but a cat he brings from Asheth Temple, Throgmorten, and the spirit travelling guide Uncle Ralph sends along, called Tacroy.

=== The Living Asheth / Millie ===
The Living Asheth (also called "The Goddess") is the physical embodiment of a goddess worshipped in a world in Series 10. She is a girl about Christopher's age and is also an enchantress (although she at first thinks her magic comes from Asheth). Christopher first encounters her when he is sent by his Uncle Ralph to retrieve a living animal from his inter-world travels. The Goddess trades him a particularly nasty cat called Throgmorten in exchange for books from his world—the goddess is not allowed to touch anything from her world that isn't holy. Christopher brings her books set in a boarding school, revolving around a girl named "Millie" (the series is reminiscent of Enid Blyton's boarding school series).

The Goddess finds out that she is to die when she grows older and the Temple gets a new Living Asheth, so she runs away to Christopher's world after he tells her how he travelled from Series to Series. She adopts the name "Millie" from the books Christopher brought her. She winds up living in Christopher's world, going to school like an ordinary, wealthy girl with the funds the chief priestess gives her from the Temple. Later in the series, the Goddess becomes Christopher's wife, and is seen as such from Charmed Life onwards.

=== Tacroy / Mordecai Roberts ===
Tacroy is the spirit traveller Uncle Ralph had hired to help Christopher along with the raids. He is an easygoing man, and is a legendary cricket player at the Castle. He has a soft side for Miss Rosalie, a worker at the Castle. Tacroy belongs in Series Eleven, where their morals are different. He works as a spy, first told to work for a good man (Chrestomanci), and then a criminal (Uncle Ralph).

Tacroy always went with Christopher. While his body lay in stasis back in Christopher's world, his spirit travelled with Christopher, loading carts and chatting. Tacroy was Christopher's source of joy while in the Castle, having grown to hate it there, but he is caught by the workers in the Castle smuggling goods for the Wraith. He is thrown in prison, but Christopher gets him out as soon as he could, after the current Chrestomanci's lives are scattered all over the Series by Uncle Ralph after he shot him with a special gun from Series One. He is eventually freed by Christopher, and given a pardon by the Chrestomanci. In the short story Stealer of Souls it is implied that Tacroy and Miss Rosalie marry and look after Gabriel de Witt once he has retired from the post of Chrestomanci.

=== Uncle Ralph ===
Uncle Ralph is Christopher's beloved uncle, who is also the main antagonist of the book. Uncle Ralph is the leader of the Wraith, an underground criminal organisation that smuggles magical goods and sells them through the black market. When Christopher was born, his father learned that silver would be dangerous or fatal to Christopher, and so was wary of Uncle Ralph, whose last name is Argent, which means silver. He is Christopher's mother's brother, and pretended to help out his sister when his brother-in-law had lost their money. Christopher grew to love him, but shied away from him when he discovered Uncle Ralph's true identity. Throgmorten has an extreme dislike of him, as Uncle Ralph was going to cut him up and sell his parts. Uncle Ralph is merciless and was a millionaire by the time Christopher found out who he was.

=== Chrestomanci - Gabriel De Witt ===
Gabriel De Witt is a nine-lived enchanter titled Chrestomanci. He dislikes living with Christopher as much as Christopher dislikes him, and is shown to care about his job more than anything else. Despite being cold towards Christopher, he is widely liked and has many friends and contacts across the worlds as well as being an effective teacher.

== Awards ==
The Lives was commended for the 1988 Carnegie Medal.
