= Magic in fiction =

Magic depicted in fictional stories

Magic in fiction is the endowment of characters or objects in works of fiction or fantasy with powers that do not naturally occur in the real world. Magic often serves as a plot device and has long been a component of fiction.

== Historical beliefs ==
Historically, witches such as the Weird Sisters in William Shakespeare's Macbeth, wizards such as Prospero in The Tempest, or other characters like Doctor Faustus in Christopher Marlowe's play of the same name were widely considered to be engaging in real-world or realistic magic. Contemporary authors tend to treat magic as an imaginary idea, opting to build their worlds with a blank slate where the laws of reality do not carry as much weight.

== Function ==
Within a work of fantasy, magic can help to advance the plot, often providing power to heroes or to their opponents. The use of magic frequently manifests itself in a transformation of a character, if not the transformation of the fictional world.

Fictional magic may or may not include a detailed magic system, but it is not uncommon for authors to omit details or explanations of certain limitations, ostensibly for pacing or other purposes; in these cases, it is possible that magic serves more as a convenience to the author rather than as a device for the character.

In nearly any given fantasy magical system, magical ability is limited. Limitations can add conflict to the story and prevent characters from becoming all-powerful with magic, although characters with unlimited power (such as deities or transcendental beings) are not unheard of in fiction. Fantasy writers use a variety of techniques to limit the magic in their stories, such as limiting the number of spells a character has or may cast before needing rest, restricting a character's magic to the use of a specific object, limiting magic to the use of certain rare materials, or restricting the magic a character can use through its negative consequences.

It's common for magic to be performed through the use of certain words or incantations to cast spells. While many works use this method without offering an explanation for it, others do offer an explanation.

Hard magic is a magic system with specific rules and regulations; a soft magic system is usually much more vague and undefined with a mysterious aspect to it.

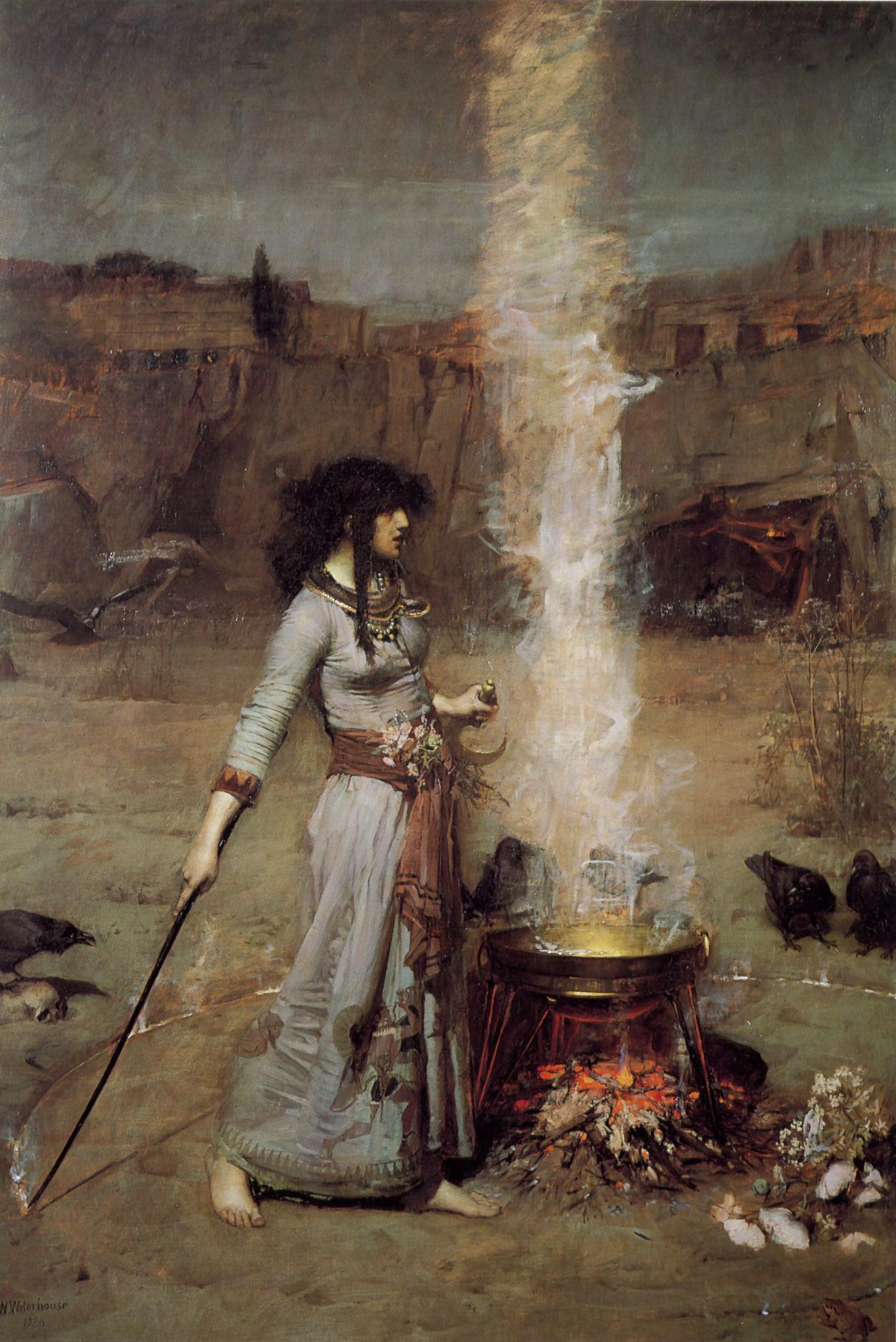
The Magic Circle, 1886 by John William Waterhouse

== Acquisition ==
Authors introduce magic into their stories, and to their characters, in varying ways. Although there is great variation in how spontaneously magic occurs, how difficult it is to wield, and how the guidelines to the magic are implemented, there are a handful of methods for introducing magic found in many fictional works. While some fantasy works such as Hellblazer portray magic as a power gained through a pact with a devil or other spirit (as is traditionally recognized in folklore), others like Harry Potter portray magic as an innate talent, equivalent for example to perfect pitch.

=== Items ===
In some works, such as fairy tales, magic items either endow the main characters with magical powers or have magical powers themselves. Writers often use them as plot devices or MacGuffins to drive the plot of a story.

Wands and staves often feature in fantasy works in the hands of wizards. Italian fairy tales had put wands into the hands of the powerful fairies by the late Middle Ages.

Talismans such as rings or amulets may exert magical influence. Seven-league boots and invisibility cloaks have also proven popular. Many characters are often seen using magic swords or other weapons.

== See also ==
- Magician (fantasy)
- Magic (Discworld)
- Magic in the Earthsea series
- Magic in the Harry Potter series
- Magic (Middle-earth), in the works of J. R. R. Tolkien
- Magic of Dungeons & Dragons
- Magic in video games
