= Giovanni Stefano Marucelli =

Italian painter

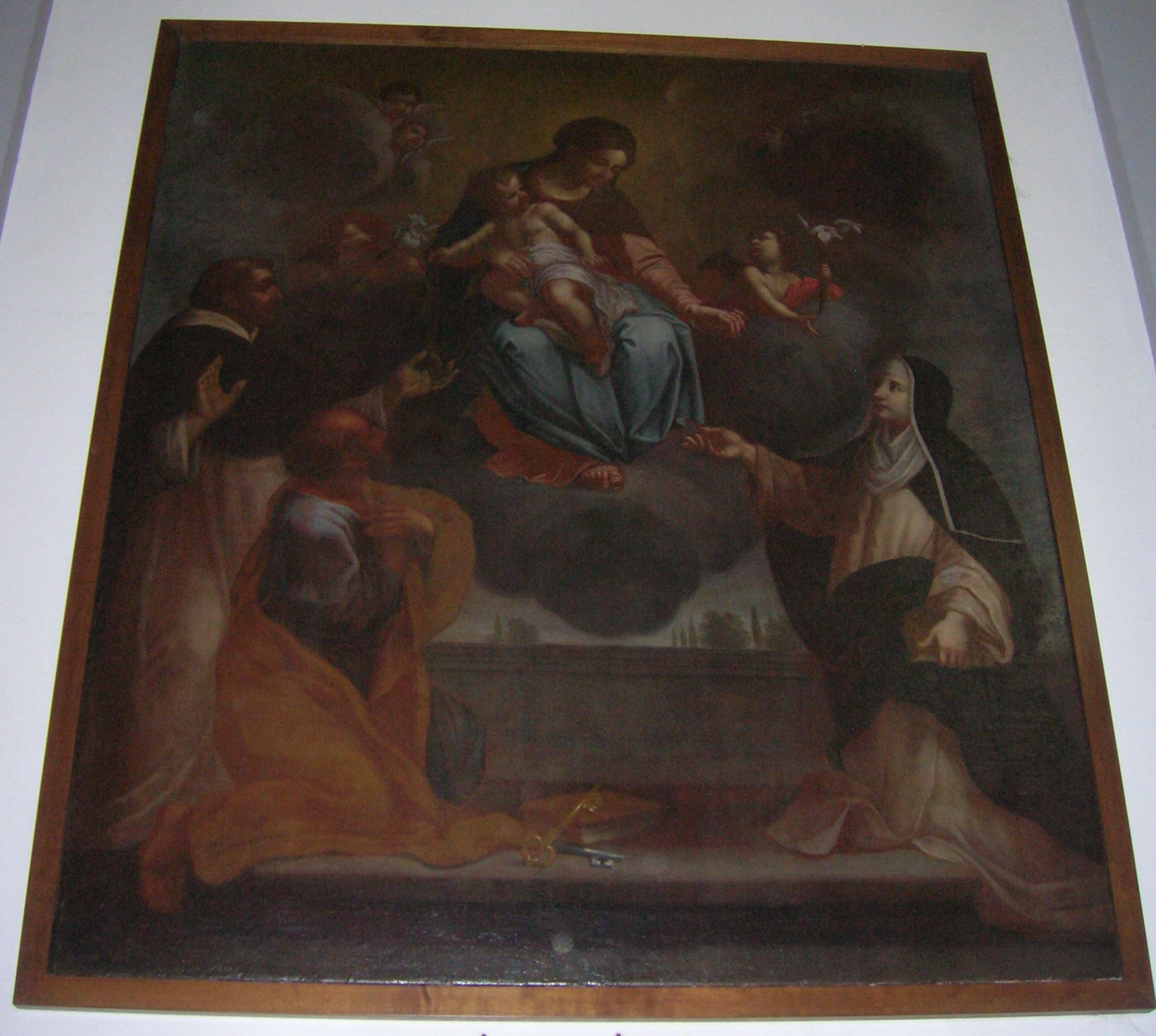
Giovanni Stefano Marucelli, Madonna del Carmelo with the Bambino and Saints Catherine, Peter & Dominic, Uliveto Terme

Giovanni Stefano Marucelli (1586 – c. 1646) was an Italian painter and architect of the Baroque period, active in Tuscany, including Florence and Pisa.

His name is also written as Maruscelli, Maruscielli, or Marscelli. Born in Florence, around 1600 he became a pupil of Andrea Boscoli in Pisa.

His masterpiece is the Abraham and the angels (1628) in the apse of the Duomo di Pisa. He also painted an Ascencion for the church of the Sacrament in Pistoia; San Carlo Borromeo before a crucifix in the first altar to the right of the church of San Torpe, Pisa; a Coronation of the Virgin in the left chapel of the church of San Nicola, Pisa; St. George and St. Francis in adoration for the church of Santi Quirico e Giulitta in Lugnano; Madonna del Carmelo with the Bambino and Saints Catherine, Peter & Dominic and a Madonna with child and four saints in the church of the Santissima Annunziata in Uliveto Terme. In 1622, he painted an altarpiece depicting the Ascension of Christ (1622) for the Bronconi family altar in the church of San Leone, Pistoia.

As an architect, he helped reconstruct the Palazzo dell'Orologio in Pisa.
