= Caprona (disambiguation) =

Caprona is a subgenus of butterflies.

Caprona may also refer to:

- Caprona (island), a fictitious place
- The Magicians of Caprona, a 1980 Diana Wynne Jones book
- Caprona, Vicopisano, a village in the province of Pisa, Italy
