= San Giovanni alla Vena =

- Frazione
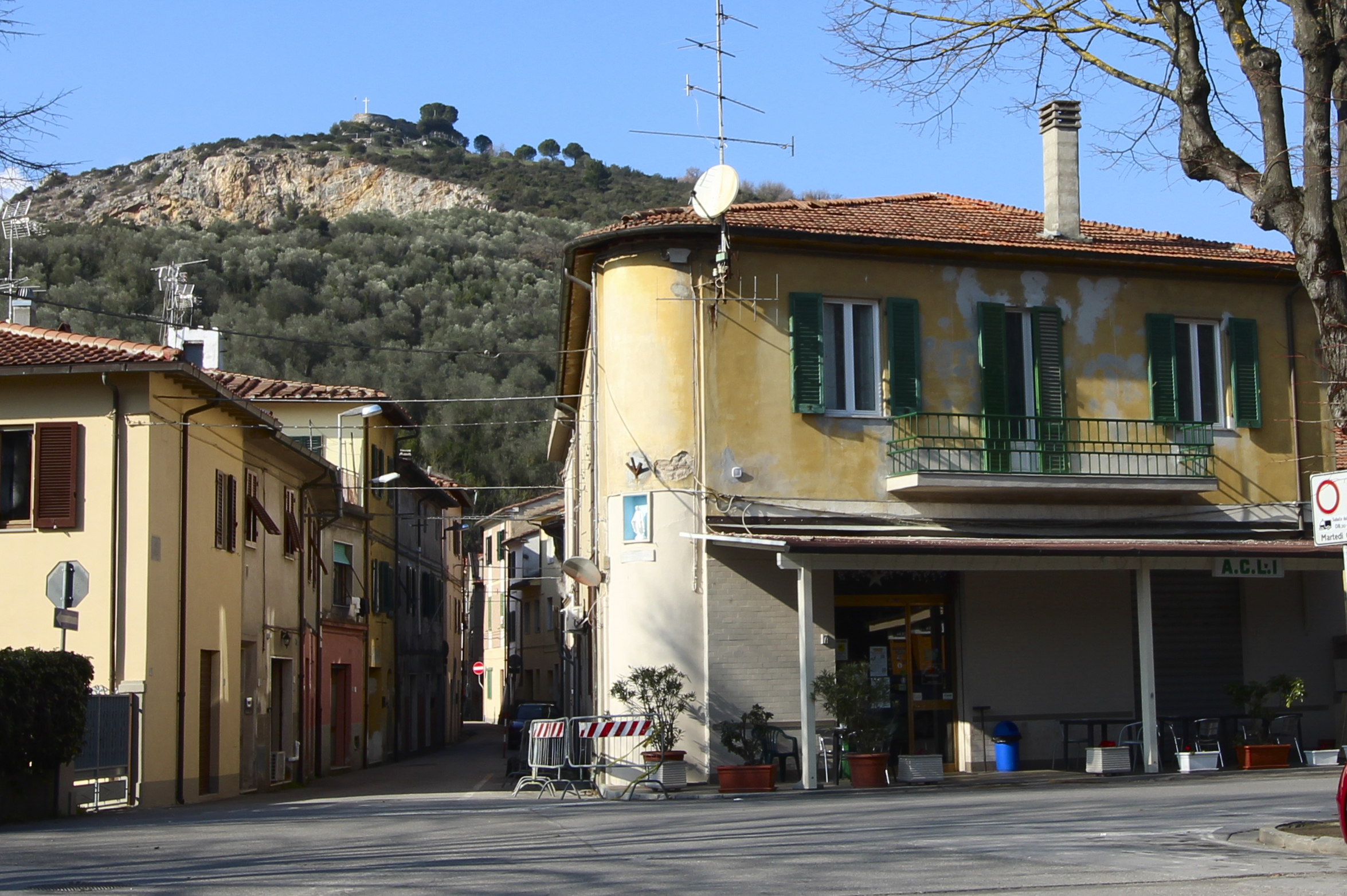

- Location of San Giovanni alla Vena in Italy
- Coordinates: 43°41′3″N 10°34′26″E
- Country: Italy
- Region: Tuscany
- Province: Pisa (PI)
- Comune: Vicopisano
- Elevation: 11 m (36 ft)

Population
  - Total: 2,250
- Time zone: UTC+1 (CET)
  - Summer (DST): UTC+2 (CEST)
- Postal code: 56010
- Dialing code: (+39) 050

San Giovanni alla Vena is a village in Tuscany, central Italy, administratively a frazione of the comune of Vicopisano, province of Pisa. At the time of the 2006 parish census its population was 2,250.

San Giovanni alla Vena is about 20 km from Pisa and 3 km from Vicopisano.
