= Noce, Vicopisano =

Noce
- Frazione
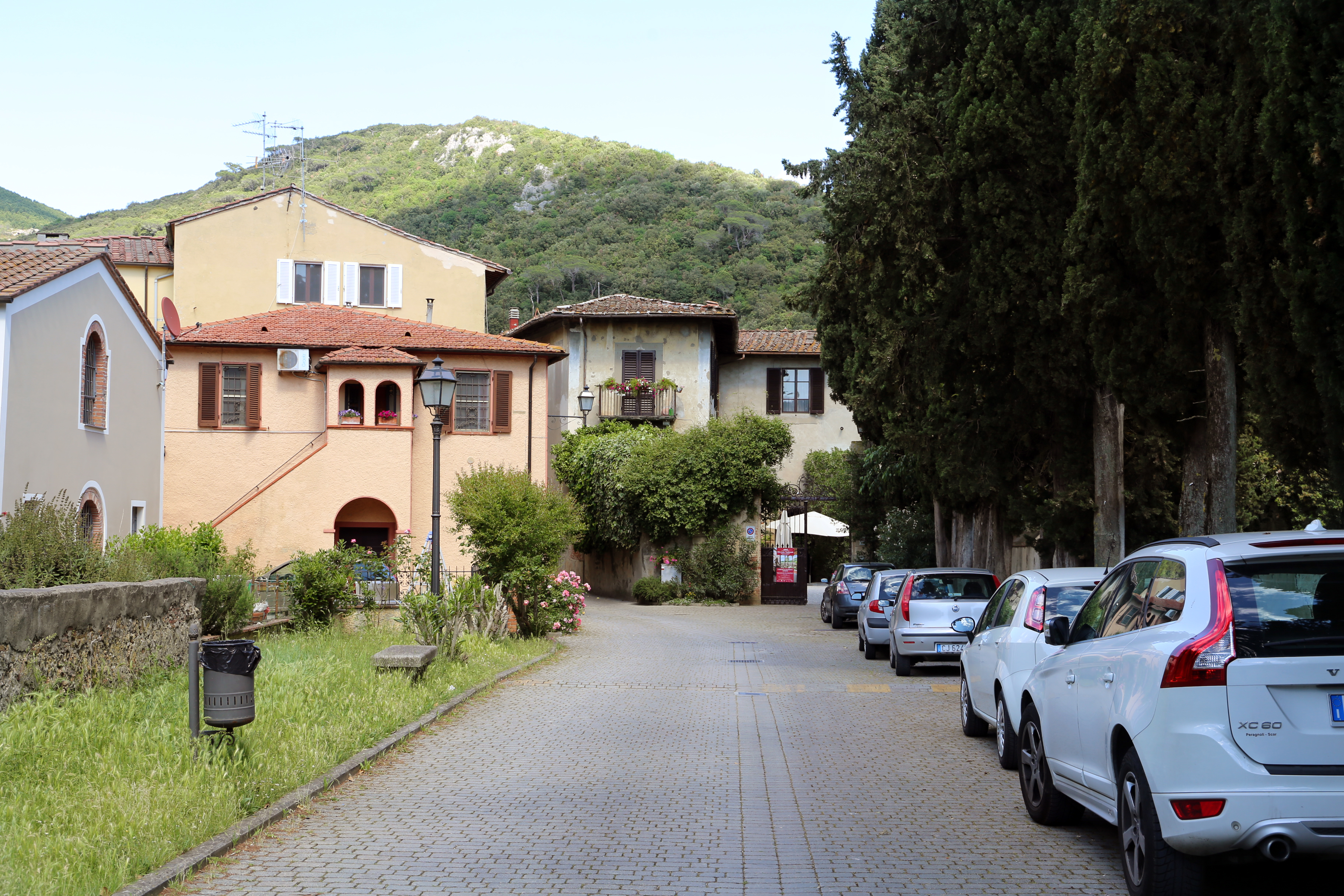

- Location of Noce in Italy
- Coordinates: 43°41′26″N 10°31′59″E
- Country: Italy
- Region: Tuscany
- Province: Pisa (PI)
- Comune: Vicopisano
- Elevation: 9 m (30 ft)

Population (2001)
  - Total: 77
- Time zone: UTC+1 (CET)
  - Summer (DST): UTC+2 (CEST)
- Postal code: 56010
- Dialing code: (+39) 050

Noce is a village in Tuscany, central Italy, administratively a frazione of the comune of Vicopisano, province of Pisa. At the time of the 2001 census its population was 77.

Noce is about 14 km from Pisa and 6 km from Vicopisano.
