= Palazzo delle Vedove =

Palace of the Widows
- Palazzo delle Vedove
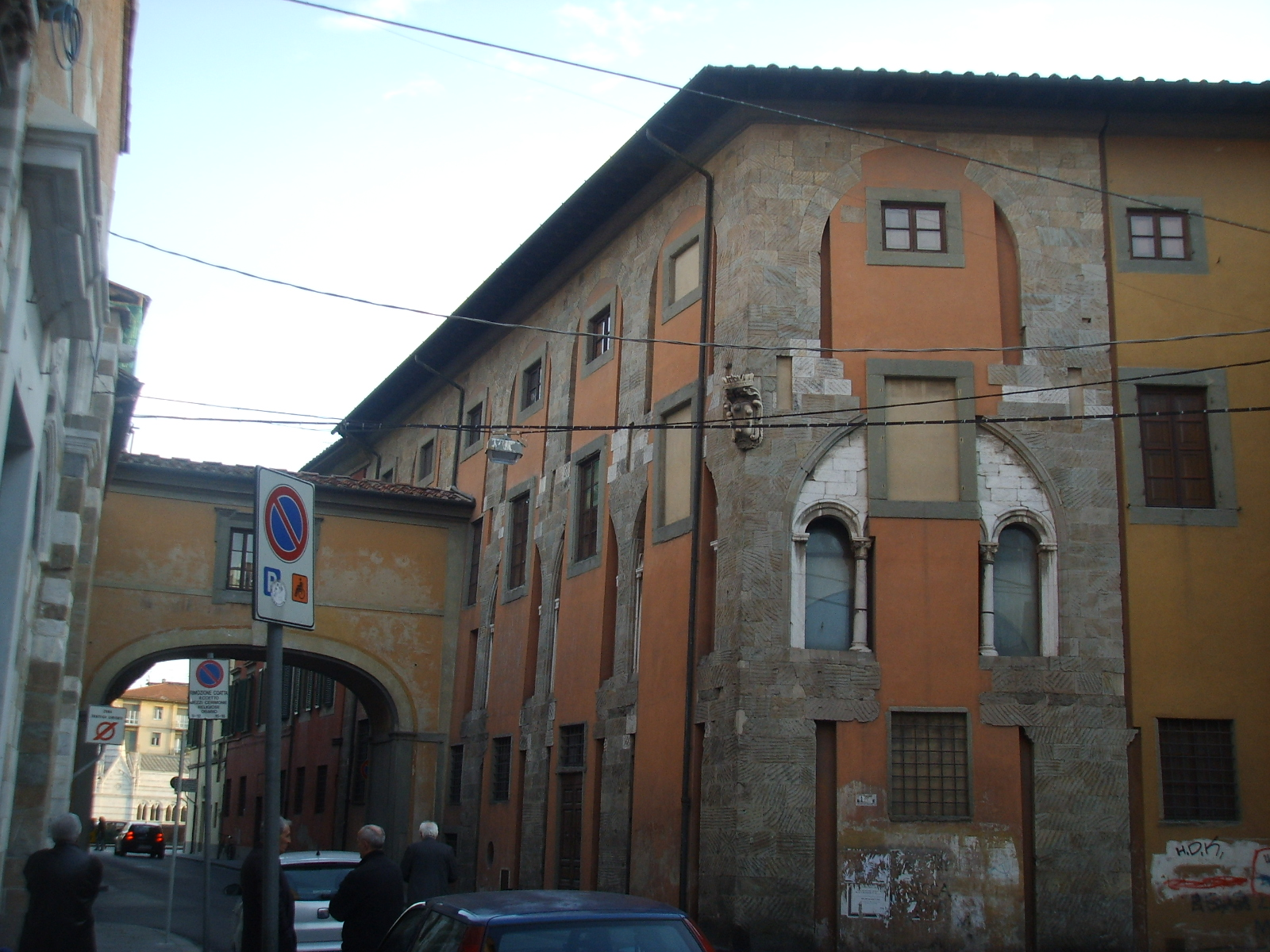
- Palazzo delle Vedove

- Location within Italy
- Alternative names: Palace of the Widows

General information
- Type: Palace
- Location: Via Santa Maria, 71, 56126 Pisa PI, Italy
- Coordinates: 43°42′59.67″N 10°23′45.73″E

The Palazzo delle Vedove (Italian for Widows' Palace) is a palace in Pisa, Tuscany, Italy.

The palace, built in the 12th–14th centuries, is sited land which in antique times was the domus of the Bocci family of Pisa. Detail of the medieval edifice can still be seen in the exterior, including a marble quadruple mullioned window partially covered by a rectangular window. On one of the sides was once a portico.

The palace was largely renovated in the 16th century and was subsequently used to house the "widows" of the Medici family. Two covered passages connected the edifice to the Torre De Cantone and then to the church of San Nicola, where the gentlewomen could attend the mass without passing in the streets.
