= San Nicola, Pisa =

Church in Pisa, Italy

Coordinates: 43.71664°N 10.39671°E

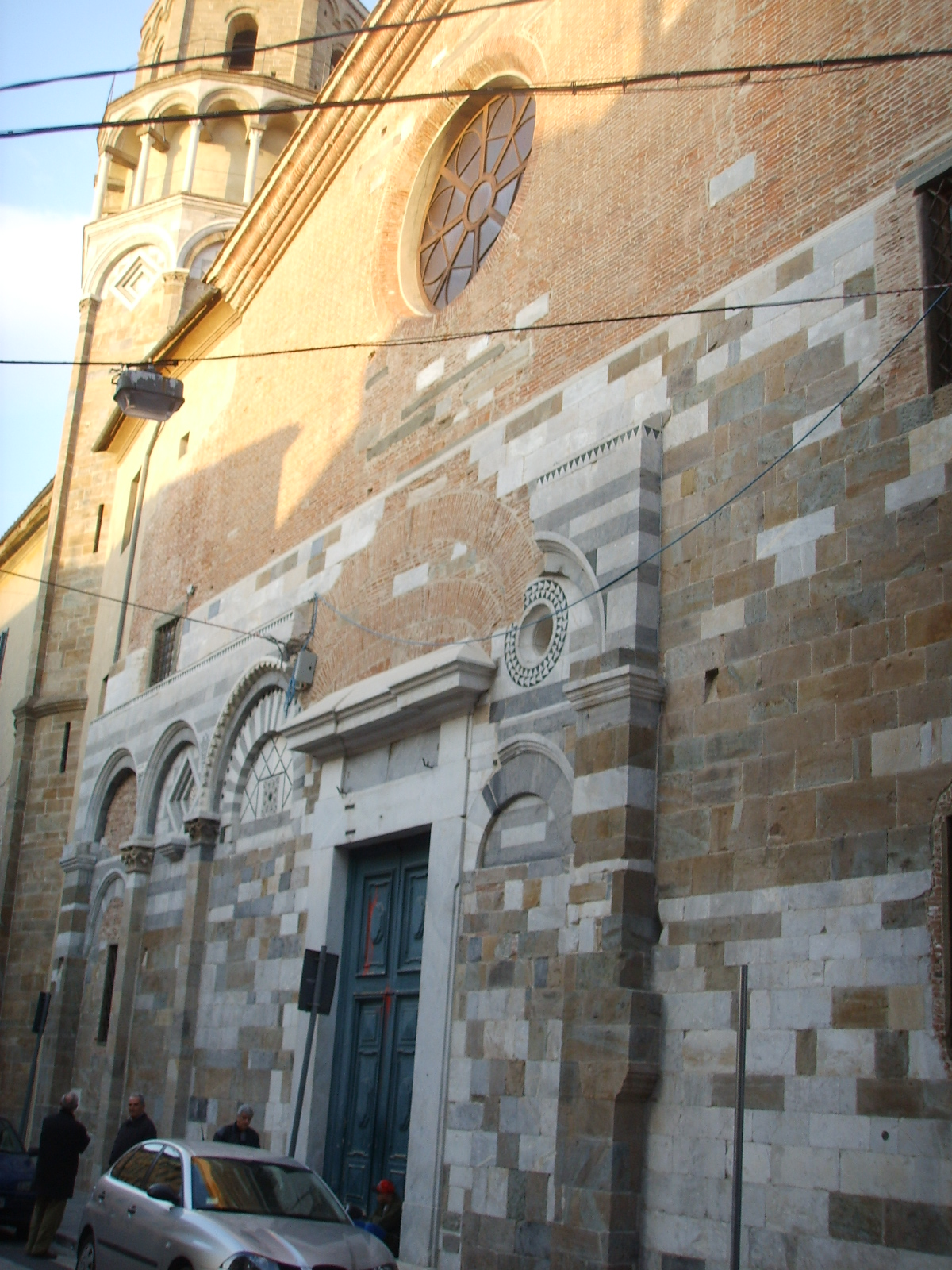
Remains of the façade.

San Nicola is a church in Pisa, Tuscany, Italy.

== Church ==
San Nicola is mentioned for the first time, together with the annexed convent, in 1097. In 1297–1313 the Augustinians enlarged it, perhaps under design by Giovanni Pisano (eastern side). In the 17th century the edifice was restored with the addition of altars and the Sacrament Chapel by Matteo Nigetti (1614).

The façade features pilaster strips, blind arches and lozenges, and is decorated with 12th century intarsia. The interior houses the panels of Madonna with Child (by Matteo Traini, 14th century) and of St. Nicholas Saving Pisa from the Plague (15th century), canvases by Giovanni Stefano Marucelli and Giovanni Biliverti, a Crucifix by Giovanni Pisano, a Madonna with Child by Nino Pisano and an Annunciation by Francesco di Valdambrino.

A covered passage connects the church to the Torre De Cantone and, from it, to the Palazzo delle Vedove: it was used by the Medici gentlewoman residing in the latter to reach the church without walking in the streets.

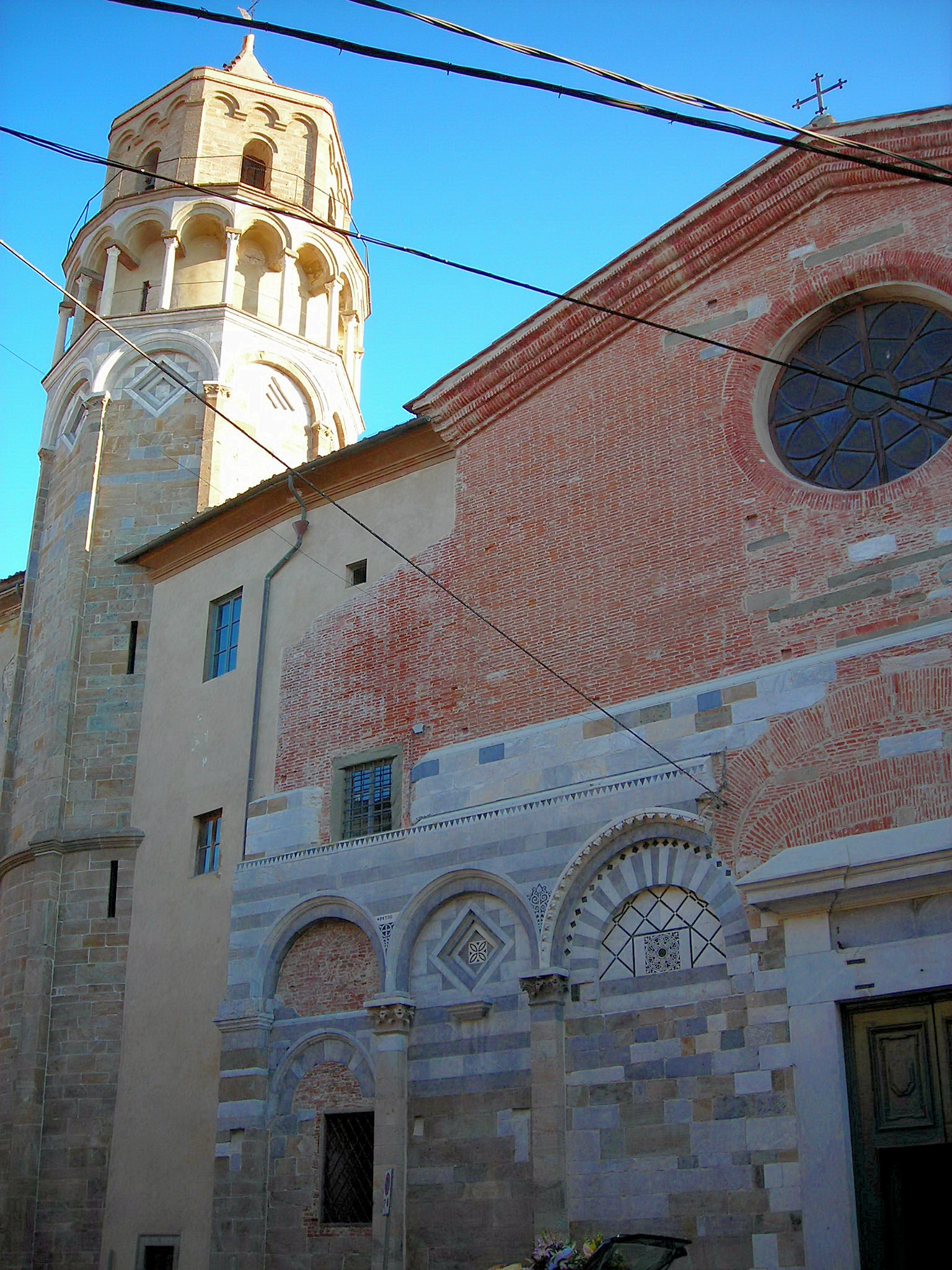
Bell tower and façade

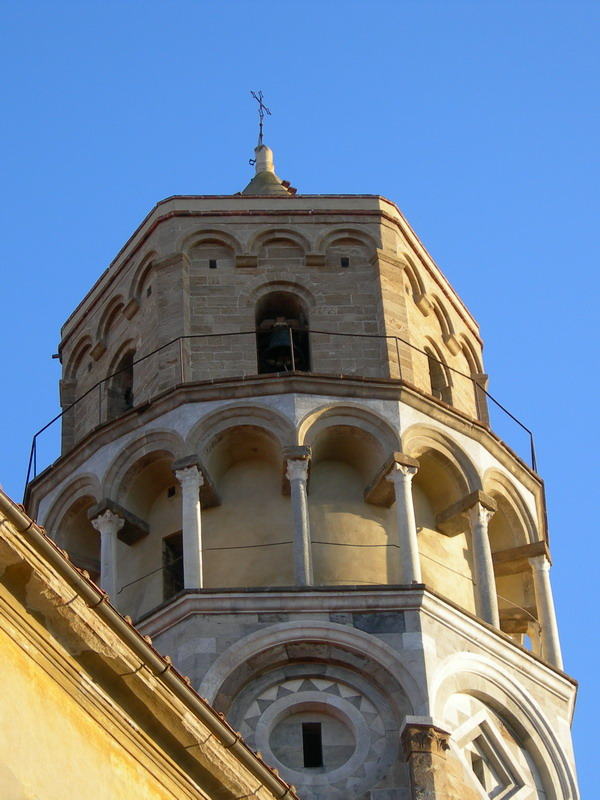
Top of the bell tower.

== Bell tower ==
The octangular bell tower, the second most famous in the city after the Leaning Tower, most likely dates to 1170. There is no proof, but, as in the case of its other more famous counterpart, the architect seems to be Diotisalvi. Originally it was separated from the nearby buildings. It is also slightly tilting; the base is under the current street level.

The lower part starts at the top of each side with blind arches including lozenges. The bell has instead a good plan, with a single mullioned window on each side, and is surrounded by a gallery with small arches supported by columns. The cusp has a pyramidal shape.

The polychrome effect was obtained by using stones from different locations.
