= Francesco Algarotti =

Italian polymath (1712–1764)

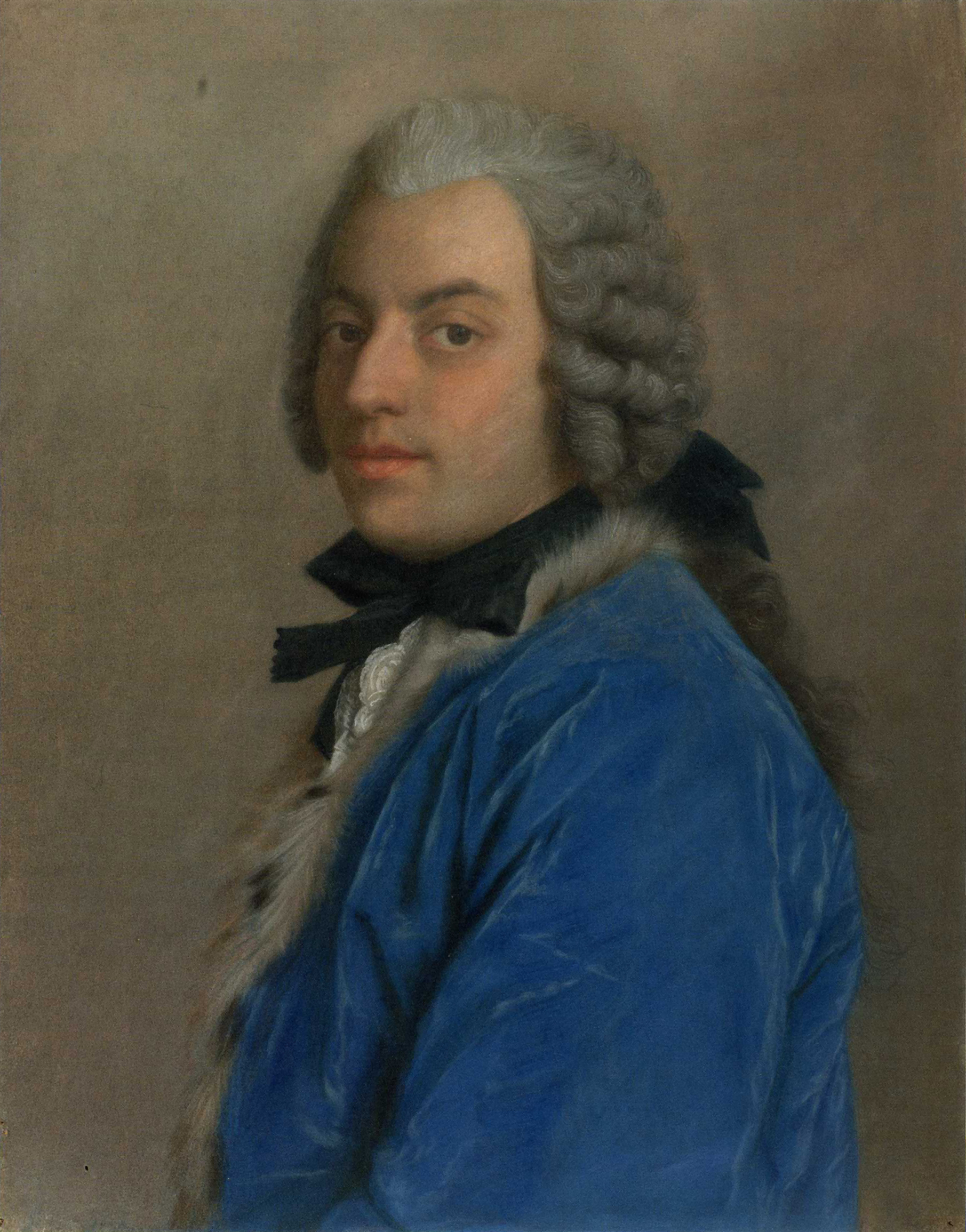
- Portrait by Jean-Étienne Liotard (1745), Rijksmuseum, on parchment
- Born: 11 December 1712; Venice, Republic of Venice
- Died: 3 May 1764 (aged 51); Pisa, Grand Duchy of Tuscany
- Education: Sapienza University of Rome University of Bologna
- Occupation: Philosopher

Count Francesco Algarotti (11 December 1712 – 3 May 1764) was an Italian polymath, active as a philosopher, writer, anglophile, art critic and art collector. He was a man of broad knowledge, an expert in Newtonianism, architecture and opera. He was a friend of Frederick the Great and leading authors of his times: Voltaire, Jean-Baptiste de Boyer, Marquis d'Argens, Pierre-Louis de Maupertuis and the atheist Julien Offray de La Mettrie. Lord Chesterfield, Thomas Gray, George Lyttelton, Thomas Hollis, Metastasio, Benedict XIV and Heinrich von Brühl were among his correspondents.

== Early life ==
Algarotti was born in Venice as the son of a rich merchant. His father and uncle were art collectors. Unlike his older brother, Bonomo he did not step into the company, but decided to become an author. Francesco obtained a classical education. He also studied natural sciences and mathematics at the Rome and experimental physics and medicine at the University of Bologna under Francesco Maria Zanotti who became a lifelong friend. In 1728, he conducted experiments regarding optics. He was educated in his native Venice and in Rome and Bologna.

His youthful curiosity led him to travel extensively, and he visited Paris for the first time in his early 20s. There his urbanity, his brilliant conversation, his good looks, and his versatile intelligence promptly made an impression on such intellectuals as Pierre-Louis Moreau de Maupertuis and Voltaire. Two years later, he was in London, where he was made a fellow of the Royal Society. He became embroiled in a lively bisexual love-triangle with the politician John Hervey, and Lady Mary Wortley Montagu. Algarotti left for Italy and finished his Neutonianismo per le dame ("Newtonism for Ladies") (1737 – dedicated to Bernard le Bovier de Fontenelle) – a work consisting of information on astronomy, physics, mathematics, women and science and education.

== Personal life and career ==
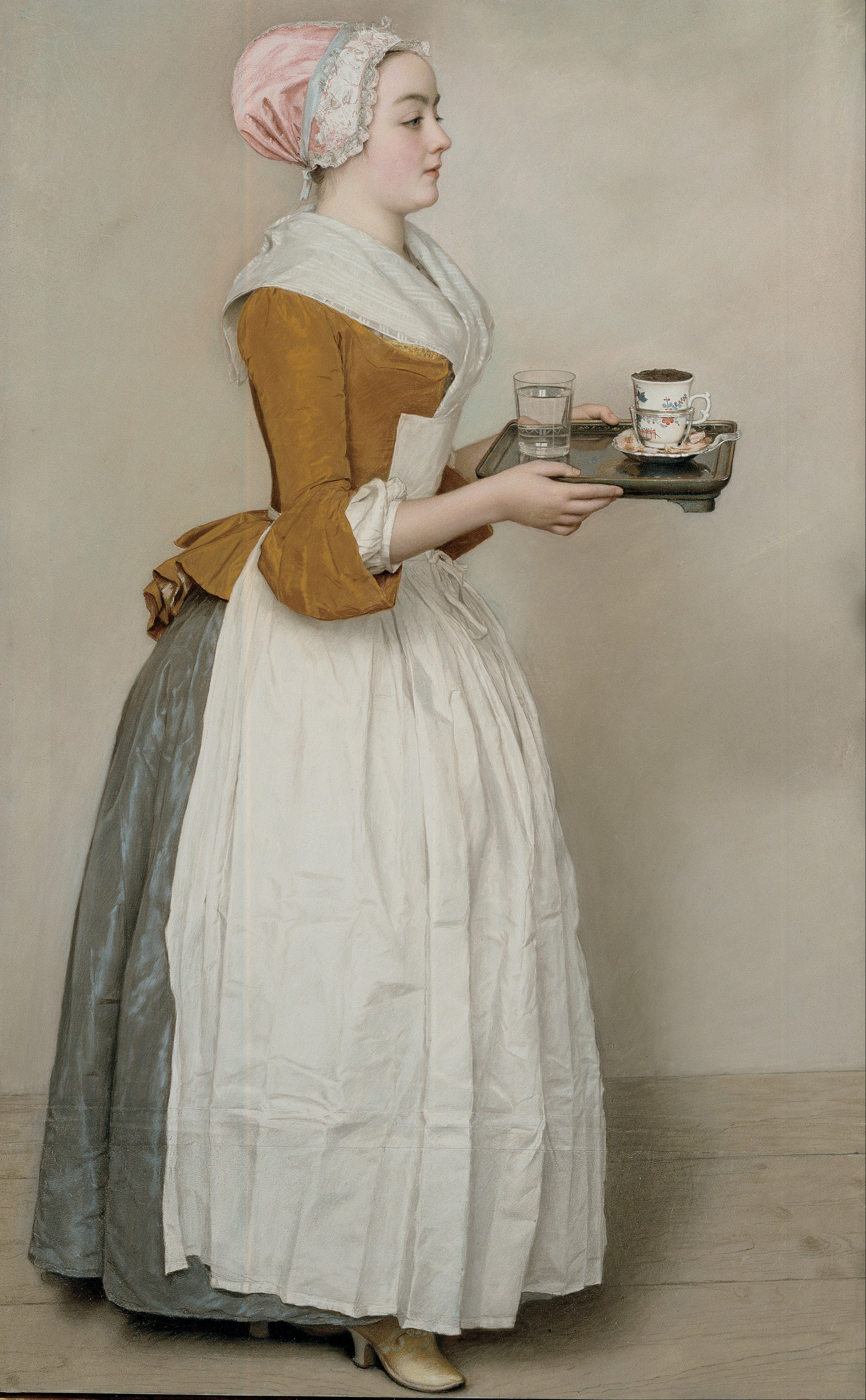
The Chocolate Girl (1743/44). The pastel by Liotard was acquired in 1745 by Algarotti for the Dresden picture gallery.

Algarotti had made acquaintance with Antiochus Kantemir, a Moldavian diplomat, poet and composer. He was invited to visit Russia for the wedding of Duke Anthony Ulrich of Brunswick. In 1739 he left with Lord Baltimore from Sheerness to Newcastle upon Tyne. On their way to Saint Petersburg a heavy storm forced their ship to shelter in Harlingen. Algarotti called Saint Petersburg "the great window ... through which Russia looks into Europe". Returning from Saint Petersburg, they visited Frederick the Great in Rheinsberg. Algarotti had obligations in England and came back the year after. Then Algarotti went together with Frederick to Königsberg where he was crowned.

Frederick, who was impressed with this walking encyclopedia, made him and his brother Bonomo Prussian counts in 1740. Algarotti accompanied Frederick to Bayreuth, Kehl, Strasbourg and Moyland Castle where they met with Voltaire, who was taking baths in Kleve for his health. In 1741 Algarotti went to Turin as his diplomat. Frederick had offered him a salary, but Algarotti refused. First, he went to Dresden and Venice, where he bought 21 paintings, a few by Jean-Étienne Liotard and Giovanni Battista Tiepolo for the court of Augustus III of Poland. Algarotti did not succeed in inducing the Kingdom of Sardinia to launch a treacherous attack upon Austria.

=== Algarotti and the other arts ===
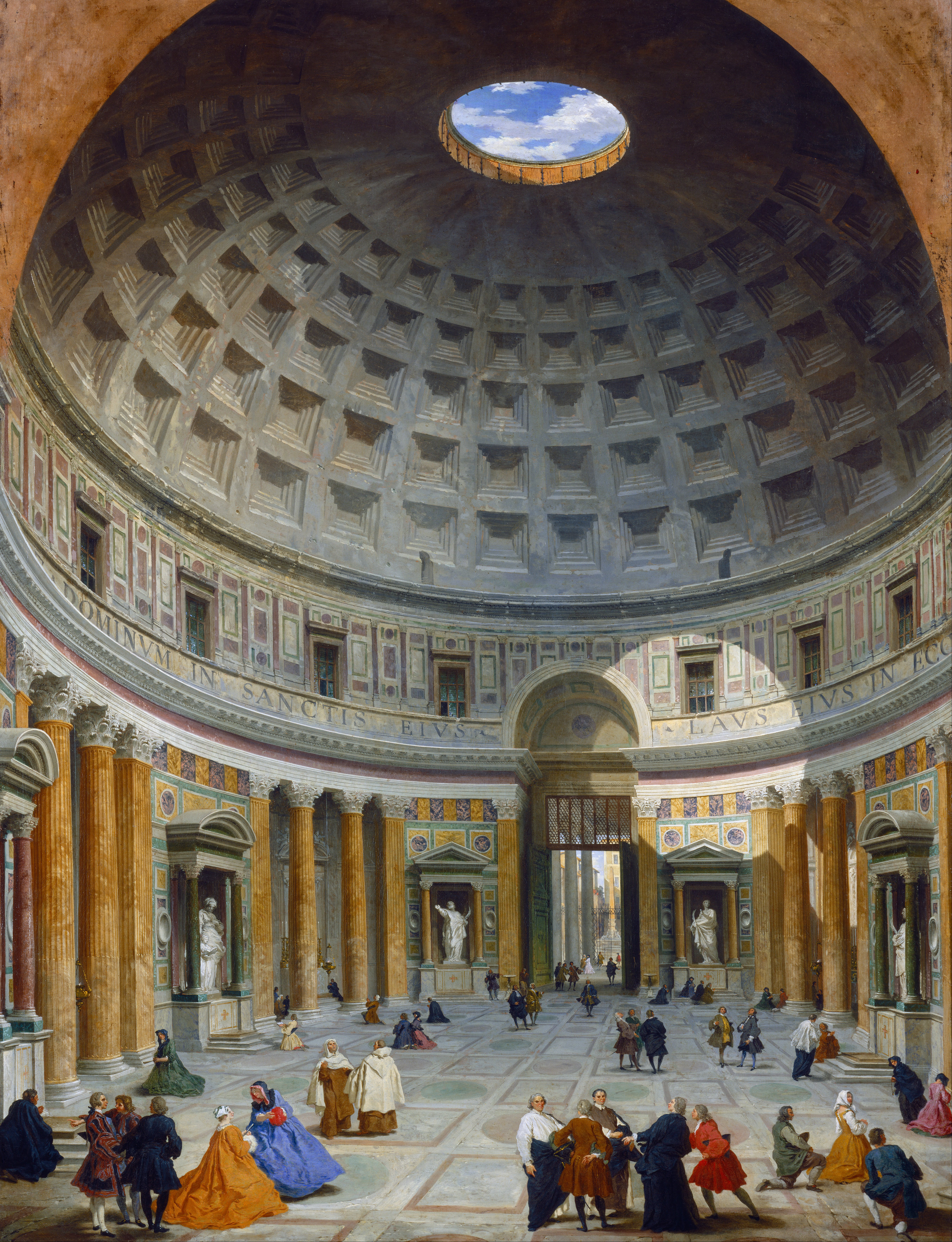
The interior of the Pantheon (Rome) by Giovanni Paolo Pannini, ordered by and belonging to the art collection of Algarotti

Algarotti's choice of works reflects the encyclopedic interests of the Neoclassic era; he was uninterested in developing a single unitary stylistic collection, and envisioned a modern museum, a catalog of styles from across the ages. For contemporary commissions, he wrote up a list of paintings he recommended commissioning, including history paintings from Tiepolo, Pittoni, and Piazzetta; scenes with animals from Castiglione, and veduta with ruins from Pannini. He wanted "suggetti graziosi e leggeri" from Balestra, Boucher, and Donato Creti. Other artists he supported were Giuseppe Nogari, Bernardo Bellotto, and Francesco Pavona.

In 1747 Algarotti went back to Potsdam and became court chamberlain, but left to visit the archeological diggings at Herculaneum. In 1749 he moved to Berlin. Algarotti was involved in finishing the architectural designs of Georg Wenzeslaus von Knobelsdorff who had fallen ill. In February 1753, after several years residing in Prussia, he returned to Italy, living most of the time in Bologna, where he was friendly with Laura Bassi, the first salaried female teacher in a university. In 1759 Algarotti was involved in a new opera-style in the city of Parma. He influenced Guillaume du Tillot and the Duke of Parma.

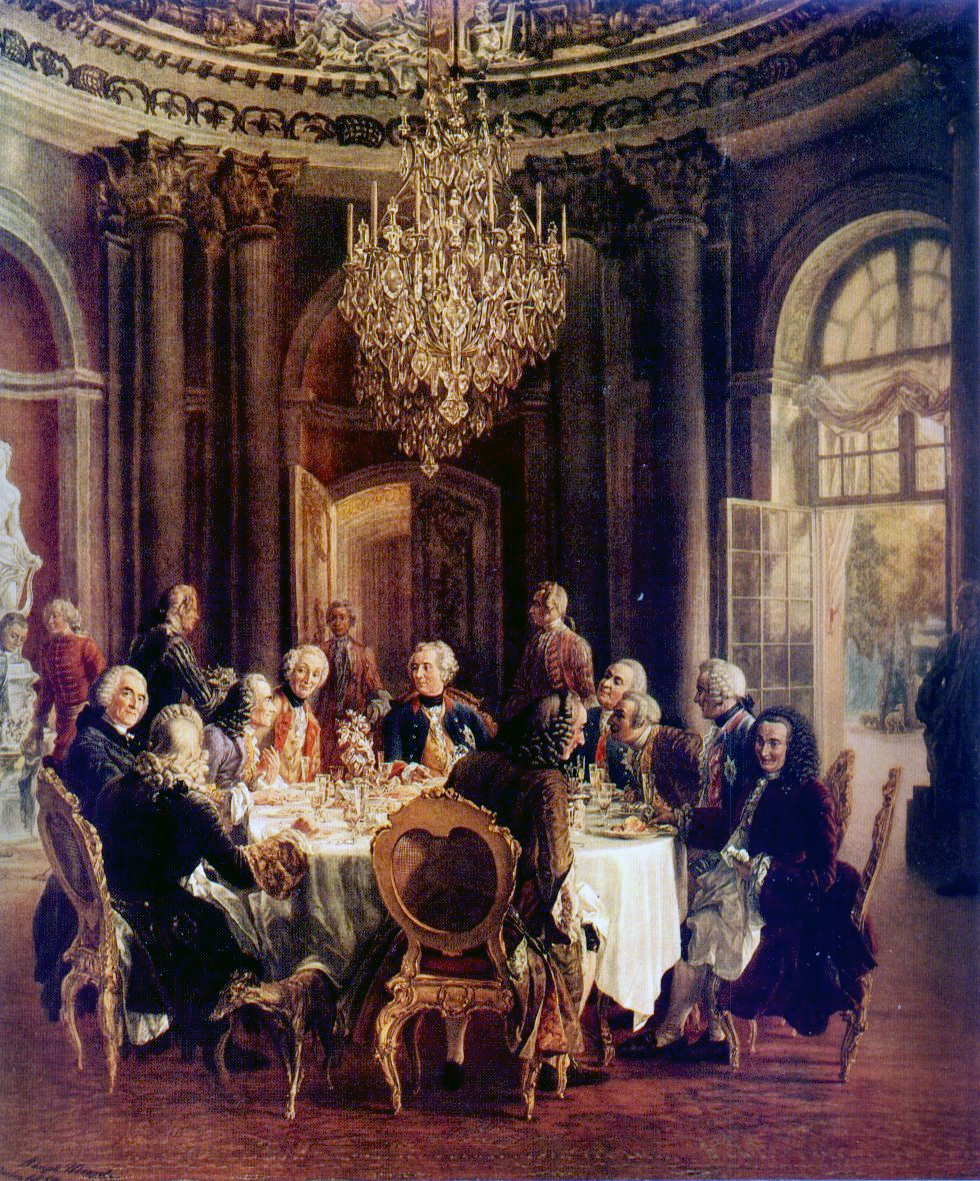
Gathering on Sanssouci in the Marble Hall, with Frederick II. (the Great) of Prussia, Voltaire, d'Argens, La Mettrie, James Keith, George Keith, Friedrich Rudolf von Rothenburg, Christoph Ludwig von Stille, and Algarotti. The painting was lost in 1945.

Algarotti's Essay on the Opera (1755) was a major influence on the librettist Carlo Innocenzo Frugoni and the composer Tommaso Traetta, and in the development of Gluck's reformist ideology. Algarotti proposed a heavily simplified model of opera seria, with the drama pre-eminent, instead of the music, ballet or staging. The drama itself should "delight the eyes and ears, to rouse up and to affect the hearts of an audience, without the risk of sinning against reason or common sense." Algarotti's ideas influenced both Gluck and his librettist Calzabigi, writing their Orfeo ed Euridice.

In 1762 Algarotti moved to Pisa, where he died of tuberculosis. Frederick the Great, who several times had needed Algarotti for writing texts in Latin, sent in a text for a monument to his memory on the Campo Santo.

== Works ==
- Bibliography and Inventory of all known letters at Algarotti Briefdatenbank der Universitätsbibliothek Trier (in French)
- Correspondence with Frederick the Great at Digitale Ausgabe der Universitätsbibliothek Trier (in French)
- Il newtonianismo per le dame, 1737. The International Centre for the History of Universities and Science (CIS), University of Bologna
- "Saggio sopra la pittura"
- "An essay on architecture" (1753).
- "Letters military and political" (1782).
- "Essai sur la durée des règnes des sept rois de Rome"
- "Essai sur l'empire des Incas"
- Algarotti, Francesco (1783). The modern art of love; or The congress of Cythera. Translated by Calamo Ludimus. London: G. Kearsley.
- Algarotti, Francesco (1739). Sir Isaac Newton's Philosophy Explained for the use of Ladies, in six dialogues on Light and Colours. Vol. I. E. Cave, St. John's-Gate, London.
- Algarotti, Francesco (1764). Saggio sopra la pittura. Livorno: Presso Marco Coltellini.
- Algarotti, Francesco (1756). Saggio del Conte Algarotti sull'Architettura e sulla Pittura. Milan: Societa Tipografica de' classici Italiani.
- Algarotti, Francesco (1755). Saggio sopra L'Opera in Musica. Ex donat. Molliana.

== Gallery ==
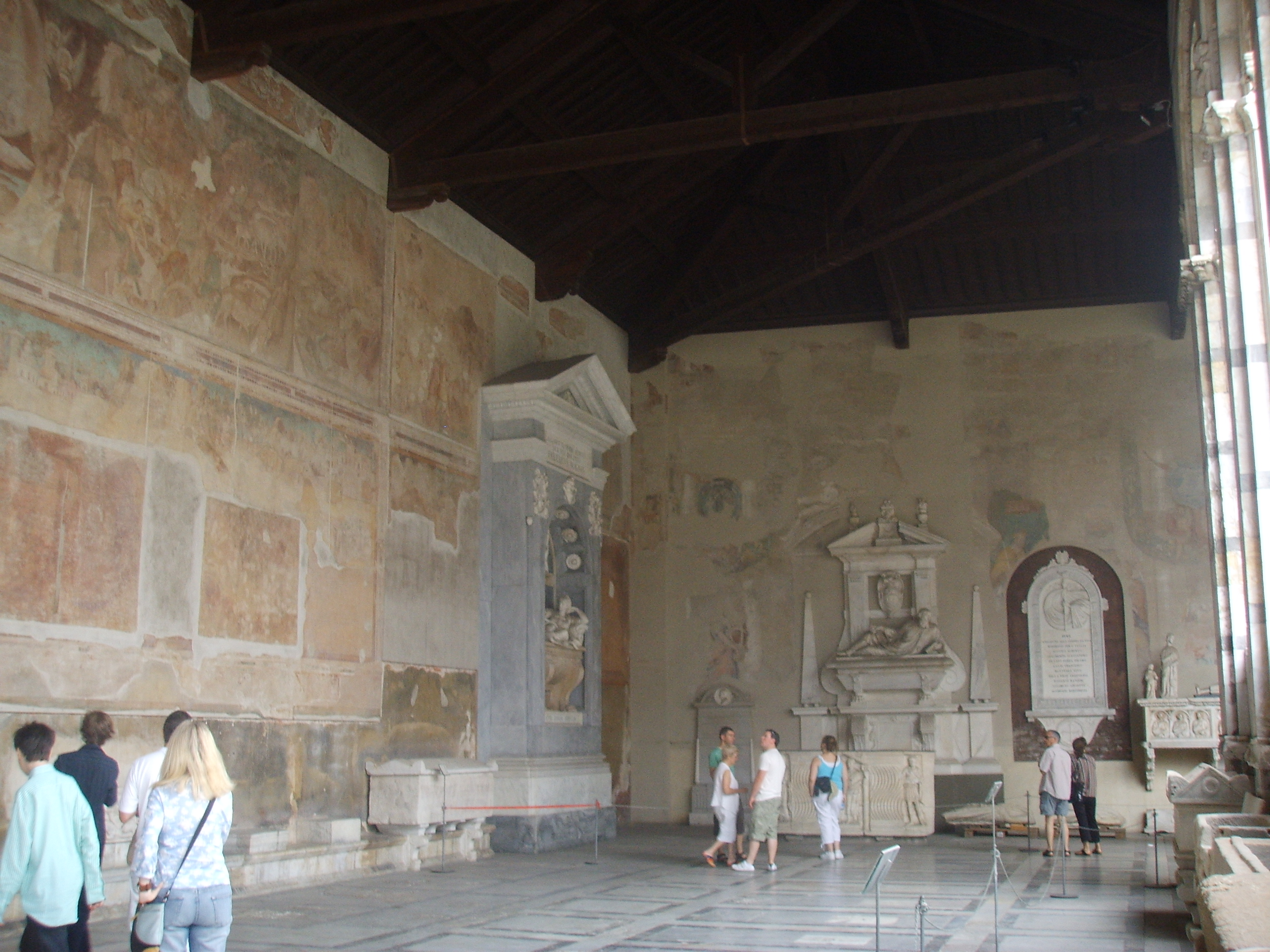
Algarotti tombstone on the left in neo-classical style

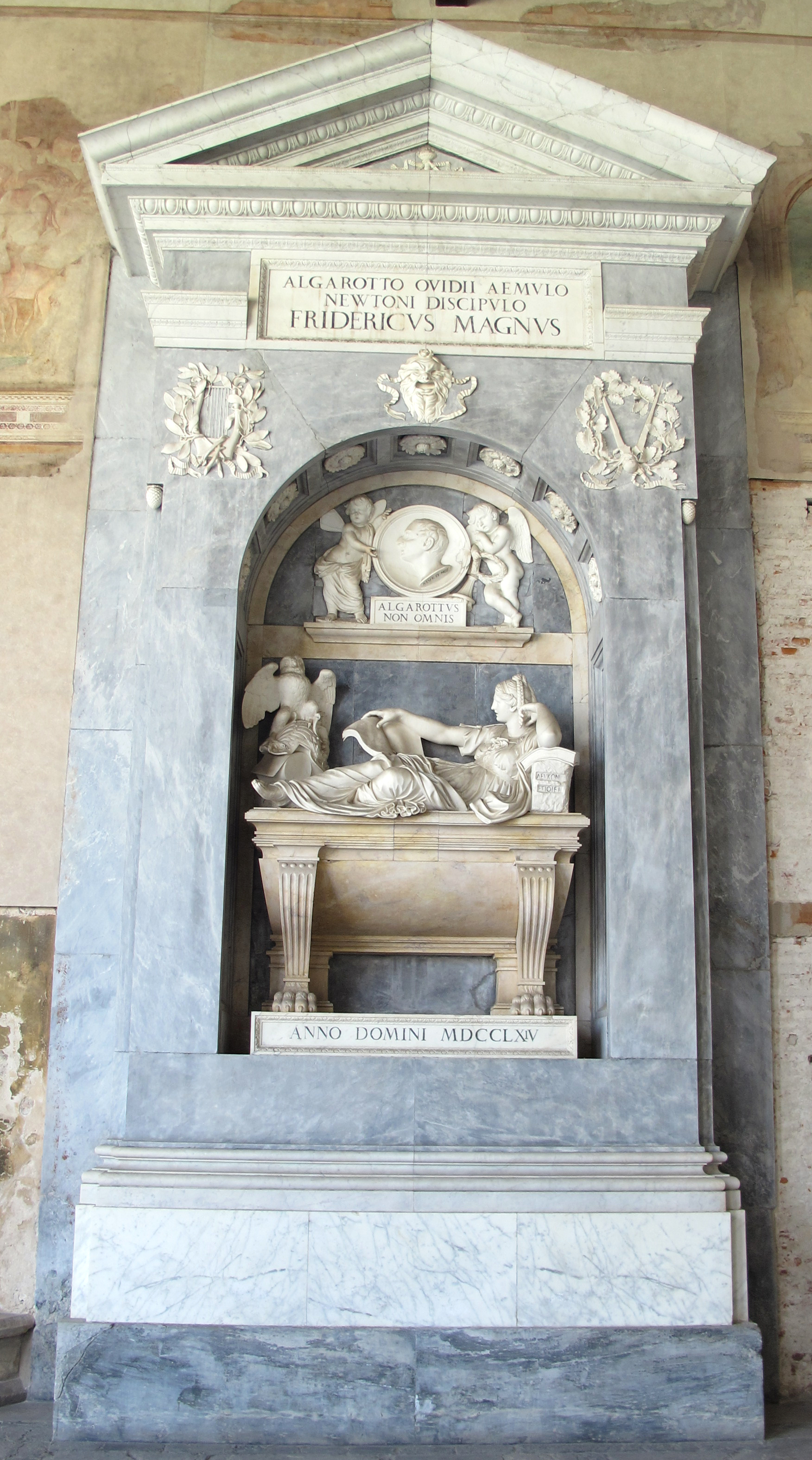
Tomb of Algarotti in Camposanto di Pisa, designed by Mauro Antonio Tesi and Giovanni Antonio Cibei.

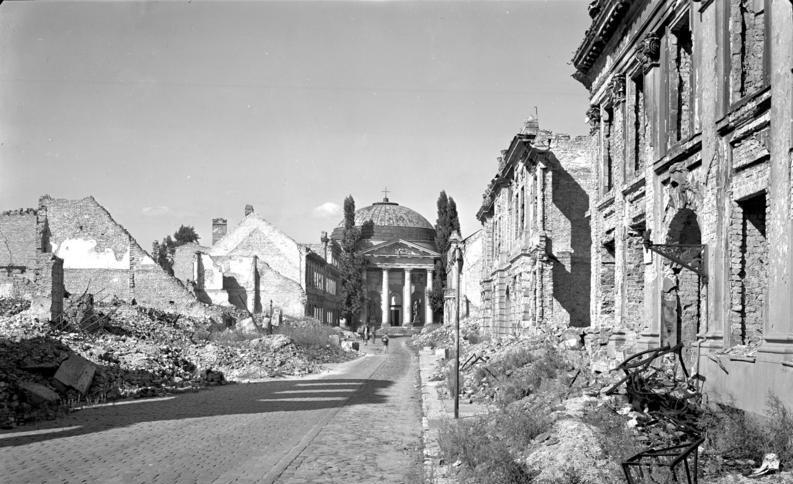
Algarotti was involved in the design of the Französische Kirche in Potsdam; picture taken just after the war.

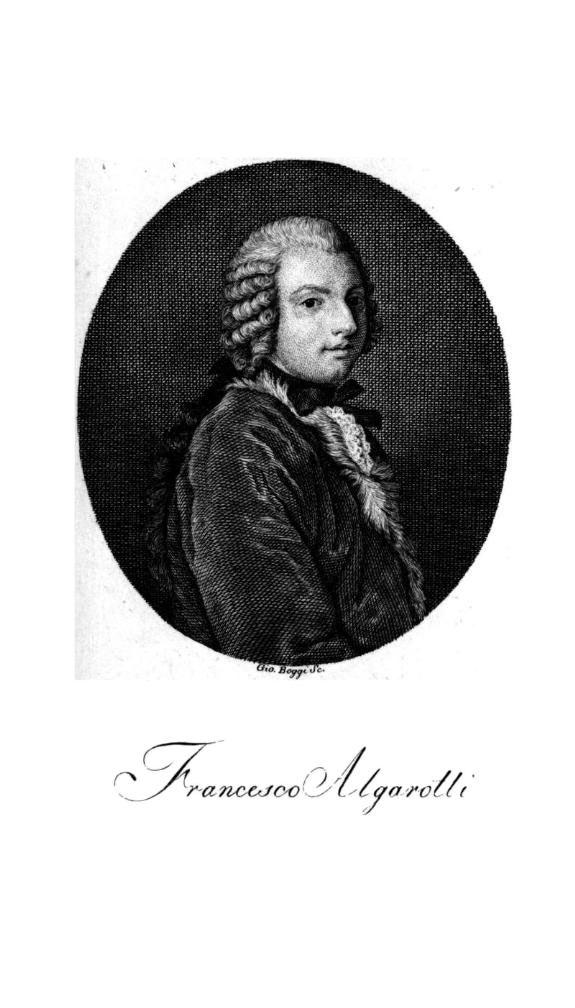
Francesco Algarotti by Giovanni Boggi, who copied a portrait by J. É. Liotard

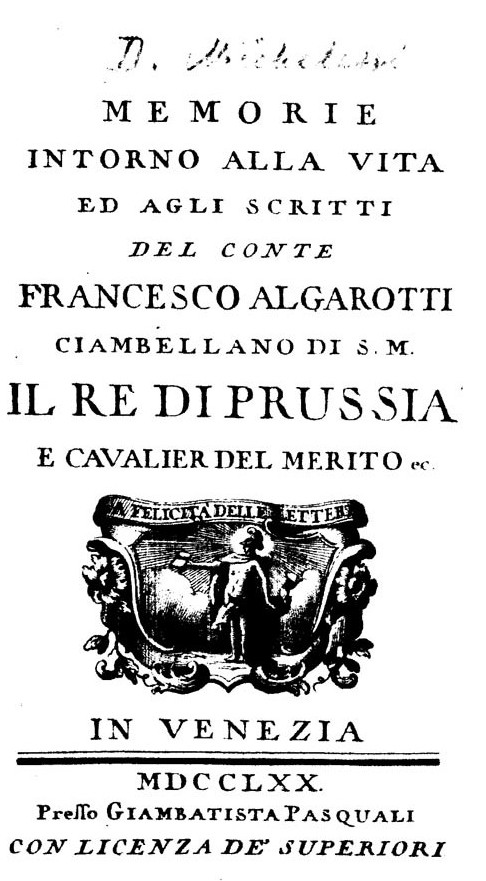
Domenico Michelessi, Memorie intorno alla vita e agli scritti del conte Francesco Algarotti, 1770

Saggi, 1963 (Italian, full text)

== Sources ==
- Chisholm, Hugh, ed. (1911). "Algarotti, Francesco, Count" . Encyclopædia Britannica. Vol. 1 (11th ed.). Cambridge University Press. pp. 598–599.
- Haskell, Francis (1993). "Chapter 14". Patrons and Painters: Art and Society in Baroque Italy. 1980. Yale University Press. pp. 347–360.
- Laura Favero Carraro. "Francesco Algarotti". The Literary Encyclopedia. Ed. Robert Clark, Emory Elliott and Janet Todd.
- MacDonogh, G. (1999) Frederick the Great. New York: St. Martin's Griffin
- Orrey, Leslie; Milnes, Rodney (1987). Opera, a concise history. London: Thames and Hudson. ISBN 0-500-20217-6.
- Occhipinti, C. Piranesi, Mariette, Algarotti. Percorsi settecenteschi nella cultura figurativa europea. Roma, UniversItalia, 2013. ISBN 978-88-6507-459-6
- Stanford University Databases
- Frieder von Ammon, Jörg Krämer, Florian Mehltretter (eds.): Oper der Aufklärung – Aufklärung der Oper. Francesco Algarottis "Saggio Sopra L'Opera in Musica" im Kontext. Mit einer kommentierten Edition der 5. Fassung des "Saggio" und ihrer Übersetzung durch Rudolf Erich Raspe. Berlin/Boston: De Gruyter 2017, ISBN 978-3-11-054209-7.
