= San Leone, Pistoia =

Roman Catholic church in Tuscany, Italy

Coordinates: 43°55′57″N 10°55′05″E

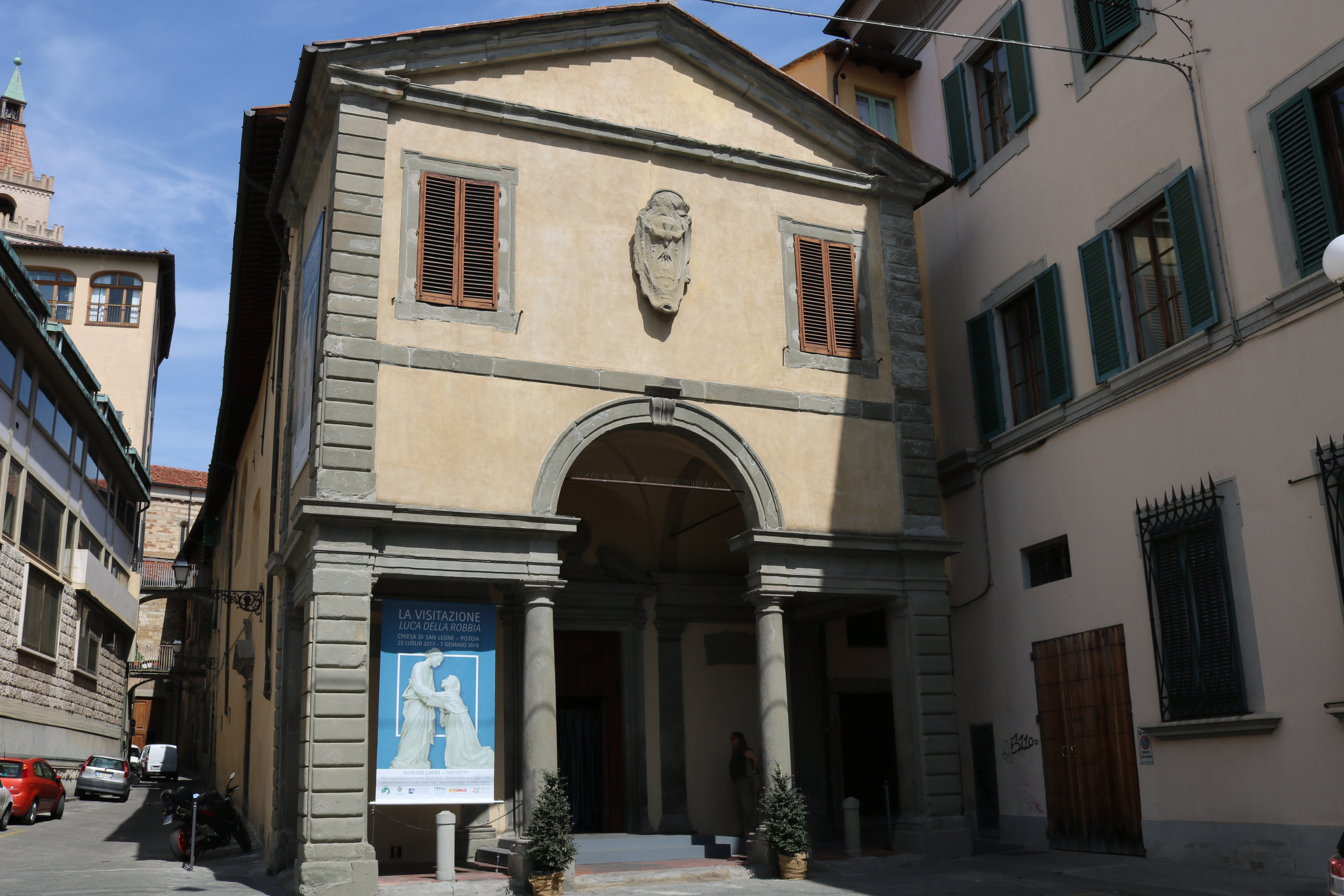
Facade of San Leone

San Leone, once called the oratory or church of Santo Spirito, is a small Baroque-style Roman Catholic church located adjacent to the Vivarelli Colonna (now provincial offices) in Pistoia, region of Tuscany, Italy. In 2017, restoration of the Baroque era frescoes in the apse and ceilings were completed.

== History ==
The site by the 13th century housed an oratory of the prominent Congregation of the Holy Spirit (Santo Spirito). That congregation and the oratory were patronized by the wealthy aristocratic Cancellieri Bianchi family, who owned the adjacent Palazzo, now serving as provincial office. However, during the early 16th century, this family had joined the anti-Medici party in Tuscany, and with the restoration of the latter family to the rule in the region, the Cancellieri palaces in town, as well as their fortunes, suffered extremely. The adjacent palace was burned down by forces led by the Panciatichi family. The oratory remained property of the Congregation.

The oratory was refurbished in the 17th century, adding the portico and laminating the interior with marble and quadratura. During this time, the interiors were embellished with the altarpieces (1622) depicting: on the right the Resurrection by Giovanni Lanfranco for the Arfaruoli family and on left the Ascension of Christ by Stefano Marucelli for the Bronconi family. During 1753–1764, the apse and presbytery dome were decorated initially starting with Raffaello Ulivi, but mostly with the efforts of Vincenzo Meucci and Lorenzo del Moro with a large fresco depicting the Descent of the Holy Spirit. Moro contributed to the quadratura and lateral walls. In 1764, Mauro Tesi completed the nave ceiling frescoes. Between 1710 and 1773, the oratory was detached from the Congregation of Santo Spirito and granted to the bishop's seminary, who changed the dedication to San Leone.

In 2017, the church interiors underwent restoration, and the Luca della Robbia terracotta sculpture of the Visitation, originally from San Giovanni Fuorcivitas was displayed in the oratory. The church remains property of the Diocese.

== Gallery ==
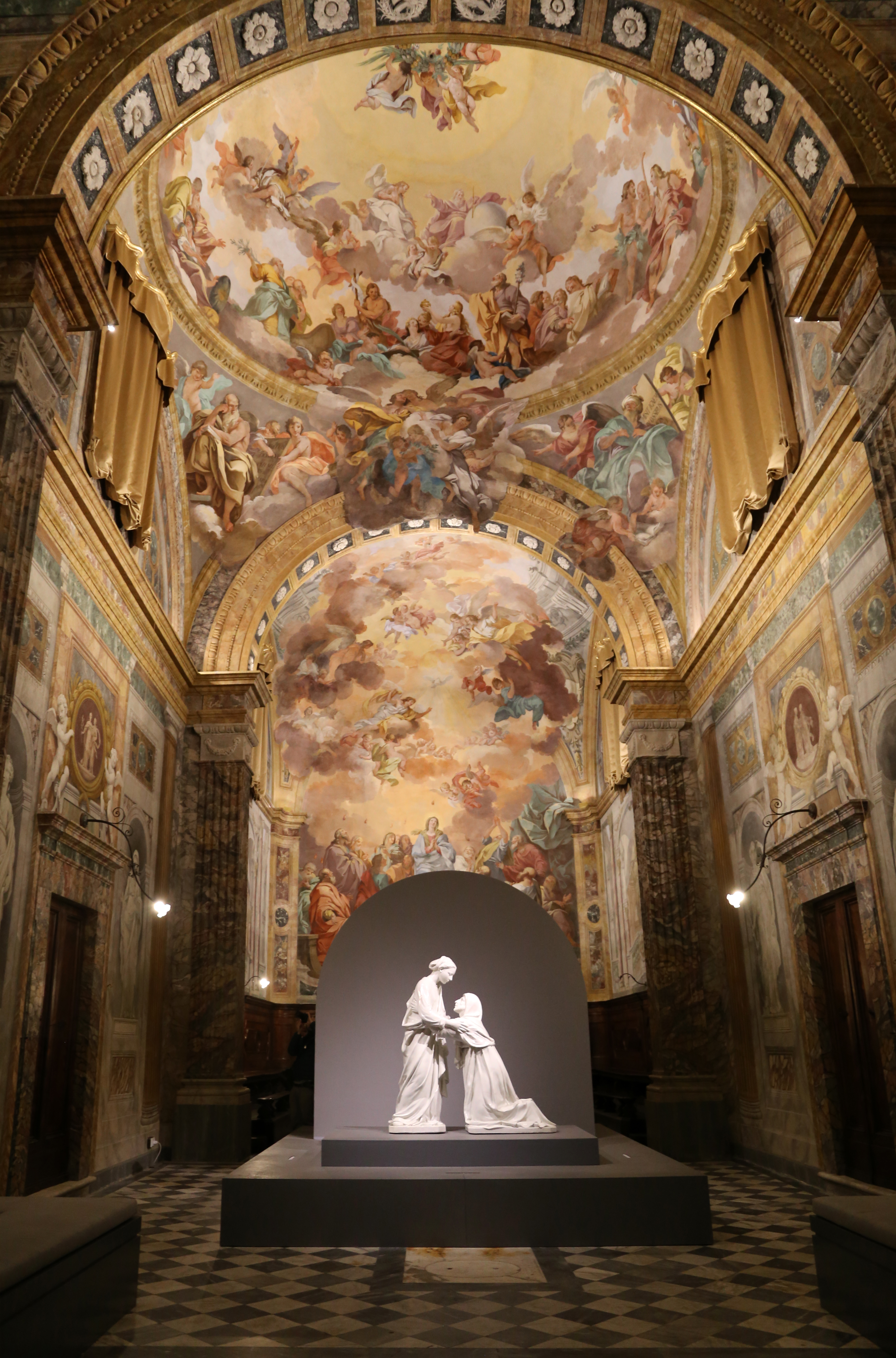
Presbytery frescoes with Visitation by Della Robbia

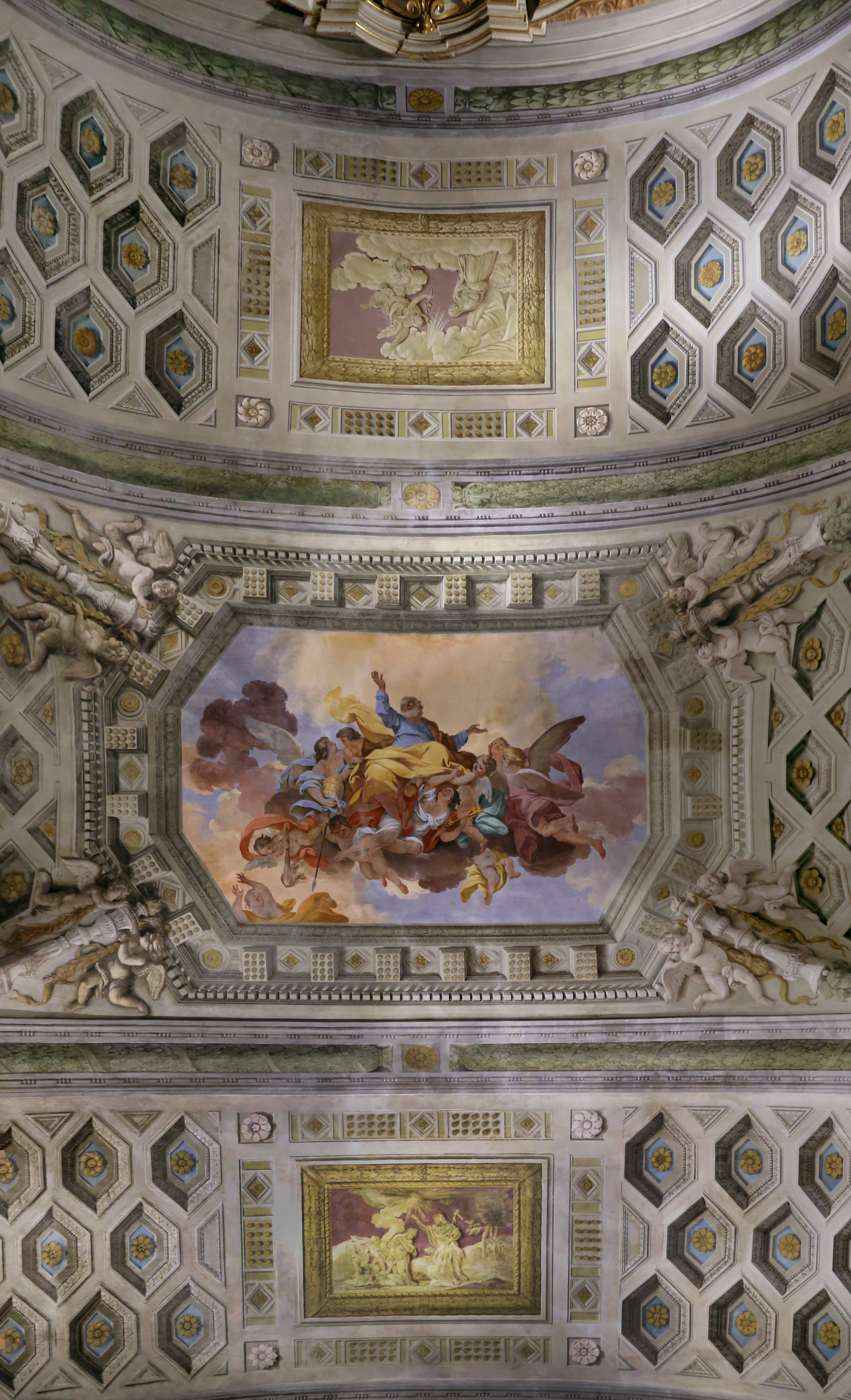
Trompe-l'œil nave ceiling frescoes

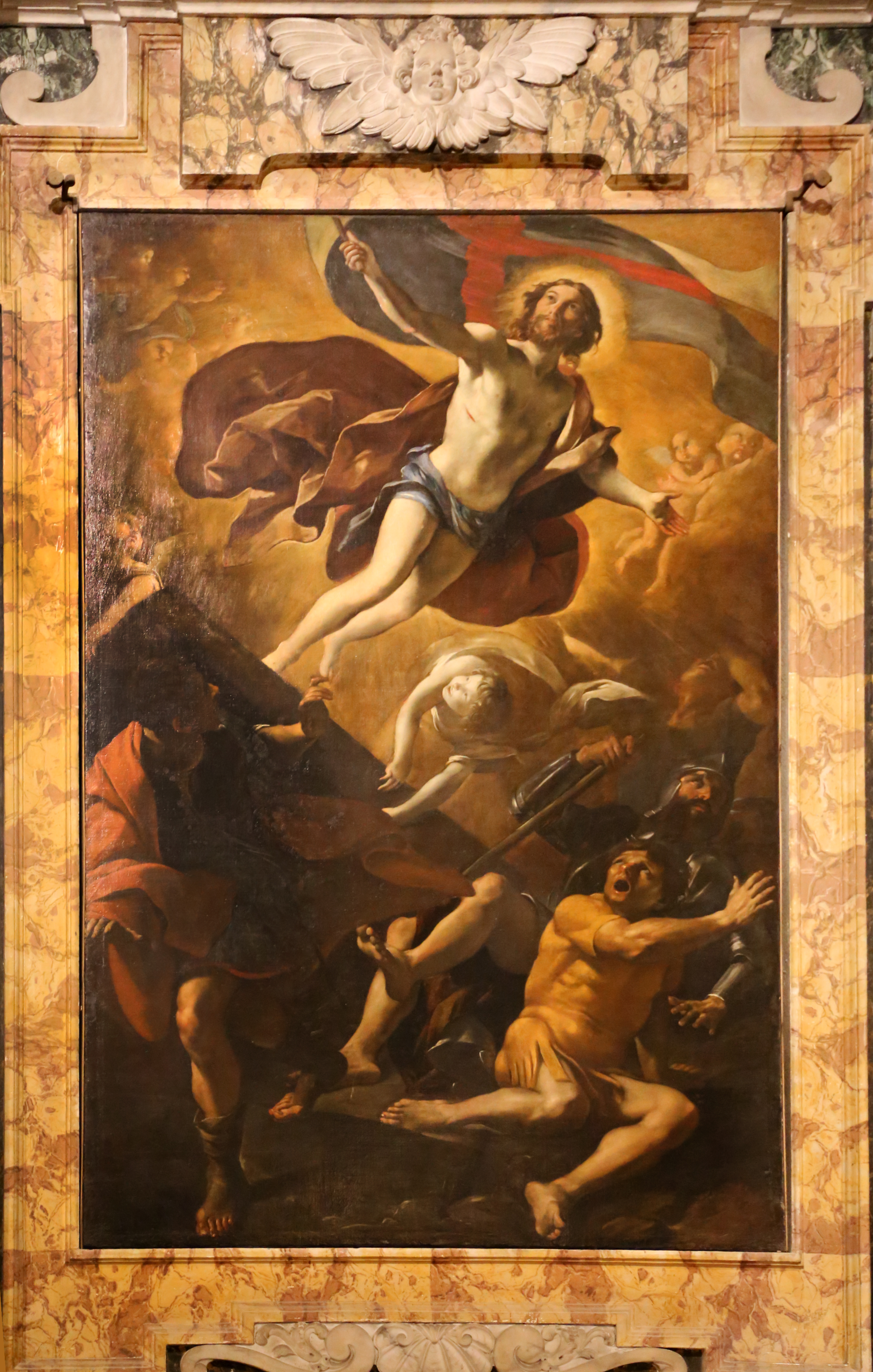
Resurrection of Christ by Lanfranco

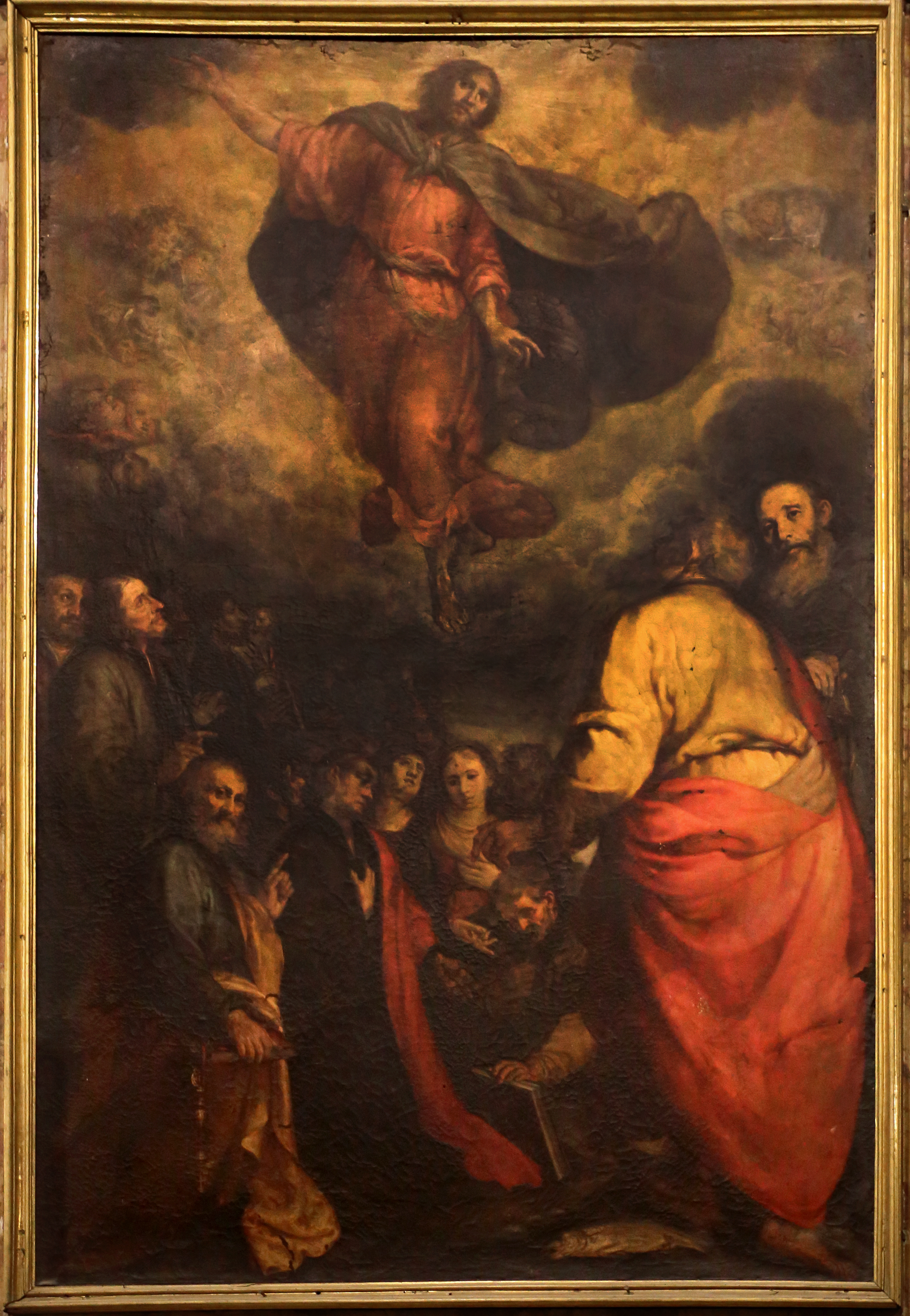
Ascension of Christ by Marucelli
