= Pieve di Santa Maria, Vicopisano =

Roman Catholic church in Vicopisano, Italy

Coordinates: 43.70025°N 10.58339°E

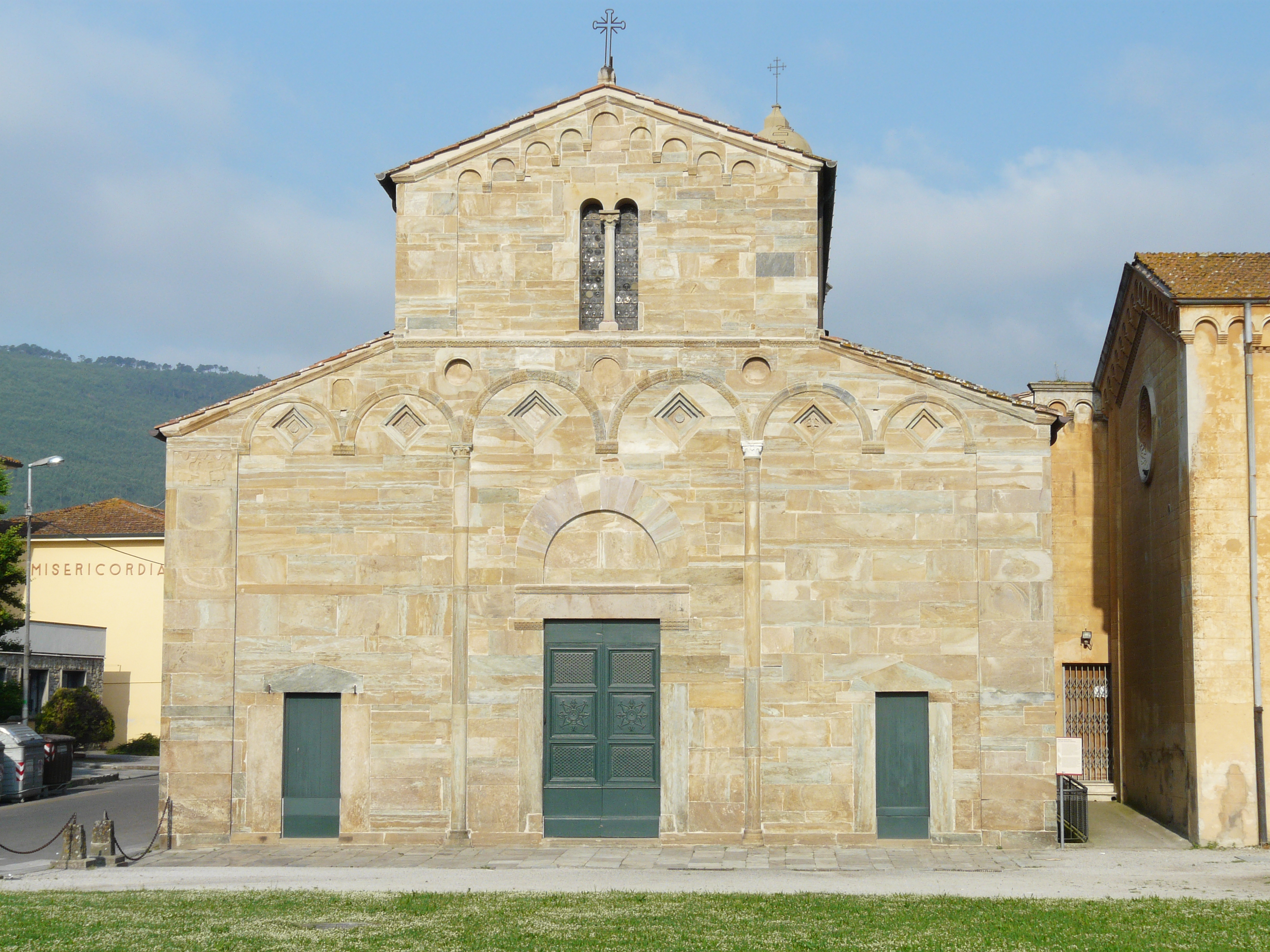
Facade of church

Santa Maria is the Roman Catholic, Romanesque-style church, located on Via Moricotti #2 in the town of Vicopisano in the province of Pisa, Tuscany, Italy.

== History ==
This stone church was originally outside the walls of the nearby castle, the Rocca di Vicopisano, hence its description as a pieve or rural parish. Documents make note of a church of this name in Vicopisano by the year 934. The church facade has walled up arches and geometric and floral decorations; while the interior is simple. It has a central nave and two aisles, separated by re-used Ancient Roman columns with Romanesque capitals. The church layout we see today likely dates to the 11th century. The windows are tall and narrow.

The main altar has a wooden sculptural group depicting a deposition from the cross, whose dating is attributed to the 13th-century. At one time the wood was painted. Traces of 13th-century frescoes were discovered behind stone side altars that flanked the aisle.
