= Valentino Baldi =

Italian painter

Valentino Baldi (1774 – October 22, 1816) was an Italian painter, mainly of quadratura and ornamentation in fresco and tempera.

== Biography ==
Born in Pistoia, he was the son of Raffaello Baldi, and trained under Francesco Beneforti (1715–1802) in Pistoia. There he was a student along with Baronto Tolemei. He then moved to Bologna where he worked under Mauro Tesi. After Tesi died, Baldi received patronage in Bologna from the Senator Girolamo Ranuzzi, the Count Massimiliano Gini, and lastly the Signore Biagio Bugamelli. He profited from making copies of still-life paintings.
