= Vicopisano =

- Comune
- Comune di Vicopisano
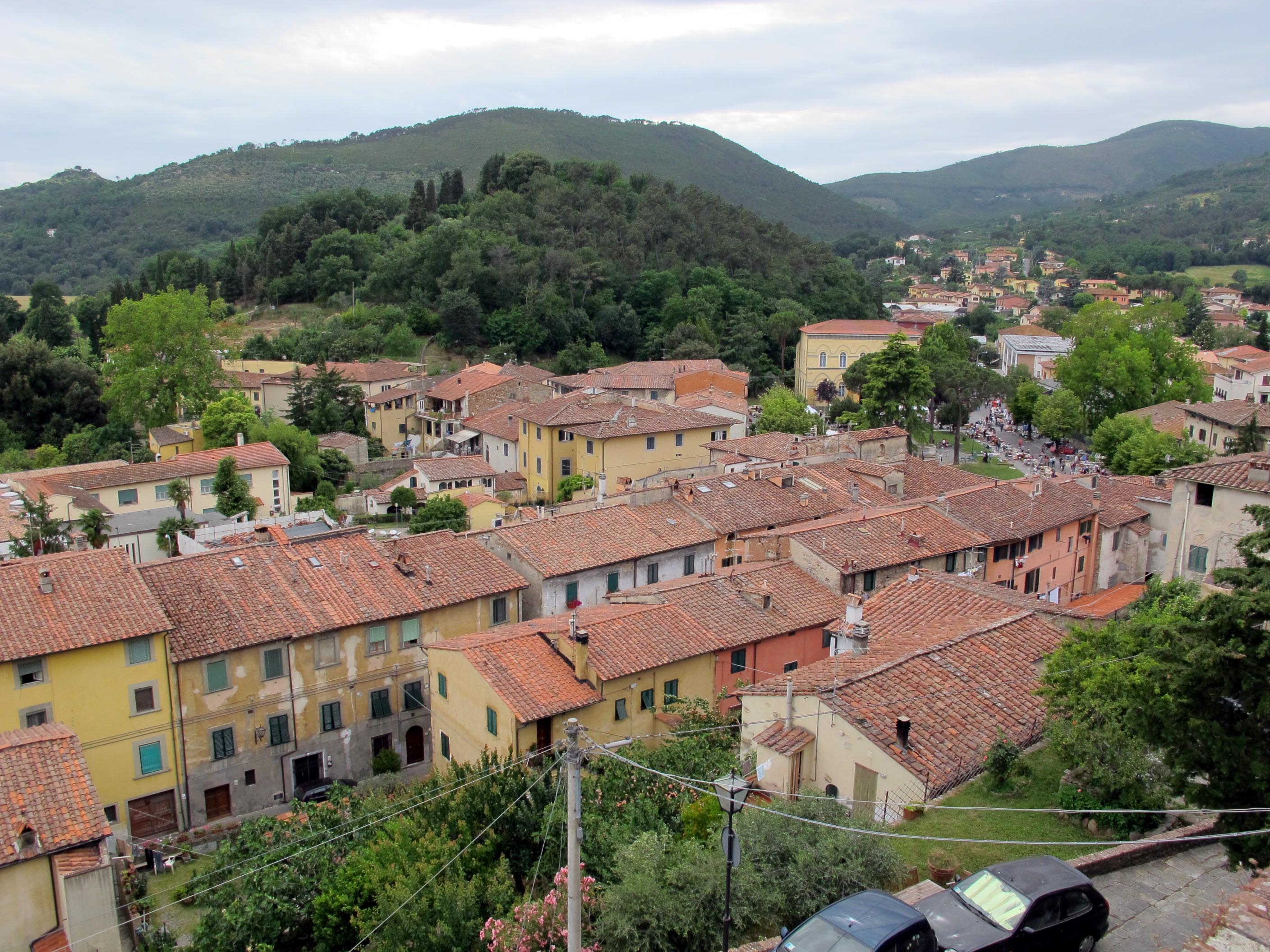
- Panoramic view

- Coat of arms

- Vicopisano within the Province of Pisa

- Location within Italy Location within Tuscany
- Coordinates: 43°41′N 10°35′E
- Country: Italy
- Region: Tuscany
- Province: Pisa (PI)
- Frazioni: Caprona, Cucigliana, Lugnano, Noce, San Giovanni alla Vena, Uliveto Terme

Government
  - Mayor: Matteo Ferrucci

Area
  - Total: 26.9 km^{2} (10.4 sq mi)
- Elevation: 12 m (39 ft)

Population (2008)
  - Total: 8,253
  - Density: 307/km^{2} (795/sq mi)
- Demonym: Vicaresi
- Time zone: UTC+1 (CET)
  - Summer (DST): UTC+2 (CEST)
- Postal code: 56010
- Dialing code: 050
- Patron saint: St. Mary
- Saint day: First Sunday in October
- Website: Official website

Vicopisano is a comune (municipality) in the Province of Pisa in the Italian region Tuscany, located about 50 kilometres (31 mi) west of Florence and about 15 kilometres (9 mi) east of Pisa. It occupies the former valley of the Arno River (which now flows some km southwards), bounded by the Monte Pisano from north.

== History ==
In medieval times Vicopisano was a flourishing fortified center of the Republic of Pisa. It was conquered by Florence in 1406. Here a castle (Rocca Nuova) designed by Filippo Brunelleschi was built in 1434. The Pieve di Santa Maria is a 12th-century parish church built in Romanesque style.

== Geography ==
Vicopisano borders the following municipalities: Bientina, Buti, Calci, Calcinaia, Cascina and San Giuliano Terme. It counts the hamlets (frazioni) of Caprona, Cucigliana, Lugnano, Noce, San Giovanni alla Vena and Uliveto Terme.

== Demographics ==
Historical population

Year	Pop.	±%
1861	6,252	—
1871	6,648	+6.3%
1881	7,111	+7.0%
1901	7,173	+0.9%
1911	7,349	+2.5%

Year	Pop.	±%
1921	7,404	+0.7%
1931	7,345	−0.8%
1936	7,330	−0.2%
1951	7,558	+3.1%
1961	7,759	+2.7%

Year	Pop.	±%
1971	7,366	−5.1%
1981	7,365	−0.0%
1991	7,584	+3.0%
2001	7,907	+4.3%
2011	8,479	+7.2%

Source: Data from ISTAT

== Economy ==
Economical activities include ceramics, mechanics (Piaggio) and bottling of mineral waters. The agriculture is based on olive oil and cereals.

== Main sights ==
- Brunelleschi Rocca (castle), with an annexed Romanesque church from the 12th century
- 12 medieval towers
- Pieve di Santa Maria (12th century), with 13th-century frescoes.
- Pieve di San Jacopo
- Palazzo Pretorio (12th century)
- Palazzo della Vecchia Posta (12th century)
- Villa Fehr
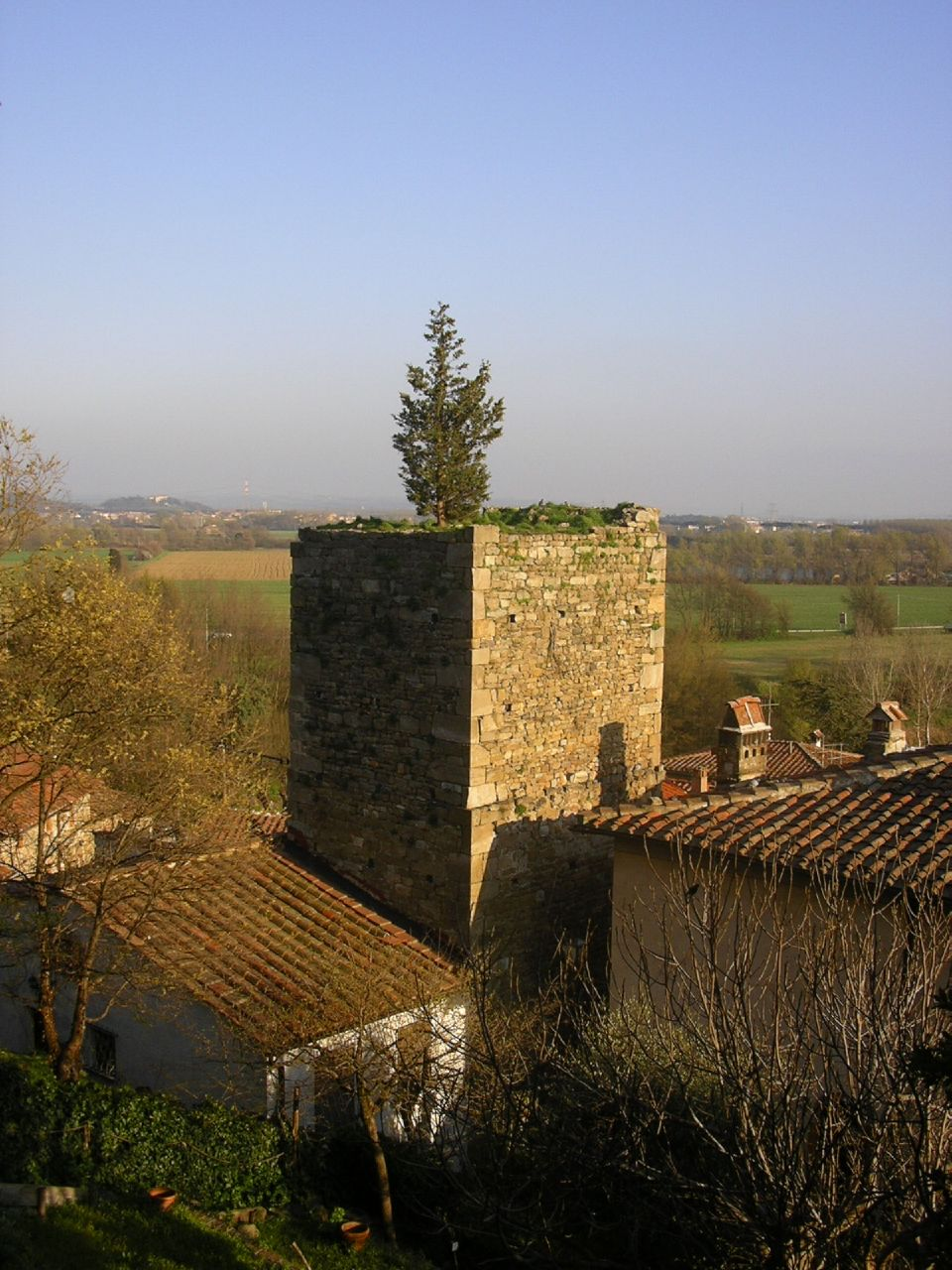
One of the towers of Vicopisano

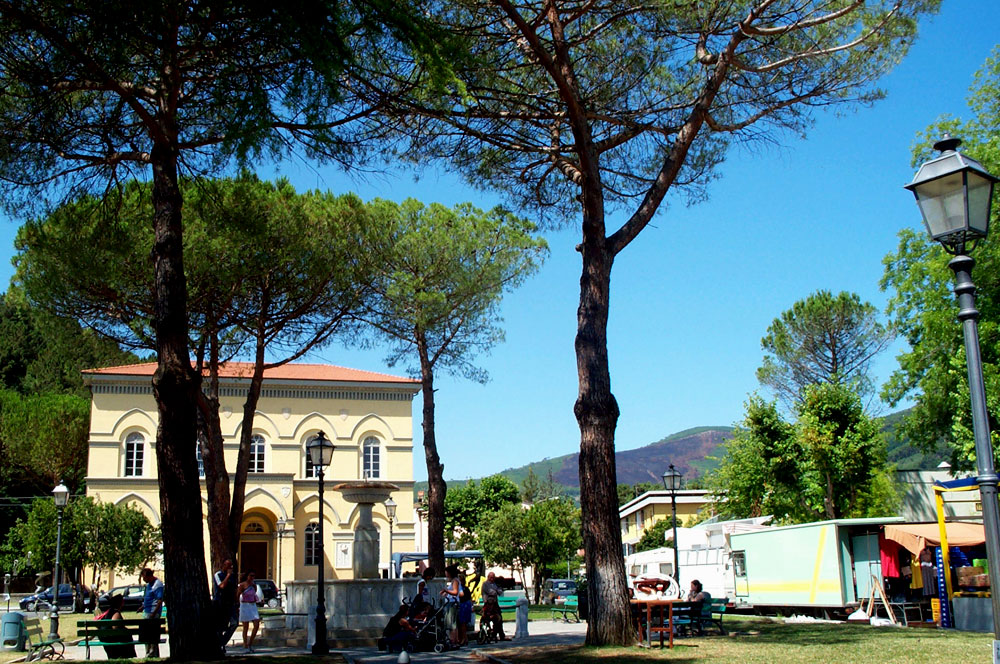
The town's square

== Notable people ==
- Domenico Cavalca (1270-1342), writer
