= Mauro Antonio Tesi =

Italian painter

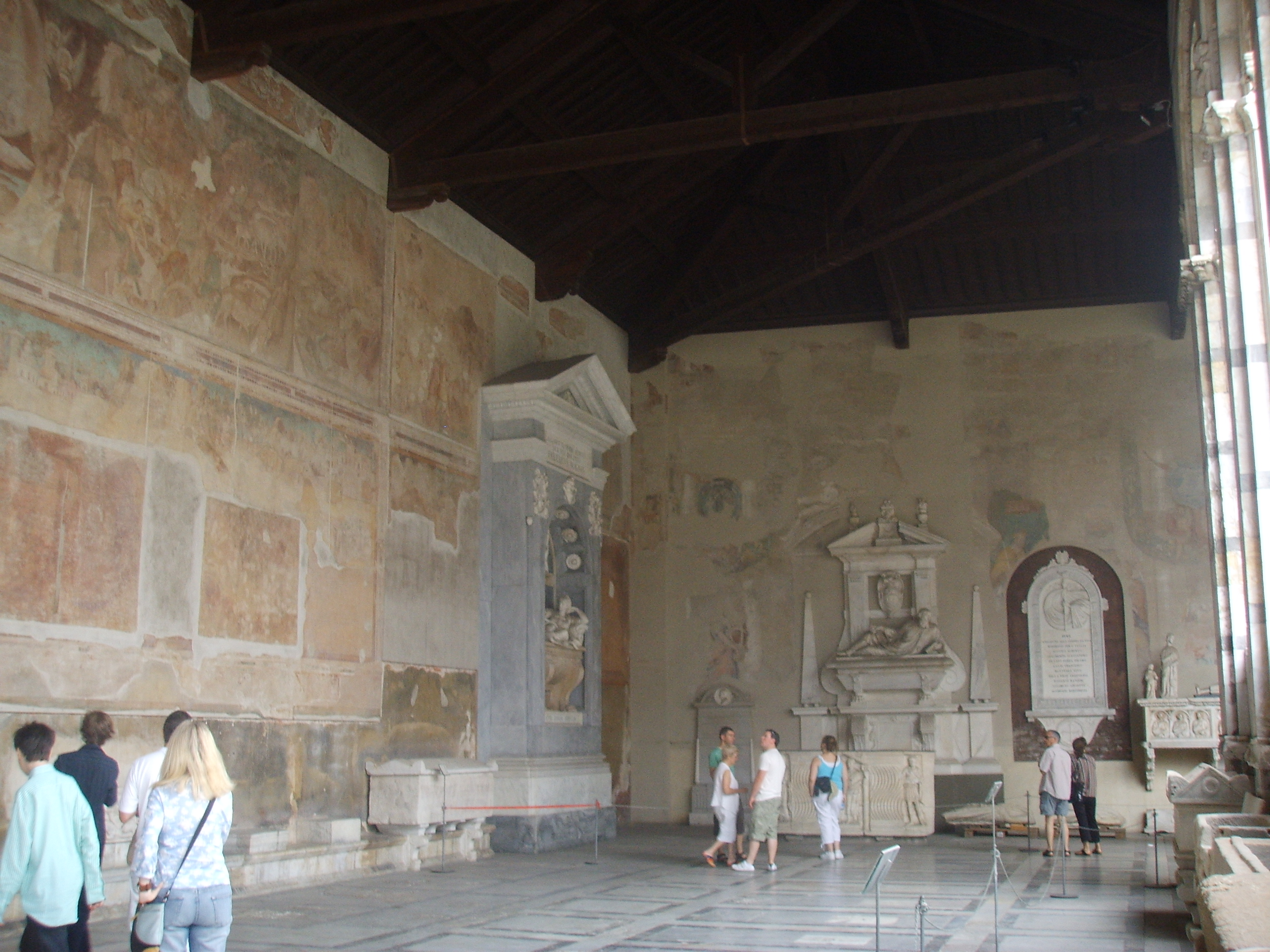
Algarotti thumbstone, designed by Tesi, on the left in neo-classical style

Mauro Antonio Tesi (Italian pronunciation: [ˈmauro anˈtɔːnjo ˈteːzi]; January 15, 1730 – July 18, 1766), or, as he is sometimes called, after the name given him by his patron and admirer, Francesco Algarotti, "Il Maurino", was an Italian painter of the late-Baroque period, active mainly in Bologna. He is also considered an early proponent of the Neo-classical style.

== Biography ==
He was born in Montalbano near Modena. He was largely self-taught and worked as both a decorative and an architectural painter in churches and both public and private buildings in Bologna and Florence. In 1764, he completed the nave ceiling frescoes for the small church of San Leone, Pistoia. He travelled with and illustrated the works of his compagnon Algarotti and designed the funeral monument on the Campo Santo in Pisa. One of his pupils was Valentino Baldi. He died in Bologna two years after Algarotti, it is said also by tuberculosis.

== Works ==
Two of his paintings can be seen in the Residenzschloss Ludwigsburg.

== Sources ==
- Farquhar, Maria (1855). Ralph Nicholson Wornum (ed.). Biographical catalogue of the principal Italian painters. Woodfall & Kinder, Angel Court, Skinner Street, London. pp. 187. "Wornum."
- Hobbes, James R. (1849). Picture collector's manual adapted to the professional man, and the amateur. T&W Boone, 29 Bond Street. p. 447.
- Tiraboschi, Girolamo (1786). Notizie de' pittori, scultori, incisori, e architetti natii degli stati del Serenissimo Signor Duca di Modena. Modena: Presso la Societa' Tipografica. pp. 338–345.
