= Cucigliana =

- Frazione
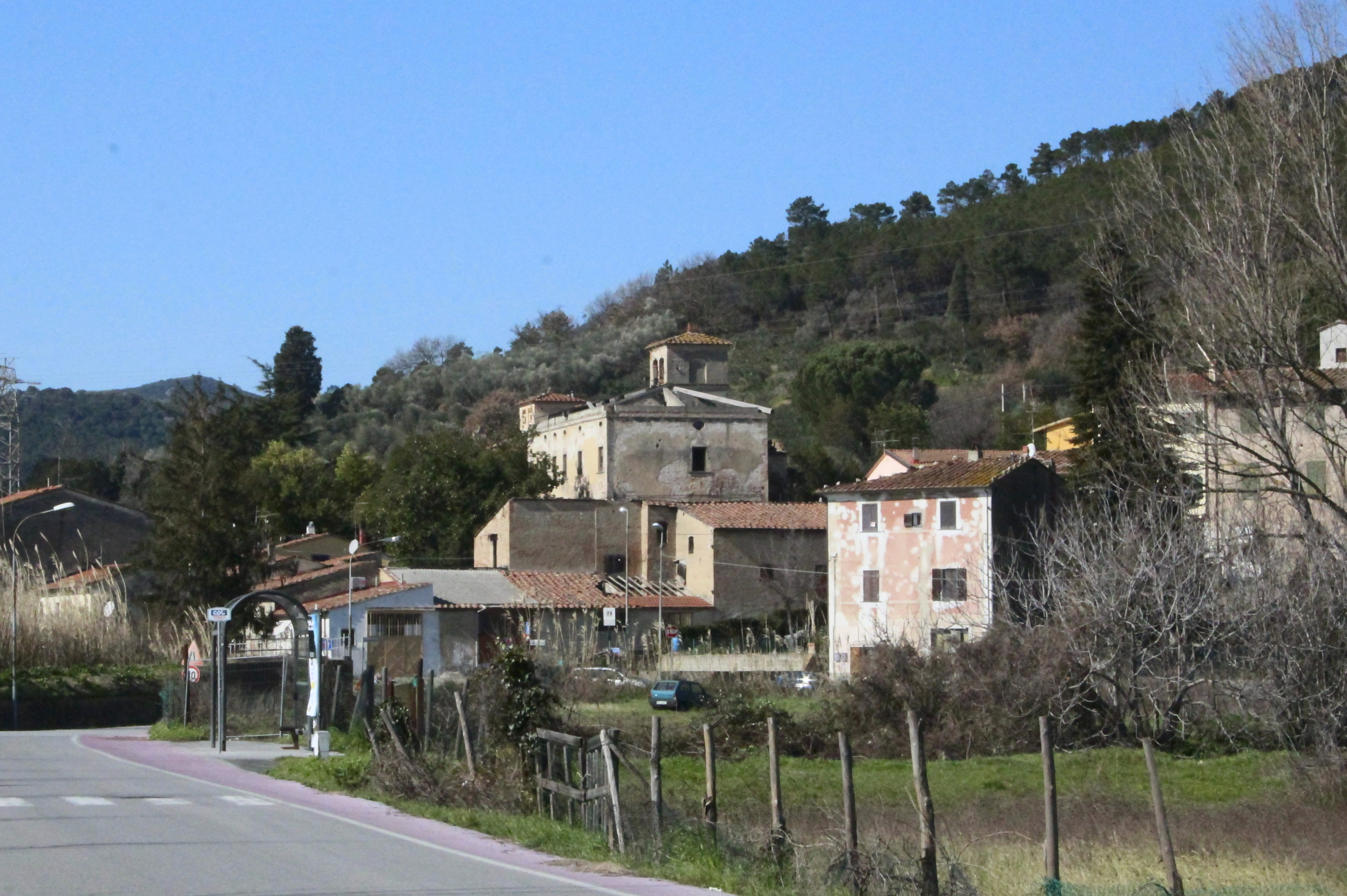

- Location of Cucigliana in Italy
- Coordinates: 43°41′6″N 10°33′11″E
- Country: Italy
- Region: Tuscany
- Province: Pisa (PI)
- Comune: Vicopisano
- Elevation: 10 m (33 ft)

Population
  - Total: 715
- Time zone: UTC+1 (CET)
  - Summer (DST): UTC+2 (CEST)
- Postal code: 56010
- Dialing code: (+39) 050

Cucigliana is a village in Tuscany, central Italy, administratively a frazione of the comune of Vicopisano, province of Pisa. At the time of the 2006 parish census its population was 715.

Cucigliana is about 17 km from Pisa and 4 km from Vicopisano.
