= San Torpé, Pisa =

Church in Pisa, Italy

Coordinates: 43.7219°N 10.4022°E

San Torpé is a Roman Catholic church located in Largo del Parlascio #20 in the town of Pisa, region of Tuscany, Italy.

== History ==
A church and adjacent convent were erected between 1254 and 1278 by monk of the Umiliati order, likely to house the relics of Saint Torpe from a nearby decrepit church of San Rossore a Tombolo. This order was suppressed in 1571 by Pope Pius V, and it passed in 1584 to monks of the Franciscan order of Minims of San Francesco of Paola. The Franciscans were dedicated to redecoration of the church and employed the artists Alfonso Robertelli, Bartolomeo di Domenico (altar of San Francesco da Paola), Guerruccio Guerrucci (altar of the Madonna), and Baldassarri di Pasquino Tacci(canvas depicting the Madonna).

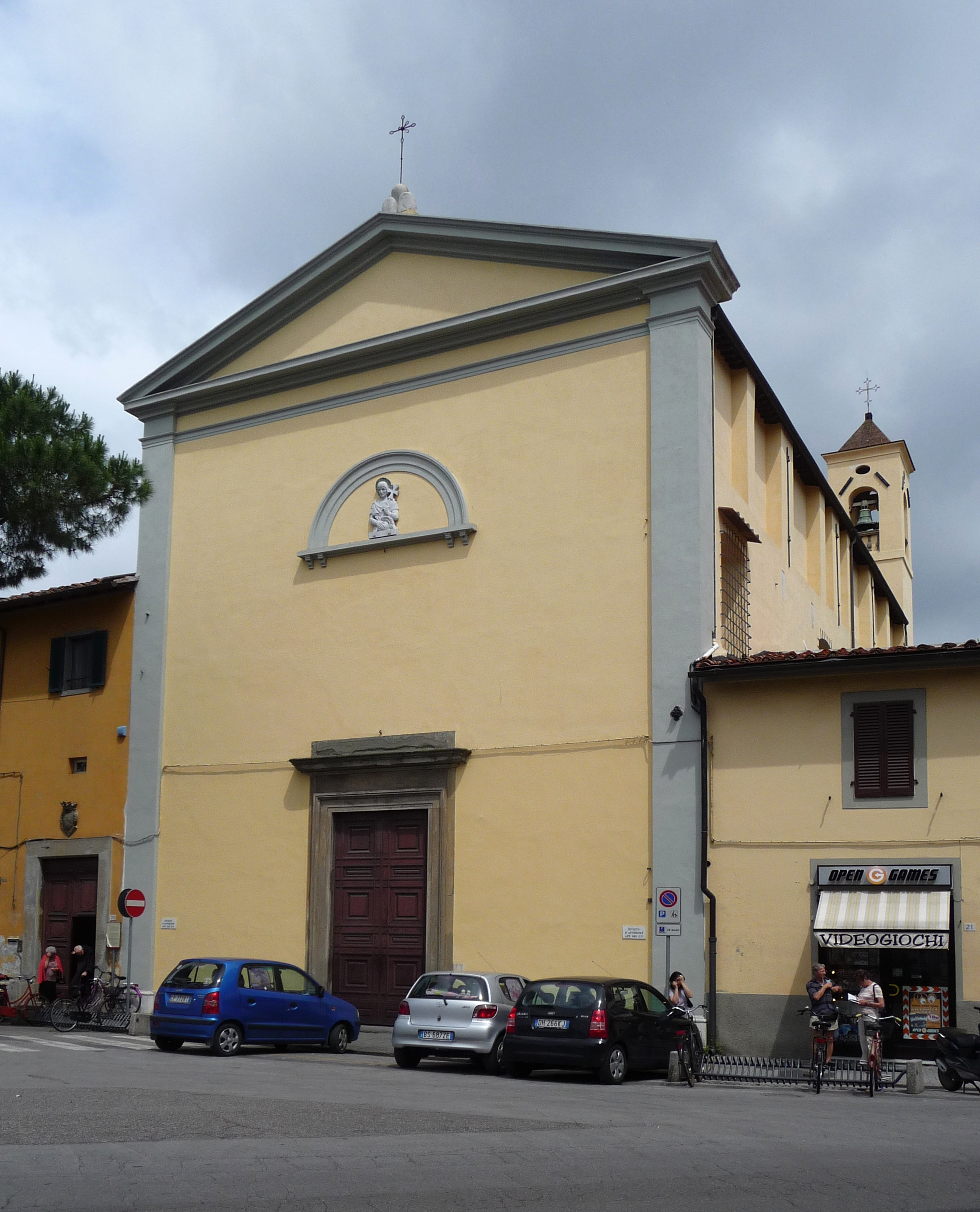
Church of San Torpé, Pisa, Italy

When this order was suppressed, the church was not assigned until 1808 first to the Vallombrosans and next to Carthusians, and in 1816, to the Carmelite order. In 1866, that order was briefly suppressed and much of the interior decoration underwent auction. The monastery and church are still administered by Carmelite nuns.

== Decoration ==
The façade is plain with a modern lunette in sandstone depicting a bust of San Torpé, by Antonio Fascetti. In 1934, lightning damaged the belltower. The inside of the church was remodeled over the years. The side walls have 17th-century canvases depicting St Simone Stock and St Teresa (left wall) and St John of the Cross and St Andrea Corsini (right wall) by an unknown painter. The sober 17th-century main altar in Carrara marble (1619) was designed by Giuseppe Zucchetti. The silver reliquary (1667) in the shape of the bust of Saint Torpè, now in a glass case, was donated by the Lanfranchi brothers.

The choir has 17th-century canvases depicting The Conversion of St Giovanni Gualberto and a Madonna and Child with Saints Torpè, Anna and angels and a Madonna and Child with Saints James and Philip by Francesco Vanni.

The altarpieces on the right wall, dedicated respectively to St Francis of Paola and St Charles Borromeo, respectively have altarpieces depicting a Madonna in glory between St John of the Cross and St. Teresa (circa 1820) by Domenico Udine Nani and a Life of a Saint Joseph of Pisa (after 1631) by Giovanni Stefano Maruscelli, originally commissioned from Cesare Monti.
