= Caprona, Vicopisano =

Caprona
- Frazione
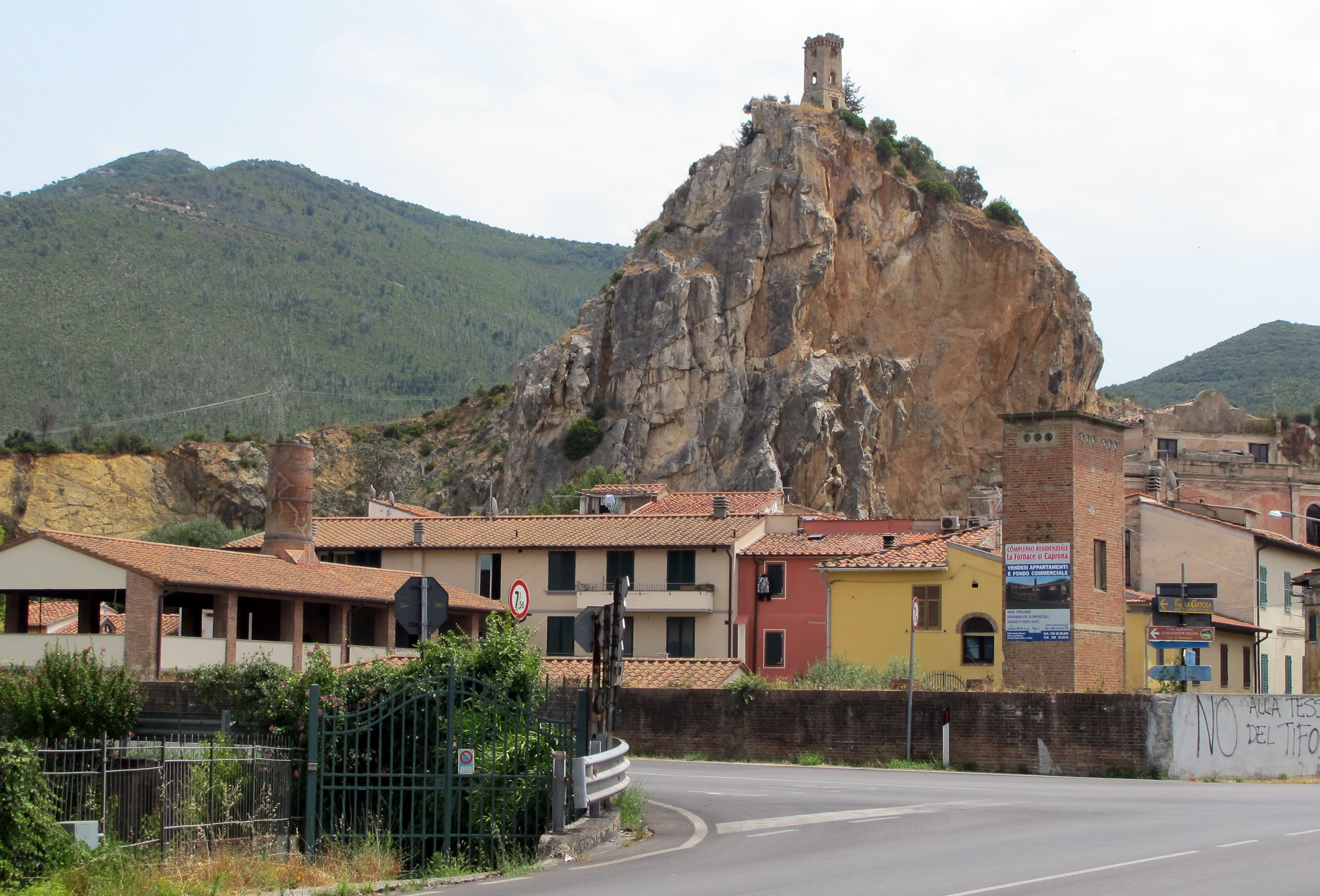

- Location of Caprona in Italy
- Coordinates: 43°42′26″N 10°30′17″E
- Country: Italy
- Region: Tuscany
- Province: Pisa (PI)
- Comune: Vicopisano
- Elevation: 11 m (36 ft)

Population (2011)
  - Total: 543
- Time zone: UTC+1 (CET)
  - Summer (DST): UTC+2 (CEST)
- Postal code: 56011
- Dialing code: (+39) 050

Caprona is a village in Tuscany, central Italy, administratively a frazione of the comune of Vicopisano, province of Pisa. At the time of the 2001 census its population was 507.

Caprona is about 11 km from Pisa and 9 km from Vicopisano.
