= Uliveto Terme =

- Frazione
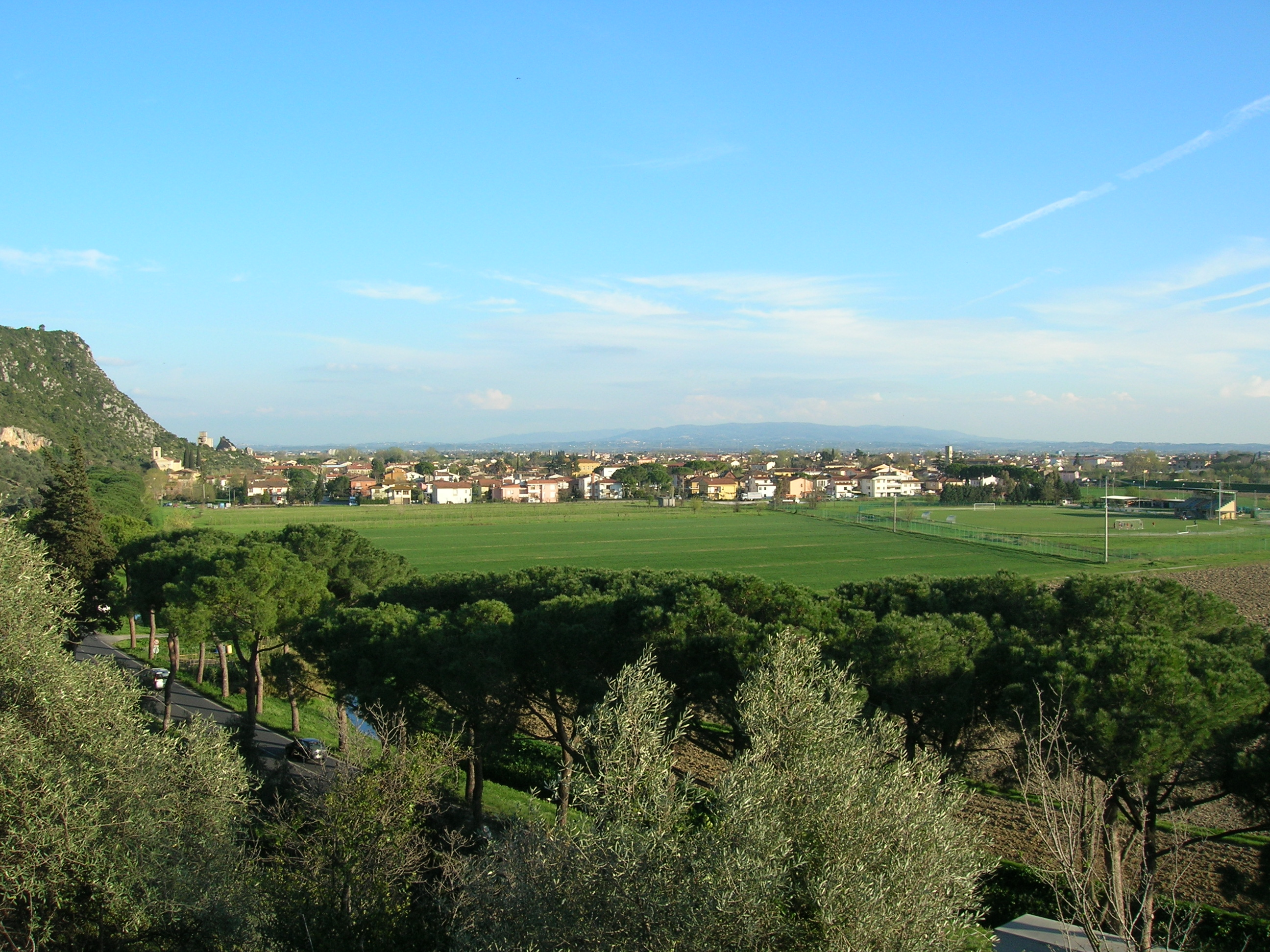
- View of Uliveto Terme

- Location of Uliveto Terme in Italy
- Coordinates: 43°41′45″N 10°31′3″E
- Country: Italy
- Region: Tuscany
- Province: Pisa (PI)
- Comune: Vicopisano
- Elevation: 9 m (30 ft)

Population (2011)
  - Total: 1,337
- Demonym: Ulivetesi
- Time zone: UTC+1 (CET)
  - Summer (DST): UTC+2 (CEST)
- Postal code: 56010
- Dialing code: (+39) 050

Uliveto Terme is a village in Tuscany, central Italy, administratively a frazione of the comune of Vicopisano, province of Pisa. At the time of the 2001 census its population was 1,183.

Uliveto Terme is about 12 km from Pisa and 8 km from Vicopisano. Famous for the Thermal hot Spring and for the production of drinkable water.
