= Diana Wynne Jones bibliography =

Diana Wynne Jones (16 August 1934 – 26 March 2011) was a British writer of fantasy novels for children and adults. She wrote a small amount of non-fiction.

== Fiction ==
=== Books for adults ===
- Changeover (1970) - reissued 2004 with a new introduction by Jones, "The Origins of Changeover"
- A Sudden Wild Magic (1992) - British Fantasy Award nominee
- Deep Secret (1997) - part of the Magids series

=== Standalone books for children and young adults ===
- Wilkins' Tooth (1973); (US title: Witch's Business)
- The Ogre Downstairs (1974)
- Dogsbody (1975) – Carnegie Medal commendation
- Eight Days of Luke (1975)
- Power of Three (1976) – Guardian Prize commendation; Zilveren Griffel (Netherlands)
- The Homeward Bounders (1981)
- The Time of the Ghost (1981)
- Archer's Goon (1984) – Boston Globe–Horn Book Award Fiction runner-up; World Fantasy Award for Best Novel nominee
- Fire and Hemlock (1984) Mythopoeic Fantasy Award finalist; 2005 Phoenix Award runner-up
- A Tale of Time City (1987)
- Black Maria (1991); US title: Aunt Maria
- Hexwood (1993)
- The Merlin Conspiracy (2003) - Magids Series
- The Game (2007)
- Enchanted Glass (2010) – Locus Awards, Young Adult 5th place
- Earwig and the Witch (2011) (Illustrated by Paul O. Zelinsky)
- The Islands of Chaldea (2014), an unfinished novel completed by her sister, Ursula Jones

==== E-book collections ====
- Diana Wynne Jones's Fantastical Journeys Collection (2015): contains A Tale of Time City, The Homeward Bounders, and The Islands of Chaldea
- Diana Wynne Jones's Magic and Myths Collection (2015): contains The Game, Power of Three, Eight Days of Luke, and Dogsbody

=== Series for children and young adults ===
==== Chrestomanci series ====
The Chrestomanci fantasy series is made up of six novels and four short stories.

===== Publication order =====
1. Charmed Life (1977) – Guardian Children's Fiction Prize; Carnegie Medal commendation; Preis der Leseratten
2. The Magicians of Caprona (1980)
3. Witch Week (1982)
4. The Lives of Christopher Chant (1988) – Carnegie Medal commendation
5. Mixed Magics (2000), short stories published 1982 to 2000
6. Conrad's Fate (2005)
7. The Pinhoe Egg (2006) – Mythopoeic Fantasy Award Children's finalist; Locus Award Young Adult Book, 6th place

If the short stories in Mixed Magics are counted separately, the order of release is:

1. Charmed Life (1977)
2. The Magicians of Caprona (1980)
3. Witch Week (1982)
4. "The Sage of Theare", in Hecate's Cauldron (1982) ed. Susan M. Shwartz
5. "Warlock at the Wheel", in Warlock at the Wheel (1984) by Jones
6. "Carol Oneir's Hundredth Dream", in Dragons and Dreams (1986) ed. Jane Yolen et al.
7. The Lives of Christopher Chant (1988)
8. "Stealer of Souls", in Mixed Magics (2000) by Jones
9. Conrad's Fate (2005)
10. The Pinhoe Egg (2006)

===== Reading order as suggested by Jones =====
Diana Wynne Jones recommended starting the books in this order:

1. Charmed Life (1977)
2. The Lives of Christopher Chant (1988)

The remaining novels and short stories can then be read in any order.

===== Chronicles of Chrestomanci =====
The novels were also published as a three-volume series called Chronicles of Chrestomanci:

- Volume 1 (2001) contains Charmed Life and The Lives of Christopher Chant
- Volume 2 (2001) contains Witch Week and The Magicians of Caprona
- Volume 3 (2008) contains Conrad's Fate and The Pinhoe Egg

==== Dalemark Quartet ====
1. Cart and Cwidder (1975)
2. Drowned Ammet (1977)
3. The Spellcoats (1979)
4. Crown of Dalemark (1993) – Mythopoeic Award, Children's Fantasy

"The True State of Affairs" is set in Dalemark, but doesn't share any characters with the novels.

===== Compilations =====
- The Dalemark Quartet, Vol. 1: Cart and Cwidder & Drowned Ammet (1977)
- The Dalemark Quartet, Vol. 2: The Spellcoats & The Crown of Dalemark (1993)
- The Dalemark Quartet (2003) (Illustrated by Yvonne Gilbert)

==== Derkholm series ====
1. Dark Lord of Derkholm (1998) – Mythopoeic Award, Children's Fantasy
2. Year of the Griffin (2000)

==== The Moving Castle series ====
1. Howl's Moving Castle (1986) – Boston Globe–Horn Book Award Fiction runner-up; 2006 Phoenix Award
2. Castle in the Air (1990) – Mythopoeic Fantasy Award Children's finalist
3. House of Many Ways (2008) – Mythopoeic Fantasy Award Children's finalist

===== Compilations =====
- Wizard's Castle (Howl's Moving Castle, and Castle in the Air) (2002) (Illustrated by Yvonne Gilbert)
- World of Howl Collection (Howl's Moving Castle, Castle in the Air, and House of Many Ways) (2014)

==== Magids series ====
- Deep Secret (1997), a novel marketed for adults, listed above
- The Merlin Conspiracy (2003) – Locus Awards, Young Adult 3rd place, a novel marketed for young adults

=== Picture books and books for younger readers ===
- Who Got Rid of Angus Flint? (1978), illustrated by John Sewell; text originally published in Young Winter's Tales 6 (1975)
- The Four Grannies (1980)
- Chair Person (1989)
- Wild Robert (1989)
- Yes, Dear (1992), large-format picture book illus. Graham Philpott
- Puss in Boots (1999)
- Enna Hittims (2006), Illustrated by Peter Utton

==== Compilations ====
- Stopping for a Spell (1993), Illustrated by Chris Mould. Contains "Who Got Rid of Angus Flint?", "The Four Grannies", and "Chair Person"
- Vile Visitors (2012). Contains "Who Got Rid of Angus Flint", and "Chair Person"
- Freaky Families (2013). Contains "The Four Grannies", and "Auntie Bea's Day Out"

==== Anthologies edited by Jones ====
- Hidden Turnings: A Collection of Stories Through Time and Space (Editor, 1989)
  - Introduction
  - "True Believer" by Douglas Hill
  - "Ceres Passing" by Tanith Lee
  - "Fifty-Fafty" by Robert Westall
  - "Dogfaerie" by Garry Kilworth
  - "The Walled Garden" by Lisa Tuttle
  - "The Master" by Diana Wynne Jones
  - "The Vision" by Mary Rayner
  - "Urgeya's Choice" by Geraldine Harris
  - "The Sky Sea" by Helen Cresswell
  - "A Bird That Whistles" by Emma Bull
  - "Kalifriki of the Thread" by Roger Zelazny
  - "Turntables of the Night" by Terry Pratchett
  - "The Authors (Hidden Turnings)"
- Spellbound: Fantasy Stories (Editor, 1994) Alternate titles: Fantasy Stories (1994, Illustrated by Wayne Anderson and Robin Lawrie), Spellbound (1994/1995, Illustrated by Robin Lawrie, republished 2007, US), Fantasy Stories: Red Hot Reads (2003/2004)
  - "The Peasant and the Devil" by The Brothers Grimm
  - "Boris Chernevsky's Hands" by Jane Yolen (from Hecate's Cauldron)
  - "The Hobgoblin's Hat" by Tove Jansson (from Finn Family Moomintroll)
  - "Ully the Piper" by Andre Norton
  - "Milo Conducts the Dawn" by Norton Juster
  - "Who Goes Down this Dark Road?" by Joan Aiken
  - "The House of Harfang" by C. S. Lewis (from The Silver Chair)
  - "Martha in The Witch's Power" by Katharine Mary Briggs (from Hobberdy Dick)
  - "Abu Ali Meets a Dragon" by Noel Langley from The Land of Green Ginger)
  - "The Box of Delights" by John Masefield (an extract)
  - "The Amazing Flight of the Gump" by L. Frank Baum (from The Land of Oz)
  - "On the Great Wall" by Rudyard Kipling (from Puck of Pook's Hill)
  - "The Waking of the Kraken" by Eva Ibbotson (from Which Witch?)
  - "The Caves in the Hills" by Elizabeth Goudge (from Henrietta's House)
  - "Bigger than the Baker's Boy" by E. Nesbit (from Five Children and It)
  - "Jermain and the Sorceress" by Patricia C. Wrede (from The Seven Towers)
  - "Una and the Red Cross Knight" by Andrew Lang (from The Red Book of Romance)
  - "What the Cat Told Me" by Diana Wynne Jones
  - Acknowledgements

=== Short stories ===
==== Contributed short stories ====
These short stories were not published as separate volumes, and not included in any collections entirely written by Jones (the next section).

- "Mela Worms", in Arrows of Eros (NEL, 1989, editor Alex Stewart)
- "I'll Give You My Word", in Firebirds Rising: An Anthology of Original Science Fiction and Fantasy (Penguin, 2005, and 2006, editor Sharyn November), and Year's Best Fantasy 7 (2007, editors David G. Hartnell & Kathryn Cramer)
- "JoBoy", in The Dragon Book: Magical Tales from the Masters of Modern Fantasy (Ace, 2009, editors Jack Dann and Gardner Dozois), and The Best Science Fiction and Fantasy of the Year, Volume 4 (2010, editor Jonathan Strahan)
- "Samantha's Diary", in Stories: All-New Tales (HarperCollins, 2010, editors Neil Gaiman and Al Sarrantonio)

==== Short story collections ====
- Warlock at the Wheel and Other Stories (1984), 8 stories publ. 1978 to 1984
  - "Warlock at the Wheel"
  - "The Plague of Peacocks"
  - "The Fluffy Pink Toadstool"
  - "Aunt Bea's Day Out"
  - "Carruthers"
  - "No One"
  - "Dragon Reserve, Home Eight"
  - "The Sage of Theare"
- Everard's Ride (1994/1995, republished 1997): a 1983 essay and 7 stories publ. 1984 to 1995
  - Introduction by Patricia C. Wrede
  - "Everard's Ride"
  - "Nad and Dan adn Quaffy"
  - "The Shape of the Narrative in 'The Lord of the Rings'" (essay)
  - "No One"
  - "Dragon Reserve, Home Eight"
  - "The Master"
  - "The Plague of Peacocks"
  - "The True State of Affairs"
- Stopping for a Spell: Three Fantasies (1993), publ. 1975 to 1989, Illustrated by Chris Mould
  - "Who Got Rid of Angus Flint?"
  - "The Four Grannies"
  - "Chair Person"
- Minor Arcana (1996), UK Release, 7 stories publ. 1982 to 1995 – British Fantasy Award nominee
  - "The Sage of Theare"
  - "The Master"
  - "The Girl Who Loved the Sun"
  - "Dragon Reserve, Home Eight"
  - "What the Cat Told Me"
  - "Nad and Dan Adn Quaffy"
  - "The True State of Affairs"
- Believing is Seeing: Seven Stories (1999), US Release, 7 stories publ. 1982 to 1999, Illustrated by Nenad Jakesevik
  - "The Sage of Theare"
  - "The Master"
  - "Enna Hittims"
  - "The Girl Who Loved the Sun"
  - "Dragon Reserve, Home Eight"
  - "What the Cat Told Me"
  - "Nad and Dan adn Quaffy"
  - "Excerpt from Howl's Moving Castle"
  - "Excerpt from The Merlin Conspiracy"
  - "Excerpt from Dark Lord of Derkholm"
  - "Excerpt from Archer's Goon"
- Mixed Magics: Four Tales of Chrestomanci (2000)
  - "Warlock at the Wheel"
  - "Stealer of Souls"
  - "Carol Oneir's Hundredth Dream"
  - "The Sage of Theare"
- Unexpected Magic: Collected Stories (2002), 16 stories published 1978 to 2003
  - "The Girl Jones"
  - "Nad and Dan adn Quaffy"
  - "The Plague of Peacocks"
  - "The Master"
  - "Enna Hittims"
  - "The Girl who Loved the Sun"
  - "The Fluffy Pink Toadstool"
  - "Auntie Bea's Day Out"
  - "Carruthers"
  - "What the Cat Told Me"
  - "The Green Stone"
  - "The Fat Wizard"
  - "No One"
  - "Dragon Reserve, Home Eight"
  - "Little Dot"
  - "Everard's Ride"

==== Standalone short stories ====
Published also in other collections

- "Who Got Rid of Angus Flint?" (1978)
- "The Four Grannies" (1980 and 1981)
- "Chair Person" (1989)
- "Stealer of Souls" (2000)
- "Enna Hittims" (2006)

==== Anthologies her works were included in ====
- Young Winter's Tales 3 (1972, edited by M. R. Hodgkin), with "Carruthers"
- Young Winter's Tales 6 (1975, edited by M. R. Hodgkin), with "Who Got Rid of Angus Flint?"
- Young Winter's Tales 8 (1978, edited by D. J. Denney), with "Auntie Bea's Day Out"
- Puffin Post v13 #4 (1979, magazine), with "The Fluffy Pink Toadstool"
- The Cat Flap and the Apple Pie and Other Funny Stories (1979, edited by Lance Salway) with "Auntie Bea's Day Out"
- Hecate's Cauldron (1982, editor Susan Schwartz), with "The Sage of Theare"
- Dragons & Dreams: A Collection of New Fantasy and Science Fiction Stories (1986, editor Jane Yolen), with "Carol Oneir's Hundredth Dream"
- Guardian Angels (1987, editor Stephanie Nuttell, Viking Kestrel) with "The Fat Wizard"
- The Methuen Book of Humorous Stories (1987, editor Jennifer Kavanagh, illustrator Scowler Anderson), with "Enna Hittims"
- Gaslight and Ghosts (1988, editors Stephen Jones and Jo Fletcher) with "The Green Stone"
- Arrows of Eros (1989, editor Alex Stewart), with "Mela Worms"
- Dragons and Warrior Daughters: Fantasy Stories by Women Writers (1989, editor Jessica Yates), with "Dragon Reserve, Home Eight"
- Hidden Turnings (1989), with "The Master"
- Things That Go Bump in the Night (1989, editors Jane Yolen and Martin Harry Greenberg) with "Chair Person"
- Digital Dreams (1990, editor David V. Barrett), with "Nad and Dan adn Quaffy"
- Heartache (1990, edited by Miraim Hodgson, Methuen), with "The Girl Who Loved the Sun"
- Fenix, V3, #1, 1992 (1992, editor Rafal A. Ziemkiewicz), with "Mela Worms" (translation)
- Bruce Coville's UFOs (1994, 2000, edited by Bruce Coville), with "Dragon Reserve, Home Eight"
- A Treasury of Witches and Wizards (1996, editor David Bennett), republished The Kingfisher Treasury of Witch and Wizard Stories (2004, editor David Bennett), with "The Fat Wizard"
- The Random House Book of Fantasy Stories (1997, editor Mike Ashley), alternate title Fantasy Stories, with "The Green Stone"
- Mystery Stories (1998, editor Helen Cresswell), with "The Master"
- The Wizards' Den: Spellbinding Stories of Magic & Magicians (2001 and 2003, editor Peter Haining), with "Carol Oneir's Hundredth Dream"
- Firebirds: An Anthology of Original Fantasy and Science Fiction (2003, editor Sharyn November), with "Little Dot"
- The Mammoth Book of Sorcerer's Tales: The Ultimate Collection of Magical Fantasy (2004, editor Mike Ashley), with "The Sage of Theare"
- Now We Are Sick: An Anthology of Nasty Verse (2005, Editors Neil Gaiman and Stephen Jones), with "A Slice of Life" (Poetry for adults)
- Firebirds Rising: An Anthology of Original Science Fiction and Fantasy (2005 and 2006, editor Sharyn November), with "I'll Give you My Word"
- Year's Best Fantasy 7 (2007, editors David G. Hartnell & Kathryn Cramer), with "I'll Give You My Word"
- Plokta May 2009 (2009, editors Steve Davies, Alison Scott, and Mike Scott), with "Samantha's Diary"
- The Dragon Book: Magical Tales from the Masters of Modern Fantasy (2009, editors Jack Dann and Gardner Dozois), with "JoBoy"
- The Best Science Fiction and Fantasy of the Year, Volume 4 (2010, editor Jonathan Strahan), with "JoBoy"
- Stories: All-New Tales (2010, editors Neil Gaiman and Al Sarrantonio), with "Samantha's Diary"
- Unnatural Creatures (2013, editor Neil Gaiman), with "The Sage of Theare"
- The Mammoth Book of Dark Magic (2013, editor Mike Ashley, alternate title The Mammoth Book of Black Magic, with "The Sage of Theare"
- Escape Pod, EP427 (2013, editor Norm Sherman), with "Samantha's Diary"

==== Complete list of short stories in alphabetical order ====
- "Auntie Bea's Day Out", found in Auntie Bea's Day Out (standalone, 1978), and The Cat Flap and the Apple Pie and Other Funny Stories (1979), and Warlock at the Wheel and Other Stories (1984), and Unexpected Magic: Collected Stories (2002), and Freaky Families (2013)
- "Carol Oneir's Hundredth Dream", found in Dragons & Dreams: A Collection of New Fantasy and Science Fiction Stories (1986), and Mixed Magics: Four Tales of Chrestomanci (2000), and The Wizards' Den: Spellbinding Stories of Magic & Magicians (2001 and 2003)
- "Carruthers", found in Young Winter's Tales 3 (1972), and Warlock at the Wheel and Other Stories (1984), and Unexpected Magic: Collected Stories (2002)
- "Chair Person", found in Things that Go Bump in the Night (1989), and Chair Person (stand alone 1989), and Stopping for a Spell (2002), and Vile Visitors (2012)
- "Dragon Reserve, Home Eight", found in Warlock at the Wheel and Other Stories (1984), and Dragons and Warrior Daughters: Fantasy Stories by Women Writers (1989), and Bruce Coville's UFOs (1994, 2000), and Everard's Ride (1995, republished 1997), and Minor Arcana (1996), and Believing is Seeing: Seven Stories (1999), and Unexpected Magic: Collected Stories (2002)
- "Enna Hittims", found in The Methuen Book of Humorous Stories (1987), and Believing is Seeing: Seven Stories (1999), and Unexpected Magic: Collected Stories (2002), and Enna Hittims (stand alone, 2006)
- "Everard's Ride", found in Everard's Ride (1995, republished 1997), and Unexpected Magic: Collected Stories (2002)
- "I'll Give You My Word", found in Firebirds Rising: An Anthology of Original Science Fiction and Fantasy (2005 and 2006, editor Sharyn November), and Year's Best Fantasy 7 (2007, editors David G. Hartnell & Kathryn Cramer)
- "JoBoy", found in The Dragon Book: Magical Tales from the Masters of Modern Fantasy (2009, editors Jack Dann and Gardner Dozois), and The Best Science Fiction and Fantasy of the Year, Volume 4 (2010, editor Jonathan Strahan)
- "Little Dot", found in Firebirds: An Anthology of Original Fantasy and Science Fiction (2003), and Unexpected Magic: Collected Stories (2002)
- "Mela Worms", in Arrows of Eros (1989), and Fenix, V3, #1, 1992 (1992, translation)
- "Nad and Dan adn Quaffy", found in Digital Dreams (1990), and Everard's Ride (1995, republished 1997), and Minor Arcana (1996), and Believing is Seeing: Seven Stories (1999), and Unexpected Magic: Collected Stories (2002)
- "No One", found in Warlock at the Wheel and Other Stories (1984), and Everard's Ride (1995, republished 1997), and Unexpected Magic: Collected Stories (2002)
- "Samantha's Diary", found in Plokta, May 2009 (2009), and Stories: All-New Tales (2010, editor Neil Gaiman), and Escape Pod, EP427 (2013)
- "Stealer of Souls", found in Mixed Magics: Four Tales of Chrestomanci (2000), Stealer of Souls stand alone (2000)
- "The Fat Wizard", found in Guardian Angels (1987), and A Treasury of Witches and Wizards, (1996, republished as The Kingfisher Treasury of Witch and Wizard Stories, 2004), and Unexpected Magic: Collected Stories (2002)
- "The Fluffy Pink Toadstool", found in Puffin Post v13 #4 (1979), and Warlock at the Wheel and Other Stories (1984), and Unexpected Magic: Collected Stories (2002)
- "The Four Grannies", found in The Four Grannies (standalone, 1980 and 1981), and in Stopping for a Spell (2002), and Freaky Families (2013)
- "The Green Stone", found in Gaslight and Ghosts (1988), and The Random House Book of Fantasy Stories (1997), and Unexpected Magic: Collected Stories (2002)
- "The Girl Jones", found in Unexpected Magic: Collected Stories (2002), and Reflections: On the Magic of Writing (2012)
- "The Girl Who Loved the Sun", found in Heartache (1990), and Minor Arcana (1996), and Believing is Seeing: Seven Stories (1999), and Unexpected Magic: Collected Stories (2002)
- "The Master", found in Hidden Turnings: A Collection of Stories Through Time and Space (1989), and Everard's Ride (1995, republished 1997), and Minor Arcana (1996), and Mystery Stories (1998), and Believing is Seeing: Seven Stories (1999), and Unexpected Magic: Collected Stories (2002)
- "The Plague of Peacocks", found in Warlock at the Wheel and Other Stories (1984), and Everard's Ride (1995, republished 1997), and Unexpected Magic: Collected Stories (2002)
- "The Sage of Theare", found in Hecate's Cauldron (1982), and Warlock at the Wheel and Other Stories (1984), and Minor Arcana (1996), and Believing is Seeing: Seven Stories (1999), and Mixed Magics: Four Tales of Chrestomanci (2000), and The Mammoth Book of Sorcerer's Tales: The Ultimate Collection of Magical Fantasy (2004), and Unnatural Creatures (2013), and The Mammoth Book of Dark Magic (2013, alternate title The Mammoth Book of Black Magic)
- "The True State of Affairs", found in Everard's Ride (1995, republished 1997), and Minor Arcana (1996)
- "Warlock at the Wheel", found in Warlock at the Wheel and Other Stories (1984), and Mixed Magics: Four Tales of Chrestomanci (2000)
- "What the Cat Told Me", found in Spellbound: Fantasy Stories (1995), and Minor Arcana (1996), and Believing is Seeing: Seven Stories (1999), and Unexpected Magic: Collected Stories (2002)
- "Who Got Rid of Angus Flint?", found in Young Winter's Tales 6 (1975), and Who Got Rid of Angus Flint? (stand alone, 1978), and Stopping for a Spell (2002), and Vile Visitors (2012)

== Plays ==
- The Batterpool Business (1968)
- The King's Things (1970)
- The Terrible Fisk Machine (1972)
- The Princess in the Sea (2024)

== Poetry ==
Diana Wynne Jones also wrote several short stories and poems that have been published in anthologies and in a collection.

- "A Slice of Life" found in Now We Are Sick: An Anthology of Nasty Verse (2005, Editors Neil Gaiman and Stephen Jones), a poetry anthology for adults
- Poems (2019, editor Isobel Armstrong)

== Nonfiction and humour ==
- The Skiver's Guide (1984)
- The Tough Guide to Fantasyland (1996) is presented as a travel guidebook for fictional worlds (a play on Rough Guides). Although borderline, ISFDB catalogues it as nonfiction. The US Library of Congress catalogues it as a dictionary. Hugo Award Nonfiction nominee; Locus Award, Nonfiction 3rd place; World Fantasy Award finalist. A revised edition was published in 2006.

== Nonfiction and essays ==
=== Interviews ===
- "Diana Wynne Jones: Writing for Children" (1989), in Locus #339 April 1989 (1989)
- "A Sudden Wild Mage: A Rough Guide to Diana Wynne Jones" (1997) by David V. Barrett, in Interzone, #117 March 1997 (1997)
- "Diana Wynne Jones" (2006) by Leonard S. Marcus, in The Wand in the Word: Conversations with Writers of Fantasy (2006)
- "An Excerpt from a Conversation with Diana Wynne Jones" by Catherine Butler, in Vector 268 (2011)

=== Reviews ===
- "The White Devil" (1988) by John Webster

=== Essays ===
- "The Shape of the Narrative in 'The Lord of the Rings'", found in Everard's Ride (1995 and 1997), and Reflections: On the Magic of Writing (2012)
- "Why Don't You Write Real Books?" (1987), in Vector 140 (1987) and Reflections: On the Magic of Writing (2012)
- "Introduction (Hidden Turnings)" (1989)
- letter in Vector #159 (1991)
- "Two Kinds of Writing?" (1990), in The Medusa: The Journal of the PJF 1 (1990), in Nexus #1, April 1991 (1991), and Reflections: On the Magic of Writing (2012)
- "Aiming for the Moon" (1993), in Focus, December/January 1994 (1994)
- "Introduction (Believing is Seeing: Seven Stories)" (1996)
- "Introduction (Minor Arcana (Diana Wynne Jones anthology)|Minor Arcana)" (1996)
- "Joan Aiken: Influences" (1997), in Secret City: Strange Tales of London (1997)
- letter in Ansible #134 (1998)
- letter in Ansible #155 (2000)
- letter in Ansible #182 (2002)
- letter in Ansible #183 (2002)
- "How I Came to Write this Guidebook (The Tough Guide to Fantasyland)" (2006)
- letter in Ansible #246 (2008)
- "Howl's Moving Castle: Book to Film (Nebula Awards Showcase 2008)" (2008), in Nebula Awards Showcase 2008 (2008)
- letter in Ansible #276 (2010)

=== Essay Collections ===
- Reflections: On the Magic of Writing (2012) - A collection of more than 25 papers including autobiographical tales, literary criticism, though about life and writing, and information about the origins of her books. Includes a foreword by Neil Gaiman, and an introduction and interview by Catherine Butler.
  - "Foreword" by Neil Gaiman
  - "Reflecting on Reflections" by Catherine Butler (as Charlie Butler)
  - "The Children in the Wood"
  - "The Shape of the Narrative in 'The Lord of the Rings'"
  - "Two Kinds of Writing?"
  - "When I Won the Guardian Award"
  - "Reading C. S. Lewis's Narnia"
  - "Creating the Experience"
  - "Fantasy Books for Children"
  - "The Value of Learning Anglo-Saxon"
  - "The Halloween Worms"
  - "A Day Visiting Schools"
  - "Writing for Children: A Matter of Responsibility"
  - "The Heroic Ideal: A Personal Odyssey"
  - "A Talk About Rules"
  - "Answers to Some Questions"
  - "Some Hints on Writing"
  - "A Whirlwind Tour of Australia"
    - "- Lecture One: Heroes"
    - "- Lecture Two: Negatives and Positives in Children's Literature"
    - "- Lecture Three: Why Don't You Write Real Books?"
  - "Inventing the Middle Ages"
  - "Some Truths About Writing"
  - "The Origins of 'The Merlin Conspiracy'"
  - "Review of "Boy in Darkness" by Mervyn Peake"
  - "- Freedom to Write"
  - "- Our Hidden Gifts"
  - "Characterization: Advice for Young Writers"
  - "Something About the Author"
  - "The Girl Jones"
  - "The Origins of 'Changeover'"
  - "A Conversation with Diana Wynne Jones"
  - "Two Family Views of Diana and Her Work"
  - "- Fantasies for Children"
  - "- Address at Diana's Funeral"
  - "Diana Wynne Jones Bibliography"

=== List of anthologies containing her essays and interviews ===
- Secret City: Strange Tales of London (1997, editors Stephen Jones and Jo Fletcher), with "Joan Aiken: Influences"
- The Wand in the Word: Conversations with Writers of Fantasy (2006, editor Leonard S. Marcus), with "Diana Wynne Jones" (2006) by Leonard S. Marcus - Interview
- Nebula Awards Showcase 2008 (2008, editor Ben Bova), with "Howl's Moving Castle: Book to Film (Nebula Awards Showcase 2008)"

== Entire bibliography in order of publication ==
=== 1960s ===
- The Batterpool Business (1968) - Play

=== 1970s ===
- Changeover (1970) - Adults
- The King's Things (1970) - Play
- The Terrible Fisk Machine (1972) - Play
- Young Winter's Tales 3 (1972, edited by M. R. Hodgkin), with "Carruthers" - Contributor
- Wilkins' Tooth (1973), US title: Witch's Business
- The Ogre Downstairs (1974)
- Young Winter's Tales 6 (1975, edited by M. R. Hodgkin), with "Who Got Rid of Angus Flint?" - Contributor
- Eight Days of Luke (1975)
- Dogsbody (1975)
- Cart and Cwidder (1975) – Dalemark
- Power of Three (1976)
- Charmed Life (1977) – Chrestomanci
- Drowned Ammet (1977) – Dalemark
- The Dalemark Quartet, Vol. 1: Cart and Cwidder & Drowned Ammet (1977) - Dalemark Compilation
- Young Winter's Tales 8 (1978, edited by D. J. Denney), with "Auntie Bea's Day Out" - Contributor
- Who Got Rid of Angus Flint? (1978)
- "The Fluffy Pink Toadstool", story in Puffin Post v13 #4 (1979)
- The Cat Flap and the Apple Pie and Other Funny Stories (1979, edited by Lance Salway), with "Auntie Bea's Day Out" - Contributor
- The Spellcoats (1979) – Dalemark

=== 1980s ===
- The Four Grannies (1980)
- The Magicians of Caprona (1980) – Chrestomanci
- The Time of the Ghost (1981)
- The Homeward Bounders (1981)
- Hecate's Cauldron (1982, editor Susan Schwartz), with "The Sage of Theare" - Contributor
- Witch Week (1982) – Chrestomanci
- Warlock at the Wheel and Other Stories (1984), collection
- Archer's Goon (1984)
- The Skiver's Guide (1984), nonfiction/humor
- Fire and Hemlock (1985)
- Dragons & Dreams: A Collection of New Fantasy and Science Fiction Stories (1986, editor Jane Yolen), with "Carol Oneir's Hundredth Dream" - Contributor
- Howl's Moving Castle (1986) – Howl's Castle
- "Why Don't You Write Real Books?" (1987) in Vector 140
- The Methuen Book of Humorous Stories (1987, editor Jennifer Kavanagh, illustrator Scowler Anderson), with "Enna Hittims" - Contributor
- Guardian Angels (1987, editor Stephanie Nuttell, Viking Kestrel), with "The Fat Wizard" - Contributor
- A Tale of Time City (1987)
- Gaslight and Ghosts (1988, editors Stephen Jones and Jo Fletcher) with "The Green Stone"
- The Lives of Christopher Chant (1988) – Chrestomanci
- Review: The White Devil (1988) by John Webster
- Things that Go Bump in the Night (1989, editors Jane Yolen and Martin Harry Greenberg), with "Chair Person" - Contributor
- Chair Person (1989)
- Wild Robert (1989)
- Hidden Turnings, edited (1989), with "The Master" - Anthology, Contributor
- Arrows of Eros (1989, editor Alex Stewart), with "Mela Worms" - Contributor
- Dragons and Warrior Daughters: Fantasy Stories by Women Writers (1989, editor Jessica Yates), with "Dragon Reserve, Home Eight" - Contributor
- Locus #339 April 1989 (1989, editor Charles N. Brown), with "Diana Wynne Jones: Writing for Children" (1989) - Interview

=== 1990s ===
- Digital Dreams (1990, editor David V. Barrett), with "Nad and Dan adn Quaffy" - Contributor
- Heartache (1990, editor Miriam Hodgson, Methuen), with "The Girl Who Loved the Sun" - Contributor
- Castle in the Air (1990) – Howl's Castle
- Wizard's Castle (1990) - Howl's Castle Compilation
- Black Maria (1991)
- letter in Vector #159 (1991)
- Nexus #1, April 1991 (1991, editor Paul Brazier), with "Two Kinds of Writing" (1991) - Essay Contributor
- Now We Are Sick: An Anthology of Nasty Verse (1991, 1994, 2005, Editors Neil Gaiman and Stephen Jones), with "A Slice of Life" - Poetry for Adults, Contributor
- Yes, Dear (1992)
- A Sudden Wild Magic (1992), novel for adults
- "Mela Worms", story in translation in Fenix, V3, #1, (1992, editor Rafal A. Ziemkiewicz)
- Hexwood (1993)
- Crown of Dalemark (1993) – Dalemark
- Focus, December/January 1993 (1993, editors Julie Venner and Carol Ann Green), with "Aiming for the Moon" - Essay Contributor
- The Dalemark Quartet, Vol. 2: The Spellcoats & The Crown of Dalemark (1993) - Dalemark compilation
- The Dalemark Quartet (1993) - Dalemark compilation
- Stopping for a Spell (1993), collection
- Bruce Coville's UFOs (1994, 2000, edited by Bruce Coville), with "Dragon Reserve, Home Eight" - Contributor
- Everard's Ride (1995) - Collection
- Spellbound: Fantasy Stories, edited (1995), with "What the Cat Told Me" - Anthology, Contributor
- Minor Arcana (1996) - Collection
- "The Fat Wizard", story in A Treasury of Witches and Wizards (1996, editor David Bennett), republished as The Kingfisher Treasury of Witch and Wizard Stories (2004)
- The Tough Guide to Fantasyland (1996) - Nonfiction/humor
- Secret City: Strange Tales of London (1997, editors Stephen Jones and Jo Fletcher), with "Joan Aiken: Influences" - Essay Contributor
- Interzone, #117 March 1997 (1997, editor David Pringle) "A Sudden Wild Mage: A Rough Guide to Diana Wynne Jones" (1997) by David V. Barrett - Interview
- The Random House Book of Fantasy Stories (1997, editor Mike Ashley), alternate title Fantasy Stories with "The Green Stone" - Contributor
- Deep Secret (1997) – Magids, Adults
- letter in Ansible #134 (1998)
- Mystery Stories (1998, editor Helen Cresswell), with "The Master" - Contributor
- Dark Lord of Derkholm (1998) – Derkholm
- The Worlds of Chrestomanci (Chrestomanci # 1-4) (1998) - Chrestomanci Compilation
- Puss in Boots (1999)
- Believing is Seeing (1999), collection

=== 2000s ===
- Year of the Griffin (2000) – Derkholm
- Mixed Magics: Four Tales of Chrestomanci (2000), collection – Chrestomanci
- Stealer of Souls (2000) – Chrestomanci
- letter in Ansible #155 (2000)
- The Chronicles of Chrestomanci Volume 1 (2001) - Chrestomanci compilation
- The Chronicles of Chrestomanci Volume 2 (2001) - Chrestomanci compilation
- The Wizards' Den: Spellbinding Stories of Magic & Magicians (2001 and 2003, editor Peter Haining), with "Carol Oneir's Hundredth Dream" - Contributor
- Unexpected Magic (2002), collection
- letter in Ansible #182 (2002)
- letter in Ansible #183 (2002)
- Wizard's Castle (2002) - Howl's Castle compilation (Illustrated by Anne Yvonne Gilbert)
- Firebirds: An Anthology of Original Fantasy and Science Fiction (2003, editor Sharyn November) with "Little Dot" - Contributor
- The Merlin Conspiracy (2003) – Magids
- The Dalemark Quartet (2003) - Dalemark compilation (Illustrated by Anne Yvonne Gilbert)
- The Mammoth Book of Sorcerer's Tales: The Ultimate Collection of Magical Fantasy (2004, editor Mike Ashley), with "The Sage of Theare" - Contributor
- Firebirds Rising: An Anthology of Original Science Fiction and Fantasy (2005 and 2006, editor Sharyn November), with "I'll Give you My Word" - Contributor
- Conrad's Fate (2005) – Chrestomanci
- The Tough Guide to Fantasyland: Revised and Updated Edition (2006)
- The Wand in the Word: Conversations with Writers of Fantasy (2006, editor Leonard S. Marcus), with "Diana Wynne Jones" (2006) by Leonard S. Marcus - Interview
- The Pinhoe Egg (2006) – Chrestomanci
- Enna Hittims (2006), Illustrated by Peter Utton
- Year's Best Fantasy 7 (2007, editors David G. Hartnell & Kathryn Cramer), with "I'll Give You My Word" - Contributor
- The Game (2007)
- The Chronicles of Chrestomanci Volume 3 (2008) - Chrestomanci compilation
- House of Many Ways (2008) – Howl's Castle
- letter in Ansible #246 (2008)
- Nebula Awards Showcase 2008 (2008, editor Ben Bova), with "Howl's Moving Castle: Book to Film (Nebula Awards Showcase 2008)" - Essay Contributor
- The Dragon Book: Magical Tales from the Masters of Modern Fantasy (2009, editors Jack Dann and Gardner Dozois), with "JoBoy" - Contributor
- Plokta, May 2009 (2009, editors Steve Davies, Alison Scott, and Mike Scott), with Samantha's Diary - Contributor

=== 2010s ===
- Enchanted Glass (2010)
- The Best Science Fiction and Fantasy of the Year, Volume 4 (2010, editor Jonathan Strahan) with "JoBoy" - Contributor
- Stories: All-New Tales (2010, editors Neil Gaiman and Al Sarrantonio), with "Samantha's Diary" - Contributor
- letter in Ansible #276 (2010)

=== Posthumous publications ===
- Earwig and the Witch (2011), illustrated by Paul O. Zelinsky
- "An Excerpt from a Conversation with Diana Wynne Jones" by Catherine Butler, in Vector 268 (2011)
- Reflections: On the Magic of Writing, (2011) - nonfiction
- Diana Wynne Jones Chrestomanci 6 Books Collection (2012) - Chrestomanci compilation
- Vile Visitors (2012) - young readers compilation
- Unnatural Creatures (2013, editor Neil Gaiman), with "The Sage of Theare" - Contributor
- The Mammoth Book of Dark Magic (2013 editor Mike Ashley, alternate title The Mammoth Book of Black Magic), with "The Sage of Theare" - Contributor
- Escape Pod, EP427 (2013, editor Norm Sherman), with "Samantha's Diary" - Contributor
- The Chrestomanci Series: Entire Collection Books 1-7 (2013) - Chrestomanci compilation
- Freaky Families (2013) - young readers compilation
- The Islands of Chaldea, co-authored by her sister Ursula Jones (2014)
- The Chrestomanci Series: Books 1-3 (2014) - Chrestomanci compilation
- World of Howl Collection (2014) - Howl compilation
- Diana Wynne Jones's Fantastical Journeys Collection (2015) - compilation
- Diana Wynne Jones's Magic and Myths Collection (2015) - compilation
- Poems (2019, editor Isobel Armstrong)
- Stage Magic: 4 Plays and a Screenplay (2024) - compilation
