= Deep Secret =

Fantasy novel by Diana Wynne Jones

- First edition
- Author: Diana Wynne Jones
- Cover artist: Peter Mennim
- Series: Magids
- Genre: Fantasy
- Publisher: Victor Gollancz Ltd
- Publication date: November 1997
- Publication place: United Kingdom
- Media type: Print (hardcover)
- Pages: 383 (first eds. UK and US)
- ISBN: 0-575-06479-X
- OCLC: 37976373
- LC Class: PR6060.O497 D44 1999
- Followed by: The Merlin Conspiracy

Deep Secret is a fantasy novel by Diana Wynne Jones, published by Gollancz in 1997. It is the first in the Magids series.

== Plot summary ==
The book's first narrator is Rupert Venables, the junior "magid" responsible for Earth and the Koryfonic Empire, a collection of Ayewards worlds. The multiverse contains Ayeward (generally good, pro-magic) and Nayward (the opposite) worlds. It is the task of the magids to urge the worlds in an Ayewards direction. When the Emperor of the Koryfonic Empire is assassinated, no heir can be found. Earth's senior magid has also died, and Rupert must find his replacement.

Venables draws the candidates for Earth senior magid together in an unlikely place: a science fiction convention in the town of Wantchester. Maree Mallory, the book's second narrator, is one of the candidates. Maree's Uncle Ted is to be the guest of honor at the convention in Wantchester. Ted's wife Janine, Maree, and Ted and Janine's son Nick are to accompany him.

All arrive at the convention, where the reserved Venables is somewhat stunned at the bizarre nature of the convention and its attendees, particularly as it is housed in the strange, Escher-like Hotel Babylon, which appears to be centered on a powerful magical node. He seeks out each magid candidate, but is disappointed to find each of them entirely unsuitable. His opinion of Maree Mallory rises, however, as they encounter each other several times at the convention.

Pleas for help from the unsettled Koryfonic Empire force Venables to cross over to the Ayewards world Thule to seek help from his magid brother Will. Maree and Nick unwittingly follow him through the gaps between worlds, nearly killing themselves in the process. The plot culminates with a trip into a bizarre, nightmarish land whose existence is the "Deep Secret" of the title, and the restoration of the Koryfonic Empire to its rightful ruler after his memory is restored.

== Reception ==
Maria Nikolajeva in her article “Fairy Tale and Fantasy: from Archaic to Postmodern” discusses the novel’s depiction of the use of “a higher authority to govern a multitude of related worlds.” In the same article Nikolajeva also compares Deep Secret to Wynne Jones’s novels A Tale of Time City, The Homeward Bounders, and Hexwood.
