= Power of Three (novel) =

1976 fantasy children's novel by Diana Wynne Jones

- First edition
- Author: Diana Wynne Jones
- Cover artist: Martin Caulkin
- Language: English
- Genre: Children's fantasy novel
- Publisher: Macmillan
- Publication date: 1976
- Publication place: United Kingdom
- Media type: Print (hardback and paperback)

Power of Three is a 1976 fantasy children's novel by Diana Wynne Jones. The novel, a Bildungsroman for the adolescent character Gair, discusses the relationship among three different races in a manner that can be read as a parable of race relations in humans.

== Plot summary ==
The story begins when two Lyman siblings, Orban and Adara, accidentally revert a shapeshifted bird on an English moor back into a small Dorig. The Dorig is holding an exquisitely moulded collar, which in Lyman and Dorig culture are used to store protective magic. When Orban tries to take the collar, the Dorig says he is the son of the Dorig king, and will curse the collar before giving it up. Orban kills the Dorig and takes the collar anyway, and as the Dorig dies he binds a curse to the collar by the three Powers – the Old Power, the Middle Power and the New Power.

Orban grows up to be chief of the Otmound mound. Adara marries Gest, chief of the Garholt mound, and has three children: Ayna, Gair, and Ceri. At a young age, Ayna and Ceri discover they have powerful magical talents called "Gifts" – Ayna has precognition, and Ceri can find anything when asked. Gair, the middle child, becomes increasingly gloomy when he fails to develop a Gift.

When Gair is twelve, the Dorig – at war with the Lyman ever since Orban killed the prince – flood the Otmound mound. The Otmounders move into the Garholt mound, bringing with them bad luck which gets worse and worse.

Ayna, Ceri, and Gair are exploring the moors one day when they come across two young Giants, whom the siblings follow back to their house. When they are discovered, a cultural exchange takes place. The Giants inform them that there are plans to flood the moor to provide drinking water for England.

The siblings, the Giants, and two Dorigs must work together to stop the Moor from being destroyed. The bad luck is found to be emanating from the collar Orban had stolen from the Dorig prince, still strongly cursed. The three races can deactivate it together, or not at all.

It turns out that Gair is not so ordinary as he had expected himself to be. His fame grew later throughout the Moor and was known for his magnificent collar, of the finest Dorig work. He was also known to have the rarest Gift of all, and that is the Gift of Sight Unasked.

== Species ==
Three different species live on the Moor:

- Lymen live in villages inside huge, hollow mounds. They fear the Giants and are at war with the Dorig. They operate their magic/technology with Words. They are warlike and like hunting, but they usually will not kill unless they have to. A few have special attributes called Gifts which enable them to use a special magical skill (e.g. see the future). Their clothes are the colour of the Moor, so they can camouflage with the long grasses, shadows, and trees. They look like humans, but are a little smaller, thinner, and have almond-shaped eyes which are the same colour as a human's. Their Power comes from the Sun, the Middle Power.
- Dorig live in halls under water. They have airlocks and working pumps. They, too, fear the Giants and they are at war with the Lymen. The Dorig have only the barest minimum of knowledge about Words and do not seem to have Gifts, but can shapeshift. They are rather peaceful, but are not reluctant to kill. Their real clothes are soft, and made of fish-skins that are prepared to shift shape along with the Dorig that is wearing them. When Dorig come to the surface, they don a hard, scaly armour that covers them head to foot and also shifts shape along with them. They are as tall as Lymen, very pale with a greenish tinge to their skin, and have large, yellow eyes. Their accent has a lilting sound, and they trail their s's. Their Power comes from the Moon, the Old Power.
- Giants are humans. They have machines that work by themselves, great big pieces of metal that smell bad and take them where they want, great strength, loud voices, boxes that release sound, and objects which they use to fire stone-like round things that can hurt or kill. The Lymen and the Dorig fear them, but the humans are unaware of the Lymen and Dorig. They wear many-coloured clothes with much decoration that fasten in "mysterious ways" (zippers). Their Power comes from the Earth, the New Power.

== Characters ==
The main characters of this book are three Lymen siblings: Ayna, Ceri and Gair. Both Ayna and Ceri are blessed with "Gifts". Ayna can tell the future, and Ceri can find anything that has been lost and can put thoughts on people. Putting thoughts on people is like controlling someone or something's actions by putting a hex on it. Gair is supposedly without a Gift but later on is revealed to have one.

Other characters include:

- Adara is a mother of Ayna, Ceri and Gair. She is said to be very wise and beautiful.
- Gest is a father of Ayna, Ceri and Gair. He is chief of Garholt, which is the biggest mound. He is often called a Hero, and is known for being charismatic and unique. He mysteriously completed three tasks to win Adara's hand in marriage.
- Orban is Adara's brother anx uncle to Ayna, Ceri and Gair. He is chief of the Otmound mound.
- Ondo is Orban's son and cousin to Ayna, Ceri and Gair. The three kids hate him for being an obnoxious bully. His distinguishing feature are ears that stick out like a sheep's.
- Kasta is Orban's wife, and the spoiling mother of Ondo. She is known for having a voice like a duck's.
- Gerald is a giant that tries to help the threesome. He and Gair are particularly good friends, because they can relate to one another. They are both rather lonely and melancholy.
- Brenda is another, very fat, giant. She and Gerald are fighting when the threesome first meet them.
- Hafny is a Dorig that Ayna, Ceri and Gair befriend. He is much more open-minded than most Dorigs, and occupies roughly the same place in Dorig society as Gair does in Lymen society.
- Halla is Hafny's sister and has a tendency to be rather unintelligent and stereotypically minded.
