= John Burrow (literary scholar) =

British medievalist

John Anthony Burrow, FBA (3 August 1932 – 22 October 2017) was a British scholar of English literature. He was Winterstoke Professor of English at the University of Bristol from 1976 to 1998 and Dean of its Faculty of Arts from 1990 to 1993.

The only child of an accountant and a teacher, Burrow was born and raised in Loughton, Essex. He matriculated at Christ Church, Oxford in 1950 to read English. After lecturing at King's College, London and for various Oxford colleges, he was elected a fellow of Jesus College, Oxford in 1961. In 1976, he moved to the University of Bristol, where he remained until his retirement in 1998.

Burrow was married to the novelist Diana Wynne Jones.

== Sources ==
- https://www.thebritishacademy.ac.uk/documents/955/Memoirs_18-04-Burrow_0.pdf
- https://www.oxfordmail.co.uk/news/15633223.obituary-literary-scholar-prof-john-burrow/
- Turville-Petre, Thorlac (29 October 2017). "John Burrow obituary". The Guardian.
- Meale, Carol M. (2018). "In Memoriam: John Anthony Burrow (1932–2017)". The Chaucer Review. 53 (3): 249–251. doi:10.5325/chaucerrev.53.3.0249. S2CID 165984709. Project MUSE 698329.
- Edwards, A. S. G. (July 2018). "The Publications of John Burrow, 1997–2017". The Chaucer Review. 53 (3): 252–257. doi:10.5325/chaucerrev.53.3.0252. S2CID 165799662.
