= Catherine Butler =

English academic and author of children's fiction

- Born: Charles Cadman Butler; 25 January 1963 (age 63); Romsey, Hampshire, England
- Education: University of London; University of York
- Occupations: Professor, Cardiff University

Catherine Butler (born 25 January 1963 in Romsey, Hampshire; formerly Charles Cadman Butler) is an English academic and author of children's fiction.

Butler's most important academic work, Four British fantasists : place and culture in the children's fantasies of Penelope Lively, Alan Garner, Diana Wynne Jones, and Susan Cooper won the Mythopoeic Fantasy Award (2009) in the Mythopoeic Scholarship category and is in 236 libraries according to WorldCat, and has been reviewed in the standard book review sources and academic journals. Another academic work, Teaching Children's Fiction is in 148 libraries. Of Butler's fiction, Timon's Tide is the most widely held and reviewed: over 300 libraries & reviews. Among her other fiction, Death of a Ghost, The Fetch of Mardy Watt, Calypso Dreaming, The Lurkers, are each in about 100 libraries and with journal reviews.

== Other publications ==
Butler's works include:

- As Charles Butler:
  - Female Replies to Swetnam the Woman-Hater, ed. (Thoemmes, 1995)
  - The Darkling (Orion, 1997)
  - Timon's Tide (Orion, 1998)
  - Calypso Dreaming (HarperCollins, 2002)
  - The Fetch of Mardy Watt (HarperCollins, 2004)
  - Death of a Ghost (HarperCollins, 2006)
  - The Lurkers (Usborne, 2006)
  - Teaching Children's Fiction, ed. (Palgrave Macmillan, 2006)
  - Four British Fantasists: Place and Culture in the Children's Fantasies of Penelope Lively, Alan Garner, Diana Wynne Jones, and Susan Cooper (Scarecrow, 2006)
  - Kiss of Death (Barrington Stoke, 2007)
  - Hand of Blood (Barrington Stoke, 2009)

- As Catherine Butler:
  - Reading History in Children's Books, with Hallie O'Donovan (Palgrave Macmillan, 2012)
  - Roald Dahl: A New Casebook, ed. with Ann Alston (Palgrave Macmillan, 2012)
  - Twisted Winter, ed. (A & C Black, 2013)
  - Philip Pullman: A New Casebook, ed. with Tommy Halsdorf (Palgrave Macmillan, 2014)
  - Modern Children's Literature: An Introduction, ed. with Kimberley Reynolds (Palgrave Macmillan, 2014)
  - Literary Studies Deconstructed: A Polemic, (Palgrave Macmillan, 2018)
  - British Children's Literature in Japanese Culture: Wonderlands and Looking-Glasses, (Bloomsbury, 2023)
