= The Time of the Ghost =

1981 children's novel by Diana Wynne Jones

- First edition
- Author: Diana Wynne Jones
- Language: English
- Genre: Children's fantasy novel, ghost story, mystery
- Publisher: Macmillan
- Publication date: 1981
- Publication place: United Kingdom
- Media type: Print (hardcover)
- Pages: 304 pp (first edition)
- ISBN: 0-333-32012-3
- OCLC: 315623481
- LC Class: PZ7.J684 Ti 1996

The Time of the Ghost is a supernatural English-language children's novel by Diana Wynne Jones, published by Macmillan in 1981. Set in the English countryside, it features a teenage ghost who is one of four sisters, and observes the family, unable to remember which one she is. She is from seven years in the future, in the aftermath of her "accident", so it is a kind of a time slip story, but she has no memories of those seven years.

Greenwillow Books (William Morrow) published the first US edition only in 1996.

== Plot summary ==
The book begins with the words "There's been an accident! Something's wrong!" – and something is. There is a ghost. She does not know who she is, or how she died, or quite where she is. All she knows is that there has been a terrible accident.

The as-yet unnamed heroine finds herself attracted to a large building, a boys' boarding school, which she finds to be strangely familiar. After a little detective work, the disembodied spirit concludes that she is Sally Melford, one of a quartet of eccentric sisters (Imogen, Cart, Fenella and Sally) who live at the school and are neglected by their overworked parents, both of whom teach at the school. Their father, only known as himself, is the headmaster, and his wife, Phyllis, is the school nurse. Both of them are constantly busy with school business, and leave their daughters to fend for themselves.

As the plot continues, evidence of time-travel begins to emerge. In the present day, the adult, university-age Sally is in a hospital, badly injured after her abusive boyfriend threw her from a speeding car. Some part of her has journeyed back seven years into the past, where, with the help of her sisters and their schoolboy friends, she must undo a rash bargain with the powerful and ancient goddess, Monigan.

The Worship of Monigan is a game that the sisters made up, in which an old rag doll supposedly represents the goddess Monigan. Throughout the story, the sisters vary from treating the Worship of Monigan as a game to believing in it quite seriously. Sally also seems to be romantically involved with a student at the school, the enigmatic fifth-former Julian Addiman, who mocks how the sisters seem to take the Worship of Monigan very seriously.

After a deal of detective work, Sally (in her ghostly form) discovers the truth. The young Sally had dedicated herself to Monigan in a midnight ritual, with the help of Julian. Monigan had taken her up on the offer, and had agreed that Sally would be hers in seven years' time. The seven years are now up, and Monigan had attempted to call in the debt, in the form of the boyfriend (now revealed to be the same Julian Addiman) tossing her out of the car. Sally survived, however, and with the help of her sisters and her childhood friends, she is determined to cheat Monigan, and take back her life.

== Characters ==
Selina (Sally) Melford is the main protagonist of the book. She is considered by her sisters as being the most sentimental. Her nickname is Semolina.

Charlotte (Cart) Melford is one of Sally's four sisters. As a teenager, she is fat and unattractive to boys, but in the future-part of the book, she has turned into a thin and beautiful young woman. She is the least emotional, and has little time for sentimentality, but she is often prone to being aggressive, particularly in the mornings.

Fenella Melford is the youngest Melford sister, who is also the most eccentric. Her preferred mode of dress is a green sack, made by Cart; she has knots tied in her hair, and large buck teeth with a gap between them. She is portrayed as small and gnome like, but, like Cart, in the future-part of the book, she is very beautiful, and is training to become an opera singer.

Imogen (Imo) Melford is the most career-oriented; she is utterly focused on her planned career as a concert pianist. She is also shown as the most attractive ("angelic") of the sisters, but in the future-part, she has turned into a drab young woman, stuck doing something she does not really want to do.

Julian Addiman is a fifth-former at the school, who is very good at getting his own way. He is handsome, and uses this to great effect, especially when dealing with Cart and Sally, who are both very attracted to him, but is controlling and abusive towards Sally, and ends up throwing her out of a speeding car.
