= The Game (Jones novel) =

Fantasy novel by Diana Wynne Jones

- First edition (US)
- Author: Diana Wynne Jones
- Cover artist: Rick Berry
- Language: English
- Genre: Children's, Fantasy, high fantasy
- Publisher: Firebird Books (US); HarperCollins (UK)
- Publication date: 2007 (US); 2008 (UK)
- Publication place: United States, United Kingdom
- Media type: Print (hardback (US), paperback, UK)
- Pages: 192
- ISBN: 0-14-240718-6
- OCLC: 71126883
- LC Class: PZ7.J684 Gam 2007

The Game is a children's fantasy novel written by Diana Wynne Jones. It explores a young girl's life and her relation to the "Mythosphere". This book pulls heavily from Greek and even some Russian mythology.

== Plot ==
Hayley's parents disappeared when she was a baby. Since then, she has been raised and homeschooled by her grandparents. Grandad is overworked and travels a lot; Grandma is much too strict and never lets her meet any children her own age. When Hayley does something wrong—she is not quite sure what—they pack her off to her aunts in Ireland. To Hayley's shock, the number of people in her family is much larger than she thought; to her delight, the children all play what they call "the game", where they visit a place called "the mythosphere". While she plays the game, Hayley learns more about her own place in the world than she had ever expected.

Hayley encounters various mythological figures during the course of her adventures in the mythosphere, including Actaeon and Baba Yaga.

== Characters ==
- Hayley (Halley's Comet)
- Grandpa (Atlas (mythology))
- Grandma (Pleione (mythology))
- Flute
- Fiddle
- Uncle Jolyon (Zeus/Jupiter (god))
- Cousin Mercer (Hermes/Mercury (mythology))

6 aunts who are the Pleiades:

- Aunt May (Maia)
- Aunt Ellie (Electra (Pleiad))
- Aunt Alice (Alcyone (Pleiad))
- Aunt Geta (Taygete)
- Aunt Celia (Celaeno (Pleiad))
- Aunt Aster (Asterope (Greek myth))
- Merope (Pleiad), Hayley's mother
- Cousin Troy (founder of the famous city)
- Cousin Harmony (Harmonia)
- Cousin Tollie (Autolycus)
- More cousins
- 5 aunts who are the Hesperides
- Sisyphus, Hayley's father
- Martya (Baba Yaga)
- Orion (mythology)
