= The Ogre Downstairs =

Book by Diana Wynne Jones

- First edition
- Author: Diana Wynne Jones
- Cover artist: Juliet Stanwell Smith
- Language: English
- Genre: Fantasy, children's literature
- Publisher: Macmillan
- Publication date: 1974
- Publication place: Great Britain
- Media type: Print
- ISBN: 0-06-447350-3
- OCLC: 48984549

The Ogre Downstairs is a 1974 fantasy novel for children. It is British author Diana Wynne Jones' third published novel.

== Plot summary ==
When their mother Sally remarries, Caspar and Johnny Brent dislike their new stepfather, Jack McIntyre, though their younger sister, Gwinny, is less judgmental. Jack brings two sons of his own, Douglas and Malcolm, with him and the two sets of siblings do not get along. Tensions are increased by the small house in which the seven live. Jack himself proves to be prone to harsh comments, and Johnny soon dubs him "the Ogre".

The Ogre buys chemistry sets, one each for Johnny and Malcolm. It is not too long before the children discover that some of the chemicals have magical properties. Douglas and Malcolm discover this after Johnny accidentally makes Gwinny fly, and a race begins between the two groups to find out which chemicals are magic. Caspar, Johnny, and Gwinny go flying, but the effect wears off away from home. Douglas has had to visit the mysterious store the chemistry sets came from to find out the antidote for a chemical which has turned Malcolm small, and they are able to attract his attention. He assists them in getting home, but the effect wears off again as they approach, which leaves Douglas stranded outside the house. Douglas (the oldest of the boys, perhaps fifteen) is caught by the Ogre, who assumes he has been sneaking out, and strikes him. The Ogre also strikes Johnny and Malcolm later in the book.

The other chemicals can do interesting things too, and the misadventures forge a bond among the children, as well as a common front against the Ogre. One chemical causes Malcolm's mind to enter Caspar's body, and vice versa. They spend a miserable day in each other's place before Douglas detects the substitution and figures out how to switch them back; the experience causes them to understand each other a little better.

The poor relations between the Ogre and the children cause bitter arguments between him and Sally, which culminates in her departure (it is later learned that she intends to send for the children as soon as she has a new place of her own). The Ogre lies about why Sally has left, pretending things are fine between them. This leads the children to assume, thinking the worst of him, that the Ogre has done away with Sally.

Fearing that the Ogre has killed her mother, and upset about his actions, Gwinny decides to kill the Ogre by baking him a cake filled with poison. She includes chemicals from the set, which, after she leaves it for the Ogre, turn the cake invisible. When Gwinny sees the cake "gone", and hears the Ogre making noises in his sleep, she assumes her scheme succeeded and is filled with remorse. She awakens the snoring Ogre, and confesses that she has poisoned him. She then realises that the cake has not been eaten, but is simply invisible because of the chemicals. The Ogre assumes that much of this is childish nightmares, and talks to her for a while before sending her to bed, promising the girl that he will work on trying to understand the children better.

Johnny's attempt on the Ogre's life is less subtle. He has also discovered invisibility, and uses it to try to kill the Ogre with a falling vacuum cleaner. The children realise Johnny has gone too far and save the Ogre's life, though he does not fully realise his danger. Johnny also tries to make it look like the Ogre has killed him and disposed of his body, but his attempt is frustrated by Caspar and Douglas. The Ogre does realise Johnny is not to be seen, and Caspar claims he has run away to a distant aunt. The Ogre has Caspar get in the car with the stated intent of driving to the aunt's house where Johnny has supposedly gone.

It turns out that the Ogre has taken Caspar to question him, since Caspar, as the Ogre puts it, is the worst liar he knows. The Ogre clearly heard Johnny's voice in the house, and knows he could not have run away. Caspar soon tells all, from the magic chemistry sets to Johnny's attempt on the Ogre's life. The Ogre is convinced by one of Caspar's fingers, which Johnny's experiments have turned partially invisible. At the end of the talk they also understand each other a bit better, and the Ogre realises the effect his behaviour is having. The two drive home to find Johnny slowly regaining visibility – he is being forced outside into the rain by the others, as water is the antidote to that chemical. The Ogre takes Johnny for a long talk behind closed doors, at the end of which the Ogre looks tired and Johnny looks smug.

Sally is located at a relative's home, and she is persuaded to return. The Ogre then returns the chemistry sets to the mysterious store from which they came. After the Ogre and the children clean the house, and following one more adventure at the supermarket with chemicals the children held back, Sally returns. One more chemical, however, remained and this one turns base metal into gold. This generates enough gold that allows them to buy a larger house, and the tensions dissipate. The children run wild in the new house as they realise the Ogre's bark is worse than his bite.

== Reception and reviews ==
Author Neil Gaiman, when reading the last chapter of this book aloud to his daughter, realised to his amusement that the "classical Greek" spoken by the Hells Angels who sprout in the supermarket parking lot turns out to be colloquial English when the Greek letters are sounded out.

In an essay exploring an ordinary human being with human frailties, one of which is intolerance of the chaos that living with children brings, and simultaneously, the Ogre realises his actions are causing the children to perceive him as a brute. Gross concludes that The Ogre Downstairs' ultimate theme is "the transformation of a difficult and chaotic family situation into one of greater maturity and acceptance; the chemistry sets themselves are agents of this change, this alchemical transformation".
