= Dogsbody (novel) =

1975 children's novel by Diana Wynne Jones

- First edition
- Author: Diana Wynne Jones
- Cover artist: Derek Collard
- Language: English
- Genre: Children's fantasy
- Publisher: Macmillan Publishers (UK); Greenwillow Books (US)
- Publication date: 1975
- Publication place: United Kingdom
- Media type: Print (hardback & paperback)
- Pages: 191 or 239
- ISBN: 0333187911
- OCLC: 47813078

Dogsbody is a 1975 children's novel by British writer Diana Wynne Jones, first published by Macmillan. It tells the story of Sirius, a star who is forced to live in the body of a dog on Earth. The book was Wynne Jones' fifth full-length novel (published the same year as her fourth and sixth novels, Cart and Cwidder and Eight Days of Luke).

== Plot ==
Sirius, "guardian luminary" of the Dog Star, is accused of murdering a fellow luminary and losing the Zoi, an extremely powerful cosmic tool, on Earth. His Companion gives evidence that he is guilty. He is sentenced to spend one lifetime in the form of a dog on Earth. If he can recover the Zoi within that dog's lifetime, he will be allowed to return to his former status as Sirius. If he does not, he will simply die at the end of his dog's life.

Sirius is born into a litter of puppies. Discovered to be mongrels, the puppies are thrown into the river. Kathleen O'Brien, rescues a filthy, wet, dying Sirius, and names him Leo. Kathleen lives with the Duffields, a family of four, because her father is in prison. Kathleen is treated distantly but benignly by Mr. Duffield, while his wife Daphne ("Duffie"), a potter, bullies and intimidates Kathleen as Kathleen is Irish, and forces her to do menial work. The Duffields' sons are Basil, who does not actively dislike Kathleen but often mimics his mother's behavior and is obsessed with meteorites, particularly one that fell recently near the town; and Robin, who is kind but afraid of the other family members. The family has three cats who grudgingly befriend Sirius. Sirius' status in the house is often fraught, as Duffie despises him and Kathleen's meager allowance is his sole source of food.

Sirius is aided by the luminary Sol in his quest to find the Zoi. He sets out to explore the town, finding people to feed him, including Miss Smith, a kind retired teacher. Sirius begins to befriend other dogs, particularly Bruce, Patchie, Rover, and Redears, who are Sirius' litter-mates. He meets Yeff, a "cold dog", who resembles Sirius and his littermates, and is the only one besides Patchie and Sirius able to hear a strange, high call. He runs off after telling Sirius that the sound is "the Master" whistling, and "only those who run with [the cold dogs] and share [their] duties are allowed to know" about the Master.

Sirius unknowingly stumbles across the women who tried to drown him as a puppy. He flees when one of them proves to be his former Companion. While Sol distracts her, Sirius escapes with the help of Earth. He realizes while he doted over his Companion as a luminary, she is as cruel as Duffie, and plotted against him. Earth reveals that the Master is in possession of the Zoi, although he does not know how to use it. Sirius' former Companion and New-Sirius (the luminary who took over Sirius' position), find and try to kill him. He escapes, helped by Moon, and sees the cold dogs again.

Kathleen is informed that her father is dead. She flies into a rage, destroying Duffie's pottery. Duffie beats her, but Sirius intervenes, biting her. Enraged, Duffie demands to have Sirius put down. Kathleen pretends to take him to be euthanised. Once out of the house, Sirius leads Kathleen to Miss Smith, who takes the girl in. Robin and Basil find Kathleen at Miss Smith's; the three commiserate. Night falls and Sirius slips away to run with the cold dogs, joined by Bruce, Patchie, Rover and Redears. The three children discover Sirius is missing and pursue the five dogs only to follow the pack of cold dogs into nothingness.

The eight humans and dogs meet the Master. He questions Sirius about the Zoi and allows each visitor to ask a boon. Robin gets a puppy, and Kathleen asks to understand her dog, but as Sirius is not technically a dog this does not work. Basil asks for the "meteorite" that is the Zoi. To Basil and Sirius's horror, the Master hands the Zoi to Kathleen instead. She has an intuitive understanding of how the Zoi works. The Companion and New-Sirius appear to kill Sirius, and Kathleen destroys them with the Zoi. Sirius manages to get the Zoi away from her, turns into his luminary self, and finds that his dog body is dead. He reluctantly returns to his sphere, leaving Kathleen behind.

Restored to his sphere, Sirius begins his old life, although he refuses to find a replacement Companion. Together, Sirius and Sol guide Kathleen to Patchie's new litter, where she carefully picks out a female puppy for Miss Smith.

== Reception ==
SF writer Orson Scott Card, reviewing several DWJ reissues in The Magazine of Fantasy & Science Fiction, wrote:

Yet even with a dog hero, Jones does not overload us with cute animals. Instead they are dangerous and, by and large, rather stupid. Of course, so are the humans, so the struggle between human and animal isn't entirely one-sided. Dogsbody has become, deservedly, a classic, not despite but because of its completely nontraditional cosmology.

Kirkus Reviews wrote that "Jones sees clearly and writes effectively and the girl-and-dog story is a sure, and never sticky, heart-tugger. But the cosmic trappings are merely ridiculous". Publishers Weekly found it "among the most rewarding novels available for readers of all ages".
