= The Peasant and the Devil =

German fairy tale

Folk tale
- Name: The Peasant and the Devil
- Aarne–Thompson grouping: ATU 1030
- Country: Germany
- Published in: Grimms' Fairy Tales

"The Peasant and the Devil" (German: Der Bauer und der Teufel) is a German fairy tale collected by the Brothers Grimm, tale number 189. It is Aarne-Thompson type 1030, man and ogre share the harvest.

== Synopsis ==
A peasant found a devil in his fields, sitting on a fire. He guessed he was sitting on treasure, and the devil offered it if for two years, half of the crop was his. The peasant agreed, and said that to prevent disputes, the half above the ground was the devil's, and the half below the peasant's. When the devil agreed, the peasant planted turnips.

When harvest time came, the devil saw his leaves and the peasant's turnips, and said they must do it the other way round the next year. The peasant agreed and planted wheat. At harvest, the devil found he got nothing but stubble. Having been outwitted twice, he retreated into the earth in a fury, and the peasant took the treasure.

== Literary Criticism ==
Vladimir Propp discussed this tale as an example of the difficulties of distinguishing between animal tales and tales of the fantastic: namely, in the variants where the peasant made a deal with a bear, it was considered an animal tale.

== Bibliography ==
- Fantasy Stories (1994), compiled by Diana Wynne Jones, written by The Brothers Grimm (Wilhelm Grimm and Jacob Grimm), Jane Yolen, Tove Jansson, Andre Norton, Norton Juster, Joan Aiken, C. S. Lewis, Katharine Mary Briggs, Isaac Asimov, John Masefield, L. Frank Baum, Rudyard Kipling, Eva Ibbotson, Elizabeth Goudge, E. Nesbit, Patricia C. Wrede, Andrew Lang, and Diana Wynne Jones, illustrated by Wayne Anderson and Robin Lawrie, published by Kingfisher Books
