= Dark Lord of Derkholm =

1998 fantasy novel by Diana Wynne Jones

The Dark Lord of Derkholm
- Joseph Smith cover illustration of U.S. editions
- Author: Diana Wynne Jones
- Cover artist: Paul Campion (UK) (Note: The Internet Speculative Fiction Database (ISFDB) shows this book published one month later in the U.K. (November) than in the U.S. (October). The infobox provides data from ISFDB for both first editions but cannot display the second OCLC number (OCLC 38042800, US).: First UK edition at ISFDB.; First US edition at ISFDB.); Joseph A. Smith (US)
- Language: English
- Series: Derkholm
- Genre: Fantasy novel, parody
- Publisher: Gollancz (UK); William Morrow (US)
- Publication date: November 1998; October 1998
- Publication place: United Kingdom; United States
- Media type: Print (hardcover)
- Pages: 328 pp (UK); 345 pp (US)
- ISBN: 978-0-575-06676-2
- OCLC: 40338539
- LC Class: PZ7.J684 Dar 1998
- Followed by: Year of the Griffin

The Dark Lord of Derkholm, simply Dark Lord of Derkholm in the United States, is a fantasy novel by the British author Diana Wynne Jones, published autumn 1998 in both the U.K. and the U.S. It won the 1999 Mythopoeic Fantasy Award for Children's Literature.

The novel is a parody, for its setting is a mock high fantasy world, similar to that Jones covered in The Tough Guide to Fantasyland (U.K., 1996), a humorous travel guide on the Rough Guides model. The story continues in Year of the Griffin, and the two novels have been called the Derkholm series (which the Internet Speculative Fiction Database (ISFB) does not explicitly link to The Tough Guide). (Note: Derkholm series listing at the Internet Speculative Fiction Database (ISFDB). Retrieved 2012-05-03.)

== Plot introduction ==
The narrative is set in a fantasy world whose economy and society are controlled by an interdimensional tourism industry. An organization called "Mr. Chesney's Pilgrim Parties" coordinates annual tours for visitors from the real world to participate in various fantasy tropes, including interactions with wizard guides, attacks by winged predators, and confrontations with designated "Dark Lords". These events cause widespread environmental damage and casualties among the local population.

The head of Wizards University, Querida, determines a way to end the tours. The apparently incompetent wizard Derk will be the next Dark Lord, and his son Blade the Wizard Guide for the final tour. Querida overcomes objections all around and the plan is underway.

The Wizard Derk has seven children with his wife the Enchantress Mara: Shona and Blade, the former being the older; Kit (black with gold eyes), the oldest griffin and a magic-user; Callette (brown with green-grey wings), who makes all 126 of the Dark Lord's "gizmos" with Mr. Chesney's world's technology; Don (gold), who is a rather forgotten griffin who doesn't really do much special; Lydda (gold), who is a great cook (her food is called "godlike snacks" by the rest of the family) and long-distance flier who plants the Dark Lord's "clues" that lead to his lair; and Elda (also gold), the youngest, with the most cat cells, and who is discovered to be a strong magic user as well.

== Plot ==
In a meeting about the Pilgrim Parties, High Chancellor Querida takes a wizard, a high priest and a thief to see the Oracles, who determine that the next person the group sees will play the role of the Dark Lord, and the second person will be the Wizard Guide that they need. They meet Wizard Derk, who has taken his son Blade to see the Oracles, who say that he will be coached by Deucalion.

Derk undertakes to "evil-fy" his home, Derkholm, for its role as the Dark Lord's capital. He summons a demon to bind there, but it escapes. An ancient dragon mistakes him for a ruling Dark Lord, takes offense when it learns the commercial truth, and burns Derk so badly that he cannot play Dark Lord or help with other arrangements. His children take over.

The eldest griffin and most commanding personality among several human and griffin children, Kit takes the lead. With the dragon's help, they manage to settle the Dark Lord's soldiers (Violent and drugged criminals whom Mr. Chesney contracts to get rid of) in permanent camp. Meanwhile, Derk is convalescing back at Derkholm/The Dark Citadel but his wife, Mara, seems to be on the brink of leaving him, enjoying too much playing the part of the Glamorous Enchantress.

Blade and Shona, Derk's human son and daughter, take charge of the Pilgrim Party that Blade was assigned to as the wizard guide. Among other things, they must deal with their own attractions to tourists, and with unwanted affections, and with tourists helplessly in love with each other. The party gets lost in the wastelands, Blade and two tourists get separated from the group, and Shona leads the rest toward Derkholm.

Blade's trio discovers a mining and export operation run by Mr. Chesney. The magical properties inherent in plain fantasy earth make it a valuable power source in Chesney's world. Blade is captured by guards and sent off to fight as a gladiator, where he meets in the arena his griffin brother, Kit, captured in battle.

Back at Derkholm, father Derk is badly depressed by the apparent death of Kit, and does not carry out any of the Dark Lord's duties, nor eat, sleep, or wash. Pilgrims are camped in the valley, having been barred from the Dark Citadel by Derk, and many denizens of fantasyland (Dragons, Elves and Dwarves) have gathered in the Dark Citadel or its vicinity, by the time Mr. Chesney arrives to assess the situation and determines to levy fines. Deucalion, the dragon, helps the demon in Mr. Chesney's pocket escape and return to its mate, the one that Wizard Derk summoned. The gods, which Mr. Chesney had demanded to appear, show up and shrinks him, and leaves with him.

The arrival of the Final Pilgrim Party precipitates a showdown and the successful consummation of Querida's plan. Her retirement from the university sets the stage for a sequel, Year of the Griffin, when Derk's youngest daughter goes for training in magic.

== Main characters ==
- Wizard Derk is a wizard specialising in genetics, especially the creation of new animals. He is considered by others to be an incompetent bungler, but really is just a different sort of magic user from everyone else. He is selected as this year's Dark Lord.
- Mara is Derk's wife and is this year's chosen Glamorous Enchantress.
- Mr Chesney is an off-worlder who runs the Pilgrim Parties. Cruel and unrepentant, he doesn't really think that Blade's world is real, and therefore has no hesitation in exploiting everyone in it.
- Querida is one of the most powerful wizards in the world and runs the University of Magic. She is rather amoral, causing Mara to leave and not understanding why Derk is devastated when he believes Kit and Blade to be dead.

Derk and Mara have five griffin children and two human children:

- Shona is Derk's human daughter and eldest child. She aspires to be a bard, and is devastated when the Bardic College expels her for taking part in the Pilgrim Parties. She is attractive, musically talented, and very bossy.
- Kit is Derk's elder griffin son and is distinctive for his large size and black colouring. He is aggressive and forthright most of the time and enjoys the battles and the Wild Hunt, but is brought under control partly by his father and partly by Deucalion, who is the only person he knows who is bigger than him.
- Blade is Derk's human son and one of this year's Wizard Guides.
- Callette is Derk's eldest griffin daughter. She is very creative, and creates the gizmos for the Pilgrim Parties. She is a high-energy flier, and can only go for twenty miles at most without needing a break to rest and eat.
- Don is Derk's younger griffin son. He is lazy, but because of his exceptionally beautiful golden coat and attractive appearance, finds it easy to manipulate others.
- Lydda is one of Derk's griffin daughters. Her hobby is cooking, and due to this she is rather overweight. She is a long-distance flier, and able to go for a hundred miles without stopping.
- Elda is Derk's youngest child and a griffin female. Like a human child, she likes glitter and sequins, and is much smaller than the other griffins. She wants to be a wizard.

Other characters:

- Deucalion (Scales): King of the dragons and a powerful magic user, he is over 300 years old.
- Tripos: Demon king and a blue demon, his mate is held hostage by Mr. Chesney.
- Barnabas: Wizard friend of Derk, he is somewhat of a drunk, and secretly works for Mr. Chesney.
- Prince Talithan: An elf, Captain of the "Dark Elves", his brother is held hostage by Mr. Chesney.
- Anscher: A god.

== Awards ==
Jones and The Dark Lord won the 1999 Mythopoeic Fantasy Award, children's section. Thus, the Mythopoeic Society recognized it as the "fantasy ... that best exemplifies 'the spirit of the Inklings'" among "books for young readers (from Young Adults to picture books for beginning readers), in the tradition of The Hobbit or The Chronicles of Narnia". Jones previously won the Fantasy Award for The Crown of Dalemark and six of her books were finalists 1986 to 2009.

== See also ==
- Fantasy trope
