= A Tale of Time City =

1987 book by Diana Wynne Jones

- First UK edition
- Author: Diana Wynne Jones
- Cover artist: Alun Hood
- Language: English
- Genre: Science fantasy, children's literature
- Publisher: Methuen (UK); William Morrow (US)
- Publication date: 1987
- Publication place: United Kingdom
- Media type: Print
- Pages: 285
- ISBN: 0-416-02362-2

A Tale of Time City is a children's science fantasy novel first published in 1987 by British author Diana Wynne Jones.

== Premise ==
A girl named Vivian Smith, who is kidnapped while being evacuated from London during World War II and caught up in a struggle to preserve history. In this novel, Jones explains time travel with more reference to our current understanding of science than she does in many of her other works.

== Plot summary ==
It is September 1939, the start of World War II, and Vivian Smith is being evacuated. On arriving at the station, she is kidnapped by two boys, Jonathan and Sam, and taken to Time City, which exists outside of the real history. Most of the plot takes place in Time City, the purpose of which is to oversee the course of history and ensure that it stays on its "correct" path. To stop it straying from this path, the Time Police have Observers out in history, tweaking events to make sure that they go the right way.

Jonathan and Sam have kidnapped Vivian because they (incorrectly) believe that she is the "Time Lady", a legendary figure in Time City. The Time Lady is the consort of Faber John, another legendary figure. The legend states that at the end of history, Faber John and the Time Lady will return to Time City. Sam and Jonathan overheard the Chronologue, powerful authorities in Time City, talking about history going wrong and it being the fault of the Time Lady. They reasoned that, since she is Faber John's (in translation, John Smith's) wife, she must be calling herself Smith, and disguised as a young girl. Since Vivian fits these criteria, they had reasoned that she must be the Time Lady.

Vivian manages to convince them that she is not the Time Lady, but the boys cannot return her to her own time, since the repeated use of the time-locks would be picked up on by the Time Police and they would be found out. Vivian ends up staying with Jonathan's family, disguised as his cousin Vivian Lee.

Jonathan and Sam are especially concerned about the disruptions in history because it may mean that Time City will also break apart. They soon learn from Vivian's tutor, Doctor Wilander, that there is another legend about Faber John. This one states that Faber John created four Caskets – Gold, Silver, Iron and Lead – which, after being placed out in history, provide the power needed to keep Time City running. They discover that the Caskets are hidden in what are known as the Unstable Eras – eras of history in which events are not fixed and which might change at any moment. There are only three large Unstable Eras, however, so the fourth Casket must be hidden somewhere else.

Undeterred, Jonathan, Vivian, Sam and the android Elio go in search of the Caskets, using an ancient time-travel device they find in a secret room beneath a museum. They discover that the Iron Casket, which was hidden in Vivian's time, had already been stolen, and it was this that was causing the disturbances in history. They see the so-called "Iron Guardian" as a ghost, in Time City, and talk to him. They realise that they will have to go back in time to stop the theft, and actually see the casket being stolen, but they are unable to catch the thief.

They fare no better with the Gold Casket; they find it, and its Guardian, but the Guardian refuses to hand it over, saying that at midday on the final day of Time City, he will come to the Gnomon Tower and return it. Although they try to convince him that they urgently need it, he refuses to hand it over, and promptly vanishes.

The Silver Casket is hidden in the middle of the Mind Wars, but they still manage to find it, and the Silver Guardian, who, surprisingly, lets them have it. It turns out that it is a fake, and the real Silver Casket had already been stolen, probably by the woman who posed as the Silver Guardian.

On returning to Time City, they see that things have gone terribly wrong. Since the Silver Casket had gone, history has gone into convulsions, and nothing is as it was supposed to be, with World War II starting in 1937 and involving napalm and atom bombs from the start, and World War I melding into the Boer War. In a final attempt to catch the thieves, Jonathan, Vivian and Sam return to the station where they had kidnapped Vivian, and where they are sure the thief must be. This goes badly wrong when they fail to catch the thief, cause an accidental explosion of a train carrying radioactive fuel, and return to Time City with two hundred evacuees in tow.

Because of this final disturbance of history, Time City has practically shut down. The Observers are being recalled from history, and this includes the real Vivian Lee and her family. But when they arrive, Vivian, Sam and Jonathan have a nasty surprise; the real Vivian Lee is the child thief that they saw stealing the Iron Casket, her mother is the false Silver Guardian, and her father is a man that they saw in the Age of Gold who tried to kill Jonathan. As Time City starts to fall to pieces around them, the Lees force Vivian, Sam and Jonathan to go to the Gnomon Tower with them as hostages. The trio realise the ancient time-travel device they found is in fact the Lead Casket, and Sam manages to escape from the clock tower to tell Elio, who returns with the city officials. When the clock struck twelve, the Gold Watcher appears at the steps of the Tower (with the Gold Casket, of course) and begins to climb the stairs.

Hiding in a bush to prevent Vivian or Jonathan from being shot, Elio uses the Lead Casket to stop the Gold Watcher from reaching the top. This drained the Silver and Iron Caskets of "force", all of which went back into the Lead one. Dr. Wilander banishes Inga Lee, the daughter of an Icelandic emperor, to the earliest settlements of Iceland; Viv Lee to the last days of the "Depopulation of Earth". Vivan (Lee) is sent to Ancient China, but not before Dr. Wilander lets Vivian (Smith) shove the butter-pie she (VL) had been eating into her own eye, then inside her collar.

The three Guardians, who Vivian notices are all exactly the same height as Dr. Wilander, bring the Caskets together with the Lead one, which Dr. Wilander is still holding, and they all blend together. Vivian realises he is in fact Faber John. The Time Lady, who as well as a horse she found in the Age of Gold, was the sleeping figure under Aeon Square that Jonathan and Sam had shown Vivian, and also the woman who had cured Jonathan in the Age of Gold.

Vivian, Sam, and Jonathan are put on trial for breaking the law. Mr. Donegal (Sam's father and Chief of Time Patrol) explains that they had pinpointed the source of a massive amount of chronons (which cause chaos and could harm the city) to September 1939 as Vivian Smith. The plan was to extract her from history and to a Fixed Era where the load could be neutralised. Jonathan and Elio tell the rest of the story. Jonathan and Sam's trials are postponed until Chronologue gets back together again and until he is older, respectively. The Time Lady tells Vivian that she would disturb every bit of history she comes in contact with, with the amount of chronons and temporons (which anyone from history has), and her solution is to send Vivian out to the stars. A lonely Vivian realises that she is lost – home was at war, and now had nowhere to go. The Walkers, Jonathan, and Elio all jump up and vouch for Vivian, saying they could all bear to live in the Stone Age as punishment for doing so. Faber John and the Time Lady relent; Time City has endured her so far and anyway, it could always be built back up again. They arrange for her parents to be brought to Time City as well.

== Reception ==
Dave Langford reviewed A Tale of Time City for White Dwarf #98, and stated that "though the cavalry comes over the hill so effectively in the final chapter that one isn't sure the kids' efforts were entirely necessary, it's a pleasant read and often very funny".

== Reviews ==
- Review by Tom Whitmore (1987) in Locus #323, December 1987
- Review by Helen McNabb (1988) in Vector #142
- Review by Phyllis McDonald (1988) in Interzone #25, September–October 1988
- Review by Andy Sawyer (1989) in Paperback Inferno #78
- Review by Baird Searles (1989) in Isaac Asimov's Science Fiction Magazine, mid-December 1989
- Review by Orson Scott Card (1992) in The Magazine of Fantasy & Science Fiction, February 1992
