= Fantasy Fiction =

American fantasy magazine

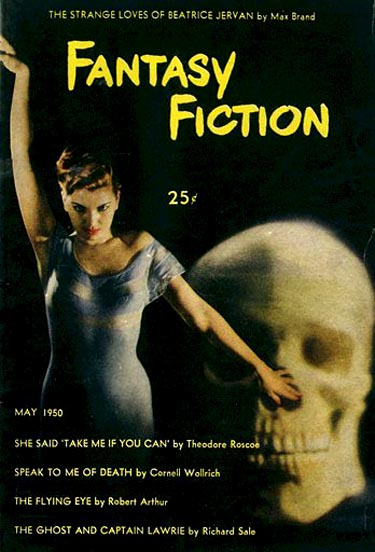
Cover of the first issue; photograph by Bill Stone

Fantasy Fiction was an American fantasy magazine that published two issues in 1950. The first issue was dated May 1950, with a planned quarterly schedule; the second was retitled Fantasy Stories and appeared in November 1950. The fiction was mixture of reprints, mostly of 1930s fiction that had originally appeared in Argosy, and new material. Science fiction historian Mike Ashley comments that while the reprints were good quality, the new stories "were obviously written in response to an editorial policy of sensationalism and are of no significance". The reprints were given lurid new titles: for example, Irvin S. Cobb's "Fishhead" was retitled "Blood-Brother of the Swamp Cats". Readers were asked to send in accounts of fantastical experiences, and to help find a haunted house. The cover of both issues was a photograph, rather an artwork; the photographer was Bill Stone, whose work had been on the cover of the first issue of The Magazine of Fantasy & Science Fiction.

== Bibliographic details ==
Fantasy Fiction was published by Magabook, Inc, a Chicago publisher with editorial offices in New York. The issues were dated May and November 1950; both were digest, 128 pages, and priced at 25 cents. The editor was Curtis Mitchell.

== Sources ==
- Ashley, Mike (1985). "Fantasy Fiction (1950)". In Tymn, Marshall B.; Ashley, Mike (eds.). Science Fiction, Fantasy and Weird Fiction Magazines. Westport, Connecticut: Greenwood Press. pp. 266–267. ISBN 0-3132-1221-X.
