= Archer's Goon =

1984 fantasy novel by Diana Wynne Jones

- First edition (UK)
- Author: Diana Wynne Jones
- Cover artist: Dave Eastbury
- Language: English
- Genre: Children's fantasy novel
- Publisher: Methuen (UK); Greenwillow Books (US)
- Publication date: 1984
- Publication place: Great Britain
- Media type: Print
- Pages: 241
- ISBN: 0-416-49260-6

Archer's Goon is a 1984 fantasy novel by Diana Wynne Jones both for the young adult and adult markets. It was nominated for the 1985 World Fantasy Award for Best Novel and is listed as an ALA Notable Children's Book, an ALA Best Book for Young Adults, and a Boston Globe–Horn Book Award Honor Book.

== Plot summary ==
Thirteen-year-old Howard Sykes lives in an English town with his parents, Quentin, an author and professor, and Catriona, a music teacher; his sister Anthea, always called "Awful" because of her constant screaming; and Fifi, the family's au pair. Their life is interrupted one afternoon when an unnamed huge person, "somebody's Goon" as Fifi describes him, comes into their home and announces that he has come to collect the two thousand words that Quentin owes somebody called Archer.

It transpires that thirteen years ago, Quentin was suffering dreadfully from writer's block and hadn't been able to write anything for nearly a year after his last book was published, and so Mountjoy, a town official, came up with the idea that Quentin should undertake to write two thousand words of nonsense quarterly and deliver them to him at the town hall. In return, Quentin was promised an exemption from city taxes. The Goon says that the latest two thousand didn't get to Archer. Quentin irritably writes a replacement set and gives them to the Goon, who goes away – but the next afternoon, he is back, as the words were a repeat of what had been done previously, and the agreement specified that they must not be a copy or paraphrase of anything Quentin had done before.

The Goon takes Howard to see Mountjoy, who reveals that the town is secretly run by seven wizard siblings: Archer, Shine, Dillian, Hathaway, Torquil, Erskine, and Venturus. Each one "farms" some aspects of the town's life and industry. Mountjoy has instructions from an unknown superior to post the words but does not know who the actual recipient is.

Mountjoy's revelation starts the Sykes family on a quest for the sibling who is the actual user of Quentin's words.

Fifi reveals to Howard that she did not deliver the two thousand words as she was busy and gave them to one of Quentin's students at the college, Maisie Potter, to deliver. Howard, Awful and Fifi go to Maisie Potter's house to find out what she did with them. She tries to fob them off with excuses as to why the words were not delivered but they finally get the truth out of her: that she gave them to one of the wizard siblings, Dillian. The trio force her to take them to see Dillian.

Dillian admits that she did ask Maisie Potter to steal the words as she believes, just like the other siblings, that the two thousand words have for the past thirteen years prevented them from leaving the town. Howard informs her that the words have been delivered to Archer for the past thirteen years and this makes Dillian believe that Archer is behind them all being stuck there. She gives back the words to Howard, but as he, Fifi and Awful are walking home they find that the words have magically vanished. When they try to go back to Dillian's house, it too has magically vanished.

The Goon takes the family to meet Archer, who also believes that Quentin's words are restricting him and his siblings from leaving town. His aim is to acquire a sample of the writing so that he can figure out how to lift the restriction, in order to take over the world. On learning of Archer's ambitions, Quentin becomes convinced that the restrictions are a thoroughly good thing, and stubbornly refuses to write them anymore.

Other siblings also want to acquire samples of Quentin's words for the same purpose as Archer and they all start putting pressure on the Sykes family. Gas and electricity are cut off, the shops are closed to them, their bank accounts are frozen, and all of Catriona's musical instruments play themselves, full blast, as do the radio and TV. Torquil, who farms music and therefore is Catriona's effective boss, threatens that she will lose her job if she does not get Quentin to write him the two thousand words; Fifi, who has fallen in love with Archer, attempts to get the words for him; Shine sends a group of boys known as Hind's Gang, led by one Ginger Hind, to follow Howard and Awful and briefly kidnaps the two to use them as leverage, though the Goon and Torquil quickly come to the rescue. Hathaway (roads and transport, archives and records) sends a messenger to collect the words, but Quentin locks up his typewriter with a length of chain and a padlock and gives it to the messenger, telling him to have Hathaway write the words himself; the street outside the Sykes' house is subsequently dug up and re-paved over and over again as a form of punishment.

When Quentin receives a letter from the town demanding payment of a huge amount in back taxes, Howard and Awful decide that they have to seek help from Hathaway who, they discover, lives 400 years in the past. The children visit Hathaway in his Elizabethan household by going through a white door marked CURATOR at the back of the museum. Hathaway proves to be very reasonable, stops the street digging, and promises to help about the taxes. Howard suggests that Hathaway could bury some money at the site where their garden will be, so he (Howard) can dig it up tomorrow. Hathaway, however, points out that this wouldn't work; he (Hathaway) can't stop someone else from finding the money during the 400 years in between. He also tells Howard that Catriona and Quentin found him (Howard) as an infant and adopted him, which proves only to add more to the boy's troubles.

With Hathaway out of the running, Erskine is the next most likely candidate as the "user of the words". The Goon takes Quentin and the two children through the sewers to Erskine's sewage installation outside the city limits. It would have been only a short walk above ground, and when asked why he took them through the sewers, the Goon admits that he can only leave the town through the sewer or by a rubbish truck. Quentin realizes the Goon is, in fact, Erskine.

Erskine has the three locked up as a way of exerting even more pressure on Quentin, but they manage to escape with the help of the aforementioned Ginger Hind, who insists that he needs Howard's help to be free from Shine. Howard now must find the seventh brother, Venturus, who lives in the future. Howard identifies Venturus's hiding place by going to a half-constructed building, i.e. a place that will exist in the future. As he runs from Erskine's men, he frantically wishes to Hathaway to send him a bus, and lo and behold – one appears. He asks Archer for money for the fare, Shine to cause a distraction, and Dillian for a police car to stop Shine's "distraction", which goes a little over the top; all of these things miraculously appear. Having asked Catriona where she would live if she lived in the future and told "some house that hasn't been built yet", Howard acts on this suggestion and makes for what he guesses is Venturus's hideout – a half-finished building near the Polytechnic where Quentin works (bearing in mind that as well as housing, Venturus also farms education).

Howard's guess is correct, and as he climbs up the stairs of the unfinished building, he discovers that each step ages him and the building completes itself around him as he moves forward in time. On a mirror is scrawled the foreboding message, "THIS IS THE SECOND TIME". Howard eventually realizes that he himself is Venturus, who has been building a fantastic spaceship inside his home in the future. Venturus had twice, to get himself out of design problems with his spaceship, sent the whole town back thirteen years through time, accidentally transforming himself into a small child in the process. That small child was adopted (twice) by Quentin and Catriona, who named him Howard. The six siblings could not leave the town all that time not because of Quentin's words, but because their parents laid it on them to protect Venturus, and as long as Venturus–Howard was too young to realize his magical powers, they had to be close by to protect him.

Torquil, Hathaway, Erskine, and Venturus, who understand that civilization would likely crumble if one of the seven gained ultimate control, evolve a plan to send the other three, eldest siblings (Archer, Shine, and Dillian) off into deep space, never to return, in Venturus's newly constructed spaceship. They do this by convincing each of the three that the rest had plotted against each other and would put their final plan into action that night in Venturus's spaceship. They all board the ship, which Howard–Venturus has programmed to allow them to come aboard but not disembark, for a one-way trip to Alpha Centauri, and the ship takes off. The remaining siblings have no plans to rule the world, but Howard, now Venturus, still worries about what Erskine and Awful may get up to in the future. He decides he will stay with the Sykes family so he can help keep Awful in check and Erskine decides to travel the world, making for a pleasant ending.

== The siblings and their domains ==
- Archer: Money; power (i.e. electricity and gas)
- Shine: Crime; industry (though she is not interested in the latter)
- Dillian: Law and order; fire brigade (shared with Erskine)
- Hathaway: Roads and transport; records and archives
- Torquil: Music; sport; shops; religion (never stated, but clear from context)
- Erskine: Water and drains; fire brigade (shared with Dillian); rubbish (never stated, but clear from context)
- Venturus: Housing; education

All seven farm the taxes.

== Reception ==
Dave Langford reviewed Archer's Goon for White Dwarf #63, and stated that "after this, things get complicated. Though one dodgy moral question goes unanswered, the ending is splendidly silly; Jones has written better books, but her inventiveness is a reminder that there's life in fantasy if you know where to look".

Lynn Bryant reviewed Archer's Goon in Space Gamer/Fantasy Gamer No. 79 and called it a "well written and original, a gripping read".

Weird Tales reviewer John Gregory Betancourt praised the novel as "a witty little urban fantasy [and] a delight to read".

Writer Neil Gaiman has said that the novel is probably his "favourite children's book [he has] read as an adult".

== Television adaptation ==
In 1992, the book was adapted as a six-part TV series by the BBC. Of the experience, Diana Wynne Jones said:

I was quite closely involved, actually, because the producer (Richard Callanan) was a very nice man and he wanted to get it as close to the book as possible. Both of us had to sit around the table and persuade the scriptwriter (Jenny McDade) to make it close to the book. When she started it couldn't have been further from the book. It got closer and closer and closer and they got most of it in. They couldn't get some of the stuff at the end in but they did a fairly good job – I think the scriptwriter actually didn't enjoy herself at all. They asked me whether I'd like to write scripts but, so far, I haven't found it appeals. It's a very different way of thinking, of telling a story. I was talking to somebody who is, primarily, a scriptwriter but who'd also published his scripts as novels and he says he has to write the script first and then the novel from the script. I would have to do it the other way around, I think.
