= The Merlin Conspiracy =

2003 novel by Diana Wynne Jones

- First UK edition
- Author: Diana Wynne Jones
- Series: Magids
- Genre: Fantasy
- Publisher: HarperCollins (Collins, UK; Greenwillow Books, US)
- Publication date: April 2003
- Publication place: United Kingdom, United States
- Media type: Print (hardcover, trade paper)
- Pages: 473, 468 (UK, US first eds.)
- ISBN: 0-00-715141-1 (UK hard)
- OCLC: 52056226
- LC Class: PZ7.J684 Me 2003
- Preceded by: Deep Secret

The Merlin Conspiracy is a children's fantasy novel by Diana Wynne Jones, published by HarperCollins in April 2003, simultaneously in Britain and America. It is a sequel to Deep Secret (1997).

In the 2004 poll of Locus readers to confer the annual Locus Awards, it finished third among the year's young-adult books (fantasy, horror, and science fiction, etc.).

== Plot ==
In a parallel universe, Roddy (a.k.a. Arianrhod), daughter of two magicians who serve the King of Blest, has traveled with "the King's Progress" her entire life. The King's Progress is a mobile Court that continuously roams the Islands of Blest (our England) to contain and control the natural magic in the world. Roddy and her best friend, Grundo, uncover a sinister plot involving Grundo's mother and the new "Merlin" – the magical governor of Blest – to take over the throne and the magic of the universe. When Roddy and Grundo try to warn the adults around them of the plot, they are not believed, and Roddy ends up making a spell to ask help of someone from another world, but the only person she manages to find is Nick.

Nick Mallory (a.k.a. Nichothodes Koryfoides) is a boy living in our own England who dreams about becoming a magid and travelling to other worlds. A magid is a sort of magical policeman who travels between worlds and helps people. Nick finds himself accidentally wandering the dark paths between the worlds, where he finds Roddy and then the powerful magician Romanov. Nick finally makes his way to Blest when he finds Maxwell Hyde, Roddy's grandfather, who is a magid, but Grundo's mother and the fake Merlin have been kidnapping all the most powerful witches and wizards in Blest – including Maxwell Hyde and both of Roddy's parents – and it is up to Nick, Roddy and Grundo to raise the land and stop the plot.

== Characters ==
The main characters, Arianrhod Hyde, or Roddy, and Nichothodes Euthandor Timosus Benigedy Koryfoides, or Nick Mallory, come from alternate worlds (The World of Blest and Earth respectively) and the book is written from their point of view (each one writing alternate chapters). The Merlin Conspiracy is set in the same multiverse as the 1997 Jones novel Deep Secret, although the only characters in common are Nick and his father Ted Mallory.

Ambrose, or Grundo, is the miserable, "backwards" son of Sybil, the evil enchantress. He grew up being best friends with Roddy since he was three, together he and Roddy discover the Merlin conspiracy and then spend some time separated from the king's progress.

Toby is Arianrhod's cousin from her aunt Dora.

Ilsabil and Isadora are two twin sisters whose mother is Roddy's aunt, their mother and grandmother are hereditary witches.

Maxwell Hyde is a magid who travels between worlds. He lives in Blest London with Dora (Maxwell's daughter) and Toby (Dora's son). He is Roddy's grandfather on her father's side.

Gwyn ap Nud is Roddy's grandfather on her mother's side, and is also a magical being.

Romanov is an extremely powerful magic user. He can work outside the rules that magids have in place.

== Reception ==
The New York Times gave cautious praise to this novel, saying it "blends some New Age spirituality with the grand old Stonehenge/White Horse/Arthurian/Britain-as-Magicland material into a strong concoction", but felt that the characters could be more vivid and the mythology more inventive. The header of its review includes the note "(Ages 10 and up)", evidently provided by the publisher or the US imprint Greenwillow Books.
