= Eight Days of Luke =

Book by Diana Wynne Jones

- First edition
- Author: Diana Wynne Jones
- Cover artist: Peter Whiteman
- Language: English
- Genre: Fantasy, children's literature
- Publisher: Macmillan
- Publication date: 1975
- Publication place: Great Britain
- Media type: Print
- Pages: 165 pp.
- ISBN: 0-333-17141-1
- OCLC: 16298088

Eight Days of Luke is a children's fantasy novel written by Diana Wynne Jones published in 1975. It tells the tale of a neglected English boy who encounters what prove to be figures from Norse mythology.

== Plot ==
=== Sunday ===
David Allard, an orphan, returns to his hometown of Ashbury from boarding school to discover that his relatives-cum-guardians have nothing arranged for his summer and he will have to endure their mistreatment for his entire holiday.

While walking in the garden, in a fit of frustration he makes up words to use as a curse. David's words seem to cause the garden wall to crumble, and to release a boy a year or so older than himself with flame-red hair, who identifies himself as Luke. Happy to have made a new friend, David notices Luke's odd references to being released from his "chains" and "bowls of venom". The two hastily repair the wall, and David notices that Luke's touch seems to burn the bushes growing beside the wall. Luke says ruefully that he "can't bring the dead back to life". Luke also tells David that simply kindling a flame will summon him.

=== Monday ===
When David and his young cousin-by-marriage, Astrid (who seems the best of the awful relatives) are on a shopping expedition the next day, Luke duly appears when David lights a match. Luke ingratiates himself with Astrid, and when a bored David suggests it would be great if the building across from them caught on fire, the building suddenly does. People are trapped. It is only when David tells Luke that he wants the fire out, and reminds Luke that he cannot bring the dead back to life, that the fire dies down.

That evening, David escapes punishment because his uncle is upset that his gardener has found another job over at Thunderly Hill. David notices more odd things about Luke; he can entertain his friend with fiery doodles. Also, when Luke is asleep, he seems ageless, and heals uncommonly quickly.

=== Tuesday ===
In the morning, the new gardener Mr. Chew arrives. He is very interested in David, and in the place where Luke's release took place. Luke, who has slept over, seems afraid of Chew, castigating himself for his carelessness in scorching the plants. David helps Luke escape the house without Chew noticing, and they play cricket (David's obsession) down the street, where they meet a new friend, Alan. David is unable to escape the house in the afternoon, due to Chew's vigilance. David is sent again to his room without supper, though Astrid secretly brings him food.

=== Wednesday ===
The next morning, a well-dressed man named Mr. Wedding arrives and persuades David's relations to let him take David out for lunch in a car chauffeured by a beautiful lady. He quickly gains David's trust, and David gladly tells him all the things about school he could not tell his relatives. They arrive at a green island, linked to the mainland by a long arching bridge with a rainbow-like effect. While David is served a wonderful lunch, Mr. Wedding begins interrogating David about Luke, and David admits only to releasing Luke while trying to curse. David notices for the first time that Wedding is missing an eye.

Wedding tells David that Luke was imprisoned for doing something terrible. He tries frightening David, threatening to keep him captive, promising him a bribe, even shaming him. None of this is successful – David will not betray Luke – and eventually Mr. Wedding returns David home, seeming to admire David for his stubbornness. Then he makes a deal with David: if David can keep Luke free until Sunday, then Luke is safe for good.

Mr. Wedding sets a talking raven to watch David, but he is able to evade the bird and summon Luke. He tells Luke about the deal, who is confident that they will win against Mr. Wedding.

=== Thursday ===
The next day, David is blocked from leaving the house by two ravens, until he distracts them with a joint of meat while he drives off with Astrid. Luke appears when David strikes a match for Astrid's cigarette, and is suddenly caught by a fair, strong ginger-haired individual. After Luke is questioned by the fellow, he is released. It seems the individual, who seems very nice, has lost something. Luke denies any knowledge. David and Luke agree that the best course is for Luke to simply vanish until Monday.

=== Friday ===
The next day, the Frys from down the street show up, followed shortly by Mr. Chew and Mr Wedding. When a confused Astrid needs a cigarette lit, the inevitable happens – Luke appears and is caught by the group. They begin shouting demands at Luke; Luke denies everything, and David defends him, saying Luke did not act out of revenge, but as a favour for someone now dead. Luke admits that he did help someone hide something so it might never be found. The crowd is grudgingly convinced that this is true, and Mr. Wedding strikes a new deal with David: since David has no idea what he is looking for, it is possible for him to find it (according to the rules of the charm Luke laid down). If David restores what the ginger-haired fellow lost by Sunday, Luke will remain free, otherwise he will be sent back to prison.

Astrid has figured out the puzzle, but Luke warns her not to tell David. David convinces one of the ravens to lead them to a house on Wednesday Hill, where David should find "three Knowing Ones under the tree". It is Alan's house, and through a secret door, David and Alan find a huge tree, with three blind crones, sharing an eye among them, washing, spinning, and cutting wool at a well. They refuse to talk until David captures their eye, then they tell David to go to the place (Wallsey) where Mr. Wedding took him and ask the man with the dragon where to look.

=== Saturday through Sunday ===
The next day, Astrid drives David, Alan, and her husband, Cousin Ronald, to Wallsey, which appears very different from when David saw it with Mr. Wedding. David searches the hall, which is filled with strong young men cheating pinball machines, until he finds what he was told to look for: a man with a dragon tattoo.

By the rules, the three must run a gauntlet before having their questions answered, which the boys do courageously and Ronald does in a cowardly fashion. The dragon man admits to taking the item they sought as revenge, on behalf of a woman who blamed Mr. Wedding for something that happened. The woman can be found on Thunderly Hill, where a hospital is now built.

David, Luke, Astrid, Ronald, and the ginger-haired fellow all proceed to Thunderly Hill, on the excuse that Ronald's minor injuries should be treated. When David and Luke step inside "Firestone Ward", they find themselves on a grassy hillside that burns but is never consumed. Luke admits that he set the fire, long ago, and it will burn until the end of time. David braves the flames (with Luke doing his best to suppress the fire) and discovers a cairn, on which a hauntingly beautiful lady in armour lies, not quite dead, but barely breathing. Across her chest rests a stone implement with a too-short handle. When David realises it is a hammer, suddenly everything falls into place and he realises who everyone really is. He returns to Luke, and is told that an entire day has passed – David has been outside time. He restores the hammer to the ginger-haired fellow, who is revealed to be Thor. Mr. Wedding is Woden, chief of the gods, the dragon man is Siegfried, while the lady is Brunhilda.

Astrid reveals that (no doubt with divine interference) David's other relatives have been exposed as financial frauds, and have fled. Astrid will now be David's guardian. Luke will be around, but at the final battle yet to come, he and Mr. Wedding will be on opposite sides.

== Allusions ==
An afterword gives a full explanation of the Norse references on which the story is based. Luke is Loki, the Norse god of luck and fire. The other gods show up on the day they give their names to in the week:

- Tuesday – one-armed war god Tiu in the guise of the gruff gardener Mr. Chew.
- Wednesday – Odin, chief of the gods, appearing as well-dressed Mr. Wedding.
- Thursday – Thor, Norse god of thunder.
- Friday – fertility gods Freyja and Freyr disguised as the boisterous Mr. and Mrs. Fry.

David encountered the Norns under the great tree Yggdrasil, and travelled to Valhalla (afterlife for heroes on Wallsey island) with Woden and one of his Valkyries.

== Reception and reviews ==
Science fiction author Orson Scott Card, reviewing several Diana Wynne Jones reissues in The Magazine of Fantasy & Science Fiction, wrote:

Eight Days of Luke takes us into the world of the Nordic gods, as both sides in the intensely amoral struggle prepare for Götterdämmerung. Yet she manages to connect their quarrels and manoeuvres with contemporary life, including giving Thor a leather-jacket gang in a pinball arcade and putting one-eyed Wutan in a business suit. And our hero's passage from "real" to fantasy world and back again is as smooth as in the best of contemporary fantasists – Charles de Lint, for instance, or Megan Lindholm, or Lisa Goldstein. Yet Eight Days of Luke bears a 1975 copyright, predating these others by years. (Indeed, I wonder how many of our contemporary fantasists might not have been exposed to Jones in their youth. How strong is her influence? Or is she simply weaving her own thread into the fabric of contemporary myth?)

Publishers Weekly called the title "a smooth blend of myth and reality".

Fantasy writer Neil Gaiman stated that his 2000 novel American Gods was not inspired by Eight Days of Luke, but he considered his and her book as a "cousins". After coming up with an initial idea for a story linking Norse gods and the days of the week, he realised that Diana already used this story in her book and Gaiman abandoned this approach.

== See also ==
- Norse mythology
- Huginn and Muninn
