= Enchanted Glass =

2010 novel by Diana Wynne Jones

- First edition (UK)
- Author: Diana Wynne Jones
- Cover artist: David Wyatt
- Language: English
- Genre: Children's, fantasy novel
- Publisher: HarperCollins
- Publication date: 2010
- Publication place: United Kingdom
- Media type: Print (hardback)
- Pages: 292
- ISBN: 0-00-732078-7 (hardback)

Enchanted Glass is a fantasy novel by Diana Wynne Jones which was first published in 2010.

== Plot ==
Enchanted Glass is set in the fictional town of Melstone, England. Near the town of Melstone is Melstone House, an old place which Andrew Hope has inherited from his grandfather. With Melstone House comes a "field-of-care" which is a region of magical responsibility, but Andrew does not quite grasp the full implications of this, causing many of the problems in the story.

Shortly after Andrew takes possession of Melstone House, Aidan Cain appears on his doorstep, asking for help. His recently deceased grandmother had told him that the owner of Melstone House could help him, if he ever needed it. Aidan is being pursued by an unknown force, which turns out to be the fairy king Oberon, who thinks he is his son.

Together, Andrew and Aidan must unravel the mystery of Melstone House, and gain control of their magic.

== Characters ==
=== Andrew Brandon Hope ===
Andrew is one of the protagonists of the book. He has a Doctorate, but is known by many as "Professor", and tends to be quite oblivious.

When he was a child, Andrew's grandfather taught him quite a bit of magic, but as he grew up, he forgot much of it. Despite his forgetfulness, Andrew is very talented at magic.

=== Aidan Cain ===
Aidan is the other protagonist of the novel. He is an adolescent with a very strong magical talent. He does not know who his father is, and his mother is dead. He was raised by his grandmother, who recently died, leaving him to foster care.

=== Groil ===
Groil is a giant adolescent who matures at slower rates than humans. He is still a youngster while Andrew has already become the head of Melton House. Aidan Cain takes pity on for wearing the clothes that Andrew gave Groil while Andrew himself was still a child. Groil becomes a very valuable ally to Aidan.

=== Rolf ===
Rolf is a weredog that follows Aidan home from Oberon's forest.

=== Jocelyn Brandon ===
A powerful wizard and grandfather of Andrew Hope.

=== Oberon/Mr. Brown ===
Fairy king living as a human, he was the "supposed" father of Aidan but is not.

=== Tarquin O'Connor ===
He used to be a horse jockey until he lost one of his legs.

=== Stashe ===
Daughter of Tarquin and Andrew's wife.

=== Mrs Stock ===
Melstone House's housekeeper

=== Trixie Appleby ===
Mrs. Stock's sister

=== Mr Stock ===
Melstone House's gardener

=== Shaun ===
He is hired to work for Andrew and he is Groil's counterpart.
