= Isobel Armstrong =

British academic (born 1937)

Isobel Armstrong, FBA (born 1937) is a British academic. She is professor emerita of English at Birkbeck, University of London and a senior research fellow of the Institute of English Studies at the University of London. She is a fellow of the British Academy. She has been a visiting scholar at many institutions, including at Princeton University in 2016-2017. She is a poet. Armstrong is the younger sister of writer Diana Wynne Jones.

== Career ==
Armstrong is a critic of nineteenth-century poetry, literature and women's writing. Her publications include Novel Politics: Democratic Imaginations in Nineteenth-Century Fiction (2017), The Radical Aesthetic (2000), Women's Poetry, Late Romantic to Late Victorian: Gender and Genre (1999) and Victorian Poetry: Poetry, Politics and Poetics (1993). Her book Victorian Glassworlds: Glass Culture and the Imagination (2008) won the Modern Language Association's James Russell Lowell Prize.

In Victorian Poetry: Poetry, Politics and Poetics, Armstrong contends that poems by women can speak double, using conventionally feminine modes as a “way of looking at conformity from within.” Armstrong uses Adelaide Procter as an exemplar, naming her as someone who “typifies the woman poet's interests at the time.” In her poetry in the English Woman’s Journal as well as in Charles Dickens’ magazine Household Words, Procter deploys “often simple, often pious, often conventional” modes of address. However, “those conventions are subjected to investigation, questioned, or used for unexpected purposes.”

Possession: A Romance, the 1990 Booker Prize-winning novel by A. S. Byatt, was dedicated to Armstrong.

== Publications ==
- George Eliot, Spinoza and the Emotions, chapter in A Companion to George Eliot, ed. Amanda Anderson, Harry E. Shaw, Oxford: Wiley-Blackwell, 2013
- Steve Connor's Lightness of Being, Critical Quarterly, 56, July 2014
