= Hecate's Cauldron =

Hecate's Cauldron is a 1982 anthology novel written by Susan Shwartz.

== Plot summary ==
Hecate's Cauldron is a novel in which thirteen stories focus on witches and magic. Tales range from an inept juggler encountering Baba Yaga, to a girl making a pact with the devil, to a twist on Persephone's legend, and even a witch saving a fusion power plant. Several stories explore the triple goddess concept and historical conflicts between paganism and Christianity. Highlights include Charles Saunders' "Ishigbi", where an African witch battles her twin brother, a healer, and Jessica Amanda Salmonson's "The Harmonious Battle", in which a one-armed warrior must confront a demon and herself in a mystical realm.

== Reception ==
David R. Dunham reviewed Hecate's Cauldron for Different Worlds magazine and stated that "Whether you read it for the sake of the stories, or to get literary flavor and ideas for your campaign, Hecate's Cauldron will be worth your time."

== Reviews ==
- Review by Phyllis J. Day (1982) in Science Fiction & Fantasy Book Review, #5, June 1982
- Review by Patricia Shaw Mathews [as by Patricia Shaw] (1982) in Science Fiction Review, Fall 1982
