= The Tough Guide to Fantasyland =

Nonfiction book by Diana Wynne Jones

The Tough Guide To Fantasyland
- First edition (UK)
- Author: Diana Wynne Jones
- Cover artist: Steve Crisp (first); Tony Sahara (rev.)
- Language: English
- Subject: Fantasy literature, adult fiction, parody
- Genre: Dictionary
- Publisher: Vista Books; Firebird Books (rev.)
- Publication date: 1996; 2006 (rev.)
- Publication place: United Kingdom; United States (revised)
- Media type: Print (paperback)
- Pages: 223 pp 234 pp (rev.)
- ISBN: 978-0-575-60106-2
- OCLC: 34674975
- Dewey Decimal: 828/.91407
- LC Class: PR6060.O497 Z468 1996 (same) 2006
- Followed by: Dark Lord of Derkholm

The Tough Guide to Fantasyland is a non-fiction book by the British author Diana Wynne Jones that humorously examines the common tropes of a broad swathe of fantasy fiction. The U.S. Library of Congress calls it a dictionary, (Note: Its dictionary subject subheadings are Children's stories, English and Fantasy fiction, English. (LC catalogue entry)) but it may be called a fictional or parodic tourist guidebook. It was first published by Vista Books (London) in 1996. A revised and updated edition was completed in 2006 and published by Penguin (Firebird Books), first in the U.S. (Note: Hereafter "revised" denotes the revised and expanded U.S. edition (trade paper 2006, hardcover 2007). "Second" edition must be avoided. • Editorial discussion at ISFDB reveals that the first US edition (DAW Books, 1998, 0-88677-832-8) includes material that compilers have not compared with any of the earlier British editions: at least a map copyright 1998 and uncredited interior illustrations in a different style.)

Jones has written many fantasy novels, mainly for children or young adults, including some that simply rely upon and some that subvert common fantasy motifs. Dark Lord of Derkholm (1998) is one that subverts, and a conceptual sequel. It is set in a fantasy world that maintains the cliches detailed in the Tough Guide for the benefit of commercial tourism from the real world.

== Origin ==
The inside back cover of the revised edition is a 2006 postscript by Jones, "How I Came to Write This Guidebook". While hospitalized in 1994, she and Chris Bell worked on projected entries for The Encyclopedia of Fantasy (Clute & Grant, Orbit Books, 1997): "Our job was to decide whether each entry was necessary, to suggest new ones, to discuss whether some of the entries made sense (many didn't), and to provide examples in support of what each entry said".

== Description ==
Unusually, the book presents itself as a tourist guidebook; its title alludes to the Rough Guides series of such guidebooks. Its conceit is that the fantasy worlds depicted in many fantasy novels, games, and films are identical, although tours visit different places such as provinces of Finland. In an extended metaphor, the readers (or viewers or players) are tourists; authors are tour guides, and their stories are sight-seeing tours or package holidays to this Fantasyland. (Note: Front endpapers of the revised edition begin with "A Guide to The Tough Guide", which opens: "Imagine that every single fantasy novel featuring kings, dragons, quests, and magic takes place in the same country. That country is called Fantasyland. [paragraph break] Part 'travel guide' for the hapless 'fantasy tourist' (or 'reader'), part send-up of fantasy literature's cliches ... ") Also preceding the title page is a phoney list of ten "Other Tough Guides" such as The Tough Guide to Transport in the Multiverse (mostly by Telephone Box). The Guide proper begins with a generic "Map of Fantasyland", "How to Use This Book", and a key to the marginal symbols ("Identification Symbols"), all preceding the alphabetical catalogue: A, Adept to Z, Zombies (pages 1–234).

Along these lines the Guide catalogues many of the common places, peoples, artifacts, situations, characters and events likely to be found on such a journey – in other words, the archetypes and clichés found in fantasy fiction.

The Tough Guide comprises several hundred articles organised alphabetically, ranging from a couple of sentences to a couple of pages. Short entries may convey the nature of the work in some respects.

INDUSTRY. Apart from a bit of pottery and light metalwork or some slagheaps around the domain of the DARK LORD, most Tours encounter no industry at all. Even the EMBROIDERY factories are kept well out of sight.

See also ECONOMY.

SPORT. The only real sport is FIGHTS. Those who can, train fiercely and take on everyone. Those who can't watch GLADIATORS and lay BETS.

See also GAMES and GAMING.

There are entries for Dark Lords and what they do, magic swords and where they come from, haunted forests and what they contain, and so on. It can all be read as a thinly veiled criticism of the fantasy genre as overly derivative, clichéd, and unimaginative. Alternatively it can be seen as an affectionate study of the themes and ideas that resonate through fantasy writing. The tone is generally tongue-in-cheek, with such explanations as why there are Dark Lords but no Dark Ladies, why casual sex in Fantasyland almost never results in pregnancy, and why male virginity is useless whereas female virginity is highly prized.

== Publication history ==
The first edition Tough Guide (Vista, 1996, ISBN 0-575-60106-X) was a 223-page paperback. It was reissued in paperback by Gollancz in 1997 and first published in the US by DAW Books in 1998, both in paperback. (Note: Notes by one contributor of data to ISFDB include basic questions about the first US edition. Among others, does "98 Miles Short" really assert copyright of the map artist or is it a joke? First U.S. edition at ISFDB.) There was a hardcover Science Fiction Book Club edition in 1999 (US) and Gollancz issued a "mini-hardcover" in 2004 (UK).

The Guide was heavily revised for the 2006 Firebird / Penguin edition. The guidebook metaphor was enhanced in many ways: the map was re-done, clip art eliminated, insets included (mimicking contemporary guidebook layout), "Tough Guides" to other non-existent places referenced and listed, and so on.

About two dozen symbolic silhouettes in the margin identify "Food" (a fork and knife), "Cliche" (the letter 'C'), and so on.

The new front cover design mimicked some guidebooks, with "The Essential Guide to Fantasy Travel (Revised and Updated Edition)" along the top edge and a mock rubber stamp "Dark Lord approved!" in the illustration.

== Reception ==
Jonathan Palmer reviewed The Tough Guide to Fantasyland for Arcane magazine, rating it a 7 out of 10 overall. Palmer comments that "although there are some audible chuckles to be had, the Guide is not a side-splitter (unlike Henry Root's World of Knowledge, to which it owes a considerable debt), but it is welcome fillip to those who feel that Fantasyland has become a little predictable. For [the price], this book is recommended".

The Tough Guide was a finalist for the 1997 Hugo Award for Best Related Work, and for a World Fantasy Award, year's best special contribution, professional. It was voted third place for a Locus Award, year's best nonfiction book.

== See also ==
- Fantasy trope
