= Hexwood =

1993 novel by Diana Wynne Jones

- First edition cover
- Author: Diana Wynne Jones
- Language: English
- Genre: Fantasy, science fiction, young adult literature
- Publisher: Methuen Publishing
- Publication date: 1993
- Publication place: United Kingdom
- Media type: Print
- Pages: 288
- ISBN: 0-416-18846-X
- OCLC: 29472956

Hexwood is a 1993 fantasy/science fiction novel for young adults, written by British author Diana Wynne Jones.

The book was dedicated to author Neil Gaiman, who later wrote a poem about the honor and gave it to Jones.

Jones said of the book that "it's very strange but people who've read it so far say that it's absolutely fascinating, I mean it's really weird—I couldn't begin to describe it. It demanded to be written back to front and sideways".

== Plot summary ==
The Sector Controller, who is responsible for overseeing Earth, among other worlds, receives a message that a mysterious machine called the Bannus has been activated (against orders) at Hexwood Farm Estate near London by the man who was responsible for maintaining the facility. Somehow, the Bannus has trapped both that man and an entire maintenance team inside the Estate. Following instructions in case of such an accident, the Sector Controller sends a message to the Reigners, the five people who rule the galaxy.

In a wood, an amnesiac boy meets an android. The android, who is called Yam, tells him that his name is Hume, because he is a human.

In a small village near London, a teenage girl, Ann Stavely, recovers from a serious fever. While ill, she talks with the four voices in her head: The King, The Prisoner, The Boy, and The Slave. Through her window, she witnesses mysterious comings and goings at nearby Hexwood Farm Estate: a van with a symbol like a pair of unbalanced scales on the side pulls up and people go in, but they do not come out again. After many different people go in, but none come out, Ann becomes curious and is determined to find out more.

The next day, greatly recovered, she explores the tiny woods beside Hexwood Farm. When she enters it, she finds that the woods have expanded, and she encounters a futuristic chamber with a famished, exceptionally tall and skeletal man, Mordion Agenos, inside. He claims he has been asleep for centuries, but Ann knows she saw him enter Hexwood Farm just a few days ago.

Mordion creates a boy from a pool of his and Ann's mingled blood, and sends him off on his own into the woods. The boy appears to be Hume. Ann is horrified by Mordion's callous attitude and tells him that he must look after Hume, since he created him.

Ann visits Mordion and Hume several times in the woods over the next few days, but on different visits Hume is years older or younger. While she is in her own town, she and her brother see more and more people appearing to enter Hexwood Farm Estate and still none ever emerge. During one of her visits to Mordion and Hume, she helps Hume recover Yam from what looks like a future, ruined Hexwood Farm, where they encounter and escape from armored men armed with crossbows. Yam then tells Mordion, Ann, and Hume that they are all in the field of the Bannus, which warps time and space in order to run scenarios for some mysterious purpose. This is why things seem to be happening out of order.

The situation at Hexwood is being monitored by the five Reigners, tyrants who have ruled the galaxy for over a thousand years. They are concerned about the Bannus, which, before they seized power, was a cyborg designed to test and pick new Reigners. Reigner Two and the Reigner's Servant (Mordion) have disappeared while trying to deactivate the Bannus. The remaining Reigners go to Earth (Reigners Four and Five alone, then Three and One together) to turn off the Bannus, but they too get caught in the Bannus' field of influence. They find themselves in the huge forest, which is somehow the little wood beside Hexwood Farm, and eventually forget their identities and take on roles as characters within the Arthurian landscape in the forest.

Vierran of House Guaranty, one of the major guild houses ruled by the Reigners, is a young woman works in the Reigners' basement, managing costuming for when the Reigners or their servants need to travel to a distant world. She has repeatedly worked with the Reigner's Servant and assassin, Mordion Agenos, and considers herself a friend of his. When Reigner One and Reigner Three come to Earth, they take Vierran as a luggage-carrying assistant.

The Bannus is playing with the minds of all the characters and running scenarios in order to determine who the next five Reigners should be. He is also getting his revenge on the current Reigners, who locked him away on Earth so they could permanently remain in power. The Bannus has confused several of the characters as to who they are in order to run these scenarios. Vierran and Ann turn out to be different representations of the same person, Vierran of the House of Guaranty. Mordion Agenos is the Reigners' Servant, and by looking after Hume, is making up for when he was a child and failed to protect other children in the Reigners' care. Hume turns out to be Merlin, and "Ann's" brother is discovered to be Fitela, a dragon-slayer mentioned in "Beowulf".

Yam turns out to be the Bannus itself; by getting Mordion to repair the broken Yam, he was returning the Bannus to full power. Several other characters in the book turn out to be other legendary figures of note and the Reigners are all ousted and punished. Mordion and Vierran are selected by the Bannus to be two of the five new Reigners.

== Principal characters ==
Characters' true identities are shown in bold:

- **Mordion Agenos** is the Reigners' Servant, and known to his voices as the Slave. He is later appointed as the First Reigner.
- Ann Stavely is **Vierran, of the House of Guaranty**, and known to her voices as the Girl Child. She is later appointed as the Second Reigner.
- Hume is **Martellian Pender** and also known as Merlin, of Arthurian legend. Known to his voices as the Prisoner, he later becomes the Third Reigner.
- Sir Artegal is **Arthur Pendragon** aka King Arthur. Known to his voices as the King, he later becomes the Fourth Reigner.
- Martin Stavely is "Ann's" brother, whose real name is **Fitela Wolfson**, a dragonslayer who briefly appears in Beowulf, and a descendant of Merlin/Hume. Known to his voices as the Boy, he later becomes the Fifth Reigner.
- Yam (Yamaha) is **The Bannus**, a machine designed to make sure that the process of selection of the Reigners would be absolutely fair.
- The Dragon is Orm Pender, the original **Reigner One**.
- King Ambitas is the original **Reigner Two**. Ambitas and Mordion represent different aspects of the Fisher King in the Arthurian legends.
- Morgan La Trey: is the original **Reigner Three**.
- Sir Fors: **Four**
- Sir Harrisoun: **Harrison Scudamore** is the new and unpleasant owner of Hexwood Farm Estate. He started the Bannus running again, in order to play a role-playing game, preferably involving hobbits on a Grail Quest.
- Lady Sylvia is **Siri, of the House of Guaranty** and Vierran's cousin.

== Reception ==
Hexwood received mostly positive reviews: Kirkus Reviews called it "an elaborate, fascinating, and superbly crafted adventure", School Library Journal praised it for its "knife-sharp prose" and for being a "marvelously mind-stretching" book, while Booklist said it was a "satisfying tale" and that "[t]he action is fast paced, the mysterious circumstances are compelling, and there's even a nice bit of humor". Books For Keeps were more noncommittal, noting simply that it would need a "doughty readership", describing the novel as "a demanding read" with "page after page of challenging ideas". Publishers Weekly was critical of the novel, due to its "muddled narrative" and "confusing finale".
