= The Homeward Bounders =

Fantasy novel by Diana Wynne Jones

- First edition (UK)
- Author: Diana Wynne Jones
- Cover artist: Graham Townsend
- Language: English
- Genre: Children's fantasy novel
- Publisher: Macmillan
- Publication date: 1981
- Publication place: United Kingdom
- Media type: Print (hardback & paperback)
- ISBN: 9780333309797
- OCLC: 872671513

The Homeward Bounders is a fantasy novel by Diana Wynne Jones in which a vast series of parallel universes serve as the game-boards for a race of demons that delight in war-games and fantasy-games.

== Plot summary ==
Twelve-year-old Jamie discovers a strange place in his hometown in which mysterious and demonic entities, known only as Them, are playing a board game with the entire world. Upon his discovering Them, They are forced to make Jamie a Homeward Bounder; this means he must constantly travel from world to world until he finds his home again. Homeward Bounders cannot die, and must not interfere with Play. If he can reach his home he may stay, and re-enter play. No-one is allowed to interfere directly with the Homeward Bounders; for example, if someone were to attempt to hurt or steal from Jamie, that person would die mysteriously.

In his travels through the many worlds, Jamie meets the Flying Dutchman, with his ship and crew, and Ahasuerus, the Wandering Jew. In addition, he meets a strange entity chained to a rock by Them. Every day, a Vulture comes to peck at him. While he is never named, the entity is Prometheus (he states that his name means "foresight" and that, according to legend, he was punished for bringing fire to humanity). Jamie becomes skilled at travelling, learning to read the signs left by other Homeward Bounders, growing fluent in many languages and proficient in many unusual skills.

Jamie wanders through the worlds, time passing, never reaching his home, yet hardly aging at all, until he meets Helen Haras-Uquara, from the barbaric world of Uquar. She has an ability to change her right arm into anything at all (for instance, an elephant trunk or a snake). Helen has only recently become a Homeward Bounder, because she, like Jamie, has seen Them playing Their game with the worlds. Although she has no experience with anything much, having been shut in a temple for most of her life, she proves to be a resourceful and intelligent person; her knowledge of Them, which mainly comes from the teachings of Uquar, her god, turns out to be very useful.

Helen and Jamie travel together until they meet Joris, another new Homeward Bounder, who was a slave and apprentice demon hunter from another world, separated from his master by a demon that showed him Them. The three travel together until they come to a world in which they meet Adam and Vanessa.

This world is like our current world, and is also strongly reminiscent of Jamie's home world. He is sure that if they could just travel on one or two worlds more he would reach his Home. The Homeward Bounders convince Adam and Vanessa that They exist, when Konstam, Joris' demon-hunting-master arrives, and joins their party. Konstam is eager to fight this new kind of demon, if only because of the challenge that They present, and the six invade Their strange place and try to defeat Them. The attack goes awry, however, and all six of them are made into Homeward Bounders. This fills the Bounder circuits to their maximum capacity; in effect, this means that They cannot create any more Homeward Bounders, and also They must play by Their own rules.

Jamie awakens, alone, and realizes that Adam and Vanessa's world is his Home, only 100 years too late. He recognizes a photo of Adam and Vanessa's grandmother when she was young; it was his little sister, grown up. He realizes that although he did not age during his time on the Bounder circuits, time was still passing on his Home world, and his family and his Home world have gone forever. They are cheating; his world is gone. He has no home to go to.

His hope of ever returning home crushed, he returns to the mysterious entity chained to a rock, and inadvertently frees him, as only one without hope can free him. With his help, Jamie rallies all the Homeward Bounders, and they make a frontal assault on the main base of Them, and destroy many of Them and also Their special place, known as "The Real Place".

Everyone is returned to their respective home worlds, except for Jamie. Since his home is gone, he chooses to continue to wander through the worlds, so as to keep The Real Place in all the worlds, not just in one place, as They did. In the end, Jamie stops Them from returning for at least a few centuries, by giving up any hope of a normal life and having to endure watching his friends die while he stays young.

== Reception ==
Kirkus Reviews considered it to be "elaborate and intricate" and a "chilly scenario", recommending it for "admirers of cerebral puzzle-fantasy". James Nicoll lauded Jones for being able to "introduce all of her characters, outline the rules of her setting, and make her way through a complete plot in 267 pages".

Dave Langford reviewed The Homeward Bounders for White Dwarf #53, and stated that "few writers can bring off this sort of thing, but Jones does. She has the trick of conviction and empathy, of larding the narrative with humour where appropriate and thus heightening the desolation and horror elsewhere. A powerful little book".
