= Fire and Hemlock =

1984 novel by Diana Wynne Jones

- First edition (US)
- Author: Diana Wynne Jones
- Language: English
- Genre: Fantasy
- Publisher: Greenwillow Books (US); Methuen (UK)
- Publication date: 1984 (US); 1985 (UK)
- Publication place: Great Britain
- Media type: Print
- ISBN: 0-688-03942-1

Fire and Hemlock is a modern fantasy by British author Diana Wynne Jones, based largely on the Anglo-Scottish Border ballads "Tam Lin" and "Thomas the Rhymer".

It was first published in 1984 in the United States by Greenwillow Books then in 1985 in Great Britain by Methuen Children's Books. It has been republished several times since then in paperback, by various publishers. In-print versions are published by Collins in Britain and by HarperTeen in the United States, both divisions of HarperCollins. Firebird, an imprint of Penguin Group, released a new paperback edition on 12 April 2012.

Fire and Hemlock was a Phoenix Award Honor Book in 2005.

== Plot summary ==
As she clears out her old bedroom, Polly discovers that below her memories, in which she led an entirely normal and unremarkable life, there is a second set of memories, which are rather unusual.

As Polly thinks back to this "second set" of memories, the point where they seem to diverge is when she stumbled into a funeral in an old mansion, Hunsdon House, when she was ten and playing with her best friend, Nina. There, she was approached by a man named Thomas Lynn who took her back outside and kept her company. He takes her back inside to help him select six pictures from a large pile, his share of the estate of the deceased; one of them is a photograph called "Fire and Hemlock" (hence the name of the novel), which he gave to her. He then takes her back to her grandmother's house, where she is living.

Over the following years Tom and Polly continue a friendship largely through correspondence, with occasional visits. Tom sends her books and letters with stories in them, many of which tie into the general theme of his predicament. Together, the two come up with stories about a hero named Tan Coul and his assistant Hero, who are Mr. Lynn's and Polly's alter egos, respectively. These stories all eventually come true, after a fashion. For instance, after discussing Tan Coul's horse, they encounter an identical horse disrupting traffic in the streets of London, having escaped from a nearby circus. An invented town and hardware store later turn out to be real, the proprietor being the spitting image of Tom, and his nephew Leslie falling into the story much later as a possible victim of Laurel's. Tom and Polly's story features three other heroes; later on, Tom gives Polly a photograph of all the members of his orchestra, and asks her to identify them. She immediately finds the other three heroes. These three are exactly the ones with whom Tom was considering setting up an independent string quartet.

All the while, Polly encounters members of Tom's ex-wife's family, all of whom seem to be threatening her and trying to break off her relationship with Tom. These include Seb, who is a few years older than Polly. Polly understands the threats as Laurel (Tom's ex-wife) having some sort of power over him. Tom refuses to talk about it.

This friendship develops against the background of Polly's growing up in her own disintegrating family life: her father Reg leaves, and a new lodger moves in and begins a relationship with her mother, Ivy. When Ivy sends her to live with her father in Bristol, it soon becomes apparent that she was not wanted there, her father having neither told his girlfriend that she was coming nor that she was supposed to live with them permanently. Eventually Polly moves in with her grandmother, who acts as a strong, fierce, strict anchor in her life.

As Polly turns sixteen, she realises that she has always loved Tom, but when she is rejected by him (in part because of their age difference, but also for her own safety, as she later discovers) she sets out to discover the secret of his relationship with the sinister Laurel that is somehow connected to all the supernatural events that happen to Tom and her. To do this, she performs voodoo-like ceremony, and it partly succeeds – she is summoned to Hunsdon House, where it all started. Laurel is there, but humiliates Polly and tells her (untruthfully) that Tom is dying of cancer, and wants to be left alone by her. Mortified, Polly agrees to forget him, and leaves. Her second set of memories ends here.

Three years later, sitting in front of the picture (that she now realizes was a gift from Tom) Polly decides to start investigating, and finds out that all memory of Tom has been erased from her life, and that he has been eradicated from the memories of anyone who should have known him. As well as this, other people that she met in connection with Tom have no idea who she is, her friend Nina believes that Polly stopped talking to her years ago, and friends that she met through Tom have apparently never met her. She becomes frustrated, and is determined to find Tom, the man she knew and still loves.

In this she is aided by reading two ballads, Tam Lin and Thomas the Rhymer, which help her figure out the truth. In reality, Tom has entered into a deal with the so-called Queen of the Fairies – Laurel. The time has now come when he must give his life to prolong that of her husband, the sinister Morton Leroy, the King of the Fairies.

Using the information in the ballads as an instruction, she arrives at the ceremony over which Laurel is presiding, and manages to outwit her and secure Tom's life, and, depending on the way you interpret the strange happenings of the ending, his love.

== Characters ==
- Polly Whittacker is the main protagonist.
- Thomas Lynn who shares a special relationship with Polly, and whom Polly must rescue from Laurel.
- Granny is Polly's paternal grandmother whom Polly goes to live with at the age of ten.
- Laurel is the antagonist, or the "Queen of the Faeries" in this retelling.
- Ivy is Polly's mother.
- Nina is Polly's childhood friend. In Polly's "revised" set of memories, her friendship with Nina was erased.
- Fiona Perks who becomes Polly's good friend and later her flatmate, and is instrumental in verifying the existence of Tom later on.

== Major themes ==
Feminism – The original story of Tam Lin is one of a resourceful and brave young girl named Janet who rescues her lover from the faeries. When Jones was writing this novel, she knew that she needed "a narrative structure which did not simply put a female in a male's place". However, through most of the book Polly is a tomboy. In the stories she and Tom tell, she casts herself in the role of "Hero", Tom Lynn's girl assistant, who must disguise herself as a boy.

== Allusions to other works ==
This story explicitly mirrors the folktale of Tam Lin, which existed since at least the mid-sixteenth century. Diana Wynne Jones wrote that her goal was "to write a book in which modern life and heroic mythical events approached one another so closely that they were nearly impossible to separate." The funeral building represents Carterhaugh. Tom Lynn is Tam Lin, who is being used as a tithe to Hell. His ex-wife Laurel represents the Queen of the Faeries. Polly directly identifies herself with Janet, after reading the Oxford Book of Ballads, and thinks she "can only hope she might manage to do what Janet had done".

The overall structure of the book is modeled after T.S. Eliot's Four Quartets, which in Jones' words "combines static meditation with movement in an extraordinary way, to become a quest of the mind away from the Nothing of spiritual death (Hemlock), towards the Fire which is imagination and redemption – the Nowhere."

== References to other works ==
As Polly grows up, Tom Lynn sends her books, many of which are intended to inform her indirectly of his pact with Laurel. He says at one point, regarding a book of fairy stories, "Only thin, weak thinkers despise fairy stories. Each one has a true, strange fact in it, you know, which you can find if you look.".

These include The Golden Bough, East of the Sun and West of the Moon, and The Oxford Book of Ballads (which contains both Thomas the Rhymer and Tam Lin).

After reading The Three Musketeers by Alexandre Dumas, Polly refers to herself as Porthos (her favourite character) in the clandestine letters she mails to Tom. Later in the book, Tom and his friends form a string quartet under the name of The Dumas Quartet, and assigns aliases to each member; Tom is Athos.

Polly reads The Lord of the Rings and writes a long story in which her alter ego Hero bravely destroys a dangerous ring. She posts it to Tom and is crushed when he tersely writes back "Use your own ideas."

There are many other passing references to other works of literature, art, and music found throughout the book.

=== Literature ===
There are 12 books that Polly receives for Christmas. Tom Lynn includes a note with them saying that the bookstore he bought them from said that they are books that no one should grow up without reading. Of these 12, only 7 are named.

1. The Wizard of Oz
2. Five Children and It
3. The Treasure Seekers
4. The Wolves of Willoughby Chase
5. The Box of Delights
6. The Lion, the Witch and the Wardrobe
7. The Sword in the Stone
- Other books mentioned: Don Quixote, The Hundred and One Dalmatians, Henrietta's House (by Elizabeth Goudge, a book which includes its own list of books recommended for a girl to read), Uncle Tom's Cabin, Black Beauty, Sherlock Holmes, Tom's Midnight Garden, Kim, The War of the Worlds, Twelfth Night, Perelandra, The Man Who Was Thursday, The Napoleon of Notting Hill, and The Thirty-Nine Steps.

=== Art ===
There are 5 paintings and a photo that Lynn receives at the funeral. All of them are described as quite valuable.

1. "A green, sunlit picture of old-fashioned people having a picnic in a wood." This is most likely Édouard Manet's Le déjeuner sur l'herbe based on the description.
2. "A strange, tilted view of a fairground." It is unclear exactly what painting or artist that Diana Wynne Jones was referencing when she gave this description.
3. "A lovely Chinese picture of a horse." Again, it is unclear without more description exactly which painting is being referenced.
4. "Some sad pink-and-blue Harlequins beside the sea." This painting is later revealed to be a Picasso and that one clown is adult-sized while the other one is child-sized.
5. "A swirly modern painting of people playing violins."
6. "A big blue-green picture of a fire at dusk where smoke was beginning to wreathe round the vast skeleton of a plant like cow parsley in front." Diana herself mentions that this is a photo that she had in her possession at one time. Not much else is known about it.

One other painting that is worth mentioning is John Pettie's The Vigil. Mr. Lynn calls it "soppy" when Polly shows it to him.

=== Music ===
- Beethoven's Third

== Reception ==
Dave Langford reviewed Fire and Hemlock for White Dwarf #96, and stated that "There's almost too much complication in this ambitious book. When the fireworks finally begin to erupt in earnest, the change of pace from earlier, leisurely enigmas is liable to leave you battered and baffled. Read it warily."

== Reviews ==
- Review by Faren Miller (1984) in Locus, #285 October 1984
- Review by Gary Zacharias (1985) in Fantasy Review, May 1985
- Review by Maureen Kincaid Speller [as by Maureen Porter] (1986) in Vector 131
- Review by Gwyneth Jones (1986) in Foundation, #36 Summer 1986
- Review by Mary Frances Zambreno (1987) in American Fantasy, Winter 1987
- Review by Bruce Gillespie (1989) in SF Commentary, #67
- Review by Andy Sawyer (1990) in Paperback Inferno, #86
- Review by Benjamin Dowell (1990) in Fear, November 1990

== See also ==
- List of fiction works about Halloween
