= Diana Wynne Jones =

British writer (1934–2011)

- Born: 16 August 1934; London, England
- Died: 26 March 2011 (aged 76); Bristol, England
- Education: St Anne's College, Oxford
- Occupation: Novelist
- Spouse: John Burrow (m. 1956)
- Children: 3
- Writing career
- Years active: 1968–2011
- Genres: Science fiction, speculative fiction, children's, fantasy, comic fantasy
- Subjects: Fantasy fiction, science fiction, surrealism
- Notable works: Chrestomanci series; Dalemark Quartet; Howl's Moving Castle
- Notable awards: Guardian Prize; 1978; Mythopoeic Award; 1996, 1999; Karl Edward Wagner Award; 1999; World Fantasy Award for Life Achievement; 2007
- Movement: Postmodernism

Diana Wynne Jones (16 August 1934 – 26 March 2011) was a British novelist, poet, academic, literary critic, and short story writer. She principally wrote speculative fiction novels for children and young adults. Although usually described as fantasy, her work also incorporates science fiction themes like time travel and parallel universes, and elements of realism. Some of her best-known works are the Chrestomanci heptalogy, the Dalemark Quartet, the Moving Castle trilogy, Dark Lord of Derkholm, and The Tough Guide to Fantasyland.

Jones has been cited as an inspiration and muse for several fantasy and science fiction authors including Philip Pullman, Terry Pratchett, Penelope Lively, Robin McKinley, Dina Rabinovitch, Megan Whalen Turner, J. K. Rowling and Neil Gaiman, with Gaiman describing her as "quite simply the best writer for children of her generation". Her work has been nominated for several awards. She was twice a finalist for the Hugo Award, nominated fourteen times for the Locus Award, seven times for the Mythopoeic Award (which she won twice), twice for a British Fantasy Award (won in 1999), and twice for a World Fantasy Award, which she won in 2007.

== Early life and marriage ==
Jones was born in London, the daughter of Marjorie (née Jackson) and Richard Aneurin Jones, both of whom were teachers. When war was announced, shortly after her fifth birthday, she was evacuated to Pontarddulais in Wales where her grandfather was a minister at a chapel. She did not live long in Wales due to a family dispute, and thereafter moved several times, including periods in the Lake District, in York, and back to London. In 1943 her family finally settled in Thaxted, Essex, where her parents worked running an educational conference centre. There, Jones and her two younger sisters Isobel (later Professor Isobel Armstrong, the literary critic) and Ursula (later an actress and a children's writer) spent a childhood left chiefly to their own devices.

After attending Friends' School, Saffron Walden, she studied English at St Anne's College, Oxford, where she attended lectures by both C. S. Lewis and J. R. R. Tolkien before graduating in 1956. In the same year she married John Burrow, a scholar of medieval literature, with whom she had three sons. After a brief period in London, in 1957 the couple returned to Oxford, where they stayed until moving to Bristol in 1976.

== Career ==
"He spread his arms and language rolled from him, sonorous, magnificent, and rhythmic.. for years after that, I used to dream regularly that a piece of my bedroom wall slid aside revealing my grandfather declaiming in Welsh, and I knew he was declaiming about my sins. At the bottom of my mind there is always a flow of spoken language that is not English, rolling in majestic paragraphs and resounding with splendid polysyllables. I listen to it like music when I write."

– An excerpt from her autobiography detailing her time in Wales with her grandfather.

— Diana Wynne Jones, Reflections on the magic of writing – Random House, 2012.

Jones started writing during the mid-1960s "mostly to keep [her] sanity", when the youngest of her three children was about two years old and the family lived in a house owned by an Oxford college. Besides the children, she felt harried by the crises of adults in the household: a sick husband, a mother-in-law, a sister, and a friend with daughter. Her first book was a novel for adults published by Macmillan in 1970, entitled Changeover. It originated as the British Empire was divesting colonies; she recalled in 2004 that it had "seemed like every month, we would hear that yet another small island or tiny country had been granted independence." Changeover is set in a fictional African colony during transition, and what begins as a memo about the problem of how to "mark changeover" ceremonially is misunderstood to be about the threat of a terrorist named Mark Changeover. It is a farce with a large cast of characters, featuring government, police, and army bureaucracies; sex, politics, and news. In 1965, when Rhodesia declared independence unilaterally (one of the last colonies and not tiny), "I felt as if the book were coming true as I wrote it."

The Harry Potter books are frequently compared to the works of Diana Wynne Jones. Much of Jones's work went out of print but was re-issued after interest in fantasy and reading was spurred by Harry Potter.

Jones's works are also compared to those of Robin McKinley and Neil Gaiman. She was friends with both McKinley and Gaiman, and Jones and Gaiman were fans of each other's work; she dedicated her 1993 novel Hexwood to him after something he said in conversation inspired a key part of the plot. Gaiman had already dedicated his 1991 four-part comic book mini-series The Books of Magic to "four witches", of whom Jones was one.

For Charmed Life, the first Chrestomanci novel, Jones won the 1978 Guardian Children's Fiction Prize, a once-in-a-lifetime award by The Guardian newspaper that is judged by a panel of children's writers. Three times she was a commended runner-up (Note: Today there are usually eight books on the Carnegie shortlist. According to CCSU, some runners-up through 2002 were Commended (from 1955) or Highly Commended (from 1966); the latter distinction became approximately annual in 1979. There were about 160 commendations of both kinds in 48 years including two for 1975, three for 1977, and six for 1988.) for the Carnegie Medal from the Library Association, recognising the year's best children's book: for Dogsbody (1975), Charmed Life (1977), and the fourth Chrestomanci book The Lives of Christopher Chant (1988). She won the Mythopoeic Fantasy Award, children's section, in 1996 for The Crown of Dalemark (concluding that series) and in 1999 for Dark Lord of Derkholm; in four other years she was a finalist for the annual literary award by the Mythopoeic Society. (Note: Fire and Hemlock was one of six finalists for the Mythopoeic Award in 1986, when there was a single Fantasy award, and Jones was five times one of four or five finalists in the Children's category after dual fiction awards were introduced in 1992.)

The 1986 novel Howl's Moving Castle was inspired by a boy at a school she was visiting, who asked her to write a book called The Moving Castle. It was published first by Greenwillow in the U.S., where it was a runner-up for the annual Boston Globe–Horn Book Award in children's fiction. In 2004, Hayao Miyazaki made the Japanese-language animated movie Howl's Moving Castle, which was nominated for the Academy Award for Best Animated Feature. A version dubbed in English was released in the UK and US in 2005, with the voice of Howl performed by Christian Bale. Next year Jones and the novel won the annual Phoenix Award from the Children's Literature Association, recognising the best children's book published twenty years earlier that did not win a major award (named for mythical bird phoenix to suggest the book's rise from obscurity).

Fire and Hemlock had been the 2005 Phoenix runner-up. It is a novel based on Scottish ballads, and was a Mythopoeic Fantasy finalist in its own time.

Archer's Goon (1984) was a runner-up for that year's Horn Book Award. It was adapted for television in 1992. One Jones fansite believes it to be "the only tv adaptation (so far) of one of Diana's books".

Jones's book on clichés in fantasy fiction, The Tough Guide To Fantasyland (nonfiction), has a cult following among writers and critics, despite initially being difficult to find due to an erratic printing history. It was reissued in the UK, and has been reissued in the United States in 2006 by Firebird Books. The Firebird edition has additional material and a completely new design, including a new map.

The British Fantasy Society recognised her significant impact on fantasy with its Karl Edward Wagner Award in 1999. She received an honorary D.Litt from the University of Bristol in July 2006 and the World Fantasy Award for Life Achievement in 2007.

In August 2014, Google commemorated Jones with a Google Doodle created by Google artist Sophie Diao.

== Illness and death ==
Jones was diagnosed with lung cancer in the early summer of 2009. She underwent surgery in July and reported to friends that the procedure had been successful. However, in June 2010 she announced that she would be discontinuing chemotherapy because it only made her feel ill. She died on 26 March 2011 from the disease.

The story in progress when she became too ill to write, The Islands of Chaldea, was completed by her sister Ursula Jones in 2014. Interviewed by The Guardian in June 2013 after she finished the Chaldea story, Ursula Jones said that "other things were coming to light ... She left behind a mass of stuff." A collection of her poems and a book containing four plays and a screenplay have since been published, both by Moondust Books.

== Selected awards and honours ==
Jones has been nominated for and also won multiple awards for her various works.

Year	Organization	Award title, Category	Work	Result	Refs
1985	World Fantasy Convention	World Fantasy Award, Novel	Archer's Goon	Nominated	
1986	Mythopoeic Society	Mythopoeic Awards, Fantasy Award	Fire and Hemlock	Nominated	
1992	Mythopoeic Society	Mythopoeic Awards, Fantasy Award for Children's Literature	Castle in the Air	Nominated	
1996	Mythopoeic Society	Mythopoeic Awards, Fantasy Award for Children's Literature	The Crown of Dalemark	Won	
1997	Worldcon	Hugo Award, Hugo Award for Best Related Work	The Tough Guide to Fantasyland	Nominated	
1997	Locus	Locus Award, Best Non-fiction	The Tough Guide to Fantasyland	3	
1997	World Fantasy Convention	World Fantasy Award, Special Award—Professional	The Tough Guide to Fantasyland	Nominated	
1999	British Fantasy Society	British Fantasy Award, Karl Edward Wagner Award	-	Won	
1999	Mythopoeic Society	Mythopoeic Awards, Fantasy Award for Children's Literature	Dark Lord of Derkholm	Won	
2004	Locus	Locus Award, Best Young Adult Book	The Merlin Conspiracy	3	
2007	Mythopoeic Society	Mythopoeic Awards, Fantasy Award for Children's Literature	The Pinhoe Egg	Nominated	
2007	World Fantasy Convention	World Fantasy Award, Life Achievement	-	Won	
2009	Mythopoeic Society	Mythopoeic Awards, Fantasy Award for Children's Literature	House of Many Ways	Nominated	
2011	Locus	Locus Award, Best Young Adult Book	Enchanted Glass	5	
2013	British Fantasy Society	British Fantasy Award, Best Non-Fiction	Reflections: On the Magic of Writing	Nominated	
2015	Mythopoeic Society	Mythopoeic Awards, Fantasy Award for Children's Literature	The Islands of Chaldea	Nominated	
