= Indian War of Independence =

Indian War of Independence may refer to:

- Indian Rebellion of 1857, rebellion in India against British rule sometimes termed the First War of Indian Independence
- India in World War II, the forces of the Azad Hind Indian National Army and the German Free India Legion rebelling against the forces of the British Raj
- World War I, Hindu–German Conspiracy to overthrow British rule in the Indian subcontinent
- India's First War of Independence (term), a term predominantly used in India to describe the Indian Rebellion of 1857
- The Indian War of Independence (book), a 1909 nationalist history of the 1857 rebellion by Vinayak Damodar Savarkar
- Indian independence movement, resulting in Indian independence in 1947

== See also ==
- Indian War (disambiguation)
- Sepoy Mutiny (disambiguation)
- First War of Independence (disambiguation)
- Great Rebellion (disambiguation)
