= History of the Andaman and Nicobar Islands =

The Andaman and Nicobar Islands is an archipelago of 572 islands of which 37 are inhabited. It is a union territory of India.

== First inhabitants ==
The earliest archaeological evidence documents some 2,210 years ago. However, genetic and cultural studies suggest that the indigenous Andamanese people may have been isolated from other populations during the Middle Paleolithic, which ended 30,000 years ago. In that time, the Andamanese have diversified into linguistically and culturally distinct territorial groups.

Another report suggests that the Nicobarese may have arrived on the islands as far back as around 15,000 years ago and the Andamanese arrived around 65,000 years ago.

The Nicobar Islands appear to have been populated by people of various backgrounds. By the time of European contact, the indigenous inhabitants had coalesced into the Nicobarese people, speaking multiple Mon-Khmer languages; and the Shompen, whose language is of uncertain affiliation. Both are unrelated to the Andamanese, but being closely related to the Austroasiatic languages in mainland Southeast Asia.

== During the Medieval Period ==
Yijing,a Chinese monk had mentioned about the Niocbar islands as the "Kingdom of Naked People" in his books when he was visiting India.

In less than twenty days I reached Foshi 佛逝. I passed six months gradually learning the Śabdavidya. The king bestowed support and sent me off to Moluoyu (This has now been changed to Shilifoshi), where I again spent two months and then changed direction toward Kedah. At the time of the twelfth lunar month, the sails were hoisted and I boarded the king’s ship headed for India. From Kedah I went north for more than ten days and reached the kingdom of Naked People.

Some Arab sources also claim to have visited the islands. They claimed that the tribes would barter for metals, and used metal spears as well as arrows.

=== Under Chola Empire ===
Rajendra I, used the Andaman and Nicobar Islands as a strategic naval base to launch an expedition against the Sriwijaya Empire (Indonesia). The Cholas called the island Ma-Nakkavaram ("great open/naked land"), found in the Thanjavur inscription of 1050 AD. European traveller Marco Polo (12th–13th century) also referred to this island as 'Necuverann' and a corrupted form of the Tamil name Nakkavaram would have led to the modern name Nicobar during the British colonial period.

=== Under Maratha Empire ===
The islands became a temporary shipping port of the Maratha Empire and its navy in the 17th century. The first empire to list the Andamans under its territory was the Maratha Empire. The Maratha admiral Kanhoji Angre established a basic naval dominance in the islands and played a role in the annexation of the islands to India.

== Colonial Period ==
=== Danish Rule ===
The history of organised European colonisation on the islands began when settlers from the Danish East India Company arrived in the Nicobar Islands on 12 December 1755. On 1 January 1756, the Nicobar Islands were made a Danish colony, first named New Denmark, and later (December 1756) Frederick's Islands (Frederiksøerne). During 1754–1756 they were administered from Tranquebar (in continental Danish India). The islands were repeatedly abandoned due to outbreaks of malaria between 14 April 1759 and 19 August 1768, from 1787 to 1807/05, 1814 to 1831, 1830 to 1834 and gradually from 1848 for good.

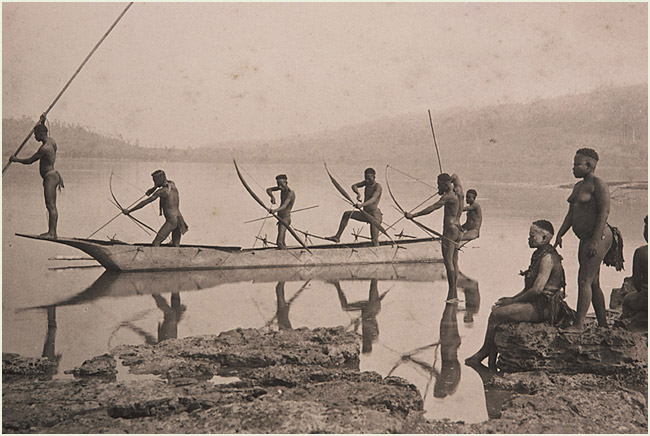
Andaman tribals fishing (c. 1870)

From 1 June 1778 to 1784, Austria mistakenly assumed that Denmark had abandoned its claims to the Nicobar Islands and attempted to establish a colony on them, renaming them Theresia Islands.

=== British Rule ===
In 1789 the British set up a naval base and penal colony on Chatham Island next to Great Andaman, where now lies the town of Port Blair. Two years later the colony was moved to Port Cornwallis on Great Andaman, but it was abandoned in 1796 due to disease.

Denmark's presence in the territory ended formally on 16 October 1868 when it sold the rights to the Nicobar Islands to Britain, which made them part of British India in 1869.

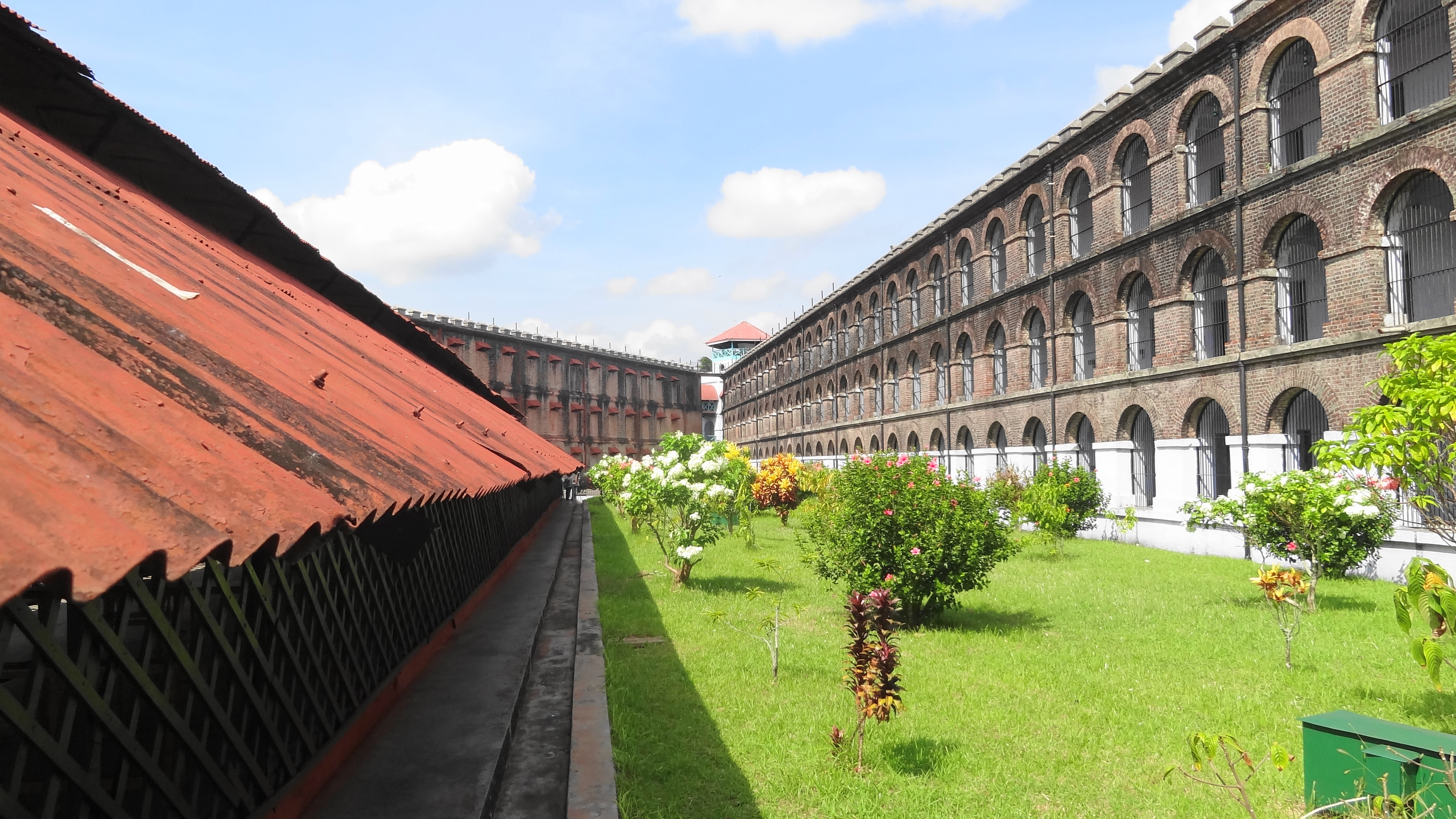
The Cellular Jail was a colonial prison used to exile political prisoners.

In 1858 the British again established a colony at Port Blair, which proved to be more permanent. The primary purpose was to set up a penal colony for criminal convicts from the Indian subcontinent. The colony came to include the infamous Cellular Jail.

In 1872 the Andaman and Nicobar islands were united under a single chief commissioner at Port Blair.

== World War II ==
During World War II, the islands were practically under Japanese control, only nominally under the authority of the Arzi Hukumate Azad Hind of Subhash Chandra Bose. Bose visited the islands during the war, and renamed them as "Shaheed-dweep" (Martyr Island) and "Swaraj-dweep" (Self-rule Island).

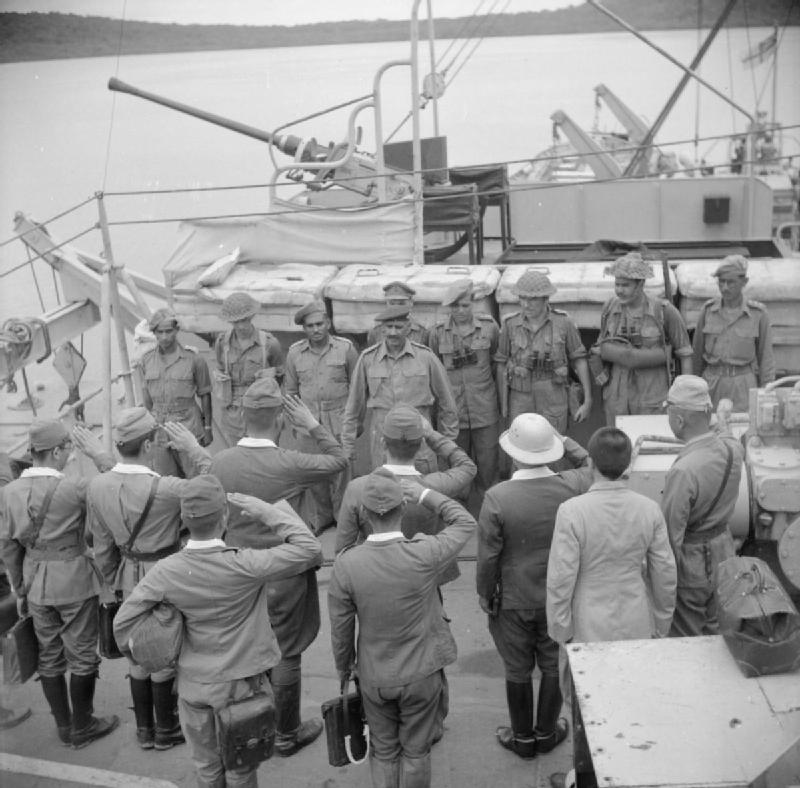
Japanese military delegation salute Lieutenant Colonel Nathu Singh, commanding officer of the Rajput Regiment, following their surrender of the Islands, 1945 CE.

General Loganathan, of the Indian National Army was made the Governor of the Andaman and Nicobar Islands. On 22 February 1944 he along with four INA officers—Major Mansoor Ali Alvi, Sub. Lt. Md. Iqbal, Lt. Suba Singh and stenographer Srinivasan—arrived at Lambaline Airport in Port Blair. On 21 March 1944 the Headquarters of the Civil Administration was established near the Gurudwara at Aberdeen Bazaar. On 2 October 1944, Col. Loganathan handed over the charge to Maj. Alvi and left Port Blair, never to return.

Japanese Vice Admiral Hara Teizo, and Major-General Tamenori Sato surrendered the islands to Brigadier J A Salomons, commander of 116th Indian Infantry Brigade, and Chief Administrator Mr Noel K Patterson, Indian Civil Service, on 7 October 1945, in a ceremony performed on the Gymkhana Ground, Port Blair.

== Post-Independence (1947 CE – present) ==
During the independence of both India (1947) and Burma (1948), the departing British announced their intention to resettle all Anglo-Indians and Anglo-Burmese on these islands to form their own nation, although this never materialized. It became part of India in 1950 and was declared as a union territory of the nation in 1956.

India has been developing defense facilities on the islands since the 1980s. The islands now have a key position in India's strategic role in the Bay of Bengal and the Malacca Strait.

=== 2004 Asian tsunami ===
On 26 December 2004, the coasts of the Andaman and Nicobar Islands were devastated by a 10 m (33 ft) massive tsunami following the undersea earthquake off Indian Ocean. More than 2,000 people lost their lives, more than 4,000 children were orphaned or suffered the loss of one parent, and a minimum of 40,000 people were rendered homeless. More than 46,000 people were injured. The worst affected Nicobar islands were Katchal and Indira Point; the latter subsided 4.25 metres (13.9 feet) and was partially submerged in the ocean. The lighthouse at Indira Point was damaged but has been repaired since then. The territory lost a large amount of area which is now submerged. The territory which was at Indian states 8,073 km^{2} (3,117 sq mi) is now at 7,950 km^{2} (3,070 sq mi).

While locals and tourist of the islands suffered the greatest casualties from the tsunami, most of the aboriginal people survived because oral traditions passed down from generations ago warned them to evacuate from large waves that follow large earthquakes.
