= Abdul Habeeb Yusuf Marfani =

Muslim businessman and philanthropist from India

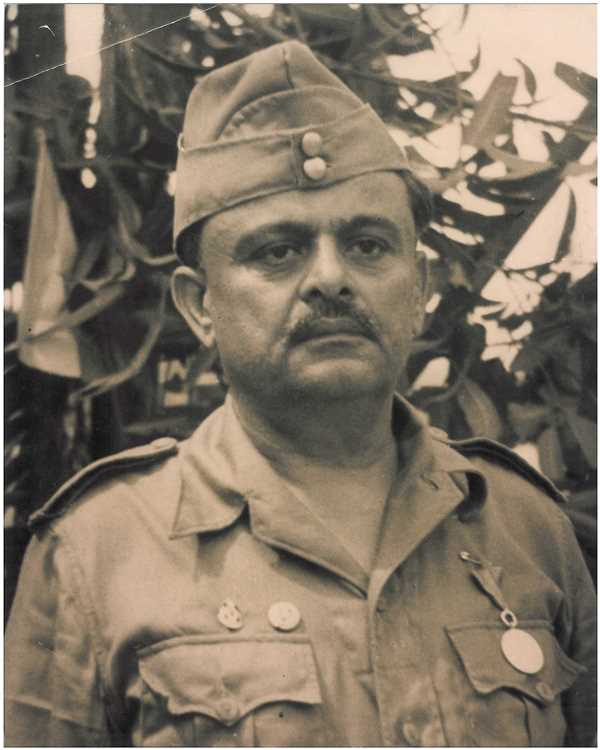
- Marfani, c. 1940s
- Born: Dhoraji, Saurashtra (state)
- Occupations: Businessman and philanthropist
- Known for: Donation to Indian National Army
- Honours: Sevak-e-Hind

Abdul Habeeb Yusuf Marfani (fl. 1940s) was a Gujarati Muslim businessman and philanthropist from Dhoraji, Saurashtra, who made significant contributions to the Indian National Army (INA) led by Subhas Chandra Bose during India’s struggle for independence. He is best known for donating his entire fortune, approximately ₹1 crore, to the INA in 1944, earning him the Sevak-e-Hind medal, the highest civilian honour of the Azad Hind government.

== Early life ==
Marfani was born in a Memon family in Dhoraji, a town in Saurashtra (present-day Gujarat, India), and later settled in Rangoon (now Yangon, Myanmar), where he established himself as a successful businessman.

== Contribution to the Indian National Army ==
In 1944, Marfani made a historic contribution to the Indian National Army, a military organization formed by Subhas Chandra Bose to fight British colonial rule. On 9 July 1944, during a public gathering in Rangoon, Marfani donated his entire fortune, estimated at ₹1 crore, which included cash, jewelry, and property deeds.

The donated amount is worth equivalent to INR 800 cr in 2022.

This donation was one of the largest individual contributions to the INA, significantly bolstering its resources for the armed struggle against British forces.

He was the first donor to the Azad Hind Bank, he also convinced other Gujaratis in Burma to donate to Azad Hind.

Marfani’s act of generosity inspired others to contribute to the INA, and Subhas Chandra Bose personally acknowledged his sacrifice, reportedly stating, "India will never forget you."

In recognition of his contribution, Marfani was awarded the Tamgha-e-Sevak-e-Hind (Sevak-e-Hind medal), the first recipient of this prestigious civilian honor instituted by the Azad Hind Sarkar, the provisional government established by Bose.

Following his donation, Marfani expressed his desire to join the INA as a soldier, but Bose advised him to continue his civilian support, recognizing his greater value as a philanthropist.

== Legacy ==
Marfani’s contribution is noted in historical accounts of the INA, with historians such as Yunus Chitalwala and Raj Mal Kasliwal documenting his role in their works.

His donation is regarded as a pivotal moment in mobilising financial support for the INA among the Indian diaspora in Southeast Asia.

Despite his significant contribution, Marfani remains a relatively unsung figure in the Indian independence movement. Recent efforts, including articles in Indian media and advocacy groups have called for posthumous recognition, such as the Bharat Ratna, India’s highest civilian award.

Currently, the Memon family resides in Myanmar. As a result, Yakub Memon, the grandson of Abdul Habeeb Yusuf Marfani, was honored by the Government of India in New Delhi for his ancestor's contributions to the Indian independence movement.
