= The Crown of Dalemark =

1993 fantasy novel by Diana Wynne Jones

- First edition
- Author: Diana Wynne Jones
- Cover artist: Geoff Taylor
- Language: English
- Series: Dalemark Quartet
- Genre: Children's fantasy novel
- Publisher: Mandarin
- Publication date: 1993
- Publication place: Great Britain
- Media type: Print (hardback & paperback)
- Pages: 493
- ISBN: 0-7497-1255-4
- Preceded by: The Spellcoats

The Crown of Dalemark is a 1993 fantasy novel by Diana Wynne Jones. It is the fourth and last book of the Dalemark Quartet, and follows the adventures of a group of people trying to reunite North and South Dalemark under a new king.

== Plot summary ==
The book is set in two parallel times; the present-day Dalemark, and the time of Mitt (Drowned Ammet) and Moril (Cart and Cwidder), some 200 years in the past. Mitt, who has recently escaped from the South and met Moril in North Dalemark, finds himself embroiled in a race to find an heir to the throne of Dalemark, which has lain empty for over 200 years, and gets mixed up in the machinations of a number of powerful forces.

Maewen, a girl from present-day Dalemark, is transported by magic back in time to assist with the restoration of the royal line. In ancient Dalemark, Noreth Onesdaughter, a twin likeness of Maewen and apparently descended directly from the ancient kings of Dalemark, asks people to accompany her on her quest to become Queen, but just before she goes to meet her followers, she disappears. Maewen is drafted to replace her, and she has to lead Noreth's followers, collect the four tokens that will prove her right to the throne, and convince everyone that she is Noreth, all the while hearing mysterious voices in the air.

Maewen sets out on her quest for the ancient crown of Dalemark with a small band of followers from the previous books in the series: Moril, Mitt, Navis Haddsson (a refugee nobleman from the South, from Drowned Ammet), Wend (the ancient magician-singer Tanamoril, Osfameron or Duck, from The Spellcoats), and Hestefan the Singer (who is eventually exposed as the evil Kankredin's agent and the murderer of Noreth). When they finally receive the crown from the One, the supreme god-like power of Dalemark, it is not Maewen who receives it, but Mitt.

As the new king, Mitt assumes the name Amil (one of the One's secret names) and continues to reunite and rebuild Dalemark as Amil the Great. Maewen goes back to her future, but she is followed by the evil Kankredin who seeks to kill her for foiling his plans in the past. This is represented as a bomb threat to the building where Maewen is. Mitt, who is one of the Undying, appears as a bomb expert, and destroys Kankredin by invoking the "strong name" of the god-like Earth Shaker, who has been helping Mitt ever since his adventures in Drowned Ammet. Mitt leaves, sending Maewen a message to wait four years to contact him, presumably until she is old enough to marry. On hearing this, Maewen decides that four years is far too long, and sets off to find him.

The Crown is a particularly interesting addition to the Dalemark series, as many of the characters from previous books are seen from quite different perspectives, not necessarily favourable. Hildrida Navissdaughter, Earl Keril of Hannart, and the singer-magician Osfameron (appearing as Wend) are notable for the negative sides of their personalities that are brought out in the book.

== Characters ==
=== Main characters ===
- Mayelbridwen Singer, called Maewen, is a 13-year girl from the present. She is sent by magic to Mitt's time in Dalemark to take part in the quest for the new king because of her remarkable likeness to the chief claimant to the crown, Noreth Onesdaughter.
- Mitt Alhammittsson is the protagonist of Drowned Ammet who escapes from the South to the North, takes part in the quest for the crown of Dalemark, and is crowned by the One as the new king of Dalemark. Mitt assumes the name Amil, one of the One's secret names, and becomes known as Amil the Great, the king who united and rebuilt Dalemark. He marries Biffa.
- Moril Clennensson (full name Osfameron Tanamoril Clennensson) is a highly talented traveling Singer who inherited his father's magic cwidder and learned to use its powers with dramatic results, both during the escape from the South in Cart and Cwidder and during the quest for the Dalemark crown in the present book.
- Navis Haddsson is the youngest son of the tyrannical Earl Hadd of Holand in South Dalemark and the father of Hildrida and Ynen (from Drowned Ammet). He escaped to the North, where he shows his organizational and military talent during the quest for the Dalemark crown. He is elevated to Duke of Kernsburgh by Amil the Great after the unification of Dalemark. The new title ensured that Navis outranked all the earls in the kingdom.
- Wend is a mysterious man working for Maewen's father. Wend transports Maewen into the past, where the past version of himself travels with Noreth Onesdaughter to guard her on her quest. Wend is really Noreth's father and one of the Elder Undying: Duck, Mage Mallard, Osfameron, and Tanamoril are all names he has gone by, and his epithet is the Wanderer.

=== Minor characters ===
- Noreth Onesdaughter is an 18-year-old girl who claims to be the One's daughter and to have a claim to the throne of Dalemark. When Noreth is murdered by Hestefan the Singer acting on orders from Earl Henda, Maewen is transported to the past by Wend to take Noreth's place because of the remarkable likeness between the two. Noreth only appears in the book at the very beginning, where she meets Mitt and declares her intention of riding to Kingsburgh, but her existence is the driving force behind the plot.
- Alk is a former lawman and the earl consort of the Countess of Aberath in the earldom of the North Dales. Physically a very large person, Alk devotes his time to inventing steam engines and eventually, almost single-handed, brings about the industrial revolution in Dalemark. Alk's trains ultimately run on the ancient green roads, a feat of civil engineering accomplished in far antiquity by King Hern, the first known king of Dalemark.
- Biffa (short for Enblith) is a very large and clever girl, who is a friend of Hildrida Navissdaughter (from Drowned Ammet) at the Gardale Lawschool. She marries Mitt after he is made King Amil and becomes Queen Enblith (not the legendary "Enblith the Fair").
- Hestefan is one of the traveling Singers from Cart and Cwidder. He participates in the quest for the Dalemark crown together with his apprentice, the young singer Moril Clennensson, but betrays the cause by becoming the agent of Kankredin and murdering Noreth Onesdaughter.
- Hildrida Navissdaughter (Hildy) is bratty and snobbish granddaughter of a southern earl who escaped to the North with Mitt and her father Navis (from Drowned Ammet). She appears briefly in this book as a student at Gardale Lawschool who is in danger of being abducted by Keril, Earl of Hannart, as part of the machinations surrounding the quest for the Dalemark crown. Hildy goes into hiding on Biffa's family farm, and after the unification of Dalemark she is appointed by Amil the Warden of the Holy Islands.
- Kialan Kerilsson is the current Adon, son of and heir to Earl Keril of Hannart. He came from north with Moril and Brid in Cart and Cwidder. Kialan disagrees with some of his father's tactics and helps free Ynen, whom Keril had been holding hostage to ensure Mitt's and Navis's behavior. He is a claimant to the throne, but feels happy enough just inheriting Hannart.
- Ynen Navisson is the son of Navis and Hildy's kind younger brother. He is a claimant to the throne, but drops out of the running early on because of his kindness. After the unification of Dalemark, Ynen becomes King Amil's Admiral-in-Chief and designs several steamships.

=== Undying ===
- The One (Adon, Amil, Oreth) is the most powerful of the Undying. After being unbound by his granddaughter Tanaqui in The Spellcoats, the One took an oath to root out Kankredin from the land.
- Kankredin is an evil magician intending to usurp the power and place of the One. In this book Kankredin, disguised as Maewen's horse, schemes to frustrate the restoration of monarchy in Dalemark by impersonating the One to Maewen and trying to force her to kill Mitt, the future king.
- Cennoreth (Tanaqui, the Weaver) is a legendary witch, mother of the Adon's second wife Manaliabrid, and weaver of Dalemark's past, present, and future. Cennoreth is Tanaqui from The Spellcoats.
- Old Ammet (Alhammitt, Ynynen, the Earthshaker) is one of the elder Undying. The Earth Shaker began assisting Mitt with his magic during the escape from the South (from Drowned Ammet) and continued to help him during the quest for the Dalemark crown and the battle against the evil Kankredin.

== Editions ==
- Greenwillow Books, 1995 (ISBN 0-688-13363-0)
- HarperTrophy paperback, 2001 (ISBN 0-06-447316-3)
- Oxford University Press (trade paperback), 2003 (ISBN 978-0-19-275277-2)
