= Dalemark Quartet =

Fantasy book series

The Dalemark Quartet is a series of four fantasy books by Diana Wynne Jones set in a rustic parallel universe with pre-industrial or even medieval civilization. Dalemark is a region by the sea divided into South Dalemark and North Dalemark, consisting of 15 earldoms (formerly called marks):

North Dalemark – 7 earldoms

- Hannart
- Gardale
- Loviath
- Aberath
- Dropwater
- Kinnarth
- North Dales

South Dalemark - 8 earldoms

- Dermath
- Holand
- Waywold
- Canderack
- Andmark
- Carrowmark
- Fenmark
- South Dales

In addition to the 15 earldoms, Dalemark includes the so-called King's Lands (the Holy Islands, the Marshes, and the Shield of Oreth), although there has been no king in Dalemark for a long time.

The earls ruling South Dalemark are presented as much more tyrannical and cruel than the North Dalemark earls, who are described as being more liberal and with greater respect for human freedoms. As a result, there is constant tension between the North and the South, which often erupts in open war or rebellion. The Great Uprising was a countrywide revolution which led to the restoration of monarchy with Amil the Great ascending to the throne of united Dalemark. The Great Uprising took place about a year after the main events described in Drowned Ammet, the second book of the Dalemark Quartet.

The Dalemark Quartet titles are listed below in the order of publication, which is different from the order of internal chronology (shown by Arabic numerals in parentheses):

- Cart and Cwidder, 1975 (3)
- Drowned Ammet, 1977 (2)
- The Spellcoats, 1979 (1)
- The Crown of Dalemark, 1993 (4)

== Gallery of book covers ==
Cart and Cwidder, book one in the series (1975)

Drowned Ammet, book two in the series (1977)

The Spellcoats, book three in the series (1979)

The Crown of Dalemark, book four in the series (1993)
