= Japanese occupation of the Andaman and Nicobar Islands =

1942–45 period during World War II

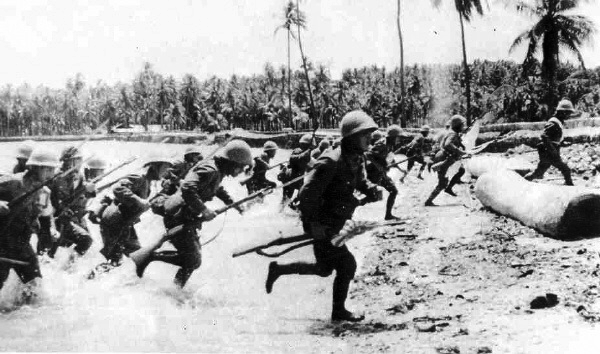
Japanese troops disembarking on Ross Island, 23 March 1942

The Japanese occupation of the Andaman and Nicobar Islands occurred in 1942 during World War II. The Andaman and Nicobar Islands (8,293 km^{2} on 139 islands), are a group of islands situated in the Bay of Bengal at about 1,250 km (780 mi) from Kolkata, 1,200 km (750 mi) from Chennai and 190 km (120 mi) from Cape of Nargis in Burma. Until 1938 the British government used them as a penal colony for Indian and African political prisoners, who were mainly put in the notorious Cellular Jail in Port Blair, the biggest town (port) on the islands. Today they form a Union Territory of India.

The only military objective on the islands was the city of Port Blair. The garrison consisted of a 300-man Sikh militia with 23 British officers, augmented in January 1942 by a Gurkha detachment of 4/12th Frontier Force Regiment of the 16th Indian Infantry Brigade. Following the fall of Rangoon on March 8, however, the British recognized that Port Blair had become impossible to defend, and on March 10 the Gurkhas were withdrawn to the Arakan peninsula.

== Japanese occupation ==
Port Blair was occupied on the 23 March 1942. The garrison offered no resistance to the landings, and were disarmed and interned; many of the Sikh militia later enlisted in the Indian National Army. The British militia officers were sent to Singapore as POWs, whilst Chief Commissioner Waterfall, Deputy Commissioner Major A.G. Bird and the other British administrative officers were imprisoned. The Japanese released the prisoners held in the jail, one of whom, Pushkar Bakshi, became their principal collaborator. The islands were put under the authority of Colonel Bucho of the INA, whilst a number of junior Indian officials in the administration were elevated to more responsible posts. The defence of the islands was assigned to the newly formed fighter squadron of the Kanoya Kōkūtai based at Tavoy in southern Burma. This fighter squadron was the former "Yamada Unit" under the control of the 22nd Koku Sentai, then based at Penang. Six flying boats from the Toko Kōkūtai were dispatched on March 26, with twelve more arriving shortly thereafter. Within the islands, a Japanese garrison of approximately 600 men, together with the police force, now under Japanese control, were responsible for maintaining order.

Japanese Army personnel in Andaman and Nicobar

- Yoshisuke Inoue: Commanding Officer 35th Independent Mixed Brigade, Andaman Islands
- Toshio Itsuki: Commanding Officer 36th Independent Mixed Brigade, Nicobar Islands
- Hideo Iwakuro: Japanese Liaison Officer to Indian National Army
- Major-General Saburo Isoda: Japanese Liaison Officer to Indian National Army

=== Japanese atrocities ===
The events of the next three years are not easy to establish, as the Japanese destroyed all records when they left. The principal sources are an unpublished report by local resident Rama Krishna: The Andaman Islands under Japanese Occupation 1942–5, another unpublished account by a British officer, D. McCarthy: The Andaman Interlude (he was sent on a secret mission to the islands in 1944), together with the memories of the older inhabitants interviewed by historians. All these and the published works that draw upon them are in agreement that the occupation saw numerous atrocities committed by the Japanese against the local population.

The first victim of the occupation came on the fourth day after the Japanese landings. Angered by soldiers who had pursued some chickens into his house, a young man called Zulfiqar Ali fired an airgun at them. No one was hurt, but he was forced into hiding. The Japanese went about killing, raping and burning whatever came before them until the time the villagers were forced to produce the boy next morning. After twenty-four hours he was captured and marched to the maidan in front of the Browning Club. Here his arms were twisted until they broke, and he was then shot. A cement memorial now stands on the spot. In the early days of the occupation local intellectuals (mostly officials and doctors) were encouraged to join Rash Behari Bose's Indian Independence League, and a 'Peace Committee' was formed from its members, headed by Diwan Singh.

Over the next few months they did what they could to mitigate the suffering of the population at the hands of the Japanese, but to little avail: indeed, many of them would later fall victim themselves. Diwan Singh was arrested and tortured for 82 days until he died in January 1944. In any case, there was little any of them could have done to save Major A.G. Bird, who had not been sent to Rangoon or Singapore like the other British captives, and of whom the Japanese were determined to make an example. Pushkar Bakshi persuaded a fellow convict, Sarup Ram, to bear witness at Bird's 'trial' that he had been spying (wireless parts had been planted in the house where he was imprisoned). According to eyewitnesses, a popular man known as "Chirrie" ('Bird' in Hindi) had his arms and legs twisted and broken, and was then beheaded by Colonel Bucho with his sword.

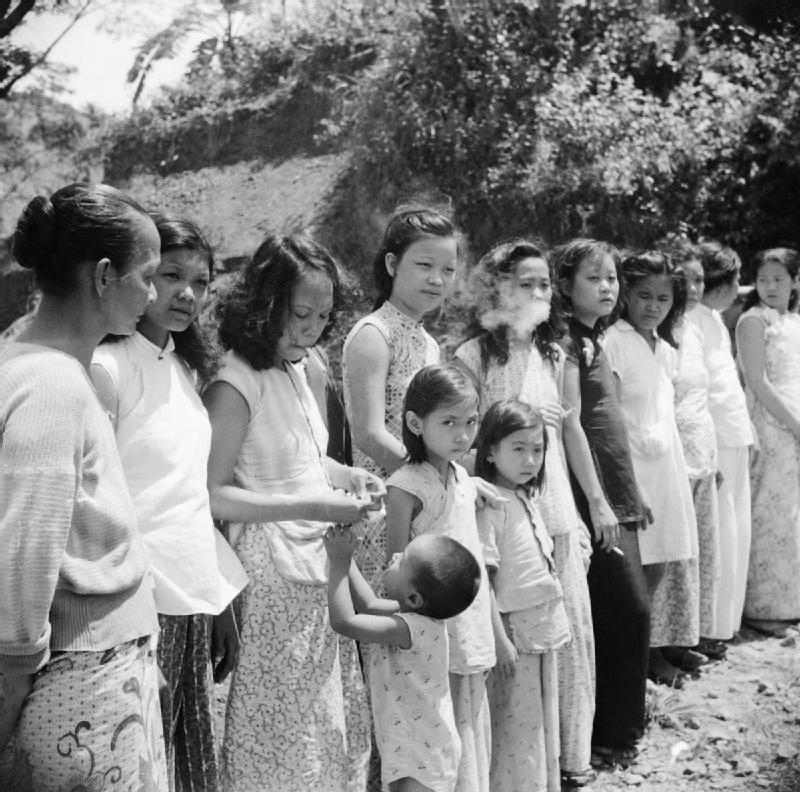
Chinese and Malayan girls forcibly taken from Penang by the Japanese to work as 'comfort girls' for the troops.

Korean and Malay women were brought in to act as "comfort women" for the Japanese garrison, as the local female population was too small to fill this role alone. Forced labour was used to build a new airport, and in October 1942 mass arrests of 'spies' took place, with 300 people being confined in the Cellular Jail, where some were tortured. Of these, seven were shot, including Narayan Rao, who had been Superintendent of Police under Japanese auspices; Itter Singh, the Deputy Superintendent; Subedar Sube Singh of the Military Police and Dr. Surinder Nag. Realising that the Japanese were targeting influential members of the population, the members of the Indian Independence League grew increasingly nervous, and ceased to engage in much nationalist activity.

In 1943 a second reign of terror was unleashed by the new commander of the garrison, Colonel Jochi Renusakai, and chief of police Mitsubashi, both of whom had served at Nanking. 600 people were arrested and tortured, including Dr. Diwan Singh, who died as a result of his injuries. At this stage, the Japanese decided that Bakshi was no longer useful, and he was imprisoned. Around 2000 Indians died due to Japanese brutality during their occupation of the island until October 1945. Subhas Bose clearly earned disrepute among the residents as he did not take steps to inquire about the atrocities, despite the existing infamy of Japanese atrocities in other countries.

== The Provisional Government of Free India ==
On December 29, 1943, political control of the islands was passed to the Azad Hind government of Subhas Chandra Bose. Bose visited Port Blair to raise the tricolour flag of the Indian National Army. During this, his only visit to the Andamans, he was kept carefully screened from the local population by the Japanese authorities. Attempts were made to inform him of the sufferings of the people of the Andamans, and the fact that many local Indian Nationalists were being tortured in the Cellular Jail. Bose does not seem to have been aware of this, and the judgment of some is that he "failed his people". After Bose's departure the Japanese remained in control of the Andamans, and the sovereignty of the Provisional Government of Free India was largely fictional.

The islands were renamed "Shaheed" and "Swaraj", meaning "martyr" and "self-rule" respectively. Bose appointed General A. D. Loganathan as the governor of the islands, and had limited involvement with the administration of the territory. During his interrogation after the war Loganathan admitted that he had only had full control over the islands' vestigial education department, as the Japanese had retained control over the police force, and in protest he had refused to accept responsibility for any other areas of Government. He was powerless to prevent the worst Japanese atrocity of the occupation, the Homfreyganj massacre on 30 January 1944, where 44 Indian civilians were shot by the Japanese on suspicion of spying. Many of them were members of the Indian Independence League. Notionally this government continued to administer the islands, which were almost the only territory it ever acquired, until the British retook them in 1945, but in practice little had changed.

== The last year ==
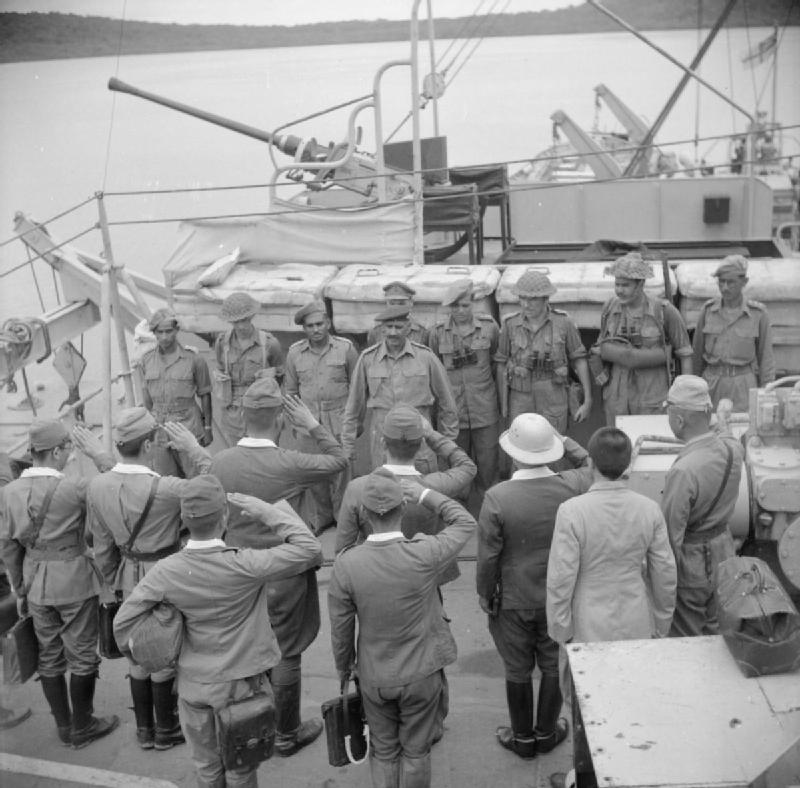
Members of the Japanese military delegation salute Lieutenant Colonel Nathu Singh, commanding officer of the Rajput Regiment, after they arrived on board HMS Rocksand to arrange for the British occupation of the islands.

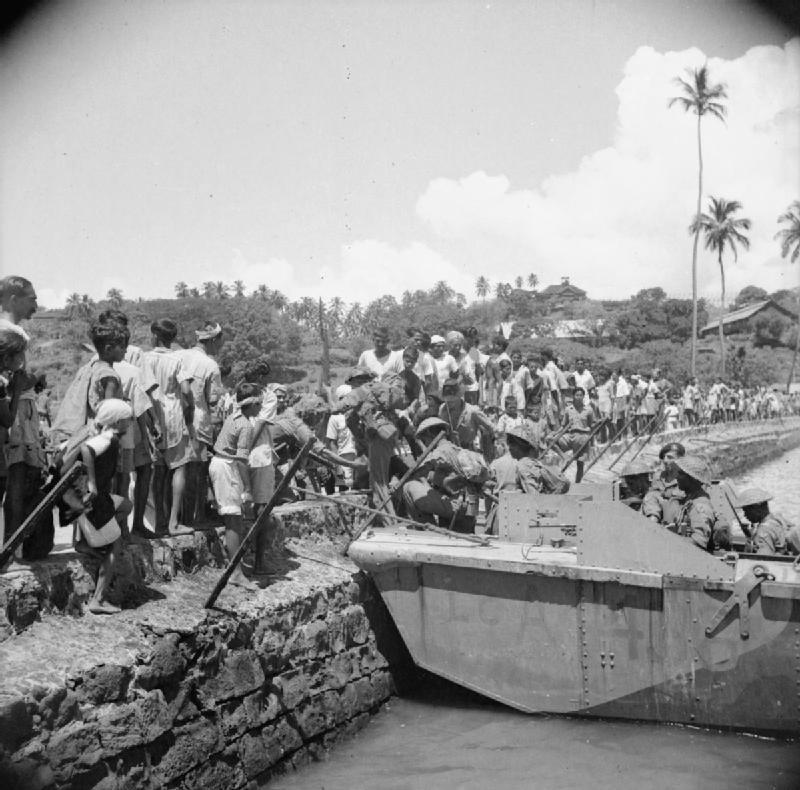
The first members of the Allied forces to land at Port Blair in the Andaman Islands are welcomed by the local population, 1945

As food became more scarce in 1945, the Japanese resorted to ever more desperate measures. Between 250 and 700 people (estimates vary) from the Aberdeen area of South Andaman were deported to an uninhabited island to grow food. According to a survivor, a released convict called Saudagar Ali, at least half drowned or were eaten by sharks as they were pushed out of boats in the dark, whilst the remainder either died of starvation or were killed by Bangladeshi pirates. A rescue mission sent to the island after the end of the occupation found just twelve survivors and over a hundred skeletons on the beach.

In all, approximately 2,000 people in the Andamans are thought to have died as a result of the occupation, and at least 501 were tortured by the Japanese. The former figure represents 10% of the pre-war population of Port Blair. Casualties on the more sparsely populated Nicobar islands were fewer, as the Japanese did not have a garrison there, although in 1943 they created a brief reign of terror on Car Nicobar as they rounded up forced labour amongst the Nicobarese. The occupation left a legacy of lasting bitterness towards the Japanese, and to some extent towards their collaborators in the Provisional Government of Free India, amongst the generation which experienced it.

Japanese Vice Admiral Teizo Hara, and Major-General Tamenori Sato surrendered the islands to Lt Col Nathu Singh Rathore, commanding officer 1/7 Rajput Regiment on 15 August 1945 on board the Royal Navy ship HMS Rocksand; the signing ceremonies were to take place later. This was the only large scale surrender of the Japanese to Indian Forces. A memorial in Port Blair commemorating the Japanese surrender was built thereafter.

== Japanese order of battle ==
The Japanese, seeking to secure their seaward flank, dispatched a force to seize the islands. The force was composed of the following units and ships:

Distant Cover

- Cruiser (flagship) Chokai
Carrier Division 4
- Carrier Ryūjō (although listed, she did not conduct air operations)
Cruiser Division 7 – Heavy cruisers
- Kumano
- Suzuya
- Mikuma
- Mogami
Destroyer Division 11
- Fubuki
- Hatsuyuki
- Shirayuki
- Murakami

Close Cover

Destroyer Squadron 3
- Light cruiser Sendai

Destroyer Division 19
- Isonami
- Uranami
- Ayanami
Destroyer Division 20
- Amagiri
- Asagiri
- Yugiri
- Shirakumo

Invasion Force

- Light cruiser Yura – escort unit
- 9 Transports

- 1 Battalion from 18th Infantry Division
- 9th Base Force

- Training cruiser Kashii
- Escort ship Shimushu
- Minelayer Hatsutaka
- Converted gunboat Eiko Maru

Minesweeper Division 1

- Minesweepers W1, W3, W4

Special Minesweeper Division 91

- Minesweepers: Choko Maru, Shonan Maru No. 7, Shonan Maru #5

Air Unit

- Seaplane tender Sagara Maru (operated east of the Nicobars)

== See also ==
- Battle of the Malacca Strait
- Cocos Islands mutiny
- India in World War II
