= Cart and Cwidder =

British young adult fantasy novel

- First edition
- Author: Diana Wynne Jones
- Cover artist: Juliet Stanwell Smith
- Language: English
- Series: Dalemark Quartet
- Genre: Fantasy, children's novel
- Publisher: Macmillan
- Publication date: 1975
- Publication place: United Kingdom
- Media type: Print (hardback and paperback)
- Pages: 193
- ISBN: 0-333-17939-0
- Followed by: Drowned Ammet

Cart and Cwidder is a fantasy novel for young adults by the British author Diana Wynne Jones. It is the first book published in the Dalemark Quartet, although chronologically it is the third in the series, coming in time hundreds of years after The Spellcoats and a year or so after Drowned Ammet.

== Plot summary ==
Osfameron Tanamoril (Moril) Clennenson is a travelling musician, who travels with his father, Clennen, his mother, Lenina, and his elder siblings, Dagner and Brid, through Dalemark, a country torn by civil war between the South and the North. They travel around, playing music, taking passengers and messages, and spreading news throughout the country.

When Clennen (the father and main performer) is murdered by the Earl of South Dales, who suspects him of being a spy for the North, Lenina (who is high-born and gave up the chance of being a Lady when she married Clennen) takes her three children and their passenger Kialan, the fugitive son of a Northern earl, back to her home town of Markind in South Dalemark. Within the same day as her husband's death, Lenina is married to her former fiancé the Lord of Markind, guided by the belief that this is the only way to counter the bad luck caused by Clennen's murder.

Dagner, Brid, and Moril encounter their father's murderer among the wedding guests in Markind and together with Kialan they flee the town and try to reach the North, while continuing to perform for a living, but without Clennen and Lenina, they find this difficult to do. The oldest son, Dagner, tries to continue their father's work as a Northern spy, but is arrested for treason against the Earl of South Dales. Brid, Moril, and Kialan are forced to flee, believing that Dagner will be hanged.

Before he died, Clennen left his youngest son Moril a magical cwidder (a common musical instrument in Dalemark similar to a lute with some properties of an acoustic guitar). It is rumoured to have been owned by Moril's ancestor and namesake Osfameron, who was both a minstrel and a famous magician, featuring in many of the legends of Dalemark. Throughout their travels from the South to the North, Moril discovers that he has the power to use the magic of his newly inherited instrument.

As they travel, they become embroiled in the civil war. As the Southerners are about to attack the North, Moril uses his magical cwidder to make the mountains 'walk' and close Flennpass, the only mountain pass between the North and the South, just as his ancestor, the famed Osfameron, did in so many of the songs Moril's father had sung nearly every day. The walking mountains crush the attacking Southern army, killing the evil Earl of South Dales, Clennen's murderer, and saving the North. After the battle, however, Moril is wracked with guilt, as he caused the deaths of hundreds of men, and mainly because he was angry that his beloved horse, Olob, had been shot.

In the end, when all safely reach Hannart, the earldom of Kialan's father, they are joined by Dagner who has been released from jail after the death of the Earl of South Dales and travelled to North Dalemark with another travelling Singer, Hestefan. Moril decides that he should travel with Hestefan and learn how to be a proper Singer. Hestefan accepts, and they leave to continue travelling through Dalemark.

== Characters ==
- Moril (full name Osfameron Tanamoril) is the youngest son of Clennen and Lenina, who inherited his father's magic cwidder and learned to use its powers with dramatic results.
- Clennen Mendakersson is one of the most famous Singers in Dalemark and a composer of many songs with which he travelled through both North and South. In secret, he is the Porter, the notorious Northern spy wanted by the South Earls, using his status as a Singer to allow him to travel freely around the country.
- Kialan (Collen or Halain in Southern pronunciation) is the 14-year-old son of the Earl of Hannart of North Dale, shipwrecked on the coast of Holand in the South and now trying to escape a certain death by hanging in the hands of the Southern earls. He joins Clennen's band as a fugitive travelling to the North.
- Dagner (full name Dastgandlen Handagner) is the eldest son of Clennen and Lenina, a promising composer. After Clennen's murder, he tries to pass sensitive information to Southern freedom-fighters, but is arrested and threatened with execution. He is released when Tholian, the Earl of South Dales, is killed with all his male relatives by the "walking mountains" in Fennpass and, as Tholian's second cousin, becomes nominally the heir to the earldom of South Dales.
- Brid (full name Cennoreth Manaliabrid) is the daughter of Clennen and Lenina, a singer and panhorn player performing with her parents and two brothers from a garishly painted pink cart, travelling from the South to the North.
- Lenina Thornsdaughter is the niece of Earl Tholian of South Dales, wife of Clennen the Singer, and mother of Dagner, Brid, and Moril. Brought up as an aristocrat in the Southern earldom of Neathdale, she became bethrothed to Ganner Sargesson, but at their betrothal feast, she met Clennen, fell in love with him, ran away with him, and eventually married him.
- Tholian is the evil Earl of South Dales who murders Clennen and amasses an army to attack the North. He is killed by the "walking mountains" that block Flennpass in response to the magic music from Moril's cwidder.
- Ganner Sagersson is the Lord of Markind (a vassal of the Earl of South Dales), a former fiancé of Lenina who lost her to Clennen's magic in a singing performance and finally marries her after Clennen's death. The Glossary included at the end of the tetralogy's final volume, The Crown of Dalemark, includes about a half-dozen entries which are simply insulting nicknames for Ganner.
- Olob (full name Barangarolob) is the faithful horse that pulled Clennen the Singer's cart in all the travels. Olob had a special sense that made him whinny and misbehave when enemies were near. Olob was killed by a stray Southern bullet in the attack on Fennpass, and this event energised Moril into magic-making on his cwidder.

== Explanation of the novel's title ==
The novel's title refers to the cart in which Singers travel around South and North Dalemark and the cwidder, a lute-like string instrument played by Singers as an accompaniment to their songs and stories.
