= Azad Hind stamps =

The Azad Hind stamps are a set of prepared but never issued stamps for the planned Provisional Government of Free India under Subhas Chandra Bose. All stamps were printed by photogravure in sheets of 100 at the Reichsdruckerei, the Government Printing Bureau in Berlin.

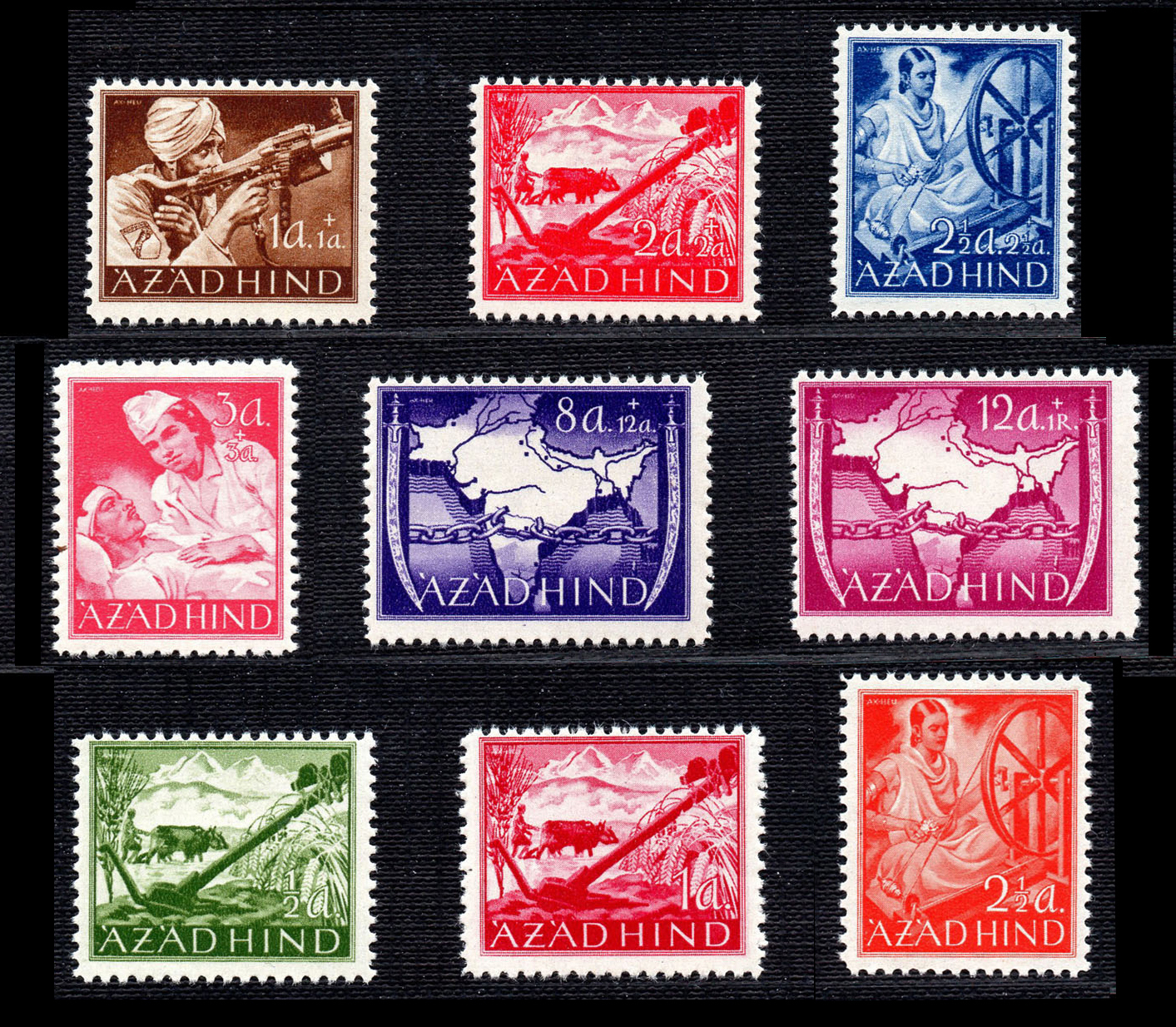
The smaller nominal values of the Azad Hind stamps. The lower three stamps without surcharge were planned for the Andaman and Nicobar Islands

== Background ==
The "Provisional Government of Free India" was founded by Subhas Chandra Bose as a government in exile with the support of Japan during the Second World War. For this government, stamps were planned, which were manufactured in Nazi Germany. The stamps were commissioned by Bose himself during his stay in Berlin in early 1943.

== The stamps ==
A total of ten different stamps were produced:

Michel No.	Stamp	Nominal value	Colour	Description
I		1+1 Anna	Dark brown	Sikh with a German MG 34 machine gun
II		2+2 Annas	Crimson	Ploughing farmer in front of a mountainous landscape. In front of it a plough and sheaves
III		2½+2½ Annas	Dark blue	Indian woman at a spinning wheel
IV		3+3 Annas	Red	Nurse with a wounded man
V	rand	8+12 Annas	Blue-violet	Broken chain and daggers in front of a map of British India
VI		12 Annas + 1 Rupee	Lilac purpur	Broken chain and daggers in front of a map of British India
VIII		½ Anna	Dark yellow-green	For the Andaman and Nicobar Islands without surcharge: Ploughing farmer in front of a mountainous landscape. In front of it a plough and sheaves
IX		1 Anna	Lilac red	For the Andaman and Nicobar Islands without surcharge: Ploughing farmer in front of a mountainous landscape. In front of it a plough and sheaves
X	rand	2½ Annas	Orange red	For the Andaman and Nicobar Islands without surcharge: Indian woman at a spinning wheel
VII a		1+2 Rupees	Black/Orange/Emerald green	Three Indian soldiers flying the flag of "Free India", framed by two daggers. There are variants in black and black/orange as well as proofs

The stamps were designed by the graphic artist couple Werner and Maria von Axster-Heudtlaß, who designed numerous stamps for the Reichspost and later for the Deutsche Post between 1925 and 1949. According to propaganda philately specialist Dave Ripley, the soldiers on the 1+2 rupees stamp represent three of India's best-known freedom fighters at the time (from left): Sukhdev Thapar, Bhagat Singh as standard-bearer and Shivaram Rajguru. They were hanged by the British authorities on March 23, 1931. 1 million copies of each stamp were printed. Exceptions were those planned for the Andaman and Nicobar Islands without surcharge, which were only issued 500,000 times. A very small number were produced of the higher values 1+2 rupees, which exist in three different varieties. Due to the fact that this value was manufactured in a multicolour print, unfinished variants were discovered later. At the end the flag should be illustrated in orange, white and green colours. Unfinished prints in black and black/orange have been preserved. Of the black version the found quantity was 4500 pieces, of the black-orange 2000 pieces and of the final, finished version 7000 pieces. Except for the higher rupees values (only imperforated), all stamps exist both perforated and in practically the same number imperforated. The stamps planned for the Andaman and Nicobar Islands were perforated L 10½. All other small nominal values were perforated differently, so there were issues with the following variants: L 9½:10½, 10½, 10½:9½ and 11:10½. There are often stamps with irregular perforations.

A large part of the 1+2 rupees stamp in black/orange exists only without gum. Of the 1+2 rupees stamp, very rare proofs have survived, including two sheets of proofs with dark purple instead of black tones and one sheet of proofs on cardboard paper with brightener. This cardboard was provided with advertising on its reverse side. Moreover there exist proofs that were made on paper dyed orange on the front side. There are rupee stamps on which the colours appear blurred or have been printed in the wrong place (sometimes twice). There is a conspicuous plate error of the 3+3 annas stamp, which partly has a larger white, round spot left of the nurse's head.

1+2 rupees stamps (inclusive proofs)

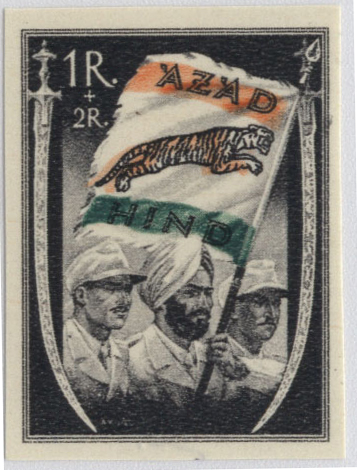
1+2 rupees black/orange/green (VII a)

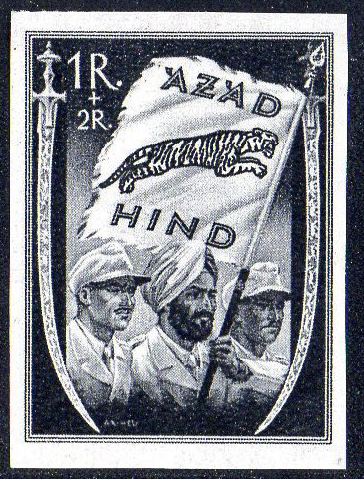
1+2 rupees black
(VII b)

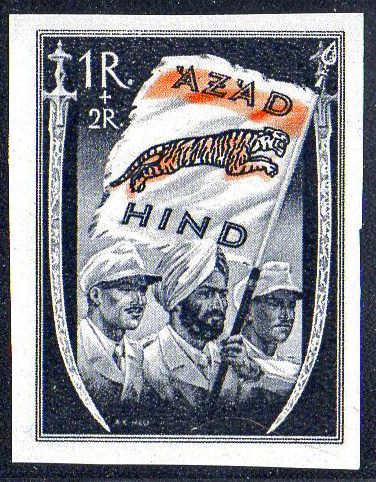
1+2 rupees black/orange (VII c)

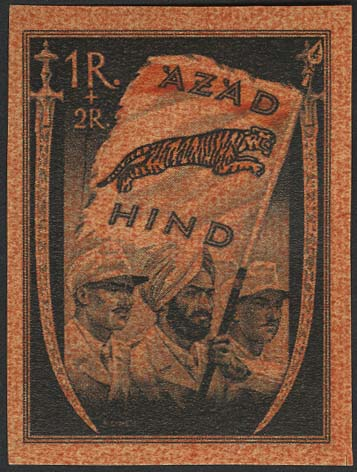
Proof on orange coloured paper

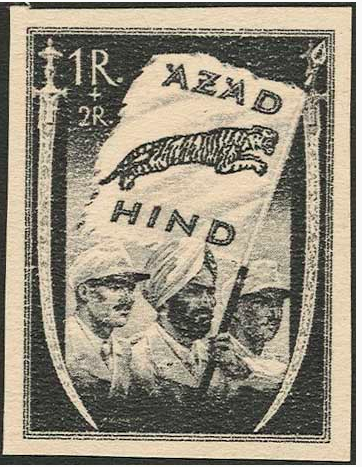
Proof on cardboard paper with optical brightener

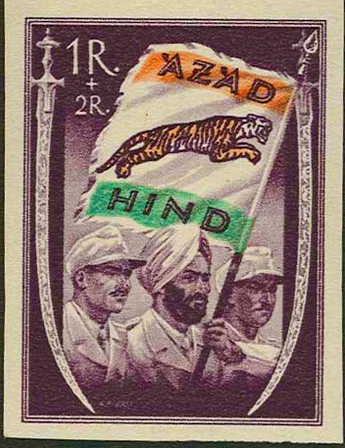
Proof with dark purple tones
Varieties and special features

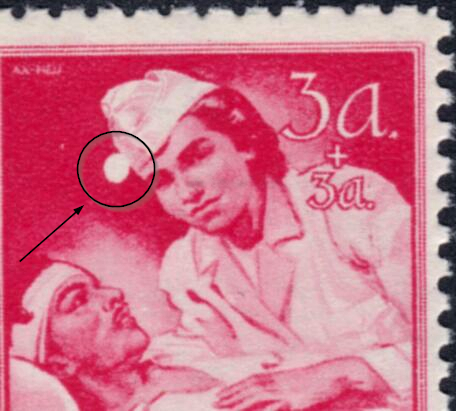
3+3 annas stamp with a striking plate error

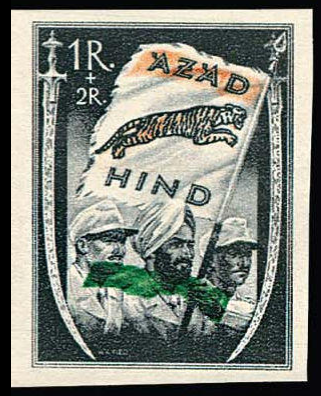
Genuine 1+2 rupees stamp with shifted green colour

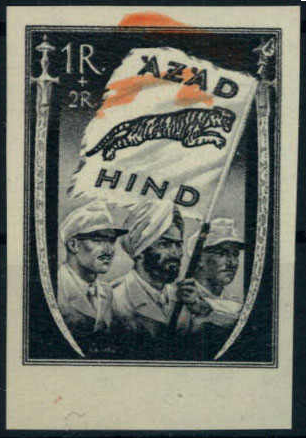
Genuine 1+2 rupees stamp with shifted orange colour

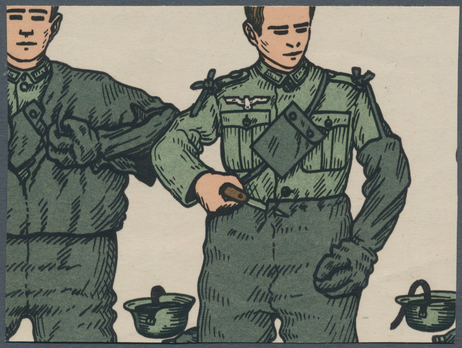
Reverse side of the proof on cardboard paper

== Cataloguing and publications ==
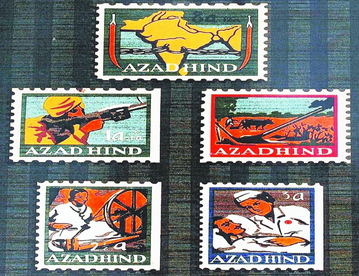
A "modern" design of Azad Hind stamps in a publication of the Netaji Birth Place Museum (India)

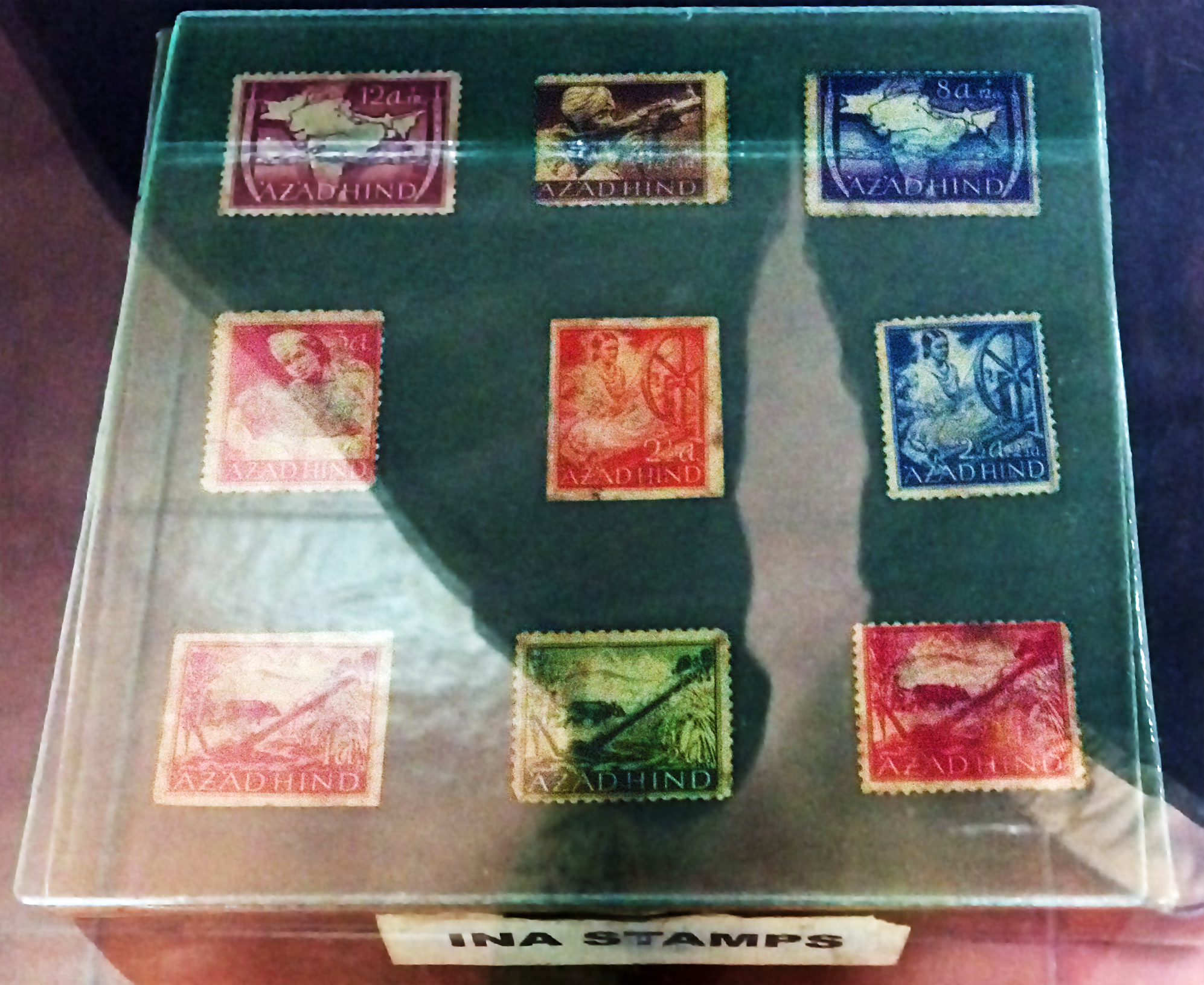
Azad Hind stamps exhibited at the Netaji Birth Place Museum (India)

The stamps of Azad Hind are listed in the Michel Germany catalogue under "Nationales Indien" ("National India") and bear the designations I to X ( perforated and imperforated). Of No. VII (1+2 rupees) the varieties a, b and c are named.

The Indian Post has published the Azad-Hind stamps in a book entitled India's Freedom Struggle through India Postage Stamps.

In 2016, the Netaji Birth Place Museum in Cuttack (India) published a brochure in which, among other things, the Azad Hind stamps were shown in "free interpretation". Original stamps are also displayed in the visitor rooms.

== Forgeries ==
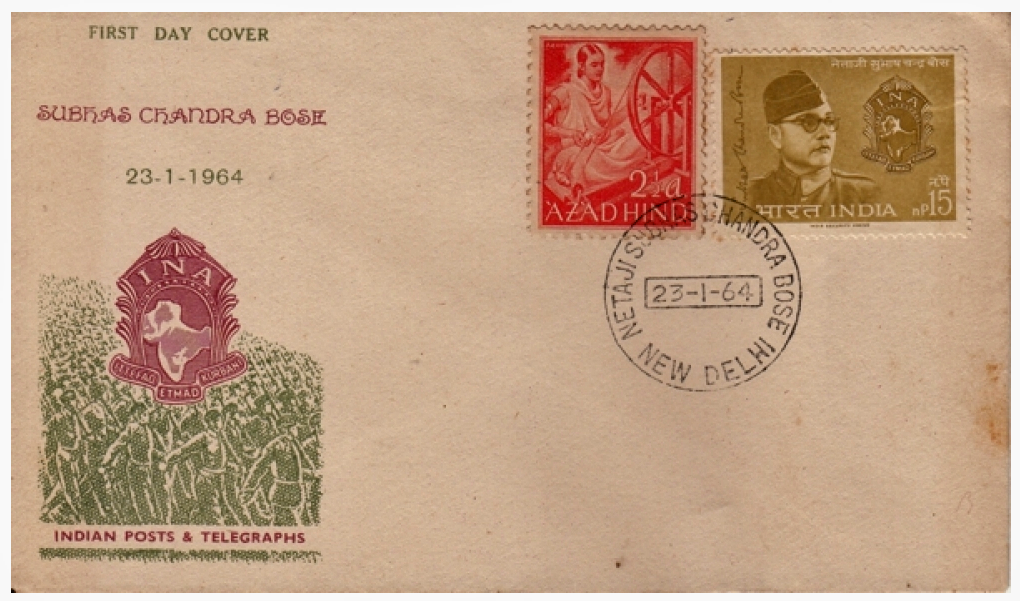
First day cover of the Indian Post with an added and then cancelled Azad Hind stamp

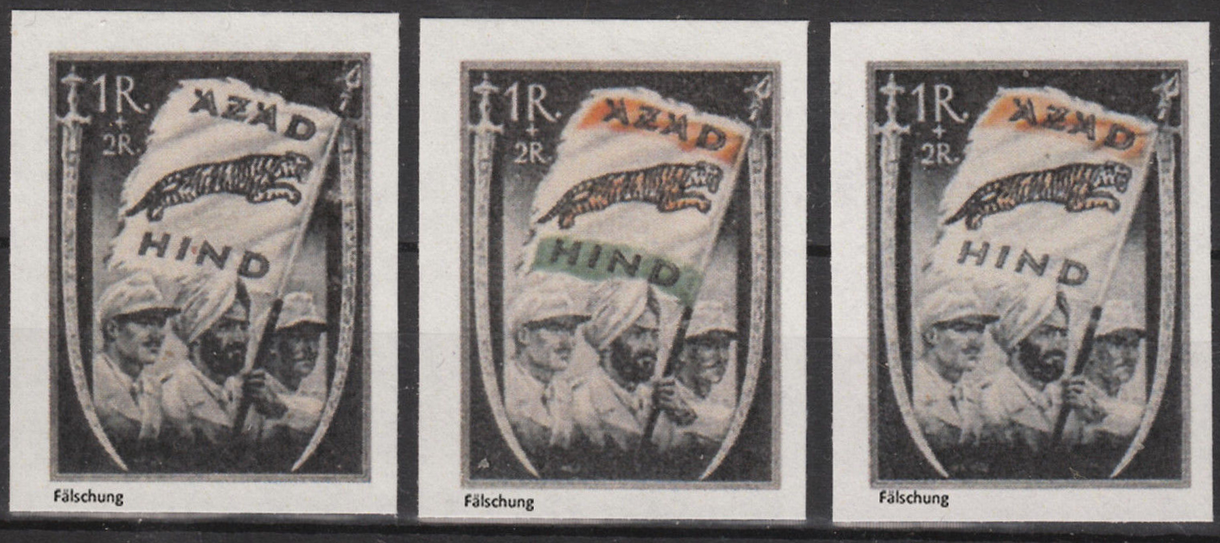
Faked 1+2 rupees stamps

As the market value of the 1+2 rupees stamps has increased considerably over the years due to their rarity, forgeries are produced. These can usually be recognized by an unclear and washed-out looking print, as they are often produced using offset printing instead of photogravure. There are also imitations that are produced with inkjet printers.

As the stamps have not been issued, it is not possible that they exist with a real cancellation. In 1964 Subhas Chandra Bose was honoured in India by the Indian Post with two stamps. On this occasion first day covers with Bose stamps were also published. On some of these letters, as a "mixed franking", Azad Hind stamps were additionally attached and then cancelled. Also cancellations of exclusively used Azad Hind stamps on first day covers are known. The same was done with Indian first day covers from 1968.

== See also ==
- Azad Hind
- Indian National Army
- Cinderella stamps

== Sources ==
- Michel Deutschland-Spezial 2018. Schwaneberger Verlag GmbH, München 2018.
- Indian Legion Stamps and Postal History in Introduction to Foreign Legion Stamps and Postal History.
