= The Spellcoats =

1979 novel by Diana Wynne Jones

- First edition
- Author: Diana Wynne Jones
- Cover artist: Pamela Goodchild
- Language: English
- Series: Dalemark Quartet
- Genre: Children's, fantasy novel
- Publisher: Macmillan
- Publication date: 12 April 1979
- Publication place: United Kingdom
- Media type: Print (hardback and paperback)
- Pages: 256 pp
- ISBN: 0-333-25351-5
- OCLC: 59056937
- Preceded by: Drowned Ammet
- Followed by: The Crown of Dalemark

The Spellcoats (1979) is the third published novel in Diana Wynne Jones's series Dalemark Quartet, but chronologically the first. The story takes place several thousand years before Cart and Cwidder and Drowned Ammet. The time period is referred to as "prehistoric Dalemark" because by the time of the other books, only legends remain from this time. The people of prehistoric Dalemark do not have a written language, but some know how to write by weaving in a language of runes using yarn of many colours and textures.

== Plot ==
Tanaqui is a young woman. She resides in a small town called Shelling. She and four siblings look different from the rest of the townsfolk. Their family has three idols—the so-called Undying. The country is invaded by Heathens. They are the ancestors of the people of Dalemark in the other three novels. Tanaqui and her siblings flee to avoid being killed by the people of their own village; they physically resemble Heathens.

The Spellcoats is not a diary, nor is it "told" as many stories are, but is a woven. Tanaqui weaves a story into a "spellcoat" that she weaves.

The first spellcoat tells of how the five siblings (Gull, Robin, Hern, Tanaqui and Duck) traveled downriver on their boat. First, they encounter the mysterious magician Tanamil, then the Heathen king Kars Adon, and finally, at the sea, the evil mage Kankredin, whose aim is to take over the power of the river by taking over the five children's souls.

The second spellcoat tells how they escape from Kankredin, but then the five siblings are captured by their own King, "the king of the natives". This king has lost his kingdom. He is bivouacking with the remains of his army trying to avoid the Heathens. The King confines the children because he needs one of the children's idols to assist him. Tanaqui continues to weave during her confinement with the King, and she realizes that the spellcoats that mages wore gave them powers that were woven into their spellcoats. This convinced her that the words woven into spellcoats will have the power to defeat Kankredin.

Realizing that Tanaqui is the only one able to stop Kankredin and his mages with her weaving, her elder brother Hern convinces the combined forces of their own people and the Heathens to take a stand, and hold off Kankredin while Tanaqui completes the second spellcoat. Tanaqui weaves frantically and finally she completes her spellcoat with a waking vision she experiences.

In an epilogue written by Elthorar Ansdaughter, Keeper of Antiquities, it is stated that the spellcoats were discovered hundreds of years later, during the approximate time period of Drowned Ammet and Cart and Cwidder, in the mountains of North Dalemark near Hannart. Elthorar notes the close correspondence between various figures in the stories and their apparent counterparts in the legends and folktales of the people of Dalemark.

Like the other three novels of the Dalemark Quartet, The Spellcoats is a story about a physical journey, during which revelations occur. As in the other three books, the presence of magic is not readily apparent at its beginning, but slowly creeps into the story.

== Characters ==
=== Closti's children ===
The five sons and daughters of Closti the Clam are born and raised in the village of Shelling across the River. Although their father never left Shelling, his children look like the heathens with their blond hair.

- Gull is the second eldest of Closti the Clam's five children. He goes off to war with his father, but is the only one to return. When he comes home from war, his mind has deteriorated and his siblings must look after him. In actuality, he isn't crazy, but caught in a spell by the mage Kankredin, who wants to use Gull's soul to reach the One.
- Robin is Tanaqui's sister, eldest of the five. She falls in love with Tanamil, but is married against her will to the King. This puts her younger brother Hern in a straight line of succession to the King.
- Hern is Tanaqui's older brother. Hern is extremely "reasonable" and resists admitting that magic exists. He becomes great friends with Kars Adon, who names Hern his heir, and he inherits the crowns of both the heathens and the native people when their two kings are killed simultaneously in an act of treachery. He thus becomes King Hern, the first recorded king of Dalemark who is mentioned repeatedly in other volumes of the Dalemark Quartet.
- Tanaqui is the narrator, whose name means "rushes" if woven as one word and "younger sister" if woven as two (tan and aqui). She is the weaver and eventually one of the Undying, the witch Cennoreth who appears in The Crown of Dalemark.
- Mallard is called by his nickname "Duck" and is the youngest of the five siblings. Coached by Tanamil, he becomes a mage. Like Tanaqui, he is Undying and appears in The Crown of Dalemark.

=== Heathens ===
Heathens are blonde, bushy-haired, dark-skinned foreigners who invade Dalemark.

- Kars Adon is the crippled young king of the heathens. He and Hern strike up a friendship built upon deep, mutual respect. Upon his death, Kars Adon bequeaths his kingdom to Tanaqui's elder brother Hern.
- Kankredin is a powerful evil mage, intent on conquering prehistoric Dalemark; he reappears and is ultimately destroyed in The Crown of Dalemark.

=== Riverlands natives ===
Natives of prehistoric Dalemark.

- Closti the Clam is the father of Gull, Robin, Hern, Tanaqui, and Mallard by Anoreth the Undying.
- King of the Riverlands: Aside from the nickname of "Old Smiler" given to him by Duck, the King's name is not mentioned, although he plays a major role in the second spellcoat. The King turns the peacemaking parley initiated by Kars Adon into an act of treachery, in which both Kars and the King are killed.

=== Undying ===
Undying are strange, immortal beings with mysterious powers. Humans see them as gods, but they claim they are not.

- Tanamil is a strange mage whom the family meets on their way downriver and who takes an active part in subsequent the events that lead to the defeat of Kankredin at the source of the River. His name means "younger brother" and he embodies the Red River.
- Anoreth is the daughter of the One and the embodiment of the River itself. The One was against Anoreth's marriage with Closti, and in his anger he forbids her from seeing her family. Her name means "unbound".
- The One, whose three secret names (Adon, Amil, and Oreth) are not to be spoken, is the greatest of the three Undying in Tanaqui's family. Many years ago he was tricked by the Cenblith, who took him as her lover and bound him to the will of mortals. Tanaqui's spellcoats free him to defeat Kankredin at the source of the River. He is the embodiment of Dalemark itself.

== Recurring themes ==
- Travel is a major theme in many Diana Wynne Jones books. Transformation through travel is particularly notable in her Dalemark books.
- As in Drowned Ammet and The Crown of Dalemark (books 2 and 4 of Dalemark Quartet), the Undying, powerful god-like immortal beings, are active in shaping the fate of Dalemark.
- Siblings: Diana Wynne Jones books, in a reflection of her own youth, often have siblings who, despite personality differences, work together to overcome their problems, such as in Power of Three, Cart and Cwidder, Black Maria, Dark Lord of Derkholm, The Time of the Ghost and The Ogre Downstairs.

== Reception ==
Greg Costikyan reviewed The Spell-Coats in Ares magazine #8 and commented that "as a whole, The Spell-Coats is sufficiently good to warrant place on my Hugo Nomination ballot, and should help establish Jones' credentials as an excellent writer".

== Reviews ==
- Review by Chris Gilmore (1993) in Interzone #78, December 1993
