= Second War of Independence =

Second War of Independence may refer to:

- War of 1812
- Second Italian War of Independence
- Second War of Scottish Independence

== See also ==
- War of Independence (disambiguation)
- First War of Independence (disambiguation)
- Second Battle of Independence (1864; American Civil War)
