= A. D. Loganathan =

Indian National Army officer

Arcot Doraiswamy Loganadan
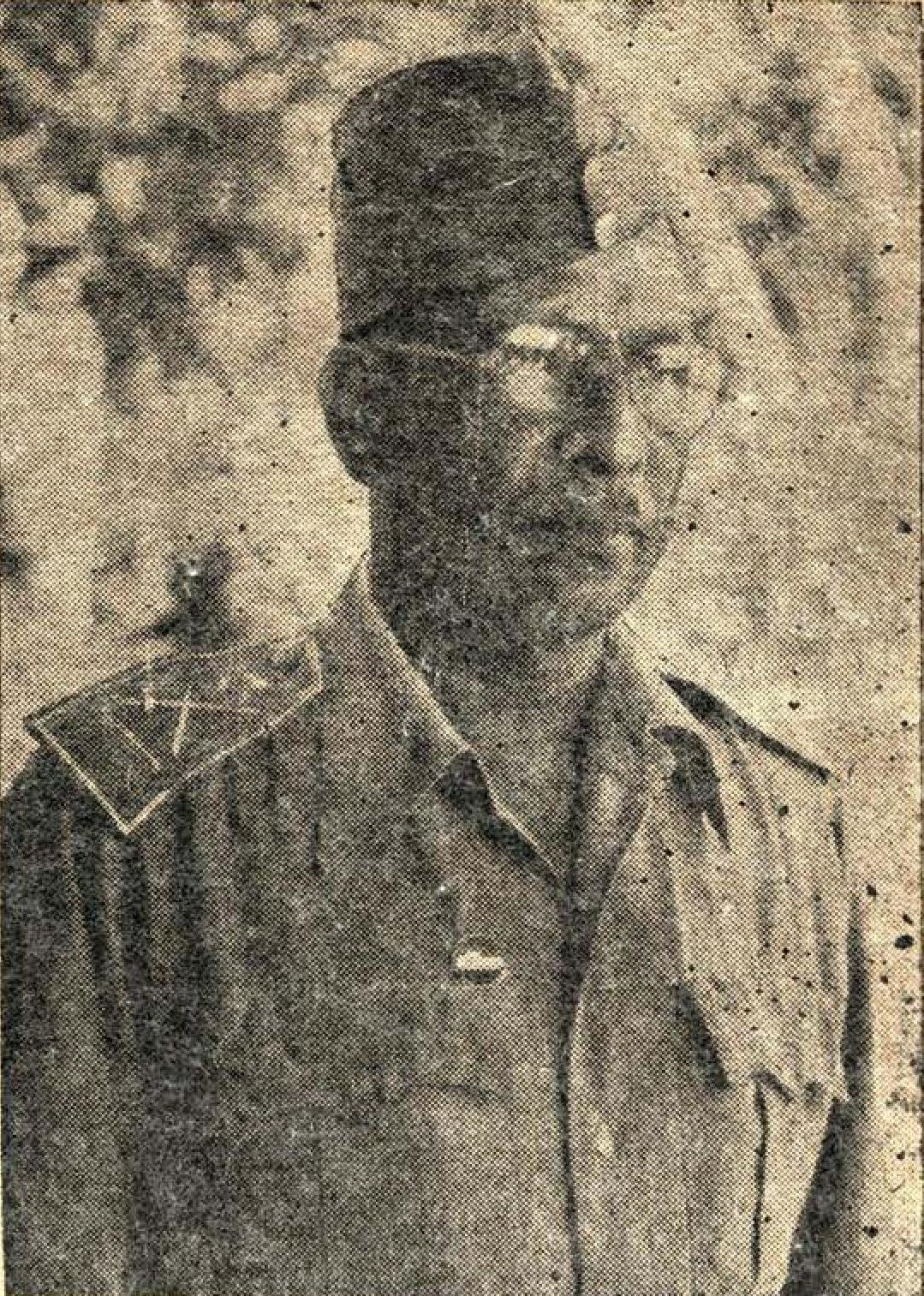

Governor of Andaman and Nicobar Islands
- In office 30 December 1943 - 18 August 1945
- Prime Minister: Subhas Chandra Bose (Head of State and Prime Minister)

Personal details
- Born: 12 April 1888
- Died: 9 March 1949 (aged 60)
- Relations: Saroja (m. 1919)

Military service
- Allegiance: United Kingdom; Azad Hind
- Branch/service: Indian National Army (World War II)
- Rank: Major General (World War II)
- Battles/wars: World War I World War II

Major General Arcot Doraiswamy Loganadan (also spelled as 'Loganathan' in some historical references) (12 April 1888 – 9 March 1949) was an officer of the Indian National Army (which army was allied with the Japanese Empire against British India during World War II), and was also a minister in the Azad Hind Government (another provisional ally of the Japanese Empire during World War II) as a representative of the Indian National Army there. Loganadan also served briefly as the Governor of the Andaman Islands while these islands were occupied by the Japanese during the war, and afterwards moved to Burma for the duration of the war.

Loganadan attended the Central College of Bangalore before enrolling as a student of medicine in the Madras Medical College and later training in London as a doctor of tropical diseases.

== History ==
Loganathan received a temporary commission as a lieutenant into the Indian Medical Service on 27 August 1917, and was later promoted temporary Captain. He was appointed to a regular commission in the Indian Medical Service 1 March 1922. He was promoted Major 27 February 1929. Loganadan served during World War I.

By April 1940 he had been promoted Lieut-Col 15 December 1939.

During World War II, Loganadan joined the Indian National Army following the fall of Singapore and joined the Azad Hind Government under Subhas Chandra Bose to free India from British rule. He was also appointed the Governor of the Andamans and Nicobar Islands during its brief occupation during World War II when it was transferred to Azad Hind authority from the Japanese Navy.

Bad health and severe differences with the Japanese Forces of Occupation led ultimately to Loganadan relinquishing authority and returning to Burma. Later, towards the end of the successful Allied Burma Campaign, Loganadan was appointed the G.O.C(General officer commanding) of the Indian National Army's Burma Command as the Azad Hind Government withdrew from Rangoon. Without a regular police force or security forces, his troops, an INA Contingent 6,000 strong, formally surrendered to released British PoWs held in the city and manned the Burmese Capital, successfully maintaining law and order between 24 April and 4 May 1945.

Loganadan was later repatriated to India and held at the Red Fort as preparations for were made to try the men of the Indian National Army for treason. He returned to his family in Bangalore in 1946 after the completion of the trials and his acquittal. He was however removed from the Indian Army as a Lt-Col, IMS in the London Gazette 20 September 1946. He declined a diplomatic assignment to New Zealand under the Nehru Government because of failing health.

== Family ==
Loganadan was married to Saroja Loganadan, with whom he had five children - Sampath Loganadan, Lalitha Loganadan, Sukumar Loganadan, Menaka Loganadan and Coomalatha Loganadan (m. C. D. Gopinath).

== Legacy ==
Bangalore's Edward Road was renamed Major General A D Loganadan Road by then Chief Minister S. M. Krishna, in honour of the former's life and work. This was the road on which the Loganadan residence once stood, until it gave way to a building called Cunningham Apartments in the 1980s.

== See also ==
- Operation Dracula
