= Homfreyganj massacre =

1944 massacre of Indians by Japan

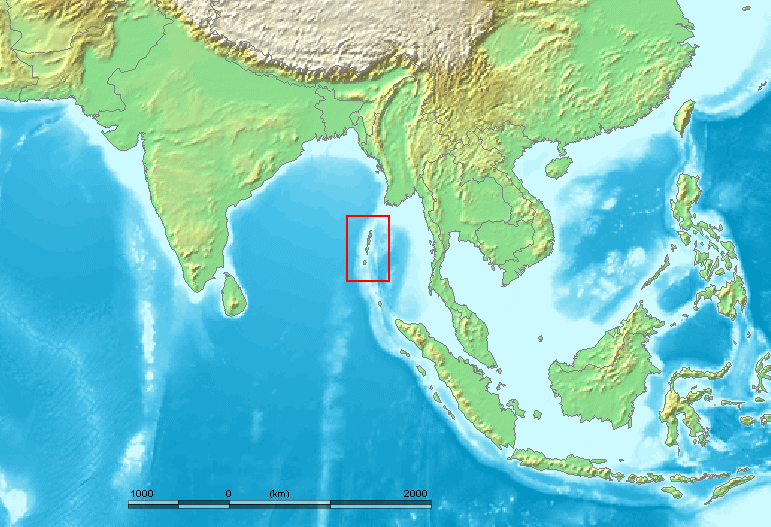
- Location of the Andaman Islands
- Location: 11°40′48″N 92°46′12″E
- Date: 30 January 1944
- Attack type: mass murder, massacre
- Deaths: 44 Indian civilians
- Perpetrator: Imperial Japanese Army

The Homfreyganj massacre was a massacre of suspected spies during World War II in the occupied Andaman Islands.

On January 30, 1944, 44 Indian civilians, suspected of spying, were put to death by the Japanese. They were all shot dead at point-blank range. The majority of the victims were members of the Indian Independence League.

At the time of the massacre, the Andaman Islands were technically under Azad Hind control, although in fact, the Japanese were very much in charge. Despite the lack of practical authority, the Azad Hind government was often accused of "failing its people".

== Background ==
The Andaman Islands, although part of British India, were occupied by the Japanese without resistance. The Japanese maintained a hefty garrison on the islands until the end of World War II. They wanted to use the Andaman Islands as a strategic outpost on the eastern edge of the Indian Ocean, and use it as a naval base. The Japanese wanted to prevent the British from using the islands as a naval and air base to attack the maritime supply line between Singapore and Rangoon (now known as Yangon). They also intended to use the islands to establish a seaplane base to patrol the Bay of Bengal. The British also saw the islands to have military value, especially because they could launch both air raids and invasions against Burma and Malaya (both occupied by Japan). This led to close interest and naval attacks.

== Japanese invasion ==
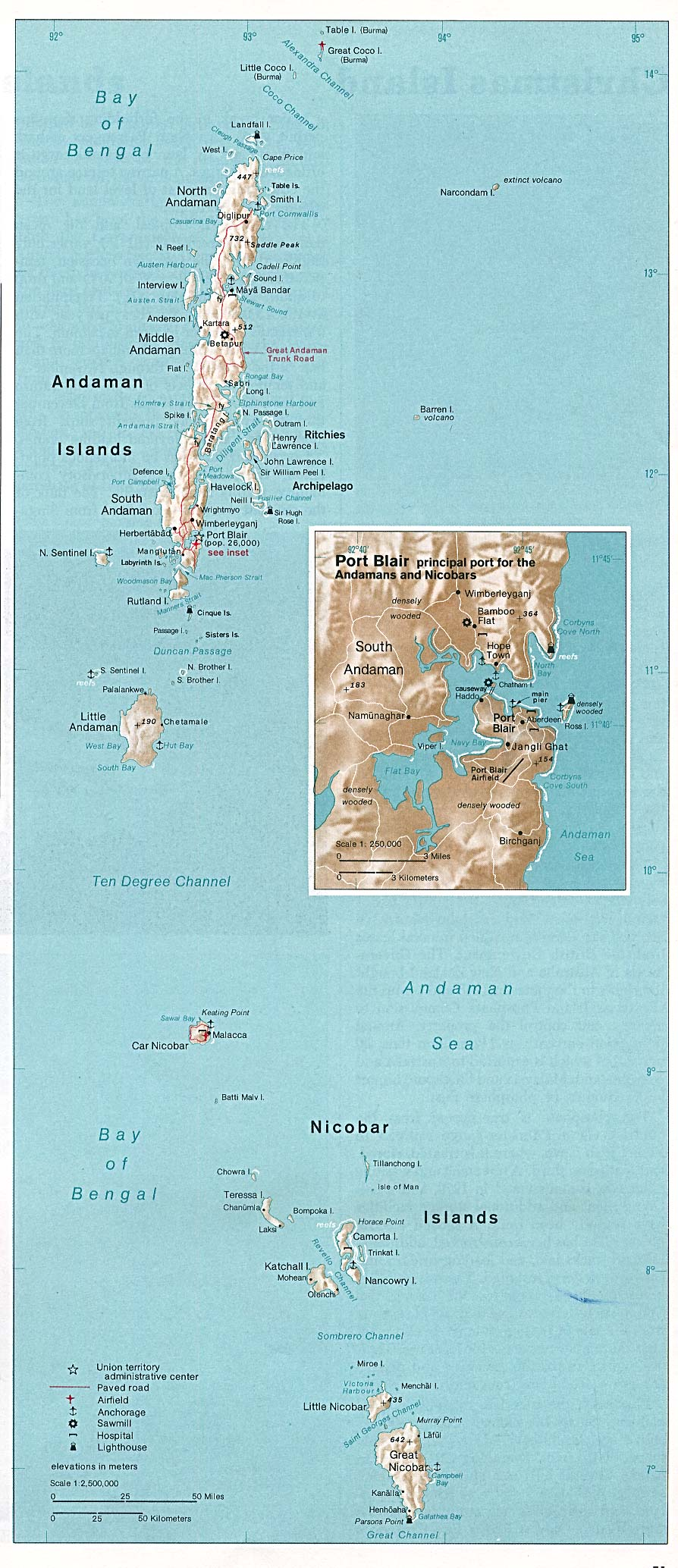
Map of the Andaman and Nicobar Islands

By early 1942, the islands had a population of about 40,000, of which 3,000–5,000 were indigenous people, and the rest being several hundred Europeans, and Indians. Previously, the Japanese had overwhelming success in Malaya and Singapore. This led to a reappraisal of the defense of the Andaman Islands and the people. It was decided that the islands were indefensible. On 10 March 1942, Indian Hindu priests, British women, and British children were evacuated. Led by Captain Kawasaki Harumi, the Japanese quickly dispatched an invasion force coming from Penang. They arrived at Port Blair on 23 March 1942. The invaders landed at Ross Island and Port Blair; detachments were also sent to other populated areas of the islands, like Port Cornwallis. Even though there was no resistance to the invaders, the Japanese were ruthless. They arrested eight senior officials in Port Blair and forced them to dig pits up until only their heads would show. Once they were done, they were stabbed and shot. In another atrocity, an Englishman was publicly beheaded because he communicated with one of his clerks upon being arrested. Other British officials and officers were detained and shipped to Singapore, where they spent the rest of the war in Changi or Sime Road jails. The Japanese also used many local women as comfort girls. Until August 1945, as many as 30,000 out of 40,000 of the population were killed.

== Japanese occupation ==
The Japanese set up a seaplane base at Port Blair, and land forces grouped around Port Blair and Ross Island. They often went on patrols looking for enemies in small motorboats but their noisy vehicles often made their presence clear. There were also many aircraft searches but no British activity was ever spotted. The Japanese wanted to make political capital from their occupation by appearing to transfer the administration of the Andaman Islands to the Indian Independence Movement (Azad Hind) but the Japanese retained all their power. The Indian leader Subhas Chandra Bose visited Port Blair in 1943 and the islands were given governors appointed by him, as well as new names but no authority was handed over to Azad Hind by the Japanese Navy. During his trip, the Japanese were still arresting and torturing members of Azad Hind. After Bose had left, on 30 January 1944, 44 Indians, the majority of them being part of the Indian Independence League, were accused of spying and shot in what was known as the Homfreyganj Massacre.The Japanese took the care of it in such a way that he never came to know about this massacre.

== Aftermath ==
The worst atrocities were saved for last. Food became increasingly scarce, so the Japanese decided to get rid of the old and unemployable. On 13 August 1945, 300 Indians were loaded onto 3 boats which were taken to an uninhabited island. When the boats were several hundred yards from the beach, they were forced to jump into the ocean. About ⅓ of them drowned, and the ones who made it ashore starved to death. Only 11 were alive when British rescuers arrived 6 weeks later. The following day 800 civilians were taken to another uninhabited island where they were left on the beach. 19 Japanese troops came ashore and shot or bayoneted every last one of them. Later, troops came to burn and bury all the dead bodies.
