= First War of Independence =

First War of Independence may refer to:

- First Indian War of Independence or the Indian Rebellion of 1857
- First Italian War of Independence (1848–1849)
- First War of Scottish Independence (1296–1328)

== See also ==
- War of Independence (disambiguation)
- Second War of Independence (disambiguation)
- First Battle of Independence, American Civil War
- The Indian War of Independence (disambiguation)
