= Drowned Ammet =

1977 novel by Diana Wynne Jones

- First edition
- Author: Diana Wynne Jones
- Cover artist: Peter Whiteman
- Language: English
- Series: Dalemark Quartet
- Genre: Fantasy, high fantasy, children's literature
- Publisher: Macmillan
- Publication date: 1977
- Publication place: Britain
- Media type: Print
- Pages: 255
- ISBN: 0-33-322620-8
- OCLC: 51870315
- Preceded by: Cart and Cwidder
- Followed by: The Spellcoats

Drowned Ammet is a fantasy novel for young adults by British author Diana Wynne Jones. It is the second book in the series Dalemark Quartet.

== Plot ==
The story begins with the birth of Alhammit Alhammitson, or Mitt, in South Dalemark. Mitt is a young child and his family is evicted from their farm. The Earl Hadd is the cruel and tyrannical ruler of South Dalemark. The family moves to an unpleasant tenement in the city of Holand. Mitt's father joins the Free Holanders, a resistance against the Earl Hadd. Mitt's father disappears and is apparently killed by the Earl's soldiers.

Mitt was convinced that three of the Free Holanders betrayed his father to the Earl's soldiers. Mitt is determined to take revenge. He joins the Free Holanders. Milda, Mitt's mother, marries Hobin.

Mitt plans to assassinate the Earl Hadd, but his attempt fails. The Earl is killed by another assassin, a sniper.

Ynen and Hildrida (Hildy) are brother and sister. Hildy is furious with her father. He betrothed her to Lithar, Lord of the Holy Islands, a complete stranger. After the assassination, the new Earl, Harl, refuses to break off her engagement. Hildy and Ynen decide to run away on a magnificent new boat, the Wind's Road.

Having been seen during the old Earl's assassination, Mitt is suspected. He hides on a magnificent boat, the one that Ynen and Hildy are running away on. Mitt is a stowaway beneath deck. They are far out to sea by the time Mitt shows himself. He demands that they take him to the North, where he can be safe. The two siblings are uncooperative. Mitt threatens them with his gun, saying he will shoot them if he gets the chance. Hildy and Ynen agree to take him North because he has a gun.

The three find, floating in the sea, a wheat figure of Poor Old Ammet. It had been thrown into the sea during a festival. They take the wheat figure on board and lash it to the prow as a figurehead. Mitt has a small wax figure of Poor Old Ammet's consort, Libby Beer, which they attach to the stern.

That night a dreadful autumn storm assailed the boat. After the storm passed, there is a lifeboat, with one sailor aboard. Mitt realizes that not only is the sailor the sniper who shot the old Earl, but he is also Mitt's long-lost father.

Mitt's father commandeers the boat, then forces them to sail to the Holy Islands. He plans to deliver Hildy to her fiancé, the Lord of the Holy Islands named Lithar, the man she was running away from, to avoid marrying. They arrive in the Holy Islands.

The Holy Islanders say that a great one "will come on the wind's road with a great one before him and behind". Hildy and Ynen are taken prisoner. Mitt's father convinces Lithar, to have his own son, Mitt killed. Instead, the Holy Islanders refuse to harm Mitt. They maroon him on an uninhabited Holy Island. Hildy meets with Libby Beer herself. Libby tells her that, if she wishes to return to the Holy Islands, she must trust Mitt. Hildy reluctantly agrees.

On the Holy Island, Mitt encounters two demigods, Old Ammet and Libby Beer, in person and learns their secret names. The uttering of the secret names produce cataclysmic effects. This explains the folk names by which the two demigods are called on Holy Islands: Earth Shaker for Poor Old Ammet, and She Who Raised the Islands for Libby Beer. Hildy and Ynen are re-united with their father Navis.

Navis tells his children that the new Earl wants to kill them. Mitt's father is taking Ynen and Navis back to Holand, but they are to be killed by the new Earl. Mitt arrives and invokes the greater name of Libby Beer, causing an island to rise up, destroying the boat. Mitt's father is killed.

The Holy Islanders send them off to sea to go North. Mitt promises Poor Old Ammet that someday, he will return to Holy Islands as a friend, not as a conqueror.

== Characters ==
- Mitt Alhamittsson is a young boy who styles himself a Freedom Fighter, a murderer, and ultimately a fugitive from the law.
- Hildrida Navissdaughter is the granddaughter of Earl Hadd, betrothed at the age of nine to the Lord of Holy Islands as a political alliance. Her temper tantrums are a force of nature.
- Ynen Navisson is the grandson of Earl Hadd, an ardent boat lover and sailor. Ynen is the only one of Hadd's grandchildren who is genuinely nice.
- Navis Haddsson is the third and youngest son of Earl Hadd and the father of Ynen and Hildrida. Unlike his brothers, he isn't cruel, but he hasn't done much of anything since his wife died.
- Earl Hadd is the cruel and tyrannical earl of Holand, who has a great wealth from his high taxes. He has three sons, Harl, Harchad, and Navis, and prefers his granddaughters to his grandsons because they can be married off to make alliances.
- Old Ammet is one of the Undying, also known as the Earth Shaker. Ynynen is the lesser of his hidden names, which shakes the earth when invoked. He is a particular friend of Mitt's. His original name is Alhammitt (like Mitt's), and he is often described as a man with long grey or pale yellow hair and a young-old face. There is a custom in Holand in which, every year, a straw figure of Ammet is thrown into the sea during the Autumn Festival to bring luck and prosperity. The ship lucky enough to find Old Ammet's figure lashes it to its prow as a figurehead and is said to meet with great fortune.
- Libby Beer is another one of the Undying and the wife of Poor Old Ammet. Her epithet is She Who Raised the Islands, and she is described as a woman in a green dress. Her lesser name causes plants to grow on any surface and her greater name raises land out of the sea. Her figure made of fruits and berries is also thrown into the sea during the Autumn Festival.

== Explanation of the novel's title ==
"Drowned Ammet" refers to the custom in Holand of throwing a straw figure of Poor Old Ammet into the ocean.
