= Azad Hind Bank =

Myanmar bank

Azad Hind Bank Indian National Bank National Bank of Azad Hind
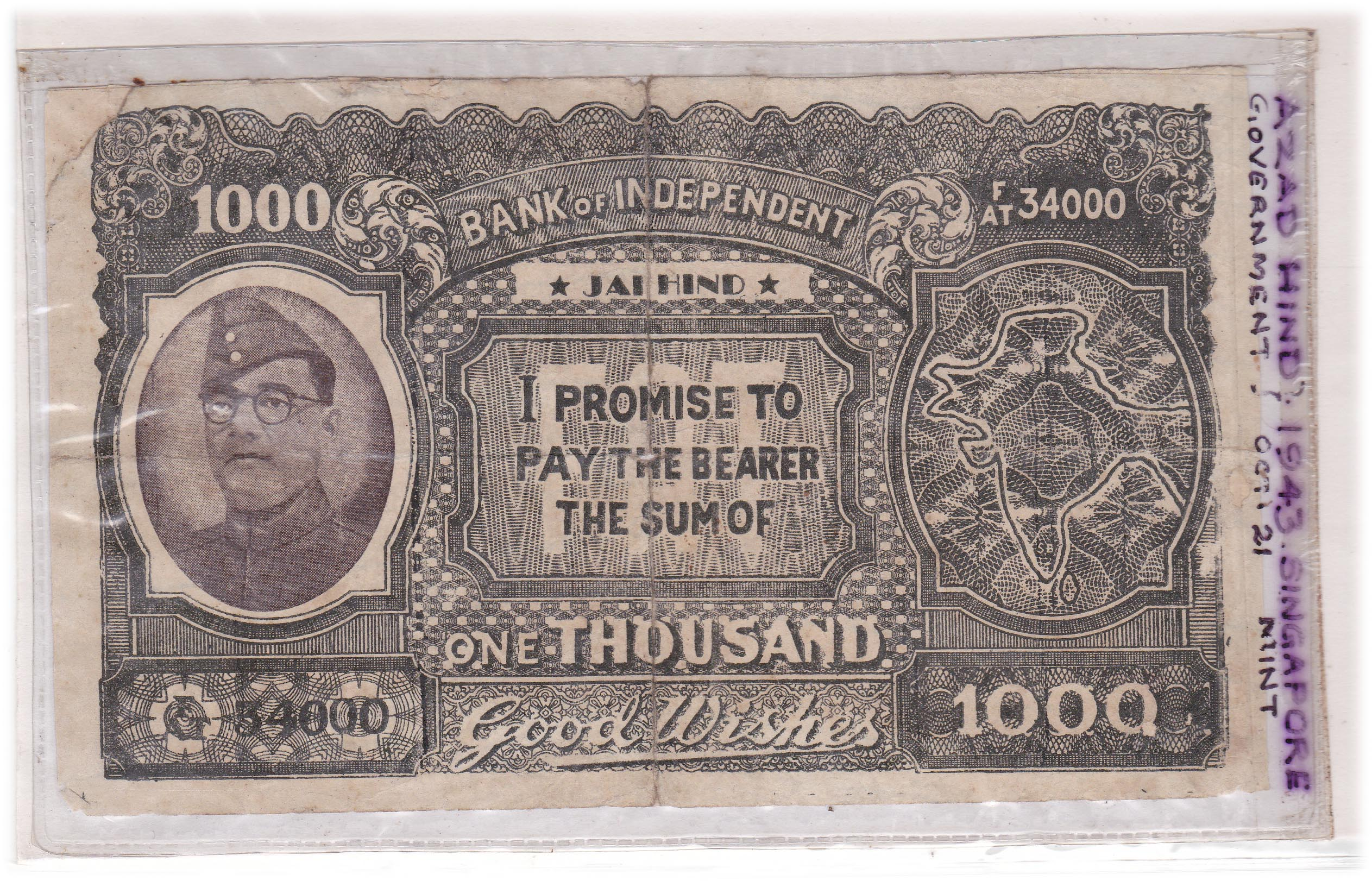
- Type: Public
- Industry: Banking, financial services
- Founded: 5 April 1944
- Headquarters: Rangoon
- Area served: Burma, Singapore and India
- Key people: Debnath Das (Chairperson)
- Owner: Azad Hind

Azad Hind Bank was established on 5 April 1944, at Rangoon, the then headquarters of the Provisional Azad Hind Indian government supported by Imperial Japan.

== Establishment ==
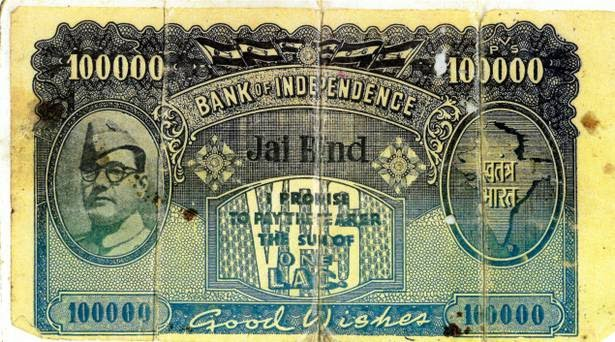
One Lak Rupees

On 21 October 1943 Subhash Chandra Bose formed provisional government of Azad Hind and early after it Bose declared war against British Raj and its allies on 23 October 1943.

Bose established the Azad Hind bank to manage funds donated by the Indian community from across the world for the liberation of India from the British Raj, while utilizing the bank's services for the operations of the Azad Hind Fauj. The bank maintained its branches throughout Japan occupied countries. The currency notes were issued in the form of Promissory note, and these notes were usually printed on one side. The money collected by the Azad Hind government was kept in the Bank. Initially the bank had an authorized capital of ₹ 5 million and paid-up capital of ₹ 2.5 million.

== See also ==
- Azad Hind
- Sher-e-Hind
