= Sepoy Mutiny (disambiguation) =

The Sepoy Mutiny or the Indian Rebellion of 1857 was a major Indian uprising against British rule in India

Sepoy Mutiny may also refer to these rebellions in India or by Indians:

- Vellore mutiny (1806), in Vellore, India
- 1915 Singapore Mutiny, by Indian recruits
- Barrackpore mutiny of 1824, in Barrackpore, India

== See also ==
- The Indian War of Independence (disambiguation)
