= Great Rebellion =

The Great Rebellion or Great Revolt is a term that is generally used in English for the following conflicts:

- First Jewish–Roman War in 66–73 CE, also known as the Great Revolt of Judaea
- Peasants' Revolt in England in 1381, also called Wat Tyler's Rebellion
- English Civil War in 1642–1651, also called English Revolution
- Rebellion of Túpac Amaru II in 1780–83, against Bourbon reforms in the Spanish Viceroyalty of Peru
- Wars of the Three Kingdoms, an intertwined series of conflicts that took place in England, Ireland and Scotland between 1639 and 1651, including the English Civil War
- Indian Rebellion of 1857, against the British East India Company
- In the northern states of the US, an alternate term used in naming the American Civil War (1861–65)
- East Timorese rebellion of 1911–12 against Portuguese colonial authorities
- Arab Revolt or Great Arab Revolt of 1917 (Arabic: الثورة العربية, romanized: al-Thawra al-‘Arabiyya; Turkish: Arap İsyanı), against the Ottoman Empire
- 1936–1939 Arab revolt in Palestine, also known as "the Great Revolt"
- Revolt of 1173–1174, sometimes called the "Great Revolt"

== Fiction ==
- The war against the Evil Horde in She-Ra: Princess of Power
- The Butlerian Jihad, an event in Frank Herbert's fictional Dune universe

== See also ==
- List of revolutions and rebellions
- The Indian War of Independence (disambiguation)
