= Azad Hind =

Indian provisional government during World War II

Provisional Government of Free India ʻĀrẓī Ḥukūmat-e-Āzād Hind
- 1943–1945
- Flag (de facto) Emblem
- Motto: Hindustani: Ittehad, Itmad aur Qurbani; 'Unity, Faith and Sacrifice'
- Anthem: Hindustani: Shubh Sukh Chain; 'Auspicious Happiness'
- Seal

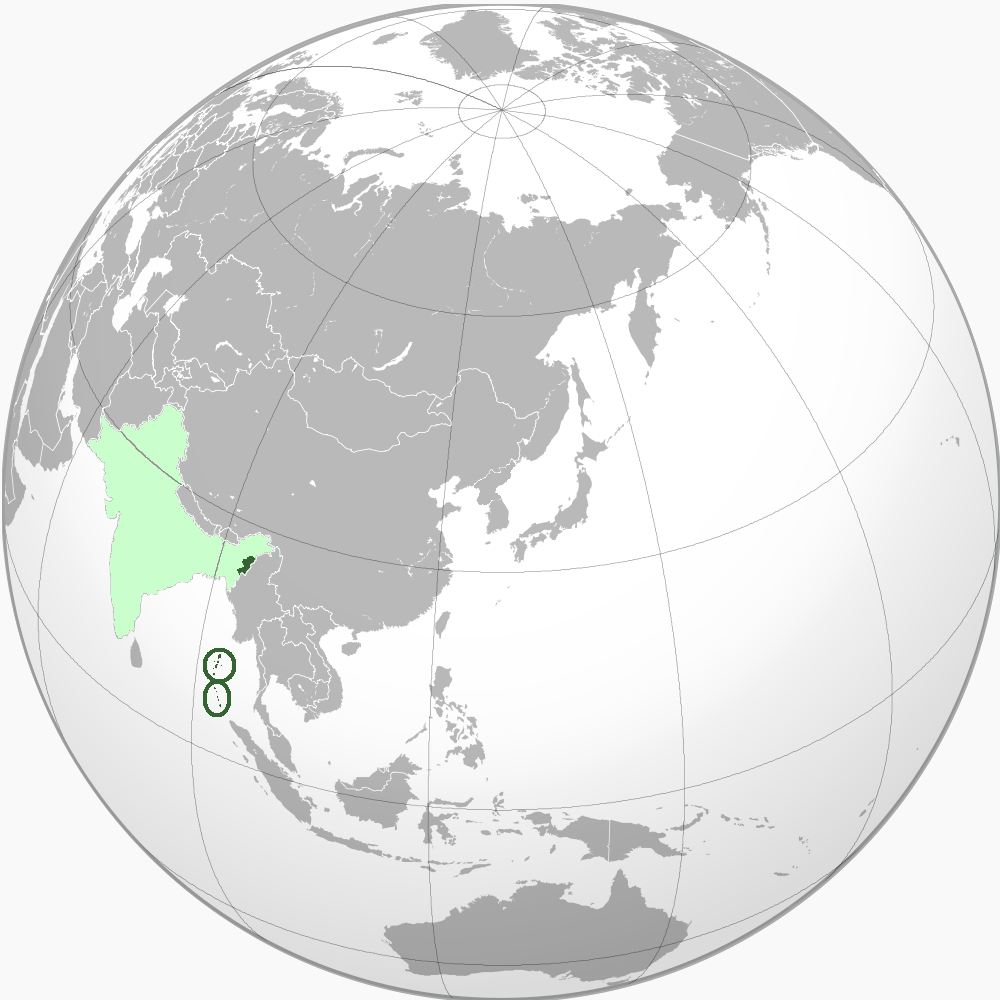
- Light green: Claimed territory; Dark green: Controlled territory (with Imperial Japanese assistance)
- Status: Puppet state of the Empire of Japan
- Capital: New Delhi (de jure); Singapore (de facto, in exile); Port Blair (provisional)
- Official language and national language: Hindustani
- Demonym: Indian
- Government: Provisional government
- President
  - 1943–1945: Subhas Chandra Bose
- Historical era: World War II
  - Established: 21 October 1943
  - Disestablished: 18 August 1945

Area
  - Total: 30,620 km^{2} (11,820 sq mi)
| Preceded by | Succeeded by |
| British Raj | British Raj |
- Today part of: India

The Provisional Government of Free India or, more simply, Azad Hind, was a short-lived Japanese-controlled provisional government in India. It was established in exile in Japanese-occupied Singapore during World War II in October 1943 and has been considered a puppet government of the Empire of Japan.

It was a part of the political movement originating in the 1940s outside India with the purpose of allying with the Axis powers to defeat the British Raj. It was established by Indian nationalists in exile during the latter part of the World War II in Singapore with monetary, military and political assistance from Imperial Japan.

Founded on 21 October 1943, the government was inspired by the concepts of Subhas Chandra Bose who was also the leader of the government and head of state. The government proclaimed authority over Indian civilian and military personnel in Southeast Asian British colonial territory and prospective authority over Indian territory to fall to the Japanese forces and the Indian National Army during the Japanese thrust towards India. The government of Azad Hind had its own currency, court and civil code, and in the eyes of some Indians, its existence gave a greater importance to the independence struggle against the British. Japan also handed over nominal authority of the Japanese-occupied Andaman and Nicobar Islands in 1943, though the government continued to be dependent on Japanese support.

Immediately after the formation of the provisional government, Free India declared war against the Allied forces on the Indo-Burma Front. Its army, the Indian National Army (Azad Hind Fauj), went into action against the British Indian Army and the allied forces as part of the Imperial Japanese Army in the Imphal-Kohima sector. The INA had its first major engagement at the Battle of Imphal where, under the command of the Japanese Fifteenth Army, it breached the British defences in Kohima, reaching the salient of Moirang before suffering a catastrophic defeat as the Allied forces held, and Allied air dominance and compromised supply lines forced both the Japanese and the INA to retreat. The existence of Azad Hind was essentially coterminous with the existence of the Indian National Army. While the government itself continued until the civil administration of the Andaman Islands was returned to the jurisdiction of the British towards the end of the war, the limited power of Azad Hind was effectively ended with the surrender of the last major contingent of INA troops in Rangoon. The death of Bose is seen as the end of the entire Azad Hind Movement.

The legacy of Azad Hind is, however, open to judgment. After the war, the Raj observed with alarm the transformation of the perception of Azad Hind from traitors and collaborators to liberators. After returning to India the veterans of the INA posed a difficult problem for the British government. The British feared that a public trial for treason on the part of the INA members might embolden anti-British sentiment and erupt into widespread protest and violence. The British Empire, which was seriously threatened by the INA, charged 300 INA officers with treason in the INA trials, but eventually backtracked in the face of opposition by the Congress.

== Establishment ==
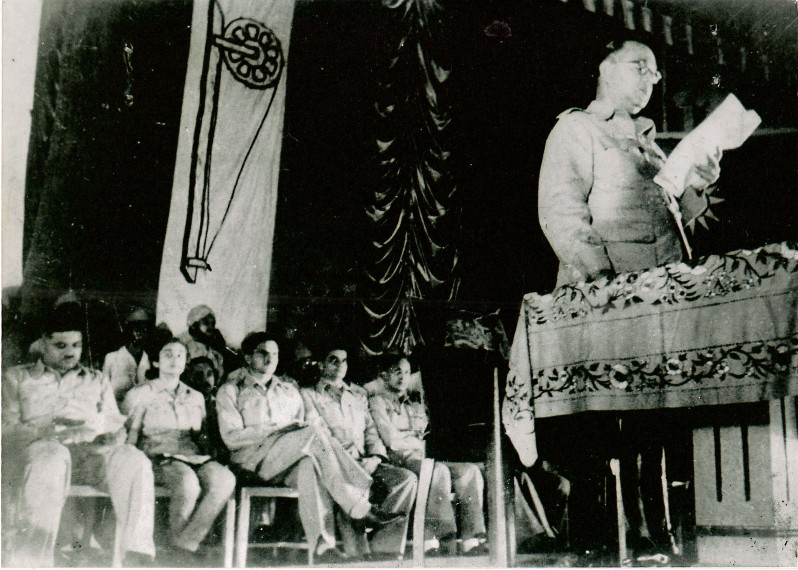
Subhash Chandra Bose proclaims the Provisional Government of Free India on 21 October 1943, Singapore

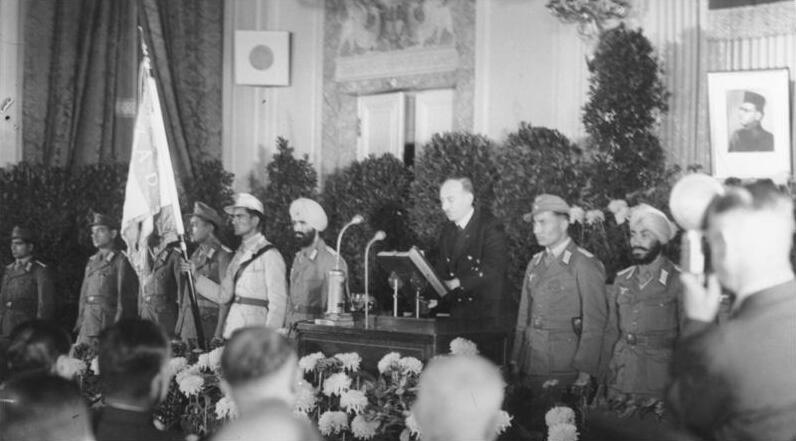
National celebration at the founding of the Provisional National Indian government at the Free India Center, Berlin, with Secretary of State Wilhelm Keppler speaking, on 16 November 1943.

The direct origins of Azad Hind can be linked to two conferences of Indian expatriates from across Southeast Asia, the first of which was held in Tokyo in March 1942. At this conference, convened by Rash Behari Bose, an Indian expatriate living in Japan, the Indian Independence League was established as the first move towards an independent Indian state politically aligned with the Empire of Japan. Rash also moved to create a sort of independence army that would assist in driving the British from India – this force would later become the Indian National Army. The second conference, held later that year in Bangkok, invited Subhas Chandra Bose to participate in the leadership of the League. Bose was living in Germany at the time and made the trip to Japan via submarine.

Rash Behari Bose, who was already ageing by the time the League was founded, struggled to keep the League organised and failed to secure resources for the establishment of the Indian National Army. He was replaced as president of the Indian Independence League by Subhas Chandra Bose; there is some controversy as to whether he stepped down of his own volition or by pressure from the Japanese who needed a more energetic and focused presence leading the Indian nationalists.

Bose arrived in Tokyo on 13 June 1943 and declared his intent to make an assault against the eastern provinces of India in an attempt to oust the British from control of the subcontinent. Bose arrived in Singapore on 2 July, and in October 1943 formally announced the establishment of the Provisional Government of Free India at the Cathay Cinema Hall. In defining the tasks of this new political establishment, Subhas declared: "It will be the task of the Provisional Government to launch and conduct the struggle that will bring about the expulsion of the British and their allies from the soil of India." Bose, taking formal command of the demoralised and undermanned Indian National Army from Rash Bose, turned it into a professional army with the help of the Japanese. He recruited Indian civilians living in Japanese-occupied territories of South-east Asia and incorporated vast numbers of Indian POWs from British forces in Singapore, Malaya and Hong Kong to man the brigades of the INA.

== Ministers ==
The Provisional Government of Free India consisted of a Cabinet headed by Subhas Chandra Bose as the Head of the State, The Prime Minister and the Minister for War and Foreign Affairs.

Captain Dr. Lakshmi Swaminadhan (later married as Lakshmi Sahgal) was the Minister in Charge of Women's Organization. She held this position over and above her command of the Rani Jhansi Regiment, a brigade of women soldiers fighting for the Indian National Army. For a regular Asian army, this women's regiment was quite visionary; it was the first of its kind established on the continent. Lakshmi was one of the most popular and prosperous gynaecologists in Singapore before she gave up her practice to lead the troops of the Rani of Jhansi Regiment.

Other public administration ministers of the Provisional Government of Free India included:

- Lakshmi Swaminadhan – The Minister in Charge of Women's Organization
- S. A. Ayer – The Minister of Broadcasting and Publicity
- Lt. Col. A. C. Chatterji – The Minister of Finance

The Indian National Army was represented by Armed Forces ministers, including:

- Lt. Col. Aziz Ahmed
- Lt. Col. N. S. Bhagat
- Lt. Col. J. K. Bhonsle
- Lt. Col. Guizara Singh
- Lt. Col. M. Z. Kiani
- Lt. Col. A. D. Loganathan
- Lt. Col. Ehsan Qadir
- Lt. Col. Shahnawaz Khan

The Provisional Government was also constituted and administered by a number of Secretaries and Advisors to Subhas Chandra Bose, including:

- Capt. Dilip Singh Siwach
- A. M. Sahay – Secretary
- Karim Ghani
- Debnath Das
- D. M. Khan
- A. Yellapa
- J. Thivy
- Sardar Ishar Singh Narula
- A. N. Sarkar – the government's official Legal Advisor

All of these Secretaries and Advisory officials held Ministerial rank in the Provisional Government. The extent of the Provisional Government's day-to-day management of affairs for Azad Hind is not entirely well-documented, so their specific functions as government officials for the state outside their positions as support ministers for Subhas Chandra Bose is not entirely certain.

== Recognition ==
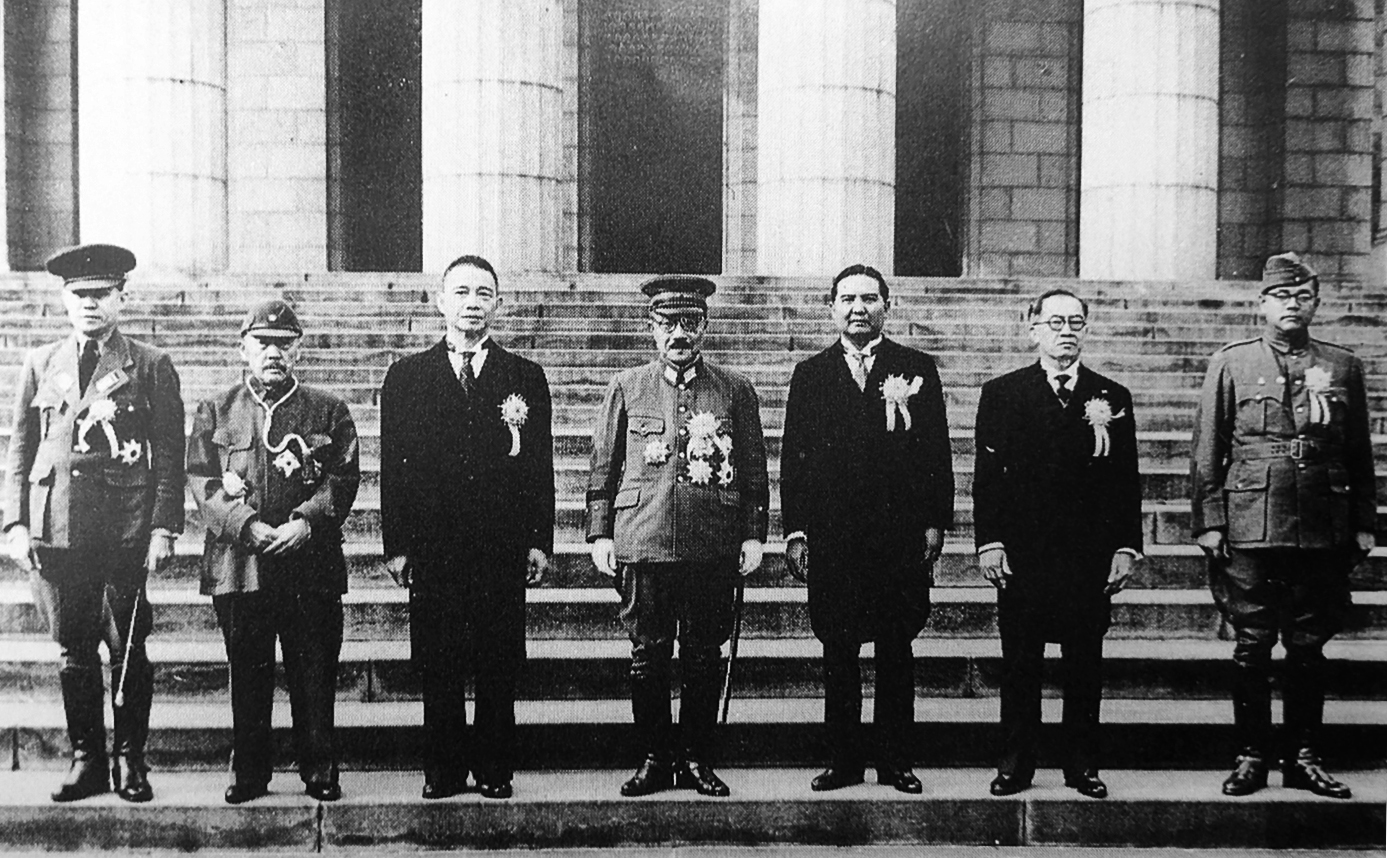
Greater East Asia Conference in November 1943, participants left to right: Ba Maw, Zhang Jinghui, Wang Jingwei, Hideki Tojo, Wan Waithayakon, José P. Laurel, Subhas Chandra Bose.

Azad Hind was recognised as a legitimate state by only a small number of countries limited solely to Axis powers and their allies. Azad Hind had diplomatic relations with nine countries: Nazi Germany, the Empire of Japan, Italian Social Republic, and Wang Jingwei Government, Thailand, the State of Burma, Manchukuo and the Second Philippine Republic. Vichy France, however, although being an Axis collaborator, never gave formal political recognition to Azad Hind. This government participated as an observer in the Greater East Asia Conference in November 1943.

== Government administration and World War II ==
The same night that Bose declared the existence of Azad Hind, the government took action to declare war against the United States and Britain. The government consisted of a Cabinet ministry acting as an advisory board to Subhas Bose, who was given the title "Netaji" (translating roughly to "leader") and was no doubt the dominant figure in the Provisional Government. He exercised virtual authoritarian control over the government and the army. With regards to the government's first issuances of war declarations, Hugh Toye writes:

The Cabinet had not been unanimous about the inclusion of the U.S.A. Bose had shown impatience and displeasure – there was never any question then or later of his absolute authority: the Cabinet had no responsibility and could only tender advice ...

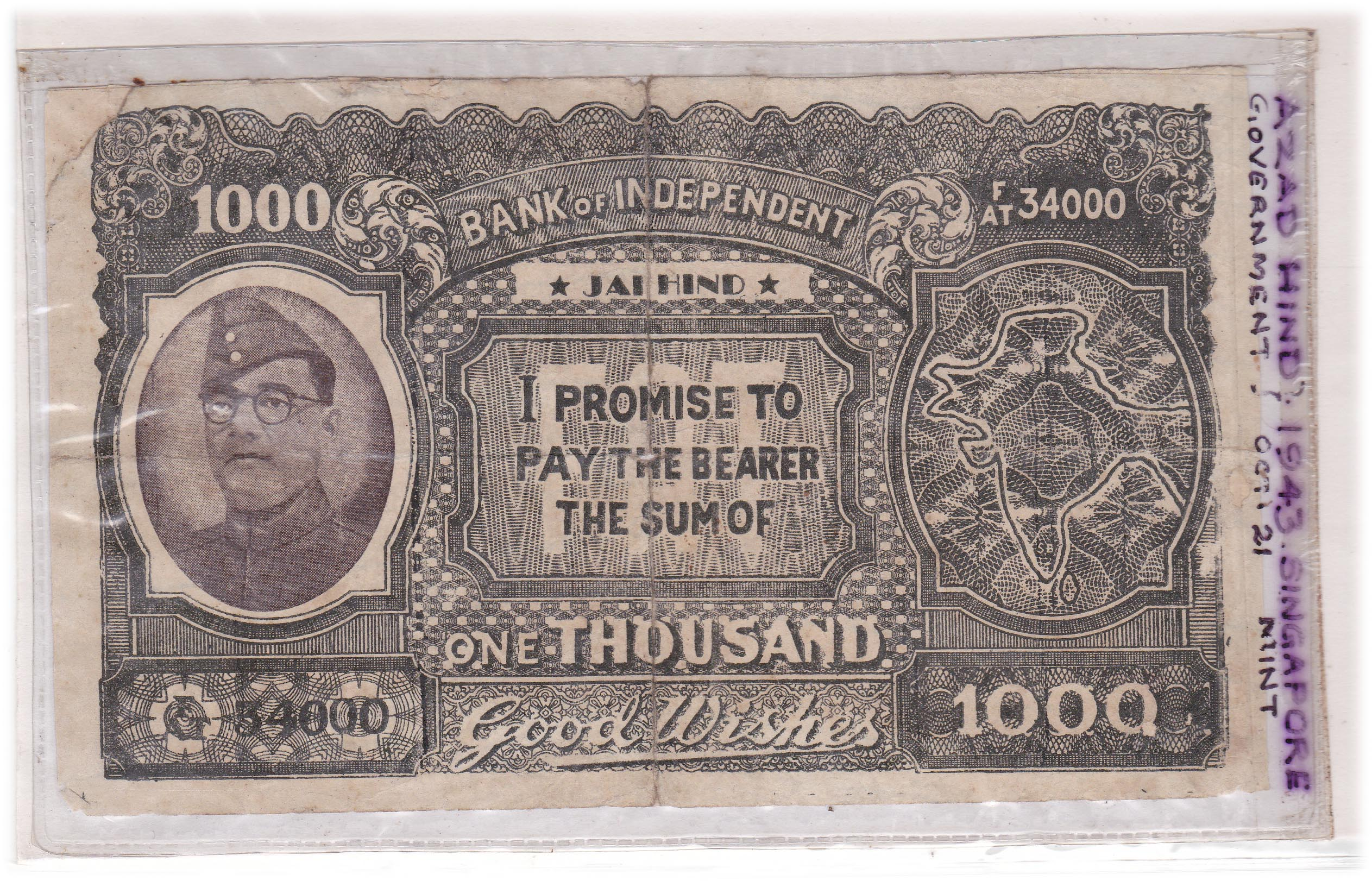
Currency issued by the Azad Hind Bank

At the end of October 1943, Bose flew to Tokyo to participate in the Greater East Asia Conference as an observer to Japan's Greater East Asia Co-Prosperity Sphere; it could not function as a delegate because India had technically fallen outside the jurisdiction of Japan's definition of "Greater East Asia", but Bose gave speeches in opposition to Western colonialism and imperialism at the conference. By the end of the conference, Azad Hind had been given a limited form of governmental jurisdiction over the Andaman and Nicobar Islands, which had been captured by the Imperial Japanese Navy early on in the war.

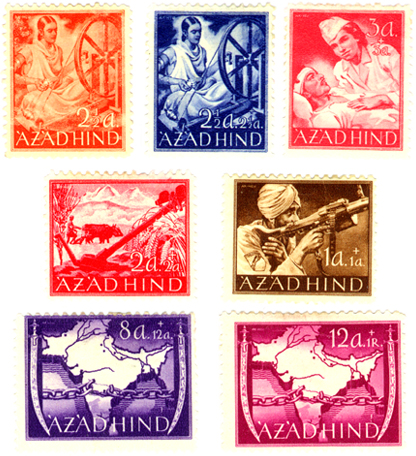
Unreleased postage stamps of the Azad Hind government

Once under the jurisdiction of Azad Hind, the islands formed the government's first claims to territory. The islands themselves were renamed "Shaheed" and "Swaraj", meaning "martyr" and "self-rule" respectively. Bose placed the islands under the governorship of Lt Col A. D Loganathan, and had limited involvement with the official governorship of the territory, instead involving himself in plans to expand the Indian National Army, ensure adequate men and materiel, and formulate its course of actions and the administrations and relations of the Indian population in southeast Asia and determining Japanese designs in India and his provisional government. In theory, the government itself had the power to levy taxes on the local populace, and to make and enforce laws: in practice, they were enforced by the police force under Japanese control. Indians were willing to pay these taxes at first but became less inclined to do so towards the end of the war when the Provisional Government enacted legislation for higher war-time taxes to fund the INA. During his interrogation after the war, Loganathan admitted that he had only had full control over the islands' vestigial education department, as the Japanese had retained full control over the police force, and in protest, he had refused to accept responsibility for any other areas of Government. He was powerless to prevent the Homfreyganj massacre of 30 January 1944, where forty-four Indian civilians were shot by the Japanese on suspicion of spying. Many of them were members of the Indian Independence League, whose leader in Port Blair, Diwan Singh, had already been tortured to death in the Cellular Jail after doing his best to protect the islanders from Japanese atrocities during the first two years of the occupation.

Azad Hind's military forces in the form of the INA saw some successes against the British and moved with the Japanese army to lay siege to the town of Imphal in eastern India. Plans to march towards Delhi, gaining support and fresh recruits along the way, stalled both with the onset of monsoon season and the failure to capture Imphal. British bombing seriously reduced morale, and the Japanese along with the INA forces began their withdrawal from India.

In addition to these setbacks, the INA was faced with a formidable challenge when the troops were left to defend Rangoon without the assistance of the Japanese in the winter of 1944–1945. Loganathan was relocated from the Andaman Islands to act as field commander. With the INA garrison about 6,000 strong, he manned the Burmese capital in the absence of any other police force or troops during the period between the departure of the Japanese and the arrival of the British. He was successful in maintaining law and order to the extent that there was not a single reported case of dacoity or of looting during the period from 24 April to 4 May 1945.

== Indian areas under the administration of the Provisional Government ==
Almost all of the territory of the Provisional Government lay in the Andaman Islands, although the Provisional Government was allowed some authority over Indian enclaves in Japanese-occupied territories. Provisional Government civil authority was never enacted in areas occupied by the INA; instead, Japanese military authority prevailed and responsibility for administration of occupied areas of India was shared between the Japanese and the Indian forces.

== INA defeat and Provisional Government collapse ==
Left to defend Rangoon from the British advance without support from the Japanese, the INA was soundly defeated. Bose was suggested to leave Burma to continue his struggle for Indian independence and returned to Singapore before the fall of Rangoon; the government Azad Hind had established on the Andaman and Nicobar Islands collapsed when the island garrisons of Japanese and Indian troops were defeated by British troops and the islands themselves retaken. Allegedly Bose himself was killed in a plane crash departing from Taiwan attempting to escape to the Soviet Union. The Provisional Government of Free India ceased to exist with the deaths of the Axis, the INA, and the disappearance of Bose in 1945.

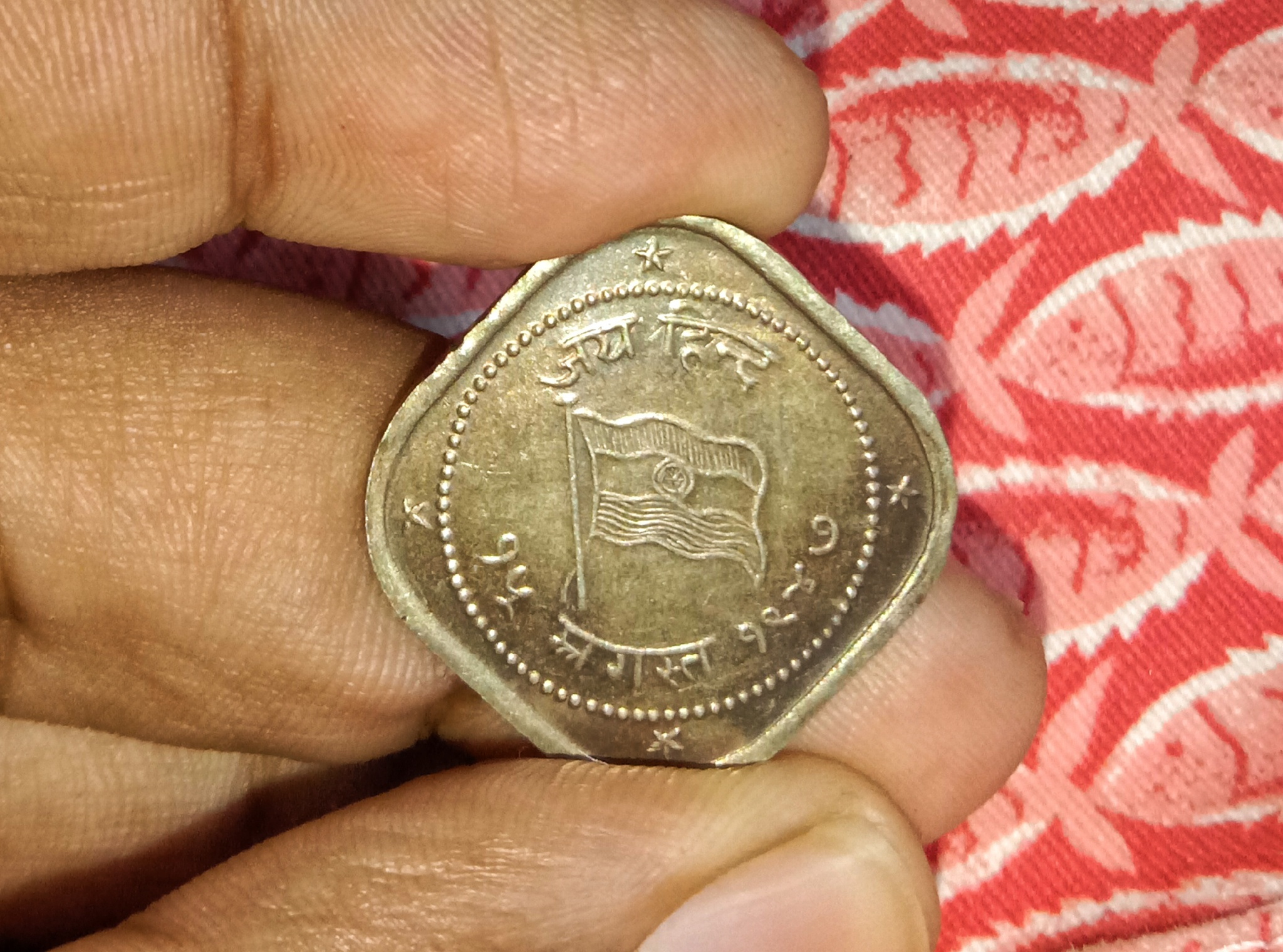
Two Annas Token currency, minted in August 1947, in remembrance of the Azad Hind

The troops who manned the brigades of the Indian National Army were taken as prisoners of war by the British. A number of these prisoners were brought to India and tried by British courts for treason, including a number of high-ranking officers such as Colonel Gurbaksh Singh Dhillon. The defence of these individuals from prosecution by the British became a central point of contention between the British Raj and the Indian Independence Movement in the post-war years.

== Relations with the Axis powers ==
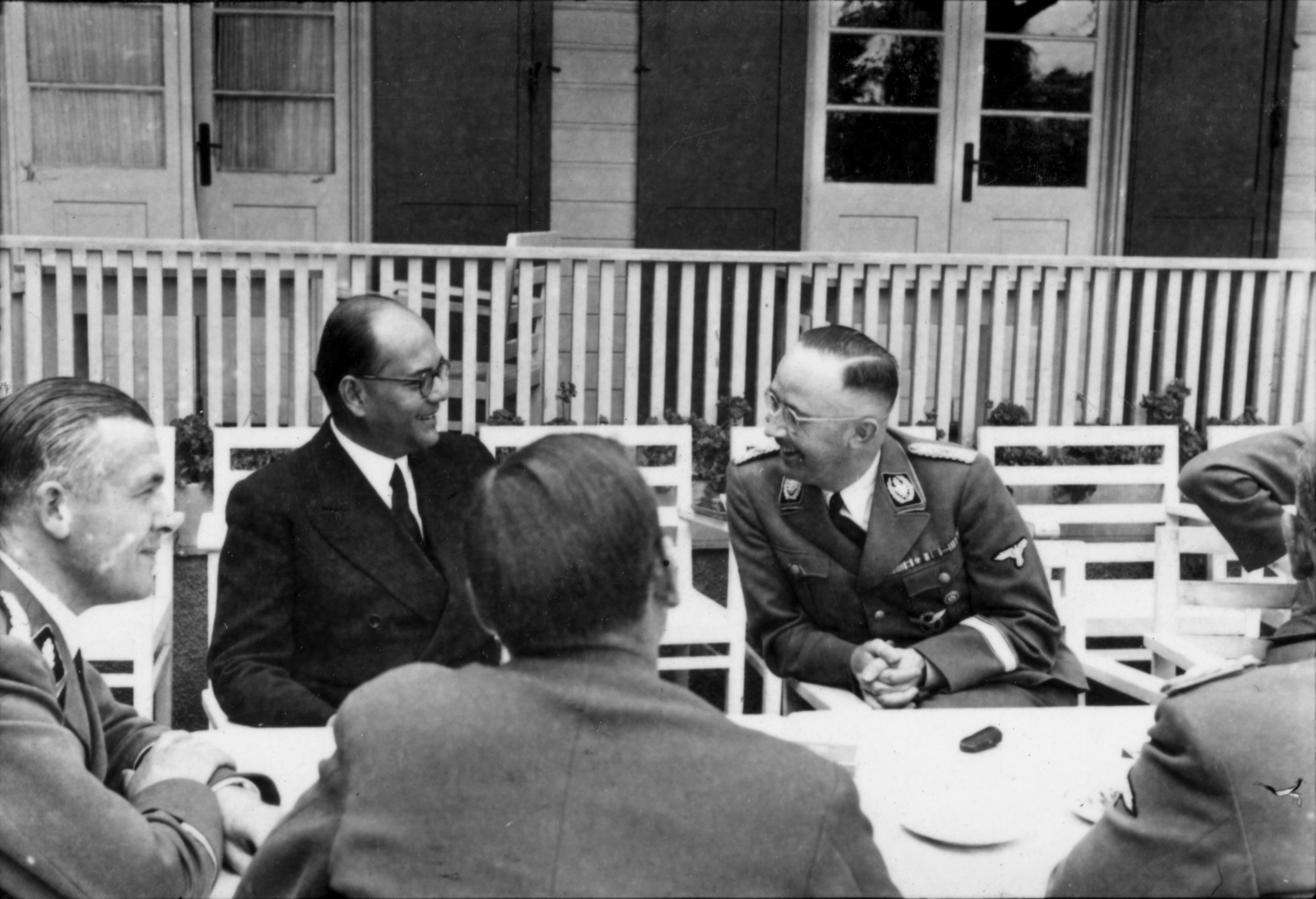
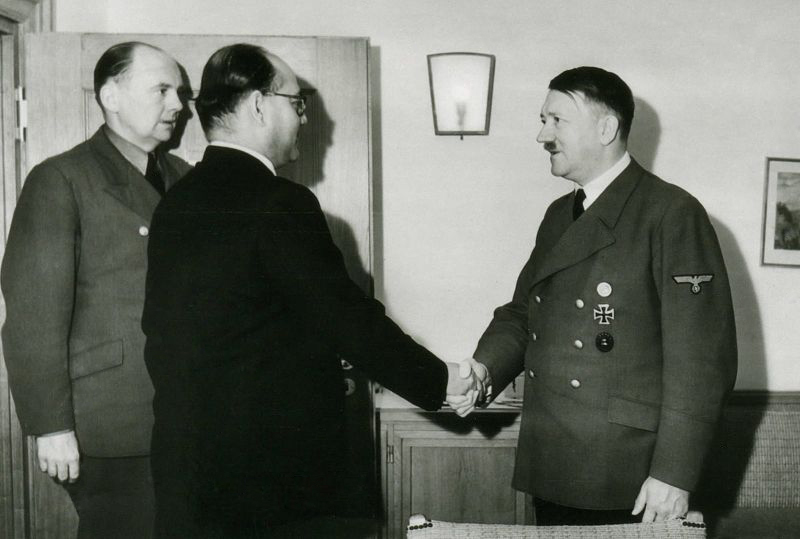
(left) Bose with Heinrich Himmler, the Nazi Minister of Interior, head of the SS, and the Gestapo, 1942; (right) Subhas Bose shaking hands with Adolf Hitler

Since Subhas Chandra Bose was aligned with the Empire of Japan and the Axis powers, which also included Nazi Germany and Fascist Italy, Britain portrayed him as a controversial figure for his official stance against imperialism which would run contrary to Japanese imperialism in Asia during World War II. Bose himself claimed to oppose all manner of colonial practices but labeled Britain as hypocritical in "fighting a war for democracy" while refusing to extend the same respect for democracy and equal rights to their colonial subjects in India. Bose opposed British racial policy and declared working for the abolition of racial discrimination with Burmese, Japanese and other Asians.

Britain accused Bose of fascism, citing his role in the Provisional Government of Azad Hind as evidence of this, and pointed to his wanting to establish a totalitarian state in India with the blessings of the Axis powers. Bose believed that parliamentary democracy was unsuitable for India immediately after independence and that a centrally organised, self-sufficient, semi-socialist India under the firm control of a single party was the best course for Indian government. Some of his ideas would help shape Indian governmental policy in the aftermath of the country's independence from Britain.

It has been argued that the fact that Azad Hind was aligned politically with Japan and the Axis Powers may have had more to do with what Bose saw as a pragmatic approach to Indian independence. Disillusioned with Congress's non-violent movement, Bose was clearly of the camp that supported exploiting British weakness to gain Indian independence. Throughout the existence of Azad Hind, Bose sought to distance himself from Japanese collaboration and become more self-sufficient but found this difficult since the existence of Azad Hind as a governmental entity had only come about with the support of the Japanese, on whom the government and army of Azad Hind were entirely dependent. Bose, however, is considered a hero by some in present-day India and is remembered as a man who fought fiercely for Indian independence. However, Subhas Chandra Bose had supported Fascism and Nazism before the start of WWII, declaring that India needed "a synthesis of what modern Europe calls socialism and fascism" in a speech in made in Calcutta in 1930.

Although Japanese troops saw much of the combat in India against the British, the INA was certainly by itself an effective combat force, having faced British and allied troops and making their mark in the Battle of Imphal. On 18 April 1944 the suicide squad led by Col. Shaukat Malik broke through the British defence and captured Moirang in Manipur. The Azad Hind administration took control of this independent Indian territory. Following Moirang, the advancing INA breached the Kohima road, posing a threat to the British positions in both Silchar and Kohima. Col. Gulzara Singh's column had penetrated 250 miles (400 km) into India. The Azad Brigade advanced, by outflanking the Anglo-American positions.

However, INA's most serious, and ultimately fatal, limitations were the reliance on Japanese logistics and supplies and the total air-dominance of the allies, which, along with a supply line deluged by torrential rain, frustrated the INA's and the Japanese bid to take Imphal.

With the siege of Imphal failing, the Japanese began to shift priority for resource allocation from South Asia to the Pacific, where they were fighting United States troops advancing from island to island against Japanese holdings there. When it had become clear that Bose's plans to advance to Delhi from the borders of Burma would never materialise due to the defeat of the INA at Imphal and the halt of Japanese armies by British aerial and later naval superiority in the region, Japanese support for Azad Hind declined, and then fully collapsed with the surrender of Japan to the Americans on 2 September 1945.

== See also ==
- Collaboration with Imperial Japan
- List of World War II puppet states
- List of Indian independence activists
- Subhas Chandra Bose
- Indian National Army
- Azad Hind Bank
- Azad Hind stamps
- Azad Hind Radio
- Decorations of Azad Hind
- Free India Centre
- Indian Legion
- Battaglione Azad Hindoustan
- Hindu–German Conspiracy
