= Crown Duel =

Book by Sherwood Smith

- First edition of the single-volume release, 2002
- Author: Sherwood Smith
- Cover artist: Victor Lee
- Language: English
- Genre: Young adult fiction Fantasy literature
- Publisher: Harcourt, Firebirds
- Publication date: June 2002
- Publication place: US
- Media type: Print
- Pages: 471
- ISBN: 0-14-230151-5
- Preceded by: A Stranger to Command

Crown Duel is a 2002 young adult fantasy novel written by American author Sherwood Smith, originally published as two separate books, Crown Duel (1997) and Court Duel (1998). Both stories take place in the fictional land of Sartorias-deles, a fantasy world Smith has written about since her youth. The first book follows the adventures of young Countess Meliara "Mel" Astiar of Tlanth as she and her small group of forces rebel against the greed of King Galdran; along the way the mysterious Marquis of Shevraeth aids her, though she distrusts him. With the king now dead, the second part focuses on Mel's journey to the court in Remalna-city, where she must navigate court intrigues surrounding Shevraeth's rise to power as king. In 2008 Smith also published a prequel about Shevraeth: A Stranger to Command.

Smith invented Sartorias-deles as a fantasy world that gradually became populated by humans over a number of centuries; these new arrivals were influenced by the world's indigenous beings enough to better themselves, largely eradicating societal problems like disease and overpopulation. She originally wrote Crown Duel as a twenty-year-old, and when she returned to rewrite the story later in life, she sought to maintain the story from Mel's young perspective. As a result, the novel's intended audience are young adults. As Smith's most popular YA novel, both parts of Crown Duel received generally positive reviews. Reviews of the 1997 publication of Crown Duel highlight the character of Mel and Smith's worldbuilding as positive elements. Critics assessed Court Duel as generally the lesser of the two.

== Background and development ==
While Sherwood Smith originally wrote Crown Duel as two separate books entitled Crown Duel (1997) and Court Duel (1998), she considered them as "one story." Both novels explore the fictional land of Sartorias-deles, the world she has been writing about since her youth. Smith grew up wondering why "[her surroundings were] the way [they were]" for instance observing, "Why were the cities so clean, I wondered when I was a kid. I knew about sewers, etc. Why is it safe to drink from a stream there, and not here?". She conceived Sartorias-deles as a world where, over the course of several centuries, humans of many different races entered through "worldgates" and were influenced by the culture of its indigenous beings. According to Smith, while her invented world was not perfect, it contains fewer problems than Earth has endured, such as disease and overpopulation. She wrote,

"basically, the indigenous life forms, appalled by these things that came through and started multiplying and spreading out, carrying their diseases and wars, tried to fix things for the humans ... Their history is not all happy, it's very strange, and humans still have many human problems, but in other ways they are somewhat different from [Earth]."

According to Smith, Sartorias-deles most resembles New Zealand. Smith's stories set in the world of Sartorias-deles have "focuse[d on] a generation of kids with remarkable abilities who are born into extraordinary times." Meliara ("Mel") is the protagonist of Crown Duel, which is set in the fictional country of Remalna. Remalna's human population lives alongside the mysterious Hill Folk, sentient beings that reside in the land's forests and with whom Mel has a special affinity. Smith wrote the first part as a twenty-year-old, and sought to keep it set in Mel's teenage point of view when typing it out as someone older than forty. Smith describes the stories' primary audience as "middle grade or YA, because I was young and writing from the kid's eye view." At the same time, she made some changes to the original story based on her experience, such as providing motivations for the adult characters and "nail[ing] down place and time more thoroughly than I did." When Smith learned as a teenager that "anyone could write a book," she tried to write stories that would please potential publishers, as she assumed that they would never approve of "real stuff" like Crown Duel. Several decades before Crown Duel's release, Smith "began the laborious process of consolidating" her notes on Sartorias-deles. As part of her development of the novel, she drew inspiration from European history; for example, details like the novel's fan language and changing fashions were inspired by the fashions at the Palace of Versailles court of Louis XIV.

== Synopsis ==
=== Part One – Crown Duel ===
The novel begins in the fictional country of Remalna in Sartorias-deles, where seventeen-year-old Countess Meliara "Mel" Astiar of Tlanth makes an oath to her dying father. She swears in that oath that she and her older brother Count Branaric "Bran" (21) will defend their people from the growing greed of King Galdran. Galdran covets the Tlanth lands for his cruel cousin, Baron Nenthar Debegri, and also seeks to break the Covenant – an ancient pact between humans and the Hill Folk – by resuming the harvest of their valuable "colorwoods". When Mel and Bran learn of these plans, they feel compelled to fulfill their promise and enter into a war ill-prepared and severely outnumbered.

Debegri attempts to subdue Tlanth under the pretense of unpaid taxes and for conspiring to break the Covenant. Mel and Bran and their small group of forces – mostly farmers and tradespeople – initially succeed at foiling Debegari with guerilla tactics, such as blockading a stream to flood the enemy's camp. However, the war changes for the worse when the capable Marquis of Shevraeth (25), the heir to the nearby principality of Renselaeus, takes command from Debegari. Shevraeth soon captures Mel and takes her to the capitol of Remalna-city, imprisoning her. Shevraeth tells her that the king orders her to surrender Tlanth's forces or face execution. Mel refuses, and soon escapes imprisonment with the help of their family spy, Azmus.

Mel tries to return to Tlanth, with Debegri, Shevraeth and (ostensibly) his cousin the Duke of Savona in pursuit. Along the way people of the countryside assist her, but Debegri eventually captures Mel, furious about the months of trouble she caused. Taken to Debegri's nearby fortress to be tortured, Shevraeth unexpectedly frees her and takes her to Renselaeus where she finds Bran. Shevraeth and his father reveal that they had been secretly fighting Galdran for years, wish to form an alliance with the Astiars, and plan for Shevraeth to take the throne. However, Mel refuses their help still deeply distrustful of Shevraeth and thinking of the promise made by Bran herself to their father: to become Remalna's rulers. Mel also thinks of Shevraeth as insincere, having been taught by her father to distrust of anyone who resides at court.

On the journey back to Tlanth, unknown forces assault Mel and Bran, and, believing her brother dead, Mel escapes to continue on alone. She thinks that Shevraeth betrayed her, and begins rallying her forces to attack him. Recognizing the misunderstanding, Shevraeth responds by using hostages to force Mel to surrender and brings her to her brother, injured but alive. Soon Shevraeth openly opposes King Galdran, and accompanies the Astiars to fight the royal forces. They kill Galdran, ending the war and creating opportunity for a change in power in Remalna. Bran, who has gradually befriended Shevraeth, goes to court with him while Mel returns to Tlanth.

=== Part Two – Court Duel ===
Victorious after defeating the King in the war, Meliara returns to Tlanth to improve its dilapidated castle with the family's new riches. One day, Bran visits her, accompanied by his new fiancé Lady Nimiar Argaliar and the Marquis of Shevraeth, who is preparing to take the throne of Remalna. Now accustomed to the fine fashions of court, Bran expresses dismay at finding Mel dressed in old clothes - she never before cared about her appearance. Mel becomes shy and embarrassed about her lack of courtly finesse and grace, and avoids the visitors, especially Shevraeth, who she fears looks down on her. Nimiar convinces Mel to return with them to court, and begins to teach her the essential of life there, including its customs, clothing styles, and hand fan language.

Once in Remalna-city, Mel finds herself popular in part because of her now legendary rebellion against the unpopular King Galdran. She acquires many male admirers, and is friendly but dismissive towards their romantic attentions. Mel avoids Shevraeth when possible, though when she often unexpectedly encounters him, Mel fights to remain cordial while he remains inscrutable but polite. Meanwhile, Galdran's sister, the Marquise of Merindar, attempts to manipulate Mel into distracting Shevraeth from her covert plans to take the throne for herself, though this is largely unsuccessful.

While at court, Mel begins exchanging letters and tokens with a secret admirer. She gradually opens up her feelings of ignorance and being out of her depth at court; they also discuss court politics and academic subjects, with her admirer offering advice and encouragement about her growing knowledge. Meanwhile, Mel meets Merindar's reclusive son Flauvic and pursues a brief relationship with him before realizing that she has no real feelings for him. Through this relationship experience, she begins to realize her exchange of letters has become a courtship, though she does not know her admirer's identity.

Mel learns from her spy Azmus that northern mercenaries have been seen near the border – allies of the Marquise of Merindar – and that other allied forces are planning on eradicating the Hill Folk to take their "colorwoods" for payment. Mel sends Azmus to tell Shevraeth and rides out to warn the Hill Folk, but is shocked to encounter Shevraeth already on the road. Initially, he assumes she is plotting with Merindar against him, but lets her go when she tells him about the plans against the Hill Folk. An outnumbered Mel bravely tries to stop a group of mercenaries marching towards nearby forests, and is only saved by forces sent by Shevraeth. The Hill Folk now safe, Mel returns to Shevraeth, where she learns that he successfully put down Merindar's revolt. She also learns that he has been her secret admirer. After finally calling him by his first name, Vidanric, they kiss. The two return to Remalna-city, and find that Flauvic has secretly bewitched the entire capitol. As Flauvic prepares to complete his victory, the Hill Folk come to Mel's rescue and turn him into a tree. With the realm now secure, Shevraeth and Mel marry and are crowned as king and queen.

== Style and genre ==
Crown Duel has been labeled a coming-of-age story. According to The ALAN Review, Mel's "journey from captivity to freedom parallels her coming of age," in which she "comes to realize that she has led a very sheltered life and that people are often not what they seem." This teenage perspective affects how the reader views the novel's events – Smith has commented that if she "see[s] a story from a kid's eye view, then what shapes that story is how kids look at the world." In Brigham Young University's Children's Book and Play Review, Leah Hanson wrote that as a result, "we view the happenings at court with her same confusion and suspicion." Writing for the same publication, Lillian H. Heil added that "the reader learns to expect that she will plunge into every situation with minimal thought about the consequences."

Crown Duel deviates from the typical rebellion story by treating its success as another problem to be dealt with. Comparing this to the George Orwell story Animal Farm, Leigh Kimmel wrote that by defeating "the wicked king at midpoint, the second half involv[es] court intrigues of the provisional government as the next king is decided upon," thus increasing the challenges for the protagonist. Rather than face armies and weapons, Mel must contend with a court where "war is just as intense and bewildering as on the battlefield--except swords have been traded for fans and armor discarded for elaborate dresses."

== Publication ==
In the United States, Harcourt published Crown Duel in April 1997, and followed it with a sequel, Court Duel, in March of the following year. According to Smith, this split was made because her original novel was "already 'too long' for production costs." Firebird Books combined the two into one edition, also entitled Crown Duel, in 2002. Rich Horton, writing in Locus magazine, attributes this republication to the growing popularity of YA fantasy, as writers and publishers observed the success of Harry Potter and other fantasy stories.

In 2008, Smith released a prequel to Crown Duel entitled A Stranger to Command, which follows the Marquis of Shevraeth's early life learning military command. In 2010, Book View Café released another edition of Crown Duel as an e-book, which combined the two main stories in tandem with a new short story entitled "Vidanric's Birthday Surprise," in addition to six scenes from Vidanric's point of view.

== Reception ==
Jim C. Hines, co-editor of the fantasy anthology Heroes in Training, considers the combined volume of Crown Duel to be Smith's most popular YA book. Reviews for the first 1997 edition of Crown Duel have been generally positive, with reviewers highlighting Smith's worldbuilding ability and Mel's worthiness as a protagonist. Booklist reviewer Carolyn Phelan stated that Smith "tells a fast-moving tale of adventure, intrigue, and honor, with Mel a likable heroine and a lively narrator." Phelan added that "characters and setting are well realized, but the novel seems plot driven from its midpoint almost to the book's end." Lillian H. Heil of Brigham Young University also found favor with the novel's heroine, noting in her review that Mel's "fortitude in the face of enormous difficulties, her willingness to admit her mistakes, and her concern for others make her an appealing, if stubborn, young woman." Author Jo Walton, contributing to Tor.com, wrote that the first book "has a fairly predictable plot," but a "terrific YA heroine" redeems its flaws. Walton thought that the story drew strength from its teenage perspective, because "we get immersed in the world and the problems of the world and see [Mel] grow up from the inside, in the best traditions of YA fiction."

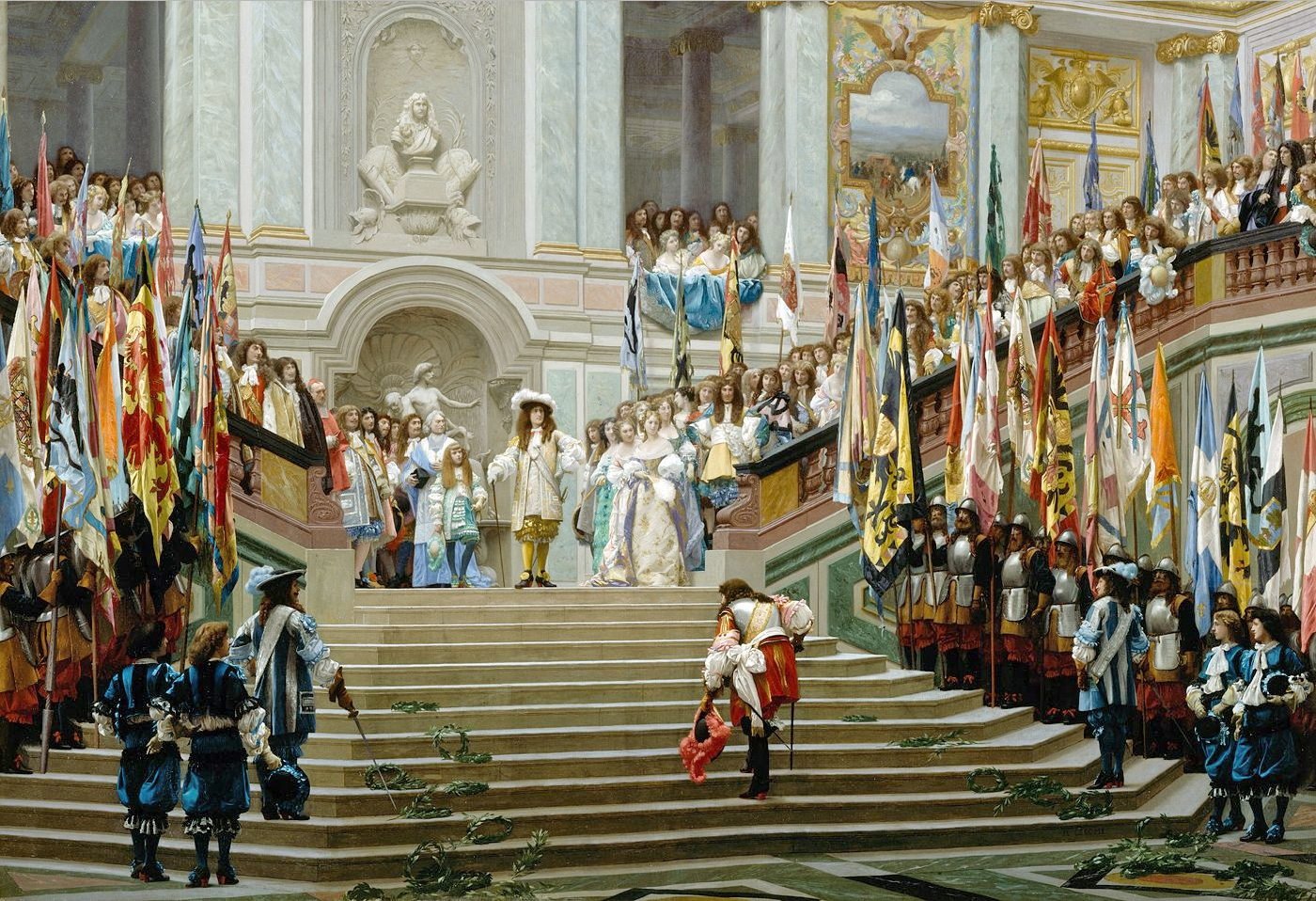
Réception du Grand Condé à Versailles by Jean-Léon Gérôme, 1878; Mel's coming to court was deemed similar to that of a "stranger coming to Versailles" (pictured) by Jo Walton.

In another review of the first book, Publishers Weekly noted that Smith "create[s] a fantasy world fit for the most discriminating medieval partisan. It cleverly walks just this side of parody, getting away with lines like, 'I wished I could personally flout him and his busy searchers, and make him look the fool he was.'" In a similar vein, Kirkus Reviews praised the first novel as "Smith's lush descriptions evoke a fantastic yet credible world, where magic spells and enchanted stones are everyday facts of life." M. Jean Greenlaw, contributing to The ALAN Review, lauded Smith for her "language and imagery" as well as "her deft plotting [to] keep the reader glued to the pages." Writing for the School Library Journal, Patricia Lothrop-Green, however, gave a largely negative review to the first part, highlighting "huge logical leaps," an "utterly predictable plot," and a heroine whom "many readers will be thoroughly tired of" by the end of the story.

Reviewers generally have found less to favor in Smith's second book, Court Duel, though reviews have still been mainly positive. It was noted by Carolyn Phelan of Booklist to be "different in setting, structure, and tone" from its predecessor, who added that "readers who loved Crown Duel for its strongly realized fantasy world, adventurous characters, and scenes of action may find the sequel disappointing," though she found Meliara to be "as compelling as ever." Ruth Cox of Emergency Librarian observed "a flicker of the love/hate relationship often found in adult romance novels between Meliara and Shevraeth." Contributing to Brigham Young's Children's Book and Play Review, Leah Hanson called the second part "fast paced and intriguing," and said it could "stand on its own as an enthralling story." Jo Walton believed that the second story's changing fashions and fan customs were "done very well," and added that the court's culture of terror felt real. She opined that "Mel's eruption into their midst has in it something of the stranger coming to Versailles, and it's fascinating," but called "Mel's continued obliviousness to the identity of her mysterious Unknown correspondent" "slightly implausible." Walton concluded that the combined volume Crown Duel is "a charming book with a solid background and a great first person voice. Give it to your twelve year old friends, and read it with your inner twelve-year-old eyes." The publication Voice of Youth Advocates included Crown Duel in its list of "fantasy for people who don't like fantasy," and wrote that the novel "ha[s] few fantastical creatures, and readers will relate easily to the main characters."
