= Wren's War =

- First edition
- Author: Sherwood Smith
- Cover artist: Dennis Nolan
- Language: English
- Series: Wren series
- Genre: Fantasy
- Publisher: Jane Yolen Books (1995); Firebird (2004)
- Publication date: March 1995, May 2004
- Publication place: United States
- Media type: Print (hardback & paperback)
- Pages: 210 (first edition, hardback); 224 pp (Firebird edition, paperback)
- ISBN: 978-0-15-200977-9 (first edition, hardback); ISBN 978-0-14-240162-0 (Firebird 2004 edition, paperback)
- Preceded by: Wren's Quest
- Followed by: Wren Journeymage

Wren's War is the final book in Sherwood Smith's initially published trilogy of Wren books, first published in March 1995. It is currently the final printed volume in the Wren Series, with the sequel, Wren Journeymage, available exclusively in electronic form. As with the prior two volumes, it is set in the east-of-the-Great-Desert region of that world.

== Plot summary ==
Andreus finally begins the military maneuvers against Meldrith which had been feared in Wren to the Rescue. Lirwani agents launch a covert strike to abduct Tess and assassinate the King and Queen. These events take place while Wren is on vacation in Alat Los. As part of the plot, Tess is drugged via a drink presented to her by one of the agents posing as a stable worker, but the effect does not take full hold until she is in a hidden staircase in the palace, and is rescued by her most loyal servant after reviving in time to witness her parents' murder. After being evacuated to a building in the hills, Tess raises the alarm to Wren, Tyron, and Conor using the summons rings which they began using after the events of Wren's Quest.

Capitalizing on the disarray inflicted by the toppling of royal order, Andreus moves the full force of his army into Meldrith, over 1 million troops in all. Tess organizes all support she can in order to mount raids against the Lirwani occupation forces, which were not yet evenly spread throughout Meldrith's lands. Wren and Tyron, having been successfully recalled earlier, are sent to seek the aid of Hawk Rhiscarlan, who is known to have now set himself up in some form of power at the ruins of his ancestral home, directly south of Senna Lirwan.
