= Wren Journeymage =

ebook image

Wren Journeymage is the sequel to Wren's War, and so far the last book written about the character Wren.

== Publishing status ==
The book was originally slated for publication by Jane Yolen Book, but the line was canceled. Sherwood Smith finished it as part of a contract with Viking to re-publish the first three books in the series with Firebirds, but publication was cancelled again.

Sherwood Smith has since published the first draft at Book View Café, preparatory to releasing it as an e-book.

This book is available as an ebook as of 2010.

== Plot summary ==
The first summer of peace brings Wren on her weekly visit to the young Queen Teressa, where she encounters the derisive, upsetting Hawk Rhiscarlan riding in! Wren races to warn Teressa, to discover he's expected, which causes the girls' first argument. Tyron gives Wren a chance to leave Meldreth by sending her on a new journeymage project—to find Connor, who had wandered off to the Summer Isles. When Wren vanishes, her scry stone abandoned, Teressa veers between regret over the argument, worry about Wren, and the beguilement of attraction as Hawk skillfully upsets her court. Wren has just made friends with some young sailors when they are captured and forced on board a shady smuggler, where Wren learns all about the sea. When pirates attack, Wren does magic, which leads her straight to another confrontation with the villain she hates most, aided by the boy she . . . what do you call these feelings? Once again the four—Wren, Teressa, Connor, and Tyron—find themselves deep in adventure, as they try to navigate the treacherous waters of growing up.
