= Elizabeth E. Wein =

American writer

- Born: October 2, 1964 (age 61); New York City, New York, U.S.
- Citizenship: United States; United Kingdom
- Education: Yale University, University of Pennsylvania
- Writing career
- Language: English
- Genres: Young adult literature, historical fiction, science fiction
- Notable work: Code Name Verity
- Website: elizabethwein.com

Elizabeth E. Wein (/wiːn/, born October 2, 1964) is an American-born writer best known for her young adult historical fiction. She holds both American and British citizenship.

== Personal life ==
Elizabeth E. Wein was born in New York City on October 2, 1964. She moved to England when she was three. When she was six, her father, Norman Wein, was sent to the University of the West Indies in Jamaica, where she lived from 1970 to 1973. As a child, she was fluent in Jamaican Patois.

Wein moved back to the United States when her parents separated, and she was raised by her mother Carol Flocken in Harrisburg, Pennsylvania until her death in a car accident in 1978, after which Wein lived with her maternal grandparents. She wrote her first novel at age 11. Wein attended Yale University and, after a year of work-study in England, spent seven years getting a PhD in Folklore at the University of Pennsylvania. Wein moved to England with her English husband Tim in 1995 and settled in Scotland in 2000. She and Tim have two children.

Wein has a passion for planes, and she possesses a private pilot licence which she received in 2003.

== Writing career ==
Wein's first five books recount a version of the King Arthur stories which moves the narrative to the Kingdom of Aksum in 6th century Ethiopia. The stories focus on her interpretation of Medraut (Mordred) and his half-Aksumite, half-British son Telemakos.

Her 2012 novel, Code Name Verity, is a World War II thriller focusing on the friendship between an English woman, a Scottish woman, a transport pilot and a spy. It received critical acclaim; it was awarded an Edgar Award for Best Young Adult Novel and designated a Michael L. Printz Award Honor book in 2013. A follow-up novel, Rose Under Fire, also set in World War II, tells the story of an Air Transport Auxiliary pilot who is captured and sent to the Ravensbrück concentration camp.

Wein's short stories have been published in collections edited by Ellen Datlow, Terri Windling, and Sharyn November. She is a regular reviewer for the New York Times Book Review.

== Works ==
=== Novels ===
- Black Dove, White Raven (Disney-Hyperion, February 2015, ISBN 978-1423183105)
- Star Wars: The Last Jedi: Cobalt Squadron (Disney-Lucasfilm Press, 2017, ISBN 1368008372)
- Firebird (Barrington Stoke, 2018, ISBN 9781781128312)
- White Eagles (Barrington Stoke, 2019, ISBN 978-1781128961)

==== Code Name Verity sequence ====
These novels take place before or during World War II and share a number of recurring characters.

- Code Name Verity (Egmont UK, 2012; Disney-Hyperion, 2012, ISBN 978-1423152194; Doubleday Canada, 2012)
- Rose Under Fire (Egmont UK, June 2013; Disney-Hyperion, September 2013, ISBN 978-1423183099; Doubleday Canada, September 2013)
- The Pearl Thief (Disney-Hyperion, May 2017, ISBN 978-1484717165)
- The Enigma Game (Bloomsbury Children's (UK), May 2020, ISBN 978-1526601650)

==== The Lion Hunters: the Arthurian/Aksumite Cycle ====
1. The Winter Prince (Atheneum, 1993; reissued by Firebird Books, 2003, ISBN 978-0142500149)
2. A Coalition of Lions (Viking, 2003)
3. The Sunbird (Viking, 2004)
4. The Mark of Solomon 1: The Lion Hunter (Viking, 2007)
5. The Mark of Solomon 2: The Empty Kingdom (Viking, 2008)

=== Short stories ===
- "Change of Heart". In From a Certain Point of View (Star Wars). ed. Elizabeth Schaefer. New York: Del Rey, 2017.
- "The Color of the Sky". In A Tyranny of Petticoats. ed. Jessica Spotswood. Somerville, MA: Candlewick Press, 2016.
- "The Battle of Elphinloan". In Taking Aim. ed. Michael Cart. New York: HarperTeen, 2015.
- "For the Briar Rose". In Queen Victoria's Book of Spells. ed. Ellen Datlow and Terri Windling. New York: Tor, 2013.
- "Something Worth Doing". In Firebirds Soaring. ed. Sharyn November. New York: Firebird Books, 2009.
- "Always the Same Story". In The Coyote Road: Trickster Tales. ed. Ellen Datlow and Terri Windling. New York: Viking, 2007.
- "Chain of Events". In Rush Hour: Reckless. ed. Michael Cart. New York: Delacorte Books for Young Readers, June 2006.
- "Chasing the Wind". In Firebirds. ed. Sharyn November. New York: Firebird Books, 2003.
- "A Dear Gazelle". In Marion Zimmer Bradley's Fantasy Magazine Issue 47 (2000), pp. 34–38.
- "The Ethiopian Knight". In Odyssey: A Magazine of Science Fiction and Fantasy Issue 7 (1998), pp. 42–46.
- "No Human Hands to Touch". In Sirens and Other Daemon Lovers. ed. Ellen Datlow and Terri Windling. New York: HarperPrism, 1998; reprinted New York: Eos, 2002.
- "The Bellcaster’s Apprentice". In The Horns of Elfland. ed. Ellen Kushner, Delia Sherman, and Donald G. Keller. New York: Roc/Penguin USA, 1997.
- "New Year’s Eve". In Not the Only One. ed. Tony Grima. Boston: Alyson Press, 1995.
- "Fire". In Writers of the Future. Vol. IX. ed. Dave Wolverton. Los Angeles: Bridge Publications, 1993.

=== Nonfiction ===
- A Thousand Sisters: The Heroic Airwomen of the Soviet Union in World War II (Balzer + Bray, 2019, ISBN 978-0-06-245301-3)
