= The Firebringer Trilogy =

- Cover of the first edition of Birth of the Firebringer
- Birth of the Firebringer, Dark Moon, The Son of Summer Stars
- Author: Meredith Ann Pierce
- Country: United States
- Language: English
- Genre: Young adult speculative fiction
- Publisher: Atheneum Books
- Published: 1985-1996

The Firebringer Trilogy is a fantasy series written by Meredith Ann Pierce. The first novel, Birth of the Firebringer, was published in 1985, followed by Dark Moon in 1992, and concluding with The Son of Summer Stars in 1996. Remembered for Pierce's rich use of language, the series fell out of print in the early 90s, and began commanding high prices online. The series was re-published in paperback by Firebird Books in 2003.

The series follows Jan, prince of the Vale-dwelling unicorns of the Ring. His people have been exiled from their sacred homeland by the poisonous wyverns for the last 400 years, and are awaiting the arrival of the Firebringer, a prophesied warrior who will bring the gift of fire to the tribe and lead them in the battle to reclaim their homeland.

The trilogy differs from many fantasy novels in that humans are not the focus, although in Dark Moon they play a major role. These unicorns talk, act, think and grow as main characters, not as afterthoughts, and their actions may surprise a reader versed in traditional unicorn mythology.

Pierce first created the story that would become Birth of the Firebringer as a child. With her brother's input, she developed a rough version of the book's opening scene. She continued to write the story for a number of years, but then abandoned it until she graduated from college.

== Plot summary ==
=== Birth of the Firebringer ===
ISBN 0-14-250053-4

Although his father is the prince of the unicorns, Jan worries that he isn't worthy of his prophesied destiny and that he can't live up to his father's legacy. When he follows the warrior unicorns on their pilgrimage, he accidentally leads his friend Dagg and a warrior named Tek through a series of dangers, culminating in a battle with a deadly wyvern, the hated enemy of the unicorns.

=== Dark Moon ===
ISBN 0-316-70744-9

Jan and Tek, finally adults in the eyes of the herd, pledge their love only to have their blossoming relationship interrupted by a vicious attack. Jan is swept by the ocean to a foreign land while Tek, pregnant with their offspring, flees from Jan's father to the protection of her hermit mother.

Trapped in a human city by a population that believe him to be a god, Jan struggles to regain his memories. With the help of Ryhenna, a plain horse rather than a unicorn, he escapes back to the sea. As he tries to find his way back to his herd, Jan begins to understand his role as the new prince.

=== The Son of Summer Stars ===
ISBN 0-14-250074-7

Jan and Tek confront their past while their children, gifted with foresight, help them prepare the unicorns for realizing their destiny. When it matters the most, his father goes mad and flees from the herd, Jan crosses through the plains of the renegade unicorns, a parched desert, and finally into the realm of dragons, where he is shown the history of the terrible wyverns.
