= Senrid =

2007 novel by Sherwood Smith

- Author: Sherwood Smith
- Language: English
- Genre: Fantasy novel
- Publisher: YA Angst
- Publication date: May 1, 2007
- Publication place: United States
- Media type: Hardback
- Pages: 448
- ISBN: 1-934169-62-5

Senrid is an original fantasy novel by Sherwood Smith published in May 2007 by Norilana Books, reissued by Book View Café

== Blurb ==
Senrid is a fifteen-year-old king of a powerful nation. He relies mainly on his intelligence and personal skills to manage his kingdom. The plot centers on his relationships with his relatives, who oppose his rule, and his growing connection with people from a rival group who initially viewed him as an antagonist.

== Plot summary ==
Senrid is King of Marloven Hess, but in name only because his uncle Tdanerand holds the power. When the Marlovens try to attack the nearby kingdom of Vasande Leror they are defeated by the combined efforts of Vasande Leror's King Leander, his small army, a little bit of magic and a shapeshifting girl named Faline. Senrid's first mission is to get revenge on Leander (and his whining sister Kitty) and Faline. This gets more complicated as many allies of Leander and Faline get involved to try to rescue them. Eventually as magic combines and nearly destroys them in a battle they are thrown off world. When they get back, Senrid must travel and discover whether he wants to join the evil black mages for power or join the white forces of good to help his country.

== Main characters ==
Senrid : King of Marloven Hess, this is his story of self-discovery.

Leander: King of Vasande Leror

Kitty: Sister to Leander

Faline: a Yxuebarec (shapechanger) from Mearsies Heili.

Tdanerand: Senrid's uncle who is trying to take over Marloven Hess.
