= Trouble Under Oz =

Book by Sherwood Smith

- First edition
- Author: Sherwood Smith
- Illustrator: William Stout
- Language: English
- Series: The Oz books
- Genre: Children's novel Fantasy
- Publisher: HarperCollins
- Publication date: 2006
- Publication place: United States
- Media type: Print (Hardcover)
- Pages: 256
- ISBN: 978-0-06-029609-4
- OCLC: 70803263
- LC Class: PZ7.S65933 Tro 2006
- Preceded by: The Emerald Wand of Oz
- Followed by: Sky Pyrates Over Oz

Trouble Under Oz is a 2006 novel by Sherwood Smith, illustrated by William Stout and published by HarperCollins. It is a sequel to Smith's 2005 novel The Emerald Wand of Oz which is a further continuation of the Oz series started by L. Frank Baum in 1900.

Dori and Em, Dorothy Gale's modern-day descendants from the previous book, return in this second installment. Dori travels to Oz in answer to a summons from Princess Ozma, while Em remains behind to deal with their parents' impending divorce. Ozma asks Dori to travel with Prince Inga to the Nome Kingdom; there they will aid Prince Rik to take control of the throne and avoid a war. The adventurers must defeat an Iron Giant and confront monsters on their way; they meet mermaids and invisible children.

Smith uses characters and locations from several Baum books, including Ozma of Oz, Dorothy and the Wizard in Oz, The Emerald City of Oz, Tik-Tok of Oz and Rinkitink in Oz.
