= A Stranger to Command =

2008 novel by Sherwood Smith

- Author: Sherwood Smith
- Language: English
- Genre: Fantasy novel
- Publication date: August 2008
- Publication place: United States
- Media type: Print (hardback & paperback)
- Pages: 480 (first edition, hardback)
- ISBN: 1-934648-55-8 (first edition, hardback)

A Stranger to Command (2008) is a fantasy novel written by Sherwood Smith. It was written as a prequel to her first published work that takes place on the actual Sartorias-deles, Crown Duel.

== Synopsis ==
Vidanric Renselaeus, fifteen-year-old Marquis of Shevraeth, finds himself sent across the continent to a military academy in Marloven Hess, a kingdom known for its violent history. Vidanric is used to civilized life in pleasant Remalna—except that the evidence is increasingly clear that the civilization is only on the surface. Too many young, smart heirs have suffered accidents of late, and the evidence is beginning to point to the king, Galdran, who has grandiose plans for expansion.

In Marloven Hess, no one can pronounce his real names, and they assume his title is his name. He becomes Shevraeth—discovering that there are no marquises or dukes or barons in this kingdom, and no one has the slightest interest in Remalna. Or in foreigners. Until very recently, the academy was closed to outsiders. But the king—also fifteen, and recently come to his throne after a nasty civil war—wants him there.

Learning about command turns out to be very different from what Shevraeth had assumed, and the Marlovens, who are going through political and social change at all levels, are not at all what he expected. He makes friends as well as enemies; experiences terror and laughter as well as challenges on the field and off.

He discovers friendship, loyalty—and love.

'All the while greater events in the world are moving inexorably toward conflagration, drawing the smartest of the young people into key positions—whether they want it or not. They're going to have to be ready.'

== Publishing history ==
- 2008, Norilana Books, YA Angst (ISBN 1-934648-55-8), pub date ? August 2008, hardback (First Edition)
- 2009, Norilana Books, YA Angst (ISBN 978-1-934648-56-8, ISBN 1-934648-56-6), pub date 15 June 2009, paperback
- 2010, Book View Cafe, corrected e-book edition, (ISBN 978161138 072 9)
