= Wren's Quest =

1993 novel by Sherwood Smith

- First edition
- Author: Sherwood Smith
- Cover artist: Dennis Nolan
- Language: English
- Series: Wren series
- Genre: Fantasy
- Published: 1993 (Harcourt Books)
- Publication place: United States
- Media type: Print (hardback & paperback)
- Pages: 199 (first edition, hardback)
- ISBN: 978-0-15-200976-2 (first edition, hardback)
- Preceded by: Wren to the Rescue
- Followed by: Wren's War

Wren's Quest is a 1993 fantasy novel by American author Sherwood Smith, the sequel to Wren to the Rescue, and provides further background and character-development leading into Wren's War.

== Plot summary ==
Hawk Rhiscarlan attempts to gain favor with Andreus of Senna Lirwan by succeeding where Andreus was foiled in Wren to the Rescue. Tyron is deployed in the guise of a dog in order to gain reconnaissance among the nobles of Cantirmoor which might reveal who is behind the trouble, but is captured by Hawk. During this time, unaware of the new plot afoot, Wren ventures to the records center for the Siradi border guards who found her in a brigand-devastated trade caravan as a very young child. Wren is accompanied by Connor Shaltar for protection in case of any trouble, though that idea was hatched by Leila and Queen Astren of Meldrith to allow Connor to avoid confinement by his uncle Fortian Rhismordith to a particular vacation house as punishment for his tendency to socialize with stage performers.

Excursion into such remote territory fails to spare the pair form the interesting times, however, as they are forthwith pursued incessantly yet intermittently by mysterious and vaguely menacing couriers clothed in blue, culminating in an entire forest fire being levied as an attack against the protagonists, which Connor manages to dispel though an exertion of his own manner of magic, which leaves him prostrate and asleep for two full days.

Upon regaining consciousness, Connor discovers his location to have changed to that of a stone fortification of considerable vintage, whereupon Wren briefs him regarding the elapsed time and the fact that this is indeed the Siradi border-guard records center, as well as one of their command posts.
