= The Darkangel Trilogy =

Series of novels by Meredith Ann Pierce

- Cover of the first edition of The Darkangel
- The Darkangel, A Gathering of Gargoyles, The Pearl of the Soul of the World
- Author: Meredith Ann Pierce
- Country: United States
- Language: English
- Genre: Epic fantasy
- Publisher: Atlantic Monthly Press, Little, Brown
- Published: 1982–1990

The Darkangel Trilogy is a series of novels by American author Meredith Ann Pierce published between 1982 and 1990. It is set in the distant future, when the Moon has long since been terraformed into a lush paradise complete with its own animals, plants, and races.

== The Trilogy ==
=== The Darkangel ===
Darkangel, the first volume of the trilogy, was published in 1982. The book received favorable critical reception, winning the International Reading Association's annual "Children's Book Award" for first novel, listed on the American Library Association's "Best Books for Young Adults" roster, and was eventually chosen for The New York Times' "Notable Children's Booklist". In 1984, the novel won the Jane Tinkham Broughton Fellowship in Writing for Children from the Bread Loaf Writer's Conference, 1984.

In the first volume, Eoduin, a beautiful young woman, is abducted by a vampyre while out gathering flowers with her slave, Aeriel, and is carried off to be the vampyre's bride. Aeriel, determined to avenge her mistress, returns to the peak from which Eoduin was stolen and waits for the vampyre to return. Eventually, he takes her, but not to be his bride. She is to continue her existence as a slave, but now she has thirteen mistresses, the vampyre's brides, who have all been reduced to wraiths by the stealing of their blood, hearts, and souls. Unable to tell which is Eoduin, Aeriel eventually learns to love them all for her mistress' sake.

Wandering in the garden of Irrylath, the vampyre's keep, Aeriel comes upon a duarough, a tiny man who turns to stone in sunlight, but becomes flesh in shadow. He is a mage, and he gives her a rhyme and sends her on a quest, for if the darkangel (the vampyre) can be destroyed before he takes his fourteenth and last wife, then the power of the White Witch (his 'mother') will be checked for a time. His death will also prevent his becoming a full vampyre and joining with his six 'brothers' in trying to rule the world.

And so, Aeriel flees the castle and begins a quest that takes her wandering far into the desert to find the hoof of a starhorse, the traditional guardian of the realm that the vampyre has usurped. With this talisman, she prepares to defeat the vampyre by using the starhoof to make a brew that would kill him.

Upon her return to the castle, Aeriel is told she will be killed. But Aeriel's execution is stayed so that she can make a wedding sari for his fourteenth, and last, bride. He leaves, only to return empty-handed because none of the brides are more beautiful than Aeriel has become, having been physically changed by her journeys in the desert. The vampyre demands that Aeriel become his bride, much to her dismay. In the wedding ritual, Aeriel gives the vampyre the brew that will kill him.

In the end, Aeriel finds that she cannot kill her darkangel because he is still beautiful, and because there is a trace of good in him. She gives up her life to save him, cutting out her heart to replace his, which the White Witch covered in lead. The duarough, Talb, who witnesses this, takes the former vampyre's (now reverted to his human name of Irrylath) heart, removes the lead, and places it into Aeriel, saving her life and making them one.

=== A Gathering of Gargoyles ===
The second book in the trilogy was published in 1985 and was a semifinalist for the ALA "Best Books for Young Adults" roster.

In the second book, Aeriel and Irrylath, the redeemed darkangel who is now Aeriel's husband, are in Esternesse, Irrylath's mother's kingdom. Aeriel should be happy, but she is not, for Irrylath shuns her, not allowing her to sleep in the same room with him or even to touch him. Into this time of grief come the maidens who were once Irrylath's other brides. They give Aeriel the second part of the rhyme that sent her questing before and send her once more into the world.

Her new quest is to find the lons, the traditional guardians of the world's kingdoms created by the Old One, Ravenna, in ancient times. Along the way, Aeriel finds the gargoyles she used to tend at Irrylath's castle, when he was the Darkangel. The gargoyles, who have been trying to protect the people of the world from the other darkangels, remember Aeriel and join her. She also meets Roshka, a prince who may be her brother, and Erin, a dark-skinned girl who refuses to be parted from her. For a time, Aeriel gets drugged and held prisoner in a castle when a nameless lord asks for her hand in marriage, due to her resemblance to his past lover, and she refuses him. Aeriel eventually reaches Terrain, the land where she was raised as a slave, to seek the advice of the sibyl of Orm. The sibyl has been killed by an agent of the White Witch, but this phony sibyl is defeated by the gargoyles and Irrylath, who has followed Aeriel. The gargoyles are revealed to be the lost lons, and they agree to go into battle against the Witch with Irrylath and his brothers. Irrylath confesses to Aeriel that he is not free to love her until the Witch is destroyed, because the Witch once made him her lover.

=== The Pearl of the Soul of the World ===
The Pearl of the Soul of the World, 1990

The final volume was published in 1990. It was named an ALA "Best Book for Young Adults" and an IRA "Young Adult's Choice" book.

In this volume, Aeriel stumbles through a cavern, nameless, voiceless and with no memory. A pin in her skull, placed there by an agent of the Witch, forces her to avoid thinking, which causes extreme pain. Found by a trio of duaroughs, Aeriel is then called to the deserted City of Crystalglass (a.k.a. NuRavennna), a stronghold of the Ancients where the mage Ravenna still lives. Ravenna heals Aeriel, who remembers how she was overpowered by the Witch's bird, who put the pin in her head. She had left camp alone after witnessing a scene between Irrylath and another woman, who was trying to convince him that Aeriel was like the Witch (a sorceress seeking to control him) and that he should love her instead. Ravenna gives Aeriel the third part of the rhyme and the final portion of her quest begins.

Ravenna tells Aeriel the truth about her world: it was merely a playground of the Ancient ones, who treated her people as slaves. The Ancients created weather machines, which are slowly running down. They abandoned the world to return to their own (Oceanus), but war and plague have since destroyed all life on Oceanus. Ravenna stayed in Aeriel's world to try to save it. She is old, and hopes to pass all her knowledge and sorcery to a successor, who will take care of the world. Her daughter is the White Witch, who turned to evil when she found out she was a "halfling" and could not go to Oceanus. Ravenna charges Aeriel with carrying a pearl filled with all her knowledge to the Witch. She must persuade the Witch to turn from evil and take up the task of saving the world. After creating the pearl, Ravenna dies.

Aeriel travels to the Witch's castle. Together they watch the battle between the Witch's forces and Irrylath's. Aeriel thinks her side is winning as the darkangels are killed. She realizes she's been duped. The Witch does not care about her army or her darkangels. She has built a chariot to take her to Oceanus; she needs to feed on souls to gain the strength to go and plans to capture Aeriel's friends after the battle. Aeriel warns her friends to flee. She hands the pearl to the Witch. Touching the pearl, the Witch is forced to realize the truth, that Oceanus is dead. She refuses the pearl's power and the task of saving the world; she says she cannot be saved because she cut out her heart and became purely evil. She dies, and the power of the pearl passes into Aeriel instead.

Aeriel falls into a flood created by the destruction of the Witch's castle. She is about to give up her last breath when Irrylath saves her, at risk to himself. Irrylath realizes that Aeriel did not know how the Witch broke him and made him serve her, nor was Aeriel seeking to control him in the same way. They finally kiss and spend time together.

Aeriel is awoken by the spirit of Ravenna, inside her. With the Witch dead, Ravenna claims that Aeriel must be the one to save the world. Ravenna's sorcery is escaping, and Aeriel must gather it up. The task will take all her energy; she must leave Irrylath. Ravenna reveals that Aeriel's body died when the Witch's pin when removed from her head. Ravenna saved her eyes, heart, mind, and soul, and built her a new body. She will live forever, unlike Irrylath. Also, one of her ancestors was also an Ancient One; there were many halflings created besides the Witch.

Aeriel does not want to leave Irrylath, but she doesn't want the world to die, either. She thinks that Irrylath only loves her because he is forced to, because she has his heart inside her. She cuts out their hearts and switches them back, so that he will be free to leave her. But when he wakes up, he still wants to be with Aeriel.

With the battle over, Irrylath's brothers and the other leaders gather. Each asks Aeriel to come to his or her land, but she turns them down, telling them to rule instead. Irrylath wants to be with Aeriel, but she must go to NuRavenna and take up her task of gathering the sorcery and saving the world. Irrylath has promised to rule over his kingdom and therefore cannot go with her. Erin, Aeriel's closest friend and "shadow," goes with Aeriel, as do the golden spirits of the thirteen original brides of Irryalth (the Darkangel).

There is a glossary of names and words, which includes a pronunciation guide for words introduced in the novel.
