= The Winter Prince =

Elizabeth Wein novel

- First edition
- Author: Elizabeth Wein
- Cover artist: Scott Multer
- Language: English
- Series: Arthurian sequence
- Genre: Young adult Fantasy novel
- Publisher: Atheneum
- Publication date: 1993
- Publication place: United States
- Media type: Print (Hardback & Paperback)
- ISBN: 978-0-689-31747-7
- OCLC: 24796419
- LC Class: PZ7.W4358 Wi 1993

The Winter Prince is Elizabeth Wein's retelling of the Arthurian story of Mordred (here Medraut), detailing Medraut's complicated, intense relationship with his legitimate half-brother Lleu.

== Plot summary ==
Medraut, the illegitimate son of Artos the king, returns from his travels in Africa and elsewhere to watch over his younger half-brother, Lleu. Though Medraut, a child of incest, can never be High King, Artos knows that Medraut is a far better statesman and fighter than his younger brother; thus, Artos gives Medraut the task of making Lleu fit to be High King, promising Medraut the position of Regent in return.

Medraut doesn't know if he loves or hates his brother; even from the beginning, he is disgusted by Lleu's naïve, careless use of power and jealous of Lleu's easy claim to Artos's affection. Their relationship intensifies when Medraut's lessons begin to stick, and Lleu starts to seem a suitable High King. Matters are further complicated by the entrance of Medraut's mother Morgause, whose disturbing similarities to Medraut are revealed even as she tries to slowly poison Lleu. Expecting Medraut's tacit approval of the poisoning, Morgause is unhappily surprised when Medraut protects Lleu and reveals Morgause's treachery to Artos. Artos banishes Morgause from the castle, and Morgause vows to erode Medraut's loyalty to Lleu.

At first, Morgause's vow seems an empty threat. But while Lleu becomes more and more competent, an accident strips Medraut of his power and (he thinks) his father's affections. Resentment simmers between Medraut and Lleu, and by the time Morgause visits again, Medraut barely needs a catalyst. He kidnaps Lleu, intending to turn him over to Morgause, who in turn, plans to trade Lleu's life for the throne. But when Lleu steals Medraut's weapons and attempts to escape, the brothers are put in a unique situation; Medraut is ill and weaponless, Lleu is completely lost, and both are stranded in the middle of the woods. Medraut, struggling with regret as well as with his own envious desire to break Lleu's spirit, proposes a sadistic bargain; if Lleu can stay awake and alert for five days straight, Medraut will betray Morgause and lead him back to Camlan. Lleu agrees to the bargain, but as Lleu begins to hallucinate from lack of sleep, Medraut realizes that nothing his brother has said or done should have pushed him to this extreme.

The book ends with Medraut carrying Lleu back to Camlan, where Lleu, in turn, invokes his power as High King to save Medraut from being punished as a traitor.

== Major themes ==
The Winter Prince deals with a number of themes, most notably jealousy and the desire for greater responsibility, the two flaws which lead Medraut to kidnap Lleu.

=== Jealousy ===
In The Winter Prince, it's not greed or ambition that drives Medraut to vie for power with his half-brother—it's jealousy. Jealousy may seem like a petty reason to align oneself politically against one's father and brother, but jealousy, personal jealousy that has not a lot to do with one's career prospects or political ambition but more to do with being loved by one's parents, is an essential part of a sibling relationship. Wein's novel illustrates the way in which small slights slowly simmer into true anger over the course of years.

Not only does jealousy figure into the relationship between Medraut and his half-brother, but also into the relationship between Morgause, Queen of the Orcades, and her brother Artos, High King.

=== Responsibility ===
In Wein's Camlan, there are many ways to distinguish oneself—one could of course go the traditional route and be an excellent swordsman, but one could also be an excellent hunter, rider, mapmaker, diplomat, farmer, or engineer. All of the above trades are portrayed as more or less equally valuable. In The Winter Prince, a high premium is placed on non-military engineering, mapmaking, or translation as skills that a good ruler should value highly. Medraut's desire for greater responsibility—portrayed in the story as a genuine desire, not a transparent grab for power—often manifests itself in these less exalted ways; Medraut manages to distinguish himself as an expert botanist and healer, and a competent miner.

The members of King Arthur's court, on the whole, are quite cosmopolitan, within the bounds of their technology and medieval time period. They know Africa exists; they know of the Romans, who bequeathed to them technological advances like the aqueduct and the arch. They're not ignorant of Greek myth, or of Christianity—which exists in tandem with the native religions of Britain. However, Medraut himself is well-travelled and his grasp of the world encompasses not only Britain and the Orcades, but other nations and other cultures as well. It is implied that, as ambassador to Africa, Medraut was given far more responsibility than he is given in Camlan, where, as Artos' illegitimate son and possible contender for the throne, he finds that people are more reluctant to trust him.
