= Firebirds (anthology) =

2003 short story anthology

- First edition cover, cover art by Cliff Nielsen
- Editor: Sharyn November
- Publisher: Firebird Books
- Publication date: September 1, 2003
- ISBN: 0-14-250142-5
- Followed by: Firebirds Rising (2006); Firebirds Soaring (2009)

Firebirds: An Anthology of Original Fantasy and Science Fiction is a 2003 anthology of short stories for young adults written by authors associated with Firebird Books. The anthology is edited by American writer Sharyn November. The American Library Association included Firebirds on their 2004 list of the Best Fiction for Young Adults.

Firebirds was followed by Firebirds Rising (2006), which was a World Fantasy Award Finalist, and Firebirds Soaring (2009).

== Contents ==
- "Introduction" by Sharyn November
- "Cotillion" by Delia Sherman
- "The Baby in the Night Deposit Box" by Megan Whalen Turner
- "Beauty" by Sherwood Smith
- "Mariposa" by Nancy Springer
- "Max Mondrosch" by Lloyd Alexander
- "The Fall of Ys" by Meredith Ann Pierce
- "Medusa" by Michael Cadnum
- "The Black Fox" by Emma Bull (adaptation) and Charles Vess (illustration)
- "Byndley" by Patricia A. McKillip
- "The Lady of the Ice Garden" by Kara Dalkey
- "Hope Chest" by Garth Nix
- "Chasing the Wind" by Elizabeth E. Wein
- "Little Dot" by Diana Wynne Jones
- "Remember Me" by Nancy Farmer
- "Flotsam" by Nina Kiriki Hoffman
- "The Flying Woman" by Laurel Winter
