= Code Name Verity =

2012 novel by Elizabeth Wein

- Cover of the 2012 Electric Monkey UK edition.
- Author: Elizabeth E. Wein
- Language: English
- Genre: Young adult fiction Historical fiction Thriller
- Publisher: Hyperion Books
- Publication date: May 15, 2012
- Publication place: United States
- Media type: Print (Hardcover)
- Pages: 451
- ISBN: 978-1423152194
- OCLC: 748286341
- LC Class: PZ7.W4358 Cp 2012
- Preceded by: The Pearl Thief
- Followed by: Rose Under Fire

Code Name Verity is a young adult historical fiction novel by Elizabeth E. Wein published in 2012. It focuses on the friendship between two young British women in World War II: a spy captured by Nazis in German-occupied France and the pilot who took her there. It was named a Michael L. Printz Honor Book in 2013, and shortlisted for the Carnegie Medal.

A loose sequel, Rose Under Fire, was published in 2013. A prequel novel, The Pearl Thief, was published in May 2017; it is a mystery involving Code Name Verity's protagonist Julie a year before the war starts.

== Plot ==
In 1943 Nazi-occupied France, a British Lysander spy plane crashes in the fictional town of Ormaie. On board are two best friends, a pilot (Maddie, code name: Kittyhawk) and a spy (Julie, code name: Verity). The latter is soon captured by Nazi authorities, detained in a former hotel, and forced to write a confession detailing the British war effort, which she decides to write in the form of a novel.

Through her confession, she tells the story of her friendship with Maddie, the pilot, and how she came to enter France in the first place. In the second part of the plot, the story is told from Maddie's point of view, and reveals the events that transpired after the plane crash that left both women in France, and her plan to find Verity and bring her back home.

In the end, Maddie kills Julie to prevent her from being tortured or sent to Natzweiler-Struthof as a specimen for medical experiments. After that, Maddie receives Julie's confession from Engel, a chemist at the hotel who has had a crisis of conscience, and she and the French Resistance use Engel’s information to blow up the hotel, which the Nazis also use as their center of operations. After that, Maddie escapes to England.

== Critical reception ==
Code Name Verity received critical acclaim. The New York Times praised it as "a fiendishly plotted mind game of a novel, the kind you have to read twice"; though saying that it might have more appeal for adults than teens, and Kirkus Reviews called it a "carefully researched, precisely written tour de force". Code Name Verity is one of five young adult novels published in 2012 to receive starred reviews in all six trade journals.

The novel won the 2013 Michael L. Printz Honor Book, the Edgar Allan Poe Award for Best Young Adult Novel, and the Golden Kite Honor in 2013. It was also shortlisted for the Carnegie Medal.
