= The Fox (Smith novel) =

2007 novel by Sherwood Smith

- First edition cover
- Author: Sherwood Smith
- Cover artist: Matt Stawicki
- Language: English
- Genre: Fantasy novel
- Publisher: DAW Books, Inc.
- Publication date: August 7, 2007
- Publication place: United States
- Media type: Hardback
- Pages: 704
- ISBN: 0-7564-0421-5
- Preceded by: Inda
- Followed by: King's Shield

The Fox is a 2007 novel by Sherwood Smith. It is continues the story of the fictional protagonist Inda.

== Overview ==
As the second son of the Prince and Princess of Choraed Elgaer, Inda was fated to protect the realm his older brother would inherit. Forced to flee his homeland before his thirteenth birthday, he finds himself on the perilous decks of a pirate ship, forcing himself never to think of all he has lost. But his military skills and inborn natural leadership ability cannot be erased, and four years later, Inda has become head of his own mercenary marine company, with a reputation for protecting merchant vessels against the marauding bands of pirates that plunder the waters.

Meanwhile, after the untimely death of Inda's brother, his parents are desperately searching for their second son—for Inda is now the heir to Choraed Elgaer.

== Characters ==
Indevan "Inda" Algara-Vayir: The second son of the Marlovan prince and princess, Jarend Algara-Vayir and Fareas Fera-Vayir. He is exiled after he is blamed for the death of his classmate and friend, Kendrend "Dogpiss" Noth. He serves aboard a trading ship before he is captured by pirates.

Savarend "Fox" Montredavan-An: The heir to Savarend Montredavan-An and Lineas Sindan-An. The Montredavan-Ans were the former royal family of the Marlovans and are exiled to their lands at Darchelde for ten generations. Their daughters cannot marry other Marlovan families and their sons are not allowed to attend the academy, but are able to go to sea. He saves Inda when his ship is attacked by pirates.

Barend Montrei-Vayir: Cousin to Evred Montrei-Vayir, he and Fox were captured by pirates and now serve as crew members.

Evred "Sponge" Montrei-Vayir: The second son to the Marlovan king, Tlennen Montrei-Vayir and his queen, Wisthia Shagal. Went to the academy with Inda. He is Aldren's future Shield Arm.

Inda's Crew: Jeje, Tau, Dasta, Gillor, Pilvig, Thog daughter of Pirog, Nugget, Mutt, Ribi the Delf
