= Rose Under Fire =

Young adult novel by Elizabeth Wein

- US hardcover cover image
- Author: Elizabeth E. Wein
- Language: English
- Genre: Young adult fiction Historical fiction
- Publisher: Electric Monkey (UK); Hyperion Books (U.S.)
- Publication date: 3 June 2013 (UK); 9 September 2013 (U.S.)
- Publication place: United States
- Media type: Print
- ISBN: 978-1405265119
- OCLC: 839315960
- Preceded by: Code Name Verity

Rose Under Fire is a young adult historical novel by Elizabeth Wein, set in World War II and published in 2013.

The novel follows Rose Justice, an 18-year-old American volunteer Air Transport Auxiliary pilot who is captured by the Luftwaffe on a flight in France in 1944, and is sent to the Ravensbrück concentration camp. Imprisoned together with Polish victims of Nazi human experimentation and Red Army prisoners of war, she survives the camp thanks to her poetry and friendship with the other captives, eventually escaping to later participate in the Hamburg Ravensbrück Trials and the Doctors' Trial against Nazi war criminals. The novel follows up Wein's previous novel Code Name Verity, and a few characters from that novel appear in Rose Under Fire.

== Critical reception ==
Rose Under Fire received positive reviews from critics.

Publishers Weekly wrote in a starred review of the novel that "Wein excels at weaving research seamlessly into narrative and has crafted another indelible story about friendship borne out of unimaginable adversity". According to Kirkus Reviews's starred review, "at the core of this novel is the resilience of human nature and the power of friendship and hope". Barrie Hardymon of NPR, comparing it to Code Name Verity, wrote that Rose Under Fire is "a quieter, less breathless read, which ultimately makes it that much more devastating."

The novel won the American Library Association's 2013 Schneider Family Book Award for "books that embody an artistic expression of the disability experience", for its portrayal of the victims of Nazi medical experimentation. It was shortlisted for the 2013 Costa Book Awards in the Children's Book category.
