= The Emerald Wand of Oz =

2005 book by Sherwood Smith

- Author: Sherwood Smith
- Illustrator: William Stout
- Cover artist: William Stout
- Language: English
- Series: The Oz books
- Genre: Children's novel Fantasy
- Publisher: HarperCollins
- Publication date: 2005
- Publication place: United States
- Media type: Print (hardcover)
- Pages: 272
- ISBN: 978-0-06-029608-7
- OCLC: 56955898
- LC Class: PZ7.S65933 Em 2005
- Preceded by: The Hidden Prince of Oz
- Followed by: Trouble Under Oz

The Emerald Wand of Oz is a 2005 book by Sherwood Smith and is a continuation of the Oz series that was started by L. Frank Baum in 1900 and continued by his many successors. The book is illustrated by William Stout and published by HarperCollins.

The novel concerns two relatives of Dorothy Gale, Em and Dory, who find themselves in Oz just as Bastinda, a new Wicked Witch of the West, threatens the citizens of Oz.

The Emerald Wand of Oz is stated to be the 46th novel entry in the series and the first of three Oz novels that have been commissioned by the Baum Family Trust. It is followed by Trouble Under Oz and Sky Pyrates Over Oz, all by Sherwood Smith.
