= Inda (novel) =

2006 novel by Sherwood Smith

- First edition cover
- Author: Sherwood Smith
- Cover artist: Matt Stawicki
- Language: English
- Genre: Fantasy novel
- Publisher: DAW Books, Inc.
- Publication date: 2006
- Publication place: United States
- Media type: Print (Hardback)
- Pages: 586, 24 cm
- ISBN: 0-7564-0264-6
- OCLC: 70833909
- Dewey Decimal: 813/.54 22
- LC Class: PS3569.M5379764 I63 2006
- Followed by: The Fox

Inda is a fantasy novel by Sherwood Smith, published in 2006. It is the first installment in a quartet of books which act as a historical prequel to Smith's other books set in Sartorias-deles, the world which she has been "writing about since [she] was eight years old". Inda's story takes place in the southern hemisphere of this planet.

A sequel to Inda, titled The Fox, was published on August 7, 2007.

== Overview ==
The country of Iasca Leror has very strong traditions about the children of noble families; the daughters of a noble house are responsible for the defence of the building and its inhabitants, and the second son is required to serve as Shield-Arm to the heir.

Indevan-Dal "Inda" Algara-Vayir is the younger son of a Marlovan prince. He is sent to the Academy to learn the art of war, the highest art of his warrior country.

Once at the Academy, life changes for Inda in possibly unexpected ways. Through determination and unexpected friendships, Inda survives until a fateful summer when one of his classmates dies and his life is changed forever. Now exiled to the sea, serving aboard a merchant sailor Indevan-Dal's life is no more and Inda's begins.

== Characters ==
Note that the second part of character surnames, here usually -Vayir, is a title of nobility.

Indevan "Inda" Algara-Vayir: The second son of the Marlovan prince and princess, Jarend Algara-Vayir and Fareas Fera-Vayir. He is Tanrid's future Shield Arm.

Tanrid Algara-Vayir: The heir to the Marlovan prince and is Inda's older brother.

Hadand Algara-Vayir: Inda and Tanrid's sister. She is betrothed to the Marlovan king's heir, Aldren Montrei-Vayir.

Evred "Sponge" Montrei-Vayir: The second son of the Marlovan king, Tlennen Montrei-Vayir, and his queen, Wisthia Shagal. Went to the Academy with Inda. He is Aldren's future Shield Arm.

Aldren Montre-Vayir: Evred's elder brother and heir to the Marlovan throne.

Barend Montre-Vayir: Cousin to Evred and Aldren, the son of Anderle Montrei-Vayir, the king's brother and Shield Arm. He is sent to sea and presumed dead when his ships are destroyed.

Kendred "Dogpiss" Noth: He went to the Academy with Inda. His death was blamed on Inda.

Landred "Cherry-Stripe" Marlo-Vayir: He went to the Academy with Inda and is the future Shield Arm to his brother, Aldren "Buck" Marlo-Vayir

Camarend "Cama" Tya-Vayir: Went to the Academy with Inda and the future Shield Arm of Stalgrid "Horsebutt" Tya-Vayir

Joret Dei: Tanrid's betrothed

Tdor Marth-Davan - Inda's betrothed

== Trivia ==
- Smith intended to release the quartet as a pair, in order to save prospective readers time and money, but found it unworkable. This is why the book ends somewhat abruptly.
