= Sherwood Smith =

American novelist

- Born: May 28, 1951 (age 74) Glendale, California, U.S.
- Occupation: Author, retired teacher
- Education: University of Southern California (BA); University of California, Santa Barbara (MA)
- Genre: Fantasy, science fiction, historical romance

Website
- sherwoodsmith.net

Sherwood Smith (born May 29, 1951) is an American fantasy and science fiction writer for young adults and adults. Smith is a Nebula Award finalist and a longtime writing group organizer and participant.

Smith's works include the YA novel Crown Duel. Smith also collaborated with Dave Trowbridge in writing the Exordium series and with Andre Norton in writing two of the books in the Solar Queen universe.

In 2001, her short story "Mom and Dad at the Home Front" was a finalist for the Nebula Award for Best Short Story. Smith's children's books have made it on many library Best Books lists. Her Wren's War was an Anne Spencer Lindbergh Honor Book, and it and The Spy Princess were Mythopoeic Fantasy Award finalists. Smith was formerly an officer of the Mythopoeic Society under her birth name, Christine Ione Smith, but prefers "Sherwood" both personally and professionally.

== Biography ==
Sherwood Smith was born May 28, 1951, in Glendale, California. On her website, Smith describes herself as a middle-aged woman who has been married for over thirty years. Besides writing, she taught part-time at an elementary school, though she is now retired. She has "two kids, rescue dogs, and a house full of books."

Smith began making books out of taped paper towels when she was five years old. When she was 8, she started writing about another world, Sartorias-deles, though she soon switched to making comic books of her stories, which she found to be easier. Although she first tried to send out her novels when she was 13, nothing sold. However, some of the novels Smith first wrote as a teen, including Wren to the Rescue, were sold after she learned to rewrite.

In the years it took her to learn to rewrite, Smith "went to college, lived in Europe, came back to get [her] masters in History, worked in Hollywood, got married, started a family and became a teacher." She received her degrees from the University of Southern California (B.A.) in 1973 and the University of California, Santa Barbara (M.A.) in 1977. In 2010 she became a member of Book View Cafe.

Smith currently resides in California.

== Partial bibliography ==
Smith has co-written The Change Series with Rachel Manija Brown.

=== Books written under other pseudonyms ===
Smith has written some of the books in the Planet Builders series as Robyn Tallis. She has also written four books in the Nowhere High series as Jesse Maguire and one book in the Horror High series as Nicholas Adams.

=== Novels ===
==== Wren books ====
- Wren to the Rescue (1990), reissued by Firebird Books (2004) e-book Book View Cafe
- Wren's Quest (1993), reissued by Firebird Books (2004)
- Wren's War (1995), reissued by Firebird Books (2004)
- Wren Journeymage (2010) Book View Cafe
- A Posse of Princesses (March 2008) Norilana Books, e-book corrected, extra chapter (2011) Book View Cafe
- Barefoot Pirate (2011) Book View Cafe
- Lhind the Thief (2013) Book View Cafe

==== Sartorias-deles ====
Sartorias-deles is the name of the fictitious world that is the setting for many of the books by Sherwood Smith. It is one of four inhabited planets in the Erhal system. According to Smith, humans first arrived on Sartorias-deles through world gates untold millennia ago. Occasionally, still more humans arrive. However, in non-canon commentaries the author informs readers that most of the early human history on Sartorias-deles has been lost since the so-called Fall of Sartor approximately 4,000 years before the events of the books such as Senrid. Smith does indeed appear to intend these humans be portrayed as having been Terrans prior to their immigration to the Erhal system. For example, in numerous references throughout the stories, they appear to have brought with them several domesticated animal species, including cattle, horses, and dogs, as well as many foods such as coffee, rice, the tomato, and concepts such as the seven-day week.

- A Stranger to Command (2008), prequel to Crown Duel telling the story of Shevraeth's training
- Crown Duel (1997–1998), previously published in two parts as Crown Duel and Court Duel. Issued in a single volume by Firebird Books in 2002, an e-book in 2010, with additions of scenes from Vidanric's point of view
- Inda (August 2006) DAW Books
- The Fox (August 2007) (sequel to Inda)
- King's Shield (July 2008) (sequel to The Fox)
- Treason's Shore (July 2009) (sequel to King's Shield)
- Banner of the Damned (April 2012) (set 400 years after Inda quartet)
- Sasharia En Garde (July 2015), Book View Cafe.
- Senrid (May 2015) Book View Cafe
- The Trouble With Kings (February 2015) Book View Cafe
- Over the Sea: CJ Notebook One (2007) Norilana, e-book (2010) Book View Cafe
- Mearsies Heili Bounces Back: CJ Notebook Two (2008) Norilana, e-book (2010) Book View Cafe
- Poor World: CJ Notebook Four (2011) Book View Cafe
- Fleeing Peace (March 2011) Book View Cafe
- The Spy Princess (August 2012) Viking
- Sartor (Sequel to The Spy Princess (August 2012) Book View Cafe
- A Sword Named Truth (2019) (Rise of the Alliance book 1)
- The Blood Mage Texts (2021) (Rise of the Alliance book 2)
- The Hunters and the Hunted (2022) (Rise of the Alliance book 3)
- Nightside of the Sun (2022) (Rise of the Alliance book 4)

Other:

- Coronets and Steel (September 2010) DAW Books
- Blood Spirits (September 2011) DAW Books
- Revenant Eve (September 2012) DAW Books
- Danse de la Folie (September 2012) Book View Cafe
- Rondo Allegro (September 2014) Book View Cafe
- Atlanta Nights (January 2005) (first chapter only, and under the pseudonym of Travis Tea)

==== Exordium ====
- The Phoenix in Flight (1993) (with Dave Trowbridge reissued in a second edition as e-book, 2011)
- Ruler of Naught (1993) (with Dave Trowbridge reissued in a second edition as e-book, 2011)
- A Prison Unsought (1994) (with Dave Trowbridge)
- The Rifter's Covenant (1995) (with Dave Trowbridge)
- The Thrones of Kronos (1996) (with Dave Trowbridge)

==== Andre Norton's Solar Queen universe ====
- Derelict for Trade (1997) (with Andre Norton)
- A Mind for Trade (1997) (with Andre Norton)

==== Andre Norton's Time Traders universe ====
- Echoes in Time (1999)
- Atlantis Endgame (2002)

==== Oz series ====
- The Emerald Wand of Oz (2005), first in a new continuation of Oz books by L. Frank Baum
- Trouble Under Oz (2006)
- Sky Pyrates Over Oz (2014)

==== Planet Builders Series ====
- Rebel from Alphorion (1989), known as Robyn Tallis
- Visions from the Sea (1989), known as Robyn Tallis
- Giants of Elenna (1989), known as Robyn Tallis
- Fire in the Sky (1989), known as Robyn Tallis

==== TV tie-in novels ====
- The Borrowers (1997), novelization of the screenplay by Scott and John Kamps, Harcourt
- Journey to Otherwhere (2000), Voyage of the Basset series, book 3
- Augur's Teacher (2001), based on the TV show Earth: Final Conflict

=== Short stories ===
- "Monster Mash" (1988), in Werewolves anthology
- "Ghost Dancers" (1989), in Things That Go Bump in the Night anthology
- "Faith" (1993), in A Wizard's Dozen anthology
- "Curing the Bozos" (1994), in Bruce Coville's Book of Aliens anthology
- "Echoes of Ancient Danger" (1995), in Orphans of the Night anthology
- "I Was A Teen-Age Superhero" (1995) in Starfarer's Dozen anthology
- "Daria's Window" (1996), in Sisters in Fantasy II anthology
- "What's A Little Fur Among Friends?" (1996), in Bruce Coville's Book of Spinetinglers anthology
- "Visions" (1996), in Bruce Coville's Book of Magic anthology
- "Illumination" (1996), in Nightmare's Dozen anthology
- "And Horses are Born With Eagles' Wings" (1997), in Realms of Fantasy Magazine
- "Mastery" (1997), in Wizard Fantastic anthology
- "And Now Abideth These Three..." (1998), in Realms of Fantasy Magazine
- "Finding the Way" (1999), in Alien Visitors anthology
- "Mom and Dad at the Home Front" (2000), in Realms of Fantasy Magazine, Year's Best Fantasy ed. David Hartwell, and New Magics ed. Patrick Nielsen Hayden
- "Excerpts from the Diary of a Henchminion" (2000), in Faeries magazine (French)
- "Beauty" (2003), in Firebirds anthology
- "Court Ship" (2008), in Firebirds Soaring anthology
- "Commando Bats" in Athena's Daughters anthology
- "Zapped" (2015), A Tor.com Original
