= Wren to the Rescue =

1990 novel by Sherwood Smith

- First edition
- Author: Sherwood Smith
- Language: English
- Series: Wren series
- Genre: Fantasy
- Published: 1990 (Harcourt Books)
- Publication place: United States
- Media type: Print (hardback 1990 & paperback 1993, 2004)
- Pages: 216 (first edition, hardback)
- ISBN: 978-0-15-200975-5 (first edition, hardback)
- Preceded by: A Posse of Princesses (2008)
- Followed by: Wren's Quest (1993)

Wren to the Rescue is a novel by Sherwood Smith, which she first wrote in high school in the mid-1960s under the name Tess's Mess. Described are the adventures of the title character, Wren, a female human orphan whose best friend Tess is revealed to be the princess of a neighbouring country. When Tess is kidnapped, Wren races to her rescue, making friends with students from a Magic School and learning about her own talents along the way. As part of her adventure, Wren is transformed bodily into a dog, and must decide whether to abandon her quest or try to turn her new shape to the advantage, at great risk of losing her human identity in the process.

== Plot summary ==
Wren to the Rescue tells the story of an orphan girl who learns her best friend and purportedly fellow-orphan Tess, is in fact Teresa Rhisadel, princess and sole heiress of the neighbouring country of Meldrith.

Tess then reveals her hiding is due to a curse from Andreus, the self-styled king of the nearby nation of Senna Lirwan.

In hopes that after twelve years Andreus has lost interest in his threat of revenge, and out of their ceaseless desire to be reunited with their daughter, Tess's regal parents have sought her return home to Cantirmoor, capital of Meldrith, and have given Tess permission to invite Wren to accompany her.

The plan backfires, however; when the girls are resting in Cantirmoor, the subterfuge of a Lirwani agent succeeds in abducting Tess.

In the ensuing confusion, Wren is largely forgotten by the Cantirmoor officials. In frustration and wanting to help Tess, Wren slips away to the Cantirmoor Magic School, which already had been a waypoint of the trip to the palace from the orphanage. There Wren meets a magic prentice, Tyron, whose own plan to rescue Tess she joins.

The pair rides to the Free Vale, a magically protected Free Haven located south of Cantirmoor. Tyron intends to seek the aid of Idres Rhiscarlan, an inhabitant of the Free Vale, to rescue Tess. Idres’ reluctance due to past animosities between her and Tess’ father prevails, however, and the most she aids them is to discuss an approach to Andreus’ mountain-encircled land. At the next major stop on their journey of rescue, Horth Falls Town, Wren and Tyron encounter another prominent sympathizer to the Princess’ plight, Connor Shaltar, also technically a prince of another land, whose provisions breath new hope into the mission.

The international scope of the conflict becomes clear as debate over a retaliatory invasion against Senna Lirwan heightens in Cantirmoor, ad interim Wren's rescue party faces an escalating variety of threats as they make their way into, in to, and through, the border mountains.

Once on the Lirwani side, some transmogrification is the only thing which saves Wren from the ambush-laden land's defenses. This magical intervention proves to be provided by an unexpected ally, whose previous rescue of the rescuers went anonymous.

Her compatriots being overrun and captured by the intensifying security measures on the planes of Andreus’ blighted land, Wren is able narrowly to escape, still being in animal form herself. Wren defies the directive of hastening home to be restored human before her mind is lost forever, instead electing to expand her rescue mission to include all of her friends now bound in the highest tower of Edrann.

Through a combination of infiltration and the magic ability of her friends, all six foreign detainees win free.

The book ends with two of the planet’s most prestigious magicians setting off on a mission to bring Andreus’s educator to justice, while the former's position in control of Senna Lirwan remains all-too-secure.

== Characters ==
- Wren: A young orphan raised in Three Groves Orphanage, friend of Princess Teressa. Wren is described as strong-willed and spunky.
- Tyron: Young Apprentice Magician trying to help Wren save Teressa.
- Connor Shaltar: Half-uncle of Princess Teressa. Due to his heritage, he is able to communicate with animals.
- Teressa (Tess) Rhisadel: Princess of Meldrith. She was raised at an orphanage with Wren to protect her from King Andreus of Senna Lirwan.
- Verne and Arstren Rhisadel: Parents of Teressa, King and Queen of Meldrith. Arstren is the older sister of Prince Connor.
- Andreus: King of Senna Lirwan; he has a long-standing grudge against the rulers of Meldrith.
- Idres Rhiscarlan: Aloof and cynical penultimate surviving member of her family, ostracized by self and by others from most of society, and a resident of the Free Vale, she declares her neutrality in all matters concerning Verne Risadel and Andreus; nevertheless, she may yet aid in the quest to rescue Tess, for Idress has no gladness to see Andreus targeting a child in his schemes.
- Halfrid: King Verne's head mage.

== Nations ==
- Meldrith: Centrally located, powerful, and just nation whence Tess and her father hail.
- Siradayel: Somewhat-northern, powerful, peaceful nation in which both central protagonists begin the story.
- Senna Lirwan: Coastal, but mountain-encircled, nation ruled by the primary antagonist, king Andreus.

== Human settlements ==
- Three Groves, small hill town in Siradayel
- Cantirmoor, large capital city of Meldrith
- Free Haven, Meldrith, a collection of residences spaced at considerable distance and shielded by magic against people with ill will toward the inhabitants.
- Horth Falls town, Meldrith
- Edran, fortress-city capital of Senna Lirwan
