= European hand fans in the 18th century =

Hand fans first arrived in Europe in the 15th century from Asia and became popular in the 16th century. Several fan styles were common and a plethora of materials were used to create them. Subject matter varied greatly, from Biblical scenes to landscapes. Hand fans serve as a cooling mechanism, social instrument, and fashion accessory.

== History ==
Fans were used throughout history, and can be traced back as long as five thousand years ago. They developed in ancient Egypt, India and China, where they were used for ceremonies and practical purposes. In the 12th century, during the Crusades, the fan was brought to Europe. At first, Europeans adopted the rigid fan and feather fans. Queen Elizabeth I of England (1533–1603) owned dozens of these fans, as was shown in her portraits. Later in the 16th century, folding fans were introduced into Europe from Japan where they originated.

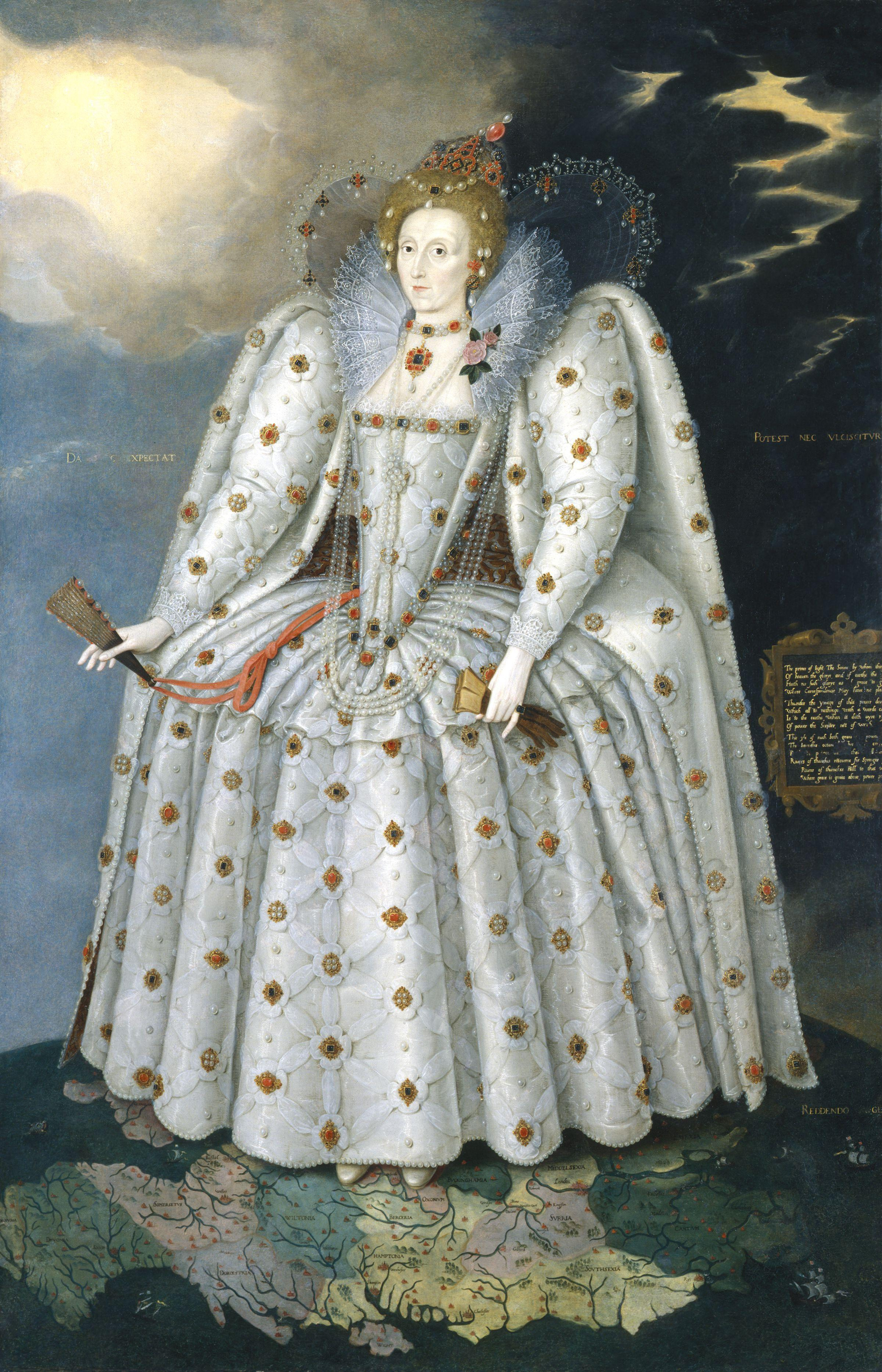
Queen Elizabeth I ('The Ditchley portrait') by Marcus Gheeraerts the Younger

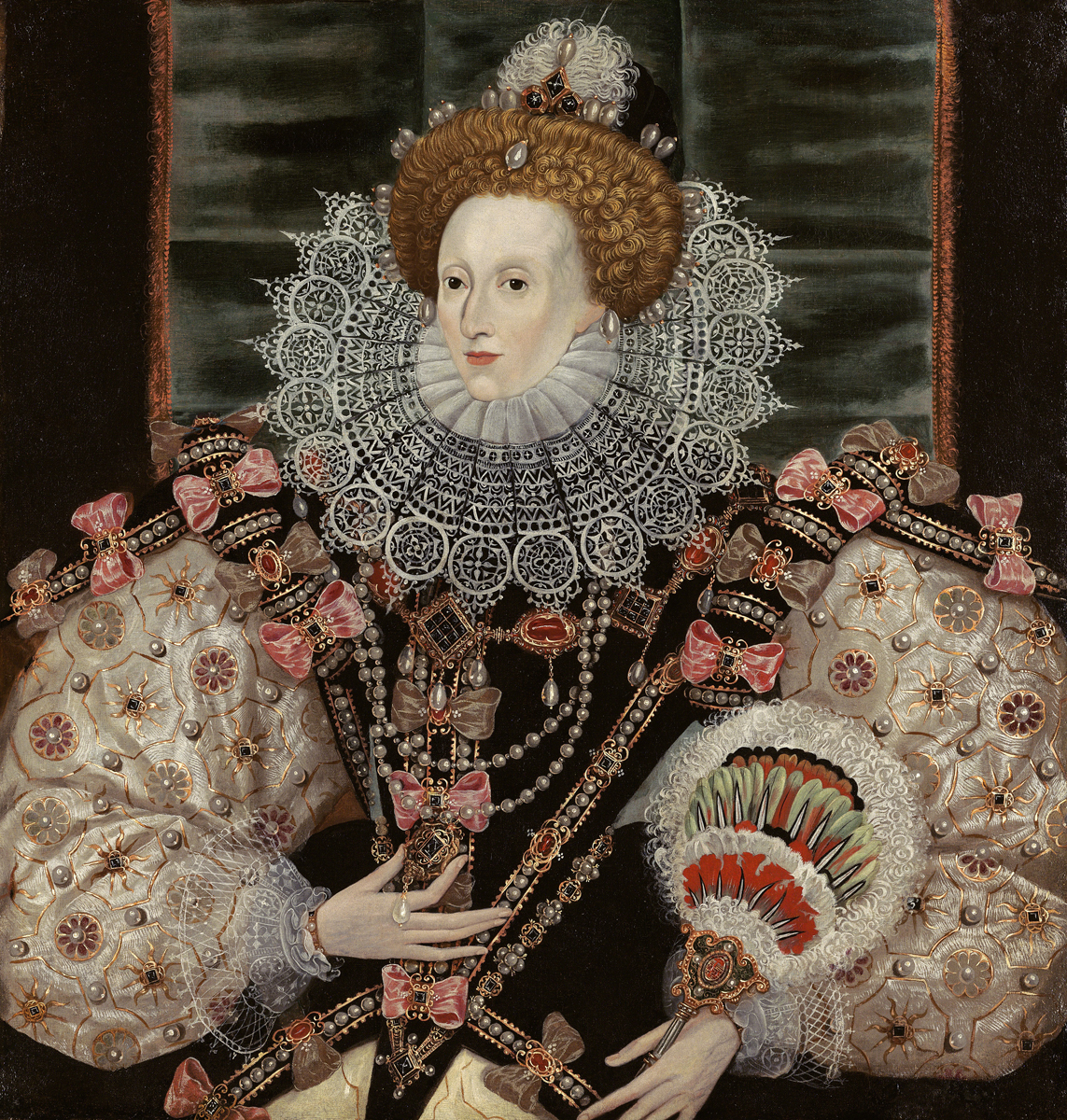
Elizabeth I George Gower

Once the fan was known to Europe, France became the center for fan design and production. At the end of the 17th century, Huguenot immigrants traveled to England, bringing the fan craft with them. French fans were so popular that they were smuggled into England during the 18th century. During this time the Worshipful Company of Fan Makers tried to grow the English fan trade, but their success was small in comparison to the French industry.

== Types ==
There were two main types of fans seen in Europe during the 18th century: the rigid (or fixed) fan and the folding fan.

=== Rigid fan ===
As its name implies, the rigid fan is stiff and is made to retain its shape. Possible fan shapes are a leaf, a rectangle, or an oval. The fan is attached to a base where it is held.

=== Folding fan ===
The folding fan was the most popular in Europe during the 18th century, a time known as the golden age of the folding fan. The principal folding fan styles are pleated, brisé, and cockade.

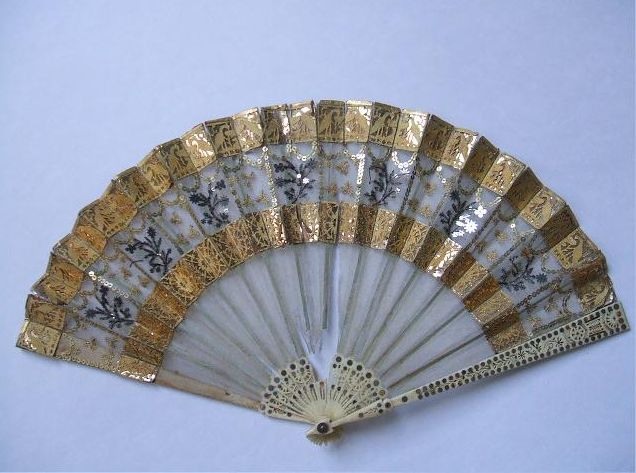
Hand fan 1800 1805

==== Pleated fan ====
The pleated fan consists of a mount and a set of sticks. The outer sticks (the guards) are wider than the others and are often more decorated. At the base of the sticks is a pivot which connects the fan and allows it to spread and open. The base is either shaped or rounded off.

==== Brisé fan ====
The brisé fan consists only of a set of sticks. These sticks are attached to a base with a pivot similar to that of a pleated fan. A cord or ribbon runs across the top of the fan, holding the sticks together.

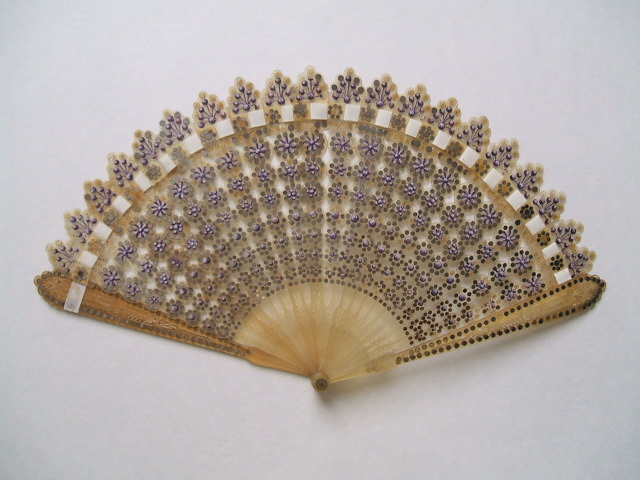
Hand fan 1815 1820

==== Cockade fan ====
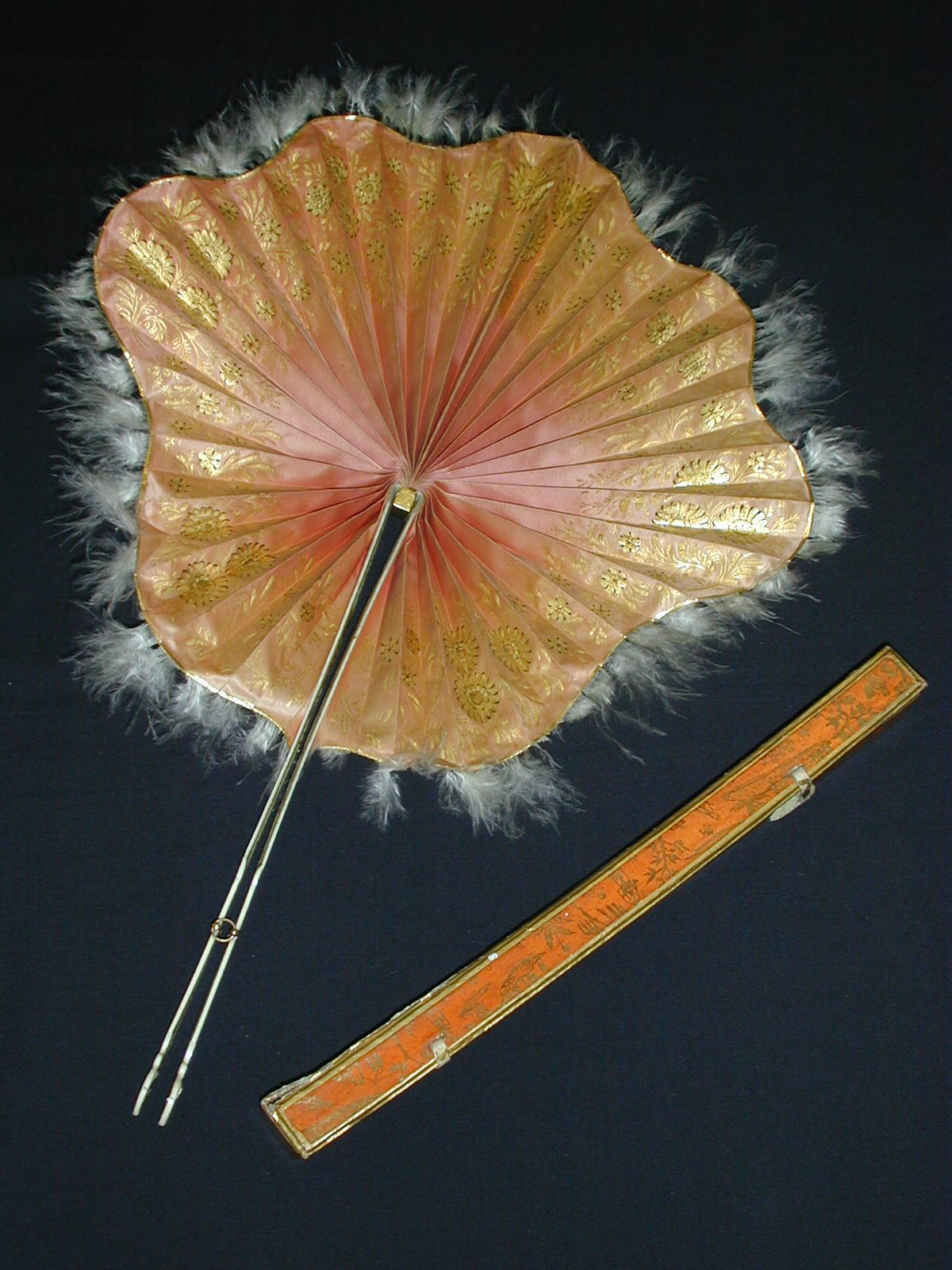
A Parisian Cockade fan of silk and ivory, 1800-1850

A cockade fan opens into a complete circle around the pivot. Their style can be either pleated or brisé. They were not very practical and considered too flamboyant, and thus they saw little popularity.

== Materials ==
Fans in the 18th century were made from a wide variety of materials depending on their style and purpose. During the 18th century fans were a fashion accessory and thus were made from the fashionable materials of the time.

=== Sticks and handles ===
Sticks and handles could be made of gold, tortoise shell, ivory, mother-of-pearl, horn, or wood. They were often highly decorated. Most sticks and handles were not only made of the previously listed materials, but were inlaid with others. For example, a mother-of-pearl fan could be inlaid with gold. Other sticks were plain.

=== Mounts ===
Previous to 1780, mounts were typically made of vellum or paper. Some, more valuable fans were decorated with materials used for the sticks such as mother-of-pearl. Other decorations included feathers, butterfly wings, silk, gold, and sequins. Although not as common, the 18th century also saw lace fans.

== Subject matter ==
European fans were often decorated with historical, political, or social images. While some fans were meant to inform, others were meant to entertain. There was fan for every occasion; whether it be a wedding, a funeral, or a dance, there was always a fan made specifically for the event.

=== Entertainment ===
Some artists designed fans which would prevent boredom during a dull event, or would start a conversation. These fans were often covered with riddles and puzzles. Another type of entertainment fan was the fortune-telling fan. These presented questions such as “Whether one is to get Riches; Whether one will be successful in Love; What sort of Husband shall I have; etc.”

=== Instructive ===
The 18th century saw fans which assisted in remembering holidays or that served as maps. The fan, “Map of Warwickshire” is such a fan.

=== Historical ===
Fans commonly recorded current events. There were souvenir fans that depicted scenes such as Vesuvius erupting and the Coliseum. Others celebrated public events such as a military victory. The fan, “Coronation of George II” shows the banquet of George II and Queen Caroline in Westminster Hall on their coronation day, October 11, 1727.

=== Biblical and classical ===
Classical myths and biblical scenes were frequent during the early 18th century. Fans for church depicted Bible subjects such as Jacob and Rachel or Ruth and Boaz. The fan, “Moses Striking the Rock” shows the Israelite encampment in the wilderness and Moses standing by the rock from which water flows.

=== Pastoral ===
Later in the 18th century, rococo pastoral scenes became popular. Landscapes were common as well as images with love and courtship themes. Cupid was often a principal figure on such fans. The fan, “Pastoral Landscape” shows a river landscape with men and women walking by and sheep grazing.

== Purposes ==
=== Practical ===
When originated, the fan’s purpose was to cool the face and keep away insects. Before the 18th century their most common use was to keep flies away from church altars. While driving insects away became less and less of a fan’s purpose, the fan continued to serve as a cooling mechanism.

=== Fashion ===
In Europe, fans were not a necessity. They were mainly used as a fashion accessory, to complement the rest of the lady’s outfit. “Fans were as much an adjunct to a lady of fashion’s attire as were gloves or bags.” By the 18th century fans were used only by females. The fan was described as the “feminine accessory, par excellence.”

=== Propaganda ===
Subject matter such as historical and political events made fans a means of spreading news or political propaganda. Other fans contained brand names and store fronts and thus acted as advertisements.

=== Social instrument – fan language ===
Due to their large use and popularity, fans began to affect gestures and thus a fan “sign language” developed between 1711 and 1740. In a 1740 edition of the Gentleman's Magazine, there was an advertisement for “The New Fashioned Speaking FAN!” This “speaking fan” created a system whereby motions of the fan translated into letters of the alphabet. The alphabet, with the exception of J, was split into five sections. These sections corresponded to one of the following movements:

1. Moving the fan with the left hand to the left arm
2. Moving the fan with the right hand to the left arm
3. Placing the fan against the bosom
4. Raising the fan to the mouth
5. Raising the fan to the forehead

In order to signal a letter two movements were necessary. The first corresponded to one of the five alphabet groups, and the second told the letter’s position in the group. For example, to signal “D”, one would use movement 1 (first section of the alphabet), followed by movement 4 (fourth letter in that section of the alphabet).

== Current status ==
Fans are often considered minor works of art. Many survived and are in the hands of owners or museums throughout the world.
