= Sharyn November =

American writer and editor

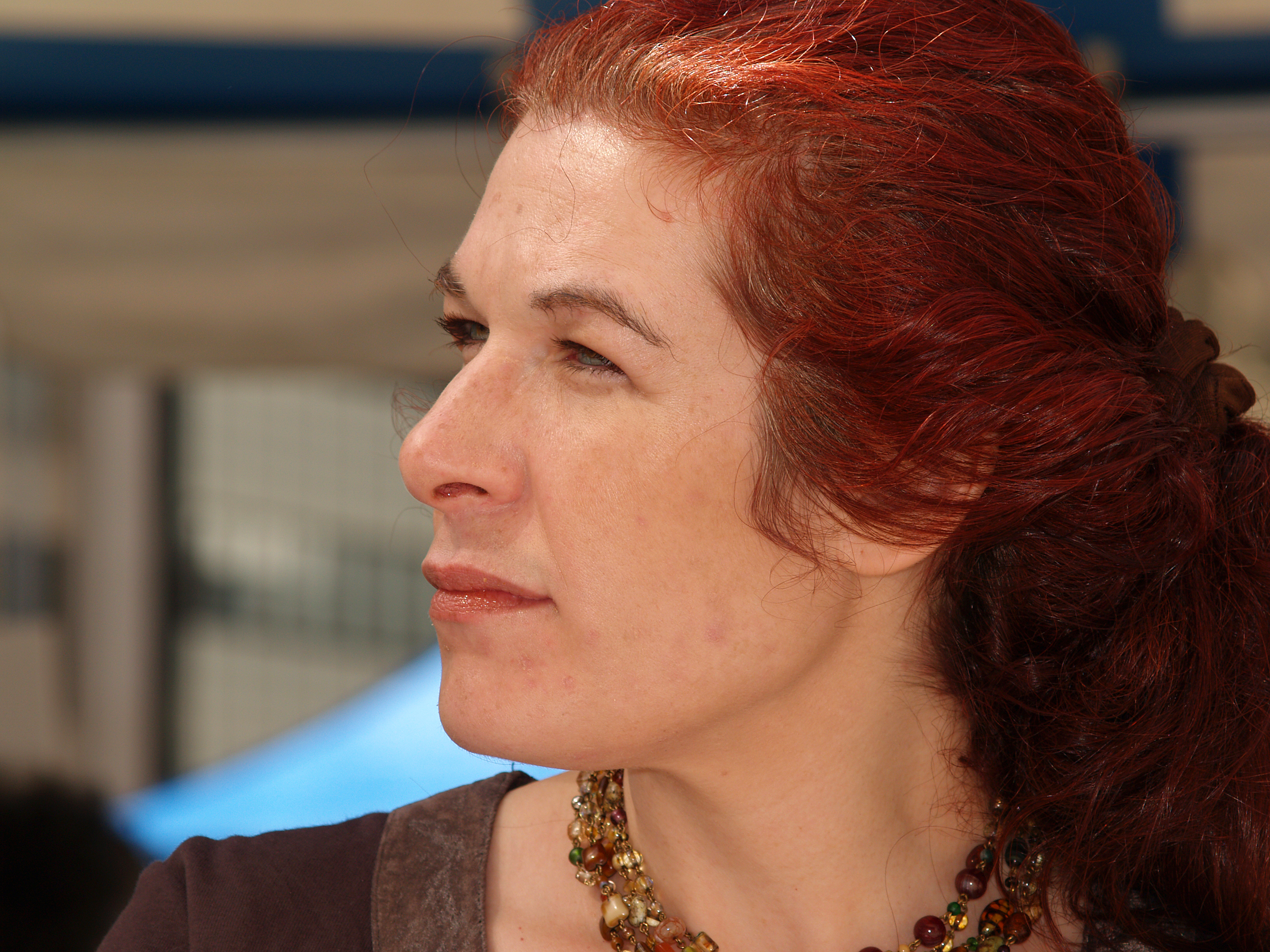
- Sharyn November at the 2007 Brooklyn Book Festival
- Born: New York, U.S.
- Occupation: Novelist

Sharyn November is an American writer and an editor of books for children and teenagers. Until March 2016 she was Senior Editor for Viking Children's Books and Editorial Director of Firebird Books, which is a mainly paperback (reprint) imprint publishing fantasy and science fiction for teenagers and adults.

== Biography ==
November was born in New York. She graduated from Sarah Lawrence College after studying poetry; at 21 she was awarded a scholarship to the Bread Loaf Writers’ Conference. She has been published in several magazines.

After working as a secretary, she became an editor, starting her career at Penguin in 1990 at Puffin Books as an associate editor. She became Senior Editor there, responsible for acquiring reprint rights, as well as Senior Editor at Viking Children's Books, responsible for editing hardcover fiction and non-fiction.

She is one of the few children's book editors who works directly with teenagers; their love of speculative fiction was the seed of her founding Firebird Books, which launched in January 2002. She has been a member of the board of the United States Board on Books for Young People and the National Council of Teachers of English’s Assembly on Literature for Adolescents, as well as a member of several committees of the American Library Association. She was named a 2004 and 2005 World Fantasy Award Finalist in the Professional category—in 2004 for Firebird Books, in 2005 for editing. Firebirds Rising was a 2007 Finalist in the Anthology category.

In March 2016 Viking announced that November's position was to be eliminated.

== Bibliography ==
- Firebirds: An Anthology of Original Fantasy and Science Fiction (editor) (2003)
- Firebirds Rising: An Anthology of Original Science Fiction and Fantasy (editor) (2006)
- Firebirds Soaring: An Anthology of Original Speculative Fiction (editor) (2009)
