= Meredith Ann Pierce =

American novelist

- Born: July 5, 1958 (age 68); Seattle, Washington, U.S.
- Education: University of Florida
- Writing career
- Genre: Speculative fiction
- Website: www.moonandunicorn.com

Meredith Ann Pierce (born July 5, 1958, in Seattle, Washington) is an American fantasy writer and librarian. Her books deal in fantasy worlds with mythic settings and frequently feature young women who first wish only to love and be loved, yet who must face hazard and danger to save their way of life, their world, and so on, usually without being respected for their efforts until the end of the story.

== Career ==
Her first book started a trilogy often referred to as The Darkangel Trilogy. Published in 1982, The Darkangel featured a story that Pierce claims came to her all at once while she read the account of a dream recounted to Carl Jung, one of the fathers of psychiatry. It was followed in 1984 by A Gathering of Gargoyles, and concluded in 1990 with The Pearl of the Soul of the World. These books told the story of a slave girl who finds herself trying to kill a darkangel to avenge his kidnapping of her mistress. She then finds herself forced to care for the thirteen wraiths who were once his beautiful and unwilling brides, and must also resist the attractions of the vampyre. As she makes her way through the books, she finds more and more responsibility laid on her slender shoulders, with few friends and much danger as well.

Pierce's second and more popular trilogy, The Firebringer Trilogy, involved a tribe of unicorns on a different fantasy world. It started with Birth of the Firebringer in 1985, continued in Dark Moon, published in 1992, and ended with The Son of Summer Stars in 1996. Jan, the hero of the trilogy, is part messiah, part King Arthur-figure. All three books were re-printed by Firebird Books in 2003.

Pierce has written other fantasy novels, which are frequently published as either Young Adult Fiction or as general Fantasy, and sometimes in each category. Her most recent book, Waters Luminous and Deep, is a book of short stories marketed for adults.

== Books ==
=== The Darkangel Trilogy ===
- 1982 The Darkangel
  - Won International Reading Association Children's Book Award
  - Won California Young Reader Medal
- 1985 A Gathering of Gargoyles
- 1990 The Pearl of the Soul of the World

=== The Firebringer Trilogy ===
- 1985 Birth of the Firebringer
- 1992 Dark Moon
- 1996 The Son of Summer Stars

=== Other books ===
- 1985 The Woman Who Loved Reindeer
- 1988 Where the Wild Geese Go - a picture book
- 2001 Treasure at the Heart of the Tanglewood
- 2004 Waters Luminous and Deep - a book of short fiction
