= Firebird Books =

Imprint of the Penguin Group USA since 2002

- Parent company: Penguin Young Readers Group (Penguin Group)
- Founded: 2002
- Founder: Sharyn November
- Country of origin: United States
- Headquarters location: New York City
- Publication types: Books
- Official website: www.firebirdbooks.com

Firebird Books (launched January 2002) is an imprint of Penguin Group (USA) Inc., publishing mainly paperback reprint editions of science fiction and fantasy for teenagers and adults.

It was created by Sharyn November, one of the few children's book editors who works with teenagers. In the process, she discovered that some of her best readers loved speculative fiction, and were going into the adult genre sections of bookstores and libraries in order to find it.

Firebird has quickly become the most recognizable imprint of its kind, and Sharyn November was named a World Fantasy Award Finalist in both 2004 and 2005 for her work. Firebirds Rising, the second anthology November edited for the imprint, is a 2007 World Fantasy Award Finalist.

"Firebirds", the first anthology, consists of short sci-fi/fantasy stories by the likes of Lloyd Alexander, Emma Bull, Charles Vess, Michael Cadnum, Kara Dalkey, Nancy Farmer, Nina Kiriki Hoffman, Diana Wynne Jones, Patricia A. McKillip, Garth Nix, Meredith Ann Pierce, Delia Sherman, Sherwood Smith, Nancy Springer, Megan Whalen Turner, Elizabeth E. Wein, and Laurel Winter.
