= Book View Café =

Publishing cooperative

Book View Café is an author-owned, all-volunteer publishing cooperative that produces and sells ebooks and provides an online book community.

Founded in 2008 with a group of 27 published American authors, including Ursula LeGuin, Vonda McIntyre and Seanan McGuire, the organization provides 90% of its earnings to their contributing authors. Co-op members each provides skills in return for the contributions needed to publish their books, which allows the group to offer the functions of traditional publishers, such as editing, formatting, typesetting, cover designing, accounting, web designing, technology support, legal consulting, and public relations. E-books are released directly through Kindle and Sony's e-reader and via the Book View Café website.

In 2012 they began to sell ebooks directly to libraries, aiming to work with Smashwords to supply books on Baker & Taylor's Axis 360 platform and to OverDrive. Book View Café offers new titles as well as backlist titles. The publisher produces books in multiple genres, including fantasy, science fiction, horror, romance, humor, mystery, historical, teen and young adult books, as well as memoirs.
