= Decorations of Azad Hind =

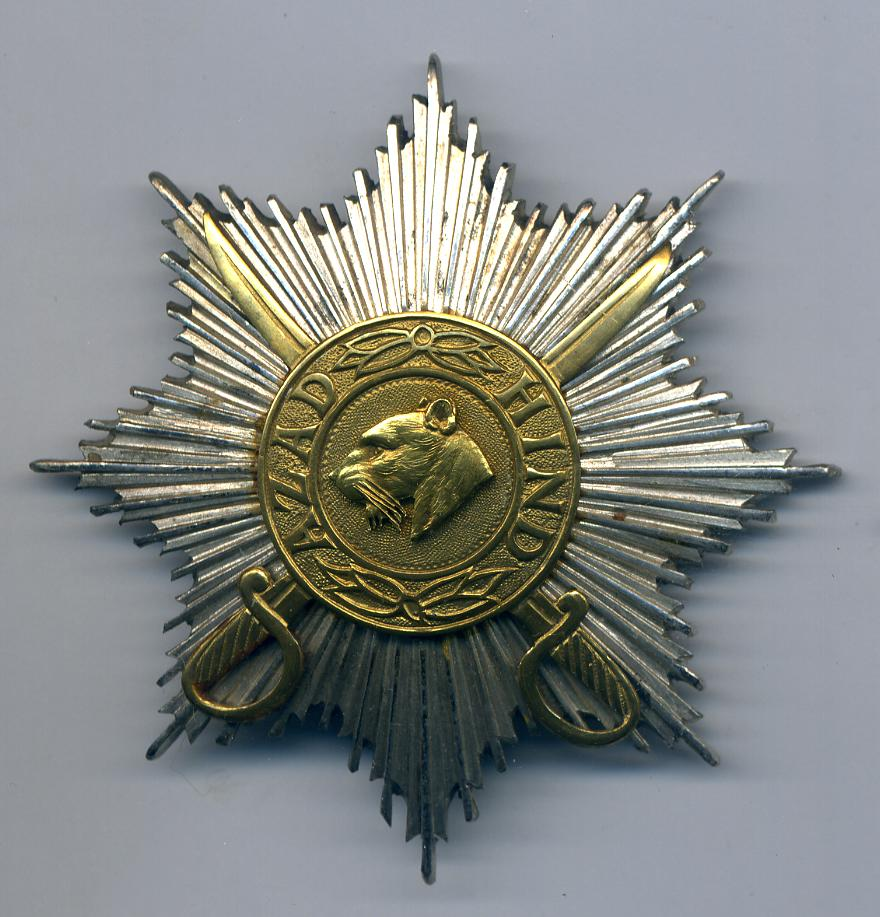
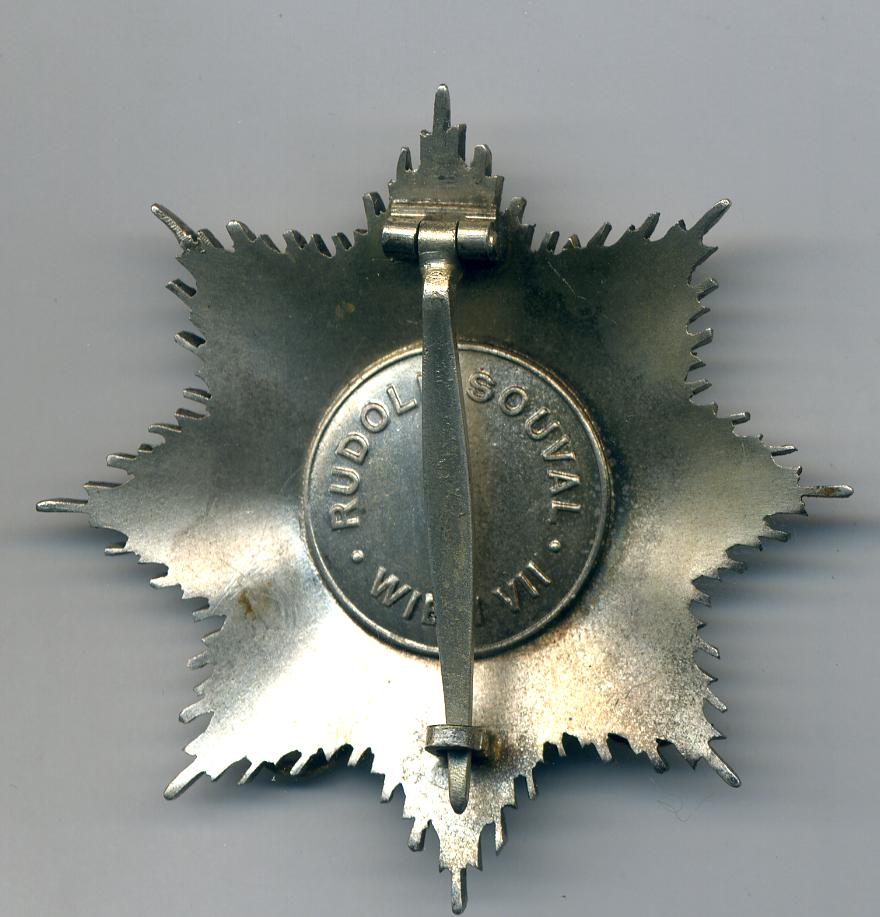
Azad Hind Award with Swords

The decorations of Azad Hind were instituted by Subhas Chandra Bose while in Nazi Germany, initially for the Indian Legion, to be awarded for gallantry in the field of battle. Both Indians and Germans were eligible for the decorations. Later, the same awards were instituted by the Azad Hind provisional government for the Indian National Army during its campaign in South-East Asia.

== Sher-e-Hind ==
The Grand Star "Sher-e-Hind" (Tiger of India), was a neck order/medal and could be conferred with swords for valour in combat, and without swords for non-combat awards. At least three award were made, to Captain Baru Singh, Captain Ganeshi Lal, and Captain Kanwal Singh.

== Sardar-e-Jung ==
The second highest military decoration by the awarded by the Azad Hind Government was the Sardar-e-Jung (Leader of Battle), which was a 1st Class Star. The award was a Badge, and could be conferred with swords for valour in combat, and without swords for non-combat awards. At least five awards were made, one to Colonel Shaukat Malik for the capture of Moirang, to Captain Shangara Singh Mann and to Lieutenant Kunwar Balwant Singh for capturing British Army Post at Modak. Captain Mann was also awarded the Vir-e-Hind medal. Colonel Pritam Singh was awarded Sardar-e-jung, he captured a hill named Pritam Hill in Burma and Palel Airport, Major Pitri Sharan Raturi was awarded for Battle of Kaladan.

== Vir-e-Hind ==
The Vir-e-Hind (Warrior of India) was the 2nd Class Star and third in order. This award was a medal, and like those higher than it, the award could be conferred with swords for valour in combat, and without swords for non-combat awards. At least one award was made, to Captain Shangara Singh Mann. He was also awarded the Sardar-e-Jung.

== Shahid-e-Bharat ==
The Shahid-e-Bharat (Martyr for India) was a medal to fallen soldiers. It was awarded in gold or in silver and was only awarded with swords.

== Tamgha-e-Bahaduron ==
The soldier's gallantry medal.

== See also ==
- Former Indian National Army Monument
