= Battles and operations of the Indian National Army =

Battles and operations involving the Indian National Army (INA) during the Second World War took place in the South-East Asian theatre in the South-East Asian theatre. The INA’s involvement spanned espionage activities during the Malayan campaign in 1942, participation in the Japanese Ha-Go and U-Go offensives in the Upper Burma and Manipur, and later defensive engagements during the Allied Burma campaign.

The INA’s counterpart in Europe, the Indische Legion, saw limited deployment. Although it participated in duties along the Atlantic Wall and was involved in special operations in Persia and Afghanistan, as well as a small deployment in Italy, its overall military role remained minor.

While the INA was not considered a significant conventional military threat, it though not a significant conventional military threat, the INA posed a substantial strategic concern—particularly for the British Indian Army. As Wavell noted, it was considered a target of prime importance.

== Background ==
The Indian National Army was initially formed under Mohan Singh consisting of prisoners taken by Japan in her Malayan campaign and at Singapore. Later, after it was reorganized under Subhas Chandra Bose, it drew a large number of civilian volunteers from Malaya and Burma. Ultimately, a force of under 40,000 was formed, although only two divisions ever participated in the battle. In 1943, intelligence and special services groups from the INA were instrumental in destabilizing the British Indian Army in the early stages of the Arakan offensive. It was during this time that the British Military Intelligence began propaganda work to shield the true numbers who joined the INA, and also described stories of Japanese brutalities that indicated, falsely, INA involvement. Further, the Indian press was prohibited from publishing any accounts whatsoever of the INA.

== First INA ==
The prestige of The Raj had suffered a blow with the fall of Malaya and, later, the massive surrender in Singapore. In February 1942, the Indian prisoners of war from the British Indian Army captured there came under the influence of Indian nationalists, notably Mohan Singh Deb, and a large number volunteered to form the Indian National Army with support from Japan and had the stated aim of overthrowing The Raj from India. The formation of this army however, the British intelligence was unaware of until around July 1942, and even then, was unclear on the scale, purpose and organization of the INA.

=== Espionage in India ===
Intelligence summaries initially did not believe the INA to be a substantial force or have any purpose more than propaganda and espionage purposes. However, by the end of 1942, they had become aware of trained Indian espionage agents (of the INA's Special services group) who had infiltrated into India for the purpose of collecting intelligence, subversion of the army and the subversion of civilian loyalty. This information was derived to a large extent from some of the agents themselves who gave themselves up to the authorities after reaching India. However, the intelligence was also aware at this point of misinformation being spread about the INA itself by the agents who concealed their purpose and professed to pass on intelligence from local knowledge. More troubling for the military command were the activities of the INA agents in the battle fields of India's eastern frontier in Burma.

=== Espionage in Burma frontier ===
Around this time, the Quit India movement had reached a crescendo within India, while the continuing British reversals at Burma further affected the morale of the army. The Irwin's First Campaign had been contained and then beaten back by inferior Japanese forces at Donbaik. Intelligence analysis of the failure, as well as Irwin's own personal analysis of the campaign attributed significant demoralization and rising discontent amongst Indian troops due to the subversive activity of INA agents at the frontline, as well as rising nationalist (or “Pro-Congress”) sentiments. The activities of these agents were addressed at the Sepoys, and these found enough support to successfully encourage defection without attracting the attention of the officers commanding the units. Soon, defection by British Indian troops had become a problem significant and regular enough in the Burma theatre to form a regular part of the intelligence summaries in the first half of 1943.

== Second INA ==
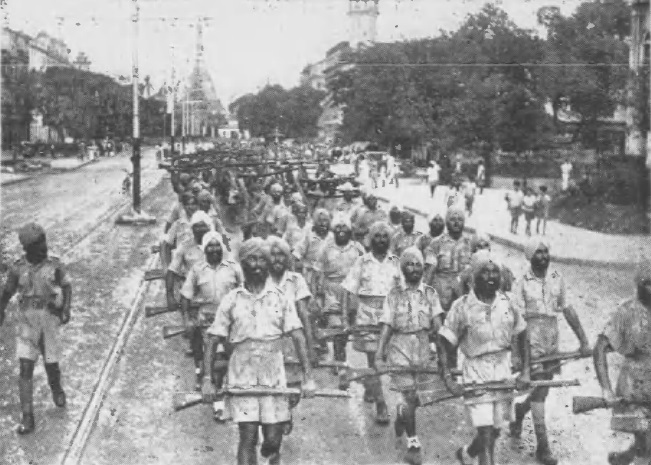
Indian National Army marching in Rangoon, 1944.

The strategy of operation of the Indian National Army, in relation to the opening Japanese offensive, was to be of a guerrilla force that would initiate defections among the British Indian troops, as well as garner support and sympathy among the local population for the INA.

The INA's own strategy was to avoid set-piece battles for which it lacked arms, armament as well as manpower. Initially, it sought to obtain arms as well as increase its ranks from Indian soldiers expected to defect. Once across the hills of North-East India and into the Gangetic plain, it was expected to live off the land and garner support, supplies, and ranks from amongst the local populace to ultimately touch off a revolution. Prem Kumar Sahgal, an officer of the INA, once Military secretary to Subhas Chandra Bose and later tried in the first Red Fort trials, explained that although the war itself hung in balance and nobody was sure if the Japanese would win, initiating a popular revolution with grass-root support within India would ensure that even if Japan lost the war ultimately, Britain would not be in a position to re-assert its colonial authority, which was ultimately the aim of the INA and Azad Hind.

The plans for operation decided between Bose and Masakazu Kawabe specified that the Japanese and INA forces were to follow a common strategy. The INA was to be assigned an independent sector of its own, and no INA unit was to operate at less than battalion strength. For operational purposes, the Subhas Brigade was assigned under the command of the Japanese general headquarters in Burma. The general operations plan envisaged the INA units pushing to Kohima and Imphal with Japanese forces, and as the latter fell, the INA was to cross the Brahmaputra and enter Bengal, beginning the next phase initialing local resistance and revolts within India.

=== Arakan ===
In March 1944, the Japanese forces began its offensive into India's eastern frontier. The plans for the offensive directed three divisions from Kawabe's Burma Area Army to initiate a diversionary attack at Arakan and cover the southern coast while another two divisions watched Stillwell and Chiang Kai-shek's forces in the north. In the center, three divisions from Mutaguchi's 15th army were pushed into Manipur to capture Imphal, scattering British forces and forestalling any offensive movements against Burma. The INA's Special Services Group, redesignated as the Bahadur Group worked with the advanced Japanese units and pathfinders in the opening stages of the Japanese offensive in the upper Burma region and into Manipur. These were tasked to infiltrate through British lines and approach units identified as consisting of significant Indian troops and encourage them to defect. Fay quotes British Intelligence sources to confirm that these units achieved some success in these early stages. In early April a unit of the Bahadur Group, led by Col. Shaukat Malik, broke through the British defenses on 14 April 1944 to capture Moirang in Manipur. The Azad Hind administration took control of this independent Indian territory.

Meanwhile, the 1st battalion of the INA's 1st Guerrilla regiment, lightly armed, was directed towards the south to participate in the diversionary attack. The unit left Rangoon in early February to reach Prome. From Prome, the unit marched across the Chin Hills to reach the Taungup and then up the coast to reach Akyab in early March. By this time the Arakan offensive was nearing its end, and although it had been a successful diversion, Kawabe's forces had failed to capture and destroy Messervy's 17th Indian Division. The 1st battalion marched up the Kaladan river and by middle of March approached Kyauktaw, east of Mayu peninsula. Subsequently, the unit progressed slowly but successfully against Commonwealth African units before crossing the Burma-India border north of Akyab, occupying Mowdok near Chittagong.

=== Imphal and Kohima ===
The Arakan offensive was intended to create a diversion for Mutaguchi's forces, while drawing out and destroying as much of the British reserves as possible. In the center, Mutaguchi's 15th Army was to be the decisive factor in the Manipur Basin. As the battle progressed, Mutaguchi's 31st Division engaged the commonwealth forces at Kohima, while the 15th Division was detailed to move down Kohima road to the North-west of Imphal. The main force detailed to engage Imphal, the 33rd Division (the Yamamoto Force, led by Yamamoto Tsunoru), however, was to approach from the south-east via the Tamu Road that had been built by the Commonwealth forces earlier. The INA's four guerrilla regiments (except for No.1 Battalion) were directed to Tamu road and detailed to push into India as Imphal falls.

The 2nd and 3rd battalions, led by Shah Nawaz Khan, crossed the Chindwin at Kalewa and, after marching up the valley of the Myittha, reached the edge of Chin Hills below Tiddim and Fort White at the end of March. From this position, a unit of the 2nd battalion moved to relieve Japanese forces at Falam while a second company moved to Hakha. The 3rd battalion was meanwhile moved to Fort White-Tonzang area in anticipation of fall of Messervy's forces that would allow it to receive possible volunteers, as well as begin its advance into India.

Among the responsibilities of Khan's forces was the protection of the southern flank of Mutaguchi's forces from Chin irregulars. From the bases at Falam and Hakha, Khan's forces sent out forward patrols and laid ambushes, with some successes, for the Chin guerrillas under the command of a British officer, taking a number of prisoners. In the middle of May, a force under Khan's Adjutant, Mahboob Ahmed, attacked and captured the hilltop fortress of Klang Klang.

With the Messervy's 17th Indians breaking out, however, the 3rd battalion could not be employed in its original perceived role. It was at this time the unit, for whatever reasons, was employed at repairing roads that is widely reported when discussing the INA's role in the Japanese offensive. Learning of this development, an enraged Shah Nawaz ordered it back to base.

With the offensive more or less stopped by mid-May in the face of fierce resistance from the commonwealth forces, Khan's forces were redirected to engage Kohima. Khan moved across the Japanese rear with the 3rd Battalion and portion of the 2nd. By the time he reached Ukhrul however, Mutaguchi's 31st division had begun withdrawing from Kohima. Khan decided to attack Imphal instead.

The 2nd Guerrilla Regiment, or the Gandhi Regiment as it was called, consisted of two battalions. Led by Inayat Kiyani, it was directed along the axis of the 15th Army's offensive. Like the 1st Guerrilla, it had crossed the Chindwin at Kalewa. From Kalewa, the 2nd Guerrilla turned north to reach the vicinity of Tamu in late April. The INA high command was informed at this time of the Yamamoto force's impending assault on the airfield at Palel. The INA unit was still far away. Kiyani picked a force of three hundred under Maj. Pritam Singh that could advance faster. Armed lightly and without machine guns, the unit was directed to attack the airfield from the south while Japanese forces engaged the eastern defenses.

Pritam's unit was however, walked into an ambush laid by a detachment of Gurkhas. By the end of the night, Pritam's unit made a number of counterattacks. They were soon reinforced by the rest of Kiani's men. The skirmish turned into bloody fight as the alerted British forces reinforced and called up air and artillery support. After two days of failed counterattacks and taking heavy losses, Kiani withdrew. The unit suffered nearly two hundred casualties in the assault. The 2nd Guerrilla was never able to participate in further attacks up the Tamu Road after this. It was subsequently tasked to cover the left flank of the Yamamoto force, in the rough countries of the south. Through June, the unit maintained aggressive patrols south of Palel-Tamu Road, mounting raids and laying ambushes against the by now advancing British forces. It started withdrawing with the Japanese in late June.

The 3rd Guerrilla, or the Azad regiment, was under the command of Col. Gulzara Singh. The unit marched from Yeu through the Kabaw valley to arrive near Tamu in late May, by which time, the offensive was petering out. The unit was tasked to cover the right flank of the Yamamoto force. The unit stayed with the Yamamoto force, covering its right flank, and began retreating with it when it began withdrawing in mid-July.

The 4th Guerrilla, or the Nehru regiment, left Malaya the last among the INA's 1st division, and never made it to the Chindwin.

The initial successes in upper Burma, the engagements at Kohima, and the encirclement of Imphal was a key factor in convincing the INA that the offensive was succeeding. The forward HQ of the INA was moved to Maymyo, in anticipation of moving into Indian territory and taking charge of these as they fell.

=== Burma ===
The commonwealth forces broke the siege of Imphal on 22 June 1944. By mid-July, the fortunes of battle had been reversed, and the Yamamoto force began a fighting withdrawal with the forces of the INA's first division protecting its flanks. The INA forces began withdrawing two days before Mutaguchi's forces, while Shah Nawaz's forces had already reached Tamu. The withdrawing forces faced acute shortages of supply of food, ammunition and medicine, compounded by the Monsoon rains which rendered the Japanese supply chains as well as INA's own already poor logistics further incapable. Disease, compounded poor sanitation, malnutrition, lack of medicine, and the inability to evacuate the worse affected due to a lack of transport took a heavy toll on both INA as well as Japanese troops.

Fay describes the retreat of the units under Shah Nawaz in some detail, holding that the other units must have gone through a similar experience. The unit left from Tamu to reach Ahlow, and from there they took boats to reach Teraun. Up to Ahlow, the sick was transported by Bullock Carts. By the time it reached Teraun, some of the troops had started dying of starvation. Although some local supplies were obtained at Teraun, no boats were available to cross the Yu River. Shah Nawaz had to leave nearly four hundreds of his sick behind to reach Kuwa, half of who would die before they could be arranged to be evacuated. From Kuwa, the unit was able to obtain boats, which took the remaining troops to Kalewa, fifty miles south. Critical supplies of food and medicine and limited transport arrangements could be made. The unit was dispersed between hastily constructed camps at Monywa, Maymyo further south, and to some of the INA hospitals. The regiments were massively depleted by the time they made it back to their stations. Only one battalion remained of the Gandhi by early July.

=== Preparing for defense ===
Of the INA's 1st division, the elements of what remained of the 1st Guerrilla Regiment were stationed at the town of Budalin, south of Yeu through most of early Autumn, while the remaining battalion of the 2nd and the units of the 3rd (Gandhi and Azad, respectively) were stationed in Mandalay in the south and at Chaungu to the north of it respectively. All the three regiments were ordered to Pyinmana, south of Mandalay, in November to reorganize. All three units later came under the command of (then) Maj. Gen Shah Nawaz Khan.

The 4th Guerrilla regiment, which had reached Mandalay by the time the Imphal offensive was called off, was in the meantime ordered southwest to Myingyan, which it was tasked to defend. The troops, however held considerable resentment against the attitude and conduct of some of its officers, which had started souring by the time it was on the move. At Mandalay, the unit suffered a mutiny, with six hundred men refusing to obey orders from officers. Although they were arrested, they were not ultimately court-martialled on Subhas Chandra Bose's refusal to consent. The unit was transferred to the command of Gurbaksh Singh Dhillon at Myingyan. On 29 January 1945, the 4th under Dhillon was ordered south to Nyaungu to oppose the elements of British IV corps moving down the Gangaw valley, troops of Slim's South Lancashire Regiment.

Of the 2nd Division, the 1st Infantry Regiment had started for the front in May 1944 overland, while its heavy weaponry were to transported by sea. These were, however, lost when the ship carrying the weapons was Torpedoed somewhere between Victoria point and Mergui. The unit assembled in Rangoon in September to be judged unfit to proceed further until re-equipped.

The 5th Guerrilla Regiment was moved in December 1944 from Malaya to Mingaladon, close to Rangoon in December, when it came under the command of Prem Kumar Sahgal. During this time, it drew officers from the 1st Infantry Regiment and the civilian training centre in Rangoon and was redesignated the 2nd Infantry regiment. The unit left Rangoon on 26 January for Prome.

=== Irrawaddy ===
For the Commonwealth IV Corps's sector, it was vital to seize the area around Pakokku and establish a firm bridgehead quickly. Slim's 7th Indian Division's crossing was made on a wide front.

Pagan and Nyaungu were defended by two battalions (No.s 7 and 9) of the Indian National Army's 4th Guerrilla Regiment, with the 8th battalion held in reserve at Tetthe. Of these, the 7th battalion, totalling about four hundred troops, was positioned to the east of Nyangu town, while Pagan was being defended by about five hundred troops of the 9th battalion at Pagan. The regiment was armed with rifles, three light mortars with sixty rounds between them, and four machineguns.

Messervy's 7th Indian division, attempting to cross the Irrawaddy in broad daylight, initially suffered heavy losses as their assault boats broke down under machine-gun fire directed from the positions where the 7th battalion had dug in. Slim noted this in his memoirs as "the longest opposed river crossing attempted in any theatre of the Second World War" Eventually, however, support from tanks of the Gordon Highlanders firing across the river and massed artillery forced the nearly hundred of the defenders at Nyaungu to surrender, the rest fled. At Pagan, the defending 9th battalion also suffered a similar fate offering resistance to the 11th Sikh Regiment before it withdrew to Mount Popa.

=== Mount Popa ===
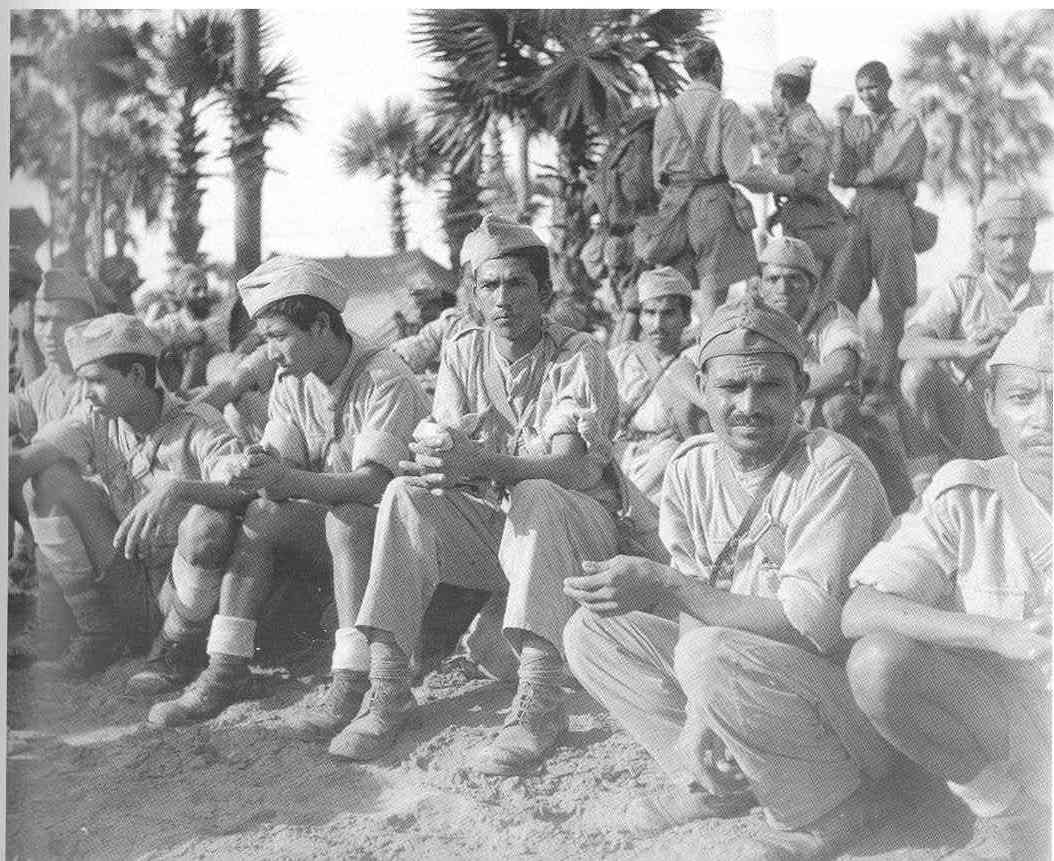
Troops of the Indian National Army who surrendered at Mount Popa, April 1945.

The 2nd Infantry, with Col P.K Sahgal in charge, was in the meantime tasked to take defensive positions at Mount Popa, which it was hoped would help secure the Yenangyaung with its oilfields. Sahgal's unit was tasked to work with a unit of the 28th Army, the Kanjo force or Kanjo Butai commanded by Yamamoto Tsunoru. The unit started reaching Popa in the middle of February in bits and pieces, making their way up from Prome on foot. Popa lay east of the Messervy's 17th Indian Division's course, heading towards Myingyan-Meiktila road.

With the fall of Meiktila on 3 March, its recapture had become a priority for Hyotaro Kimura, now commanding the Burma Area Army, who attempted to encircle the 17th Indian Division which was isolated from the rest of Slim's VI corps. While the majority of Kimura's available forces attempted to retake Miktila, Yamamoto's 72nd Independent Mixed Brigade was tasked to recapture Nyangu as well as its western bank, while the Kanjo Butai and the INA's 2nd Infantry were tasked to secure grounds east of the town.

At Popa, Sahgal's 2nd infantry regiment was reinforced with the remnants of Dhillon's 4th Guerrilla and Khan's 1st Guerrilla. Khan had in the meantime been given the command of the 2nd Division. By the last week of March, the last of Sahgals units had reached Popa. Sahgal sent out roving columns to engage the British forces. Using guerrilla tactics, his troops, along with Dhillon's, engaged British troops. For their part, the latter used similar tactics of "search and destroy" using small units of highly mobile mechanised troops. To prevent the allied forces from identifying his actual strength while the rest of his troops arrived in small packet, Sahgal set up active and aggressive patrolling, with Dhillon ordering the same to his unit. The troops successfully laid ambushes and engaged the British troops using guerrilla tactics. Lacking heavy arms or artillery support, Sahgal's forces used guerrilla tactics, working in small units with the Kanjo Butai (a regiment detached from the Japanese 55th Division), and was successful for a considerable period of time.

The 7th Indian division now faced the additional task of protecting the lines of communication to the besieged 17th Indian Division through the two roads that ran through the region. Towards the end of March, the leading motorised brigade of Indian 5th Division reinforced them, and began clearing the Japanese and the INA troops from their strongholds in and around Mount Popa to clear the land route to Meiktila. By the end of the month, Sahgal was forced to withdraw his forces further to Leygi, five miles (8 km) from Popa. By 3 April, the last of the British operations to clear resistance in and around Popa began, as Sahgals forces successfully defended their position against a number of attacks by units of the 5th motorised brigade. By the end of the 6th however, Sahgal had begun losing men to in a massive scale as his 1st battalion defected after having faced off the attacks of the 5th. As the Japanese began to withdraw on the 8th, the orders for the INA's withdrawal were issued by Shah Nawaz on the 10th.

Moving only by night and under air attacks, the units at and around Popa withdrew, helped by fierce resistance from three skeleton Japanese divisions at Pyawbwe. Sahgal, with the larger number of the remnant and pursued by Slim's forces, withdrew over the Kyaukpadaung-Meiktila road towards Natmauk before it was cut off by the allied forces, while Shah Nawaz and Dhillon's forces, numbering a few hundred, turned towards the Irrawaddy at Magway. Approaching Natmauk, Sahgal learnt of the fall of Yenangyaung to the British forces, who now approached Magwe. He turned towards Prome, attempting to outrun the pursuing British forces to Allanmyo and attempting a breakthrough over the Irrawaddy in the direction of Prome. He, however, could not. Reaching the banks of the river on the 26th he discovered his route blocked by British forces who had outrun him. Having been identified by allied aircraft flying over the area after a brief firefight, Sahgal and his forces surrendered the next day at the village of Magyigan.

=== Fall of Rangoon ===
As the Japanese forces withdrew from Rangoon and the city prepared to surrender, the British PoWs were released from their captivity. The 6000 strong INA contingent in the city under Major Loganathan surrendered to the provisional British formed by these troops and helped maintain law and order in the crumbling city before forces from Slim's 14th Army entered the city.

=== Withdrawal from Burma ===
With the surrender of Sahgal's forces at Irrawaddy and the remnants of Khan and Dhillon's forces a few weeks later, the INA's fighting capability was all but annihilated. Bose's government had withdrawn from Rangoon along with the Japanese forces and Ba Maw's government. The remnants of the INA's first guerrilla regiment, the X-regiment as it came to be called then, also attempted to march to Bangkok. The Rani of Jhansi troops, who were around Rangoon at this time, began a long march on foot through Burma in efforts to reach Singapore or the safe haven of Bangkok. Bose walked with them. Their retreat was hindered by Aung San's Burmese guerrillas, as well as by Chinese forces who laid ambushes for the retreating Japanese troops.

== Indische Legion ==
The Indische Legion was an Indian armed unit raised in 1941 attached to the Wehrmacht, ostensibly according to the concept of an Indian Liberation force during World War II by Subhas Chandra Bose in Nazi Germany. The initial recruits were Indian student volunteers resident in Germany at the time, and a handful from the Indian PoWs captured by Rommel during his North Africa Campaign. It would later draw a larger number of Indian PoWs as volunteers. Indische Legion was supposed to become a pathfinder that was to precede a much larger Indo-German force in a caucasian campaign into the western frontiers of British India and was supposed to encourage public resentment of the Raj and incite the British Indian army into revolt. A majority of the troops of the Free India Legion were only ever stationed in Europe -mostly in non-combat duties- from Netherlands, to Atlantic Wall duties in France till the Allied invasion of France. A small contingent, including the leadership and the officer corps, was also transferred to Azad Hind after its formation and saw action in the INA's Burma Campaign.

=== Holland and France ===
A majority of the troops of the Indian Legion, were to remain in Europe through the war and was never utilized in their original perceived role over Persia and Central Asia. The Legion was transferred to Zeeland in the Netherlands in April 1943 as part of the Atlantic Wall duties and later to France in September 1943, attached to 344 Infanterie-Division, and later the 159 Infanterie-Division of the Wehrmacht.

From Beverloo in Belgium, I Battalion was reassigned to Zandvoort in May 1943 where they stayed until relieved by Georgian troops in August. In September 1943, the battalion was deployed on the Atlantic coast of Bordeaux on the Bay of Biscay. The II Battalion moved from Beverloo to the island of Texel in May 1943 and stayed there till relieved in September of that year. From here, it was deployed to Les Sables d'Olonne in France. The III Battalion remained at Oldebroek as Corps Reserve until the end of September 1943, where they gained a "wild and loathsome" reputation amongst the natives.

=== Indische Freiwilligen Legion der Waffen SS ===
The Legion was stationed in the Lacanau region of Bordeaux at the time of the Normandy landings and remained there for up to two months after D-Day. On 8 August, its control was transferred to the Waffen SS (as was that of every other volunteer unit of the Wehrmacht). Command of the legion was very shortly transferred from Kurt Krapp to Heinz Bertling. On 15 August 1944, the unit pulled out of Lacanau to make its way back to Germany. It was in the second leg of this journey, from Poitier to Chatrou that it suffered its first combat casualty (Lt Ali Khan) while engaging French Regular forces in the town of Dun. The unit also engaged with allied armour at Nuits-Saint-Georges while retreating across the Loire to Dijon. It was regularly harassed by the French Resistance, suffering two more casualties (Lt Kalu Ram and Capt Mela Ram). The unit moved from Remiremont, through Alsace, to Oberhofen near the town of Heuberg in Germany in the winter of 1944, where it stayed till March 1945.

=== Italy ===
The 9th Company of II Battalion of the Legion also saw action in Italy. Having been deployed in the spring of 1944, it faced the British 5th Corps and the Polish 2nd Corps before it was withdrawn from the front to be used in antipartisan operations. It surrendered to the Allied forces April 1945, still in Italy.

== Impact ==
The INA's role in military terms is considered to be relatively insignificant, given its small numerical strength, lack of heavy weapons (it utilized captured British and Dutch arms initially), relative dependence on Japanese logistics and planning as well as its lack of independent planning. Shah Nawaz claims in his personal memoirs that the INA was a very potent and motivated force. Fay however, reinforces the argument that the INA was relatively less significant in military terms. Its special services group played a significant part in halting the First Arakan Offensive while still under Mohan Singh's command. Later, during the Japanese U-Go offensive towards Manipur in 1944, it played a crucial and successful role in the diversionary attacks in Arakan as well as in the Manipur Basin itself where it fought with Mutaguchi's 15th Army. It qualified itself well in the Battles in Arakan, Manipur, Imphal, and later during the withdrawal through Manipur and Burma. The commanders like L.S. Mishra, Raturi, Mansukhlal, M.Z. Kiyani, and others attracted the attention of the Japanese as well as the British forces. Later, during the Burma Campaign, it did play a notable role in the Battles of Irrawaddy and Meiktilla especially in the latter, supporting the Japanese offensive and tying down British troops. Fay also notes the published accounts of several veterans, including that of William Slim that portrays INA-troops as incapable fighters and untrustworthy, and points out the inconsistencies and conflicts between the different accounts to conclude that intelligence propaganda as well as institutional bias may have played a significant part in the portrayed opinions. It is however noted that the INA did indeed suffer a number of notable incidents of desertion. Fay notes the significant ones amongst these were not during the offensives into Manipur and the subsequent retreat through Burma, when incidents of desertion did occur but at a far smaller numbers than the fourteenth army told its troops. The significant desertions, Fay notes, occurred around the Battles at Irrawaddy and later around Popa. During the fall of Rangoon, 6000 INA troops manned the city to maintain order before allied troops entered the city.

Nevertheless, Fay argues, the INA was not significant enough to militarily beat the British Indian Army, and was moreover aware of this and formulated its own strategy of avoiding set-piece battles, garnering local and popular support within India and instigating revolt within the British Indian army to overthrow the Raj. Moreover, the Forward Bloc underground within India had been crushed well before the offensives opened in the Burma-Manipur theatre, depriving the army of any organised internal support.

== Bibliography ==
- Aldrich, Ricjard J (2000), Intelligence and the War Against Japan: Britain, America and the Politics of Secret Service, Cambridge University Press, ISBN 0-521-64186-1
- Fay, Peter W. (1993), The Forgotten Army: India's Armed Struggle for Independence, 1942-1945., Ann Arbor, University of Michigan Press., ISBN 0-472-08342-2
- Chand, Hukam (2005), History of modern India: (1885 A.D.-1947 A.D.), Anmol publications, New Delhi., ISBN 81-261-2283-8
- Sarkar, Sumit (1983), Modern India, 1885-1947, Delhi:Macmillan, ISBN 978-0-333-90425-1
- Slim, W. (1961), Defeat into Victory., New York, David McKay., ISBN 1-56849-077-1
