= Shangara Singh Mann =

- Military career
- Allegiance: Azad Hind
- Branch: Indian National Army
- Rank: Captain
- Conflicts: World War II; South-East Asian Theatre
- Awards: Sardar-e-Jung; Vir-e-Hind

Shangara Singh Mann was an officer of the Indian National Army during World War II. He served as a captain and company commander during some of the earliest fighting against the British Indian Army in Assam, for which he was awarded the Sardar-e-Jung, the second-highest decoration bestowed by Azad Hind for valour in combat, and the Vir-e-Hind medal. Subhas Chandra Bose himself gave Singh Mann his medals in Rangoon. He was captured by the British and held in a prison in Multan from January 1945 to February 1946. Soon after he was released and he returned to his family in the Punjab, his life was disrupted by the partition of India. In 1959, he settled in Vadodara, Gujarat, where he remained as of 2001. He died aged 113.
