= Former Indian National Army Monument =

Memorial site in Singapore

Indian National Army Monument
- Indian National Army
- For Unknown Warrior
- Established: July 8, 1945
- Location: 1°17′22″N 103°51′13″E; Esplanade Park near Downtown Core, Singapore
- Ittehad, Ittemad, Qurbani

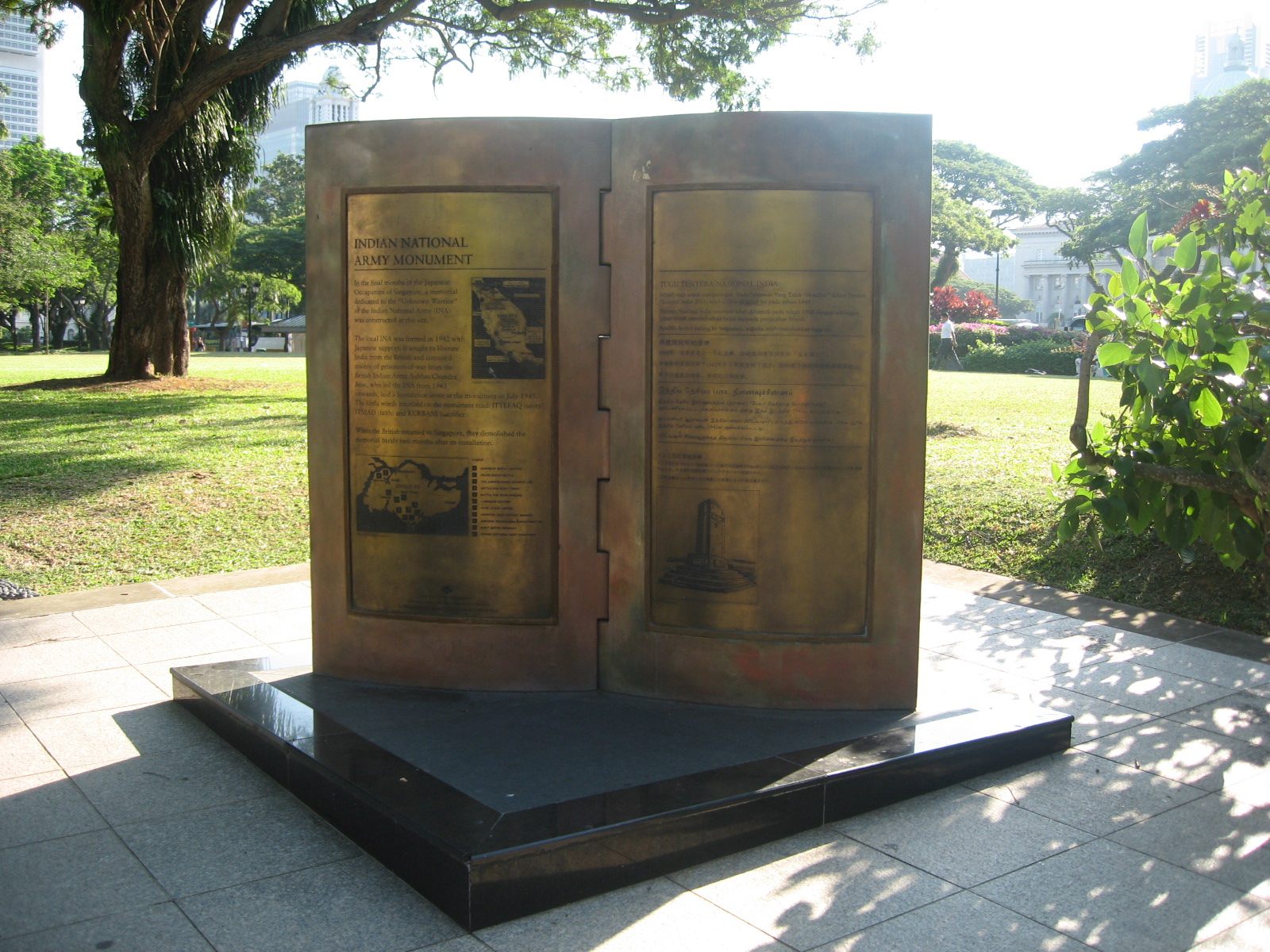
The former Indian National Army Monument site at Esplanade Park in Singapore is now marked by a plaque erected by the National Heritage Board.

The Former Indian National Army Monument (Chinese: 印度国民军纪念碑) is a historical site and a demolished war memorial at the Esplanade Park located at Connaught Drive within the downtown of Singapore.

== History ==
=== Foundation stone laying by Subhas Chandra Bose and construction ===
The monument was constructed to commemorate the "Unknown Warrior" of the Indian National Army (INA). The words inscribed on the war memorial were its motto, which is Unity (Ittehad), Faith (Ittemad) and Sacrifice (Qurbani). It was built during the Japanese Occupation of Singapore as the Japanese and the INA had one enemy in common, i.e., the British.

Subhas Chandra Bose ("Netaji") laid the foundation stone on 8 July 1945, and the words inscribed upon the War Memorial were the motto of the INA: Unity (Etihaad), Faith (Etmad) and Sacrifice (Kurbani). The monument was then erected within a month by the Japanese in August 1945, a few months before Singapore was recaptured by the British. The memorial was designed and erected by Colonel Cyril John Stracey, 1/14th Punjab Regiment, an Anglo-Indian officer of the INA, who had volunteered to serve INA after being captured by the Japanese. The construction of the monument was proposed by Bose, the co-founder of the INA and Head of State of the Provisional Government of Free India. The INA was backed by the Japanese forces for its goal of gaining India's independence from Britain.

The future generations of Indians who will be born, not as slaves but as free men, because of your colossal sacrifice, will bless your names and proudly proclaim to the world that you, their forbears, fought and suffered reverses in the battle of Manipur, Assam and Burma. But through temporary failure you paved the way to ultimate success and glory.

— Subhas Chandra Bose while paying homage to the martyrs of the INA while laying foundation stone of the Former INA Monument at Singapore on 8 July 1945.,

=== Demolition by British ===
Lord Louis Mountbatten, the head of Southeast Asia Command, ordered the Former Indian National Army Monument to be demolished when Singapore was recaptured by the Allies in 1945. It has been suggested by some historians that Mountbatten's decision to demolish the INA memorial was part of a larger effort to prevent the spread of the nationalist ideals of the INA in the political atmosphere of the Cold War and the decolonization of Asia.

=== Restoration: Erection of plaque by National Heritage Board ===
In 1995, the National Heritage Board marked the place as a historical site and subsequently with financial donations from the Indian community in Singapore, a new monument commemorating the previous one was erected on that spot.

== Gallery ==
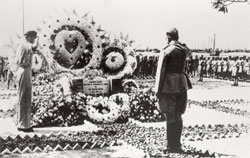
Bose visiting the now-demolished INA Memorial at Esplanade Park during June 1945. He would die on August 18th.

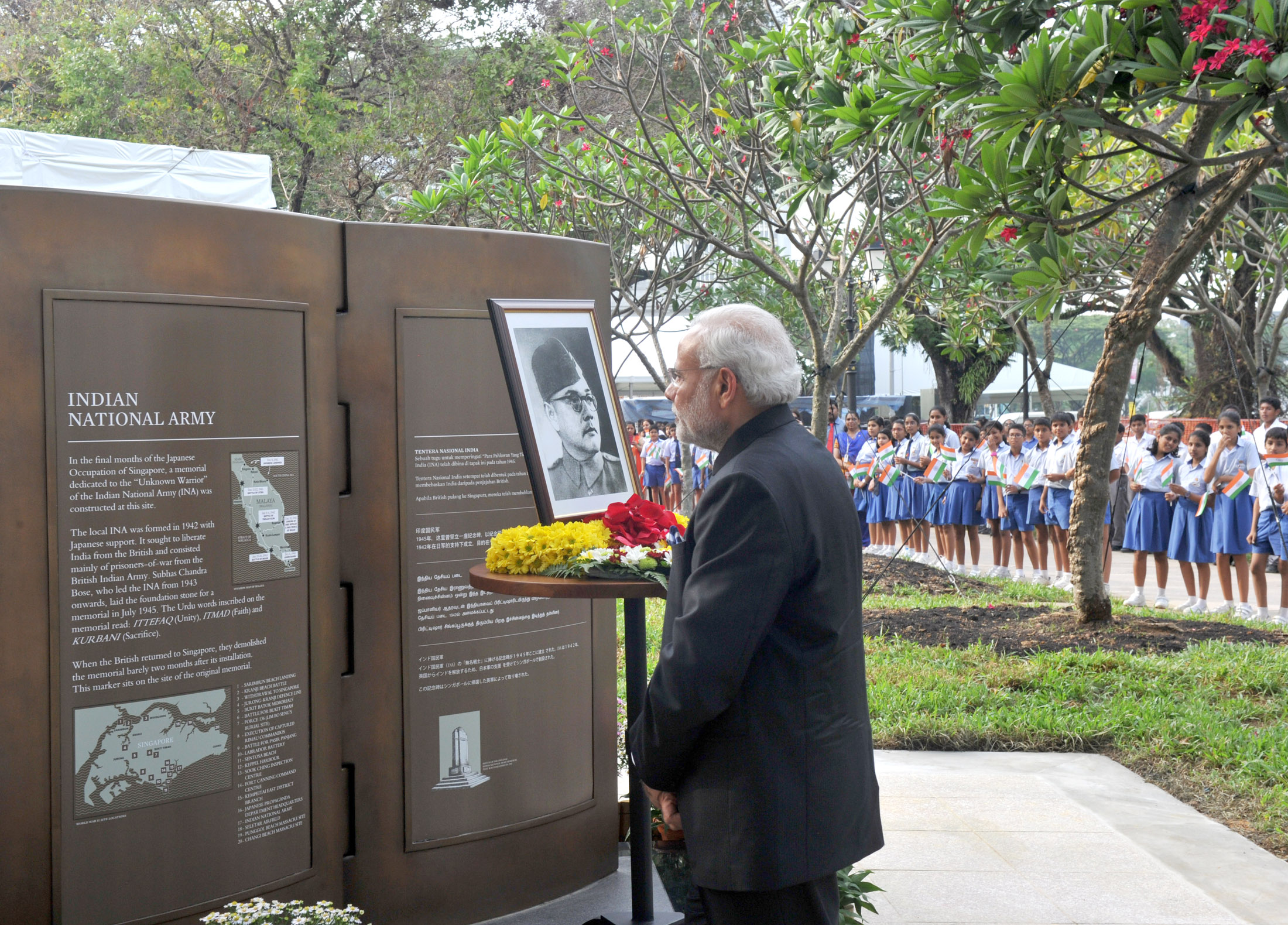
The Prime Minister of India, Narendra Modi paying homage to members of the INA who died in the war on 24 November 2015 at the present-day plaque which marks the site of former INA Memorial.

== Other INA related sites in Singapore ==
Indian National Army related

- Cathay Building
- Farrer Park Field
- INA Martyrs' Memorial
- Indian National Army in Singapore

== See also ==
Other war memorials in Singapore

- Civilian War Memorial
- Kranji War Memorial
- The Cenotaph, Singapore

General

- History of Singapore
- Japanese Occupation of Singapore
- Greater India
- INA treasure controversy
