= Sardar-e-Jung =

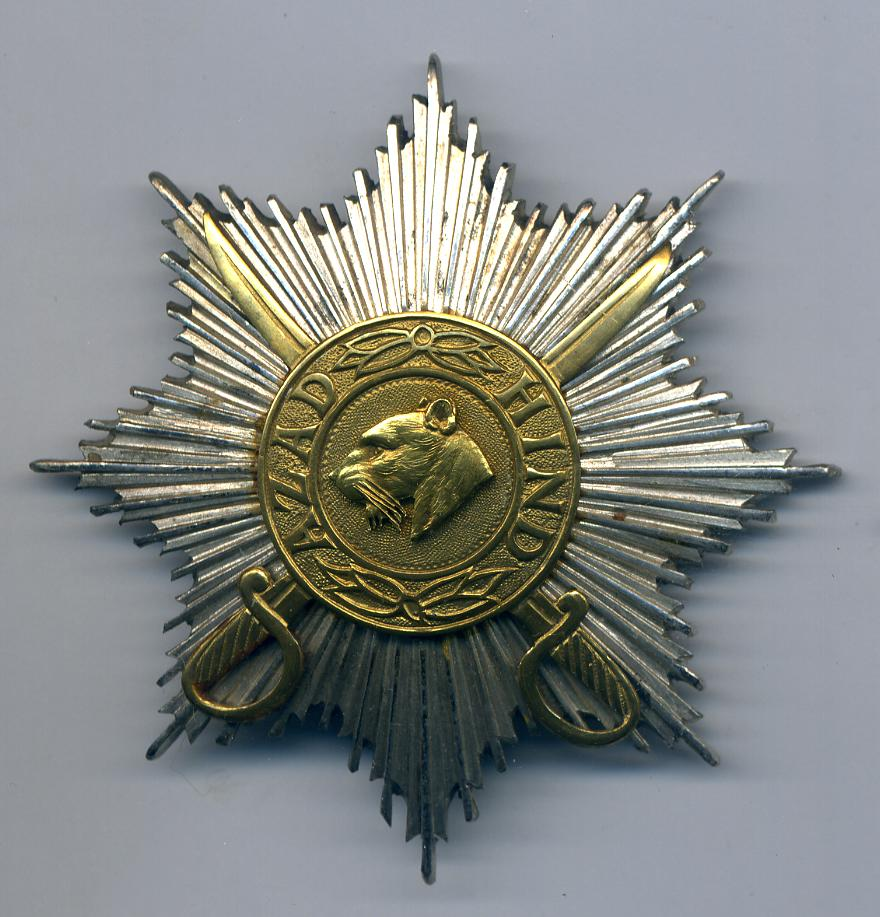
- The Sardar-e-Jung award with swords.
- Type: Badge
- Awarded for: Valour
- Presented by: Azad Hind
- Eligibility: Soldiers of the Indische Legion, Indian National Army, and the Wehrmacht.
- Status: Currently not existent.
- First award: Second World War
- Final award: Second World War

Highlights
- Total: Unknown
- Total awarded posthumously: Unknown
- Total recipients: Colonel Pritam Singh; Colonel Shaukat Malik; Major Pitri Sharan Raturi; Captain Shangara Singh Mann; Lieutenant Kunwar Balwant Singh

Precedence
- Next (higher): Sher-e-Hind
- Next (lower): Vir-e-Hind

The Sardar-e-Jung (Leader of Battle) was the second highest military decoration by the awarded by the Azad Hind Government. First instituted by Subhas Chandra Bose in Germany, it was later also awarded to troops of the Indian National Army in South East Asia. The award could be conferred with swords for valour in combat, and without swords for non-combat awards. At least five awards were made, one to Colonel Shaukat Malik for the capture of Moirang, to Captain Shangara Singh Mann and to Lieutenant Kunwar Balwant Singh for capturing British Army Post at Modak. Captain Mann was also awarded the Vir-e-Hind medal. Colonel Pritam Singh was awarded Sardar-e-jung, he captured a hill named Pritam Hill in Burma and Palel Airport, Major Pitri Sharan Raturi was awarded for Battle of Kaladan.

== See also ==
- Sher-e-Hind
- Indian National Army
- Indische Legion
