= INA Martyrs' Memorial Complex =

War memorial at Moirang, India

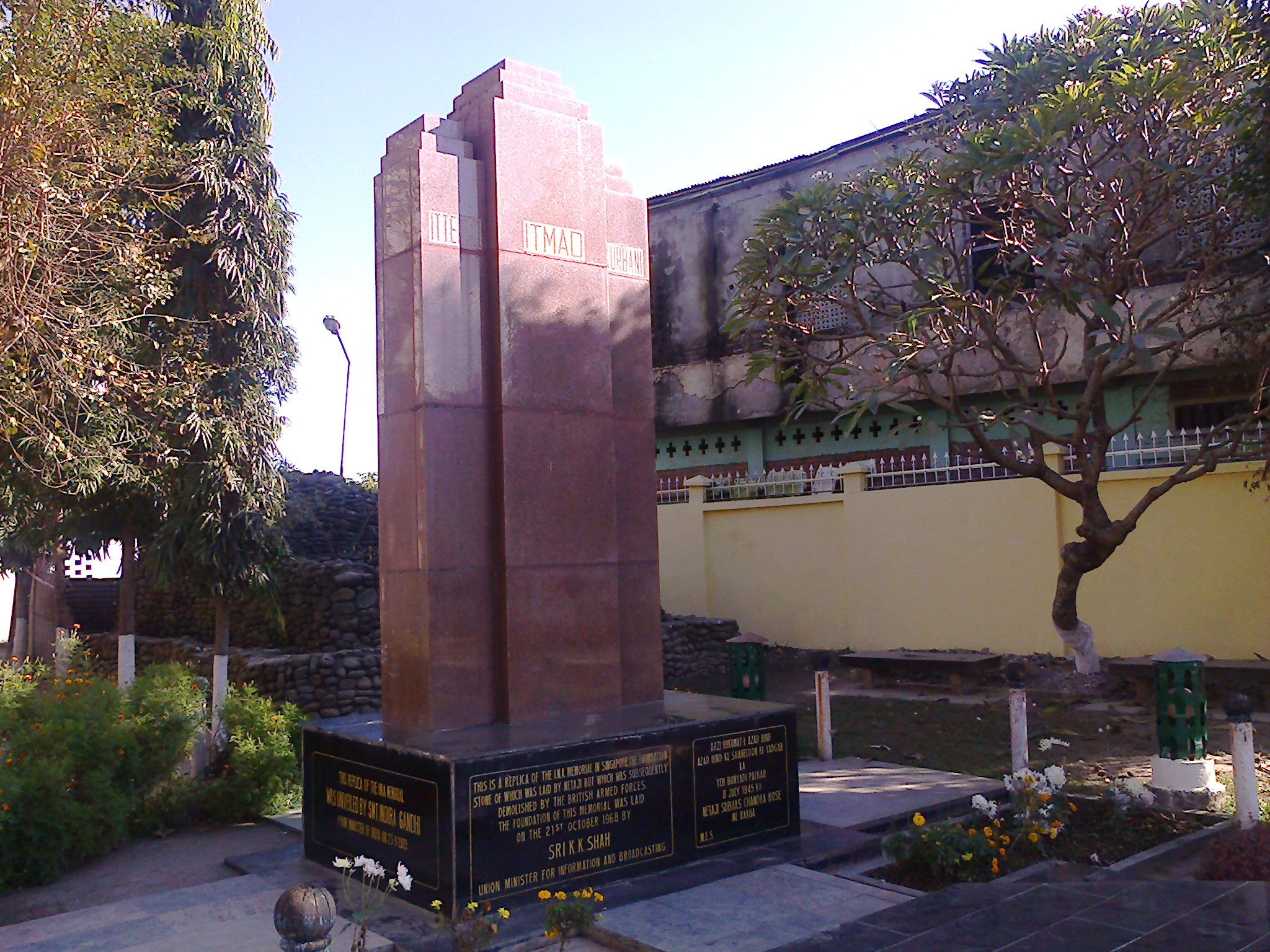
The INA memorial, Moirang as it stands today

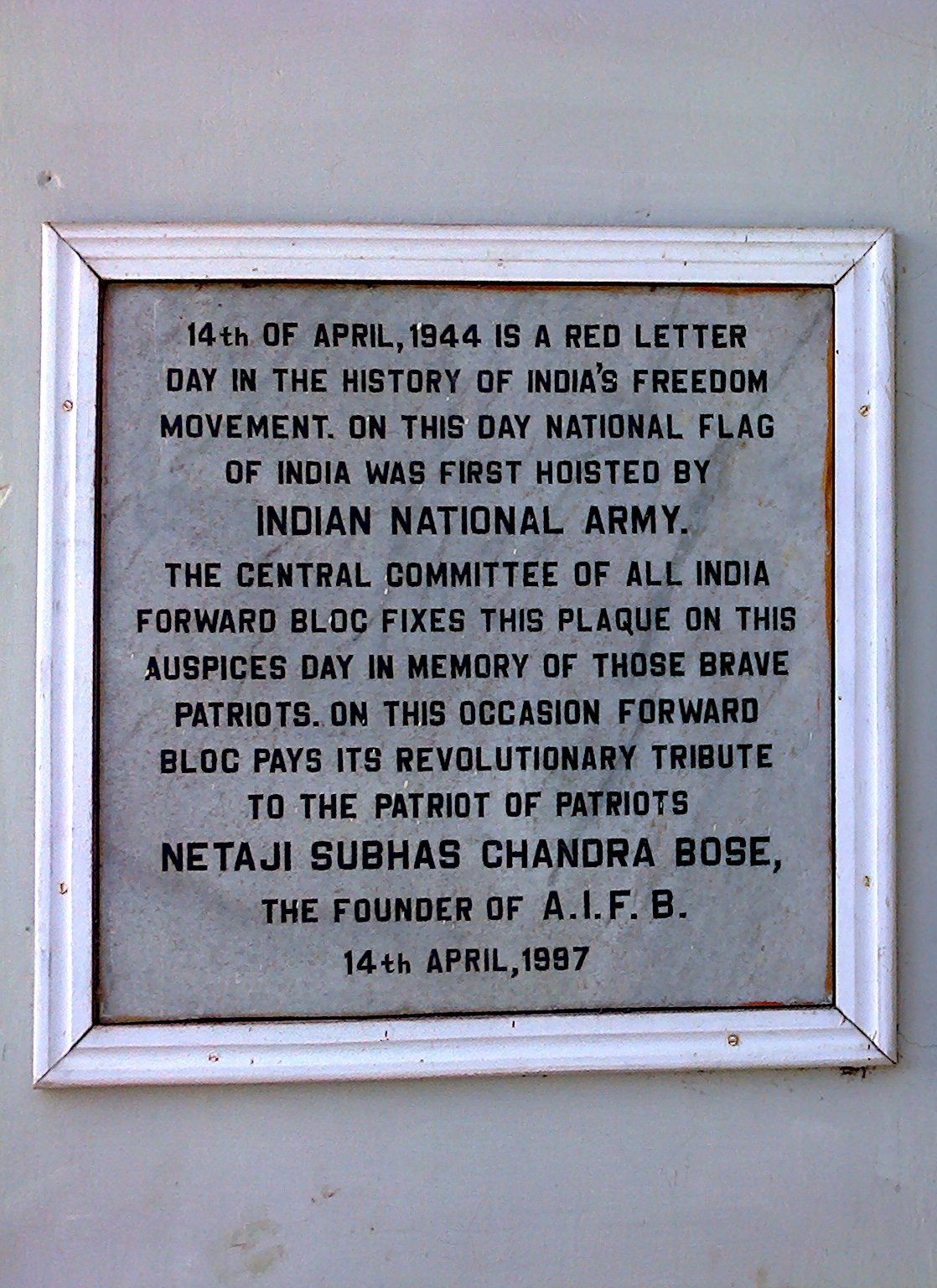
INA Memorial Complex in Moirang

The INA Martyrs' Memorial complex is a war memorial at Moirang, 45 km south of Imphal, in Manipur state of India, dedicated to the soldiers of the Indian National Army. The main feature of the complex is a reconstruction of the INA's memorial to its fallen soldiers as it stood in Singapore, before its demolition at the hands of British Indian Army sappers in 1945. The complex also contains a museum dedicated to the INA along with a library and an auditorium and a statue of Subhas Chandra Bose. Work on the cenotaph itself began in October 1968 and was completed in September 1969, when it was unveiled by Indira Gandhi. Work on expanding the monument complex to present-day size was completed in 2005, when it was unveiled. The total cost in building the memorial was Rs 6.23 crores. A stone monument has also been erected at the historic Moirang Kangla, where Colonel S. A. Malik, leading an INA unit, raised the flag of Azad Hind in April 1944. The Imphal state government has administered the site since 1985. Close to the complex is the peace memorial at Lotpaching, raised by the Japanese government. 205 km north of Moirang & 55 km east of Kohima is another monument at Chesezu (also called Chesezumi) related to INA, with a statue of Subhash Chandra Bose marking the last camp where Neta ji Subhash Chandra Bose camped for 2 months.

== See also ==
- Former Indian National Army Monument, in Singapore
- Battle of Imphal
- Shaukat Hayat Malik
- Indian National Army
