= INA treasure controversy =

Alleged misappropriation by men of Azad Hind

The INA treasure controversy relates to alleged misappropriation by men of Azad Hind of the Azad Hind fortune recovered from belongings of Subhas Chandra Bose in his last known journey. The treasure, a considerable amount of gold ornaments and gems, is said to have been recovered from Bose's belongings following the fatal plane crash in Formosa (present-day Taiwan) that reportedly killed him, and taken to men of Azad Hind then living in Japan. The Indian government was made aware of a number of these individuals allegedly using part of the recovered treasure for personal use. However, despite repeated warnings from Indian diplomats in Tokyo, Nehru is said to have disregarded allegations that men previously associated with Azad Hind misappropriated the funds for personal benefit. Some of these are said to have travelled to Japan repeatedly with the approval of Nehru government and were later given government roles implementing Nehru's political and economic agenda. A very small portion of the alleged treasure was repatriated to India in the 1950s.

It is estimated that Netaji carried with him approximately 106 kg of treasures in four iron boxes while starting his final journey from Bangkok on 17 August 1945 morning. At Saigon he had to shed around 38 kg of treasures and took the already overloaded onward bound bomber with only two boxes. Next day the bomber crashed at the airfield while taking off from Taihoku, Formosa, at around 2.30pm, killing Netaji and five other Japanese. The Japanese army salvaged around 16 kg of scattered treasures and later sent it to the Indian Independence League headquarters at Tokyo. What came back to India on 10 November 1952 was 11 kg of treasures, which is lying in the National Museum vault at New Delhi.

== Documentary ==
- 'Netaji Bose - The Lost Treasure' a documentary by History TV18 channel.

== See also ==
- Indian National Army
- Death of Subhas Chandra Bose
- INA Martyrs' Memorial
- Indian National Army in Singapore
