= Kranji War Memorial =

Burial area in Singapore

Singapore War Memorial, Kranji Tanah Perkuburan Perang Kranji 克兰芝阵亡战士公坟 கிராஞ்சி போர் நினைவு
- Commonwealth War Graves Commission and the Netherlands
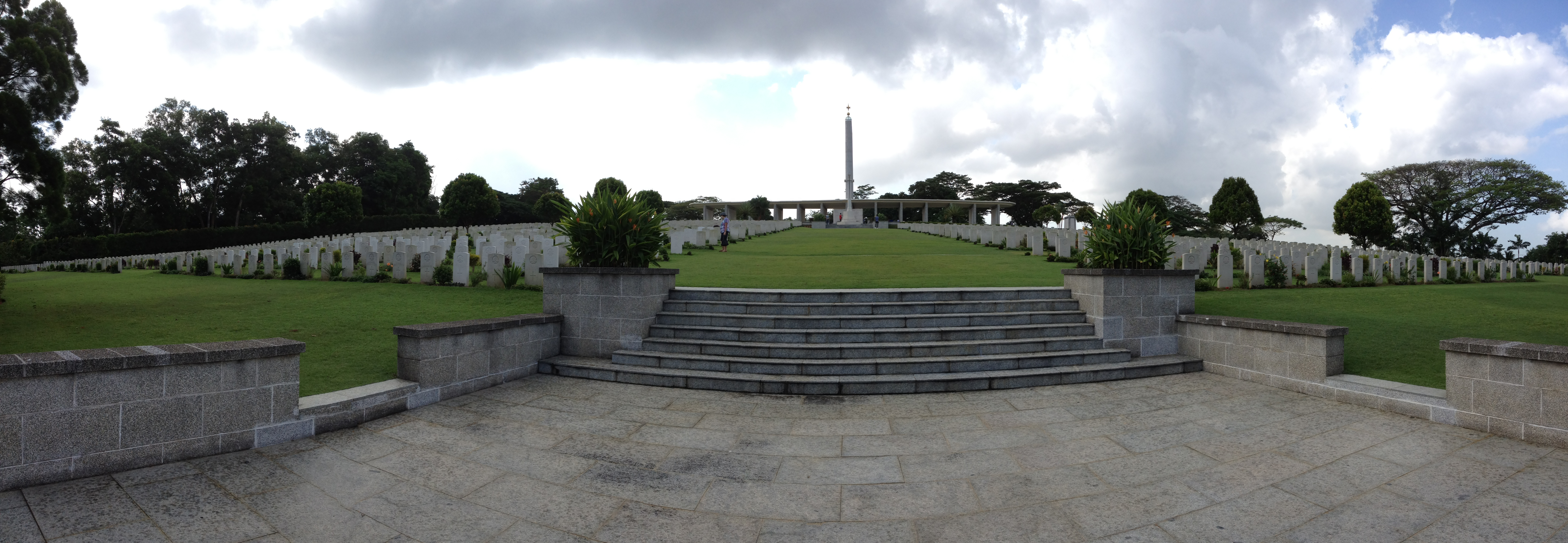
- Panoramic view of Kranji War Memorial
- For the dead of World War II
- Unveiled: 1946
- Location: 1.4190°N 103.7573°E near Kranji, Singapore
- On the walls of this memorial are recorded the names of twenty-four thousand soldiers and airmen of many races united in service to the British crown who gave their lives in Malaya and neighbouring lands and seas and in the air over southern and eastern Asia and the Pacific but to whom the fortune of war denied the customary rites accorded to their comrades in death THEY DIED FOR ALL FREE MEN

The Kranji War Memorial (Chinese: 克兰芝阵亡战士公坟; Malay: Tanah Perkuburan Perang Kranji; Tamil: கிராஞ்சி போர் நினைவு) is located at 9 Woodlands Road, in Kranji in northern Singapore. Dedicated to the men and women from the United Kingdom, Australia, Canada, Sri Lanka, India, Malaya, the Netherlands and New Zealand who died defending Singapore and Malaya against the invading Japanese forces during World War II, it comprises the War Graves, the Memorial Walls, the State Cemetery, and the Military Graves.

== Overview ==
The War Memorial represents the three branches of the military – the Air Force, Army and Navy. The columns represent the Army, which marches in columns, the cover over the columns is shaped after the wings of a plane, representing the Air Force, and the shape at the top resembles the sail of a submarine, representing the Navy.

The Memorial's walls inscribe over 24,000 names of Allied personnel whose bodies were never found, spread over both sides of 12 columns of the war memorial itself. On the Kranji War Memorial the names of 191 Canadian airmen are inscribed.

The grounds of the memorial is set on a hilly terrain. The grounds are maintained by the Commonwealth War Graves Commission, and accessible only from Woodlands Road, the same road that the Imperial Guards Division of the Japanese 25th Army had marched down on 9 February 1942.

Kranji War Memorial and Cemetery has been included into the photographic archive by the War Graves Photographic Project in association with the Commonwealth War Graves Commission. Each individual grave has been recorded together with each and every column on the memorials.

== Kranji War Cemetery ==
The War Cemetery is the final resting place for 4,458 Allied servicemen in marked graves laid out in rows on maintained and manicured lawns. Over 850 of these graves are unidentified.

Towards the north end of the cemetery grounds is the State Cemetery, where Yusof bin Ishak and Benjamin Henry Sheares, the first and second presidents of Singapore, are buried. To the west are the Military Graves for Commonwealth soldiers who died during the Konfrontasi and Malayan Emergency. 69 Chinese servicemen who served as members of the Commonwealth forces and who were killed by the Japanese in February 1942 were buried at the Chinese Memorial. There are also 64 burials for World War I, including special memorials for three men who were buried in civil cemeteries in Singapore and Saigon, and whose graves were impossible to locate until this day.

Previously a hospital burial ground during the Japanese occupation of Singapore, it became a military cemetery at the end of the war. Military servicemen buried elsewhere in Singapore were exhumed and reburied at the memorial. The names of Indian servicemen were inscribed on the memorial walls as they had already been cremated, as is customary in Hinduism.

== Gallery ==
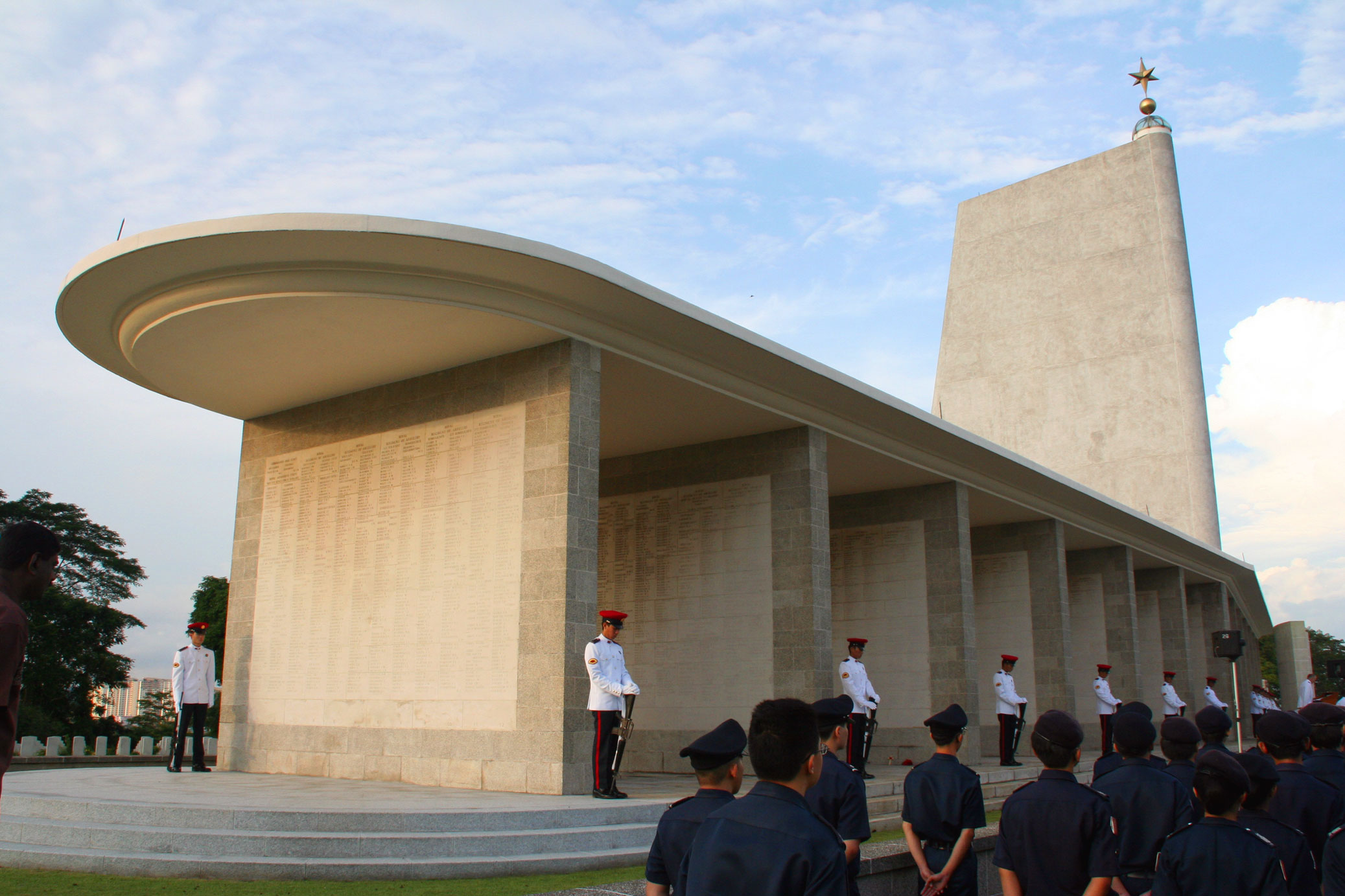
The Kranji War Memorial during the Remembrance Day Ceremony proceedings on 13 November 2005

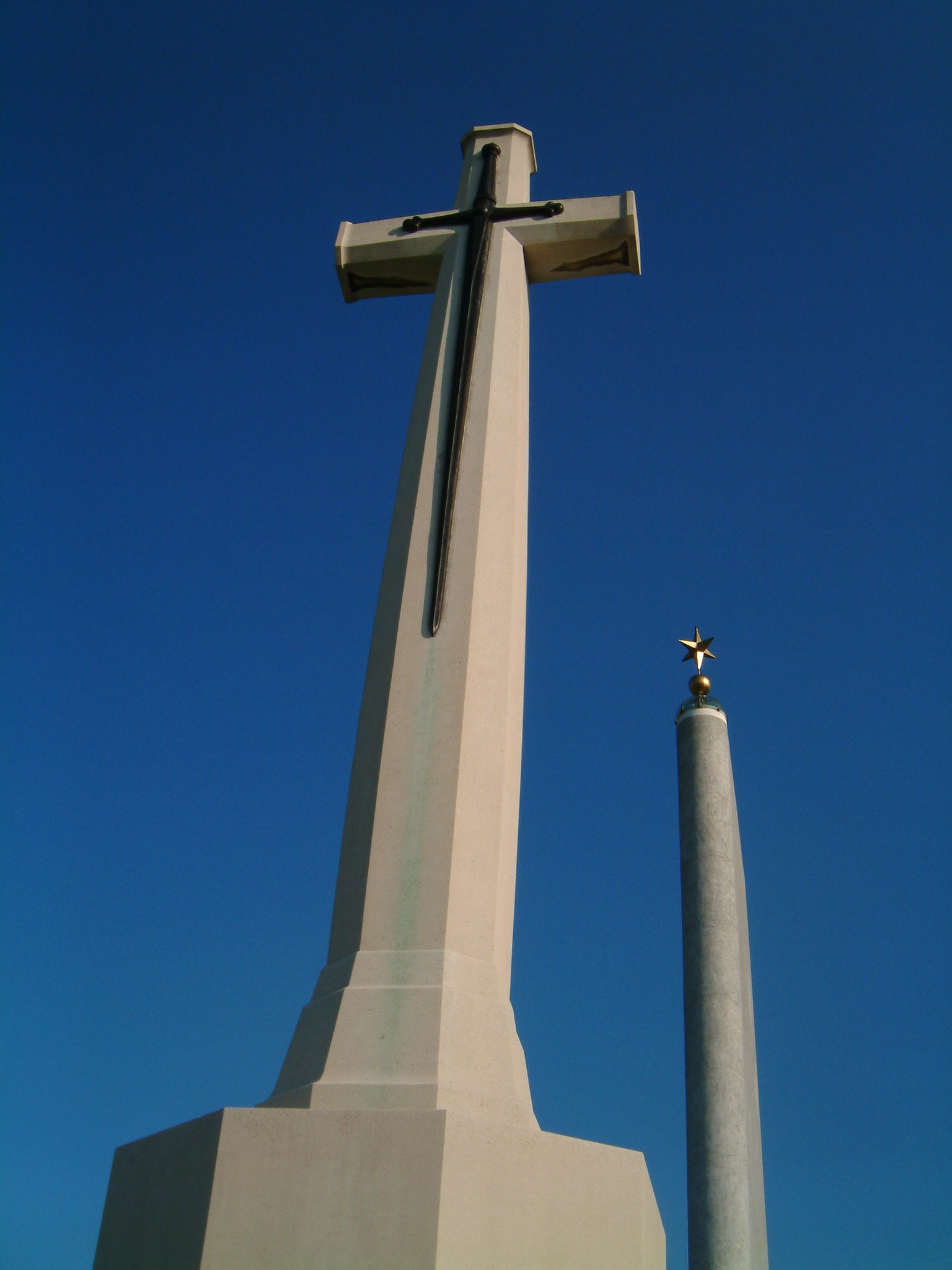
Kranji War Memorial Cross

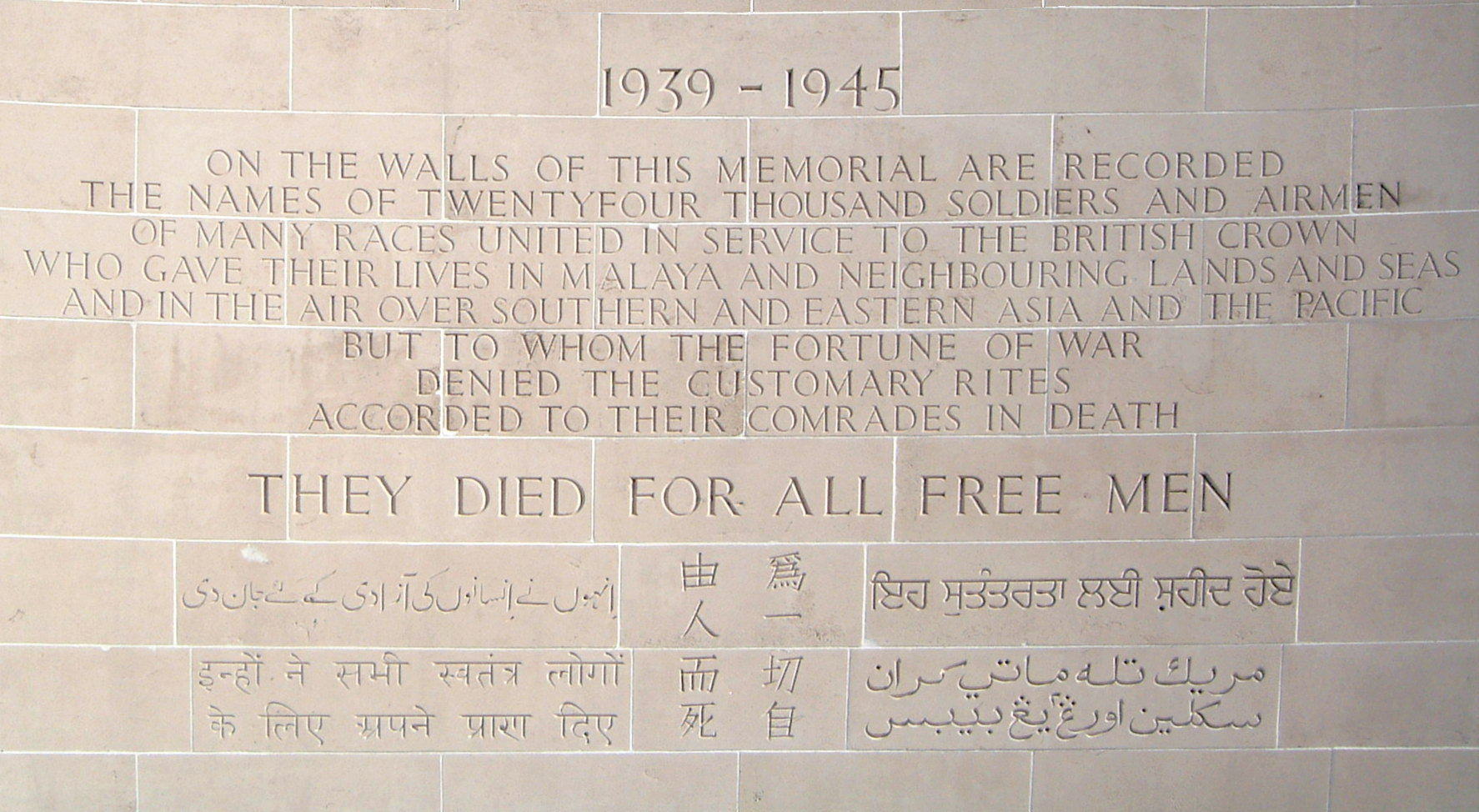
Kranji War Memorial inscription

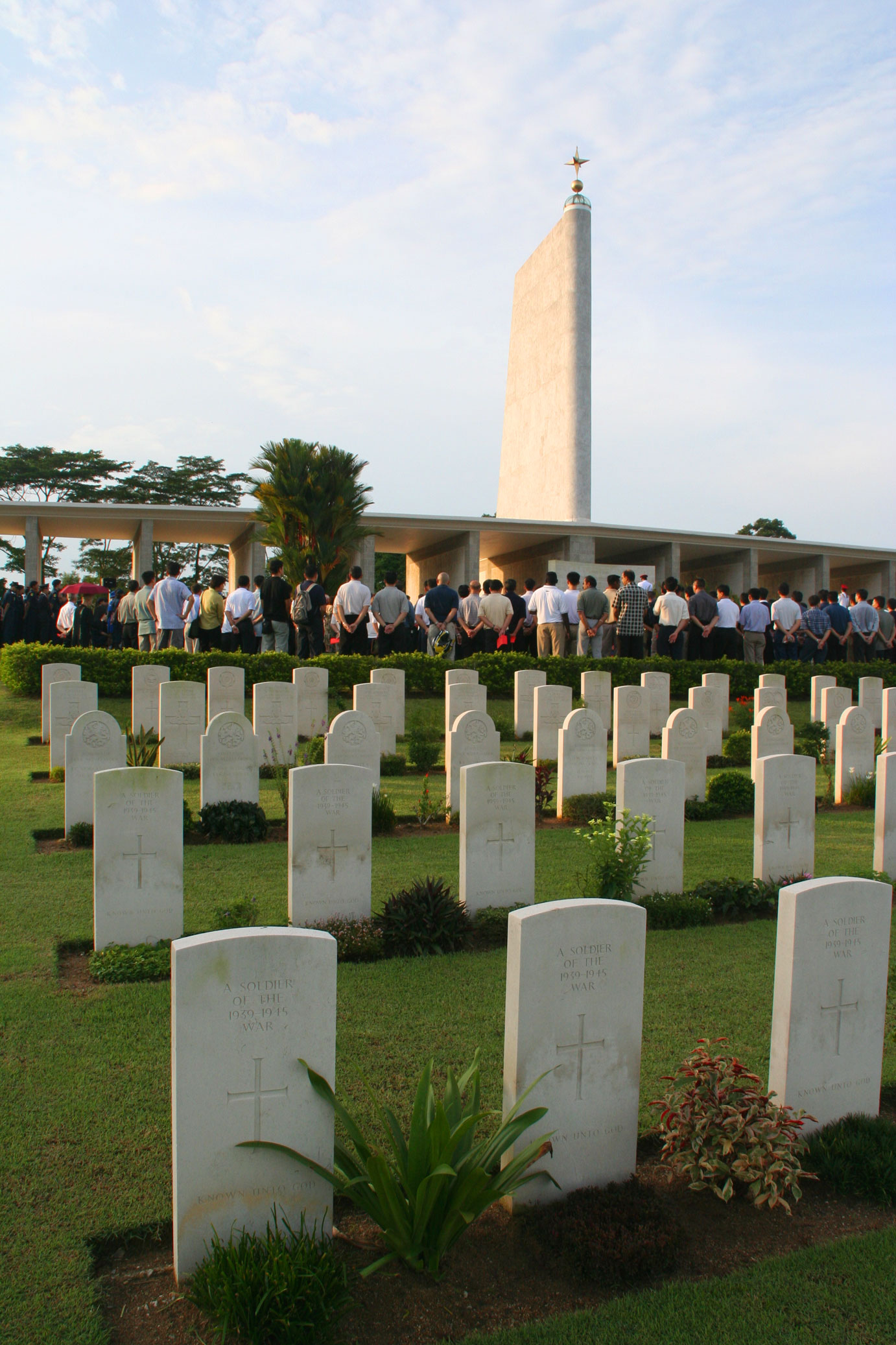
Kranji War Memorial Cross of Sacrifice

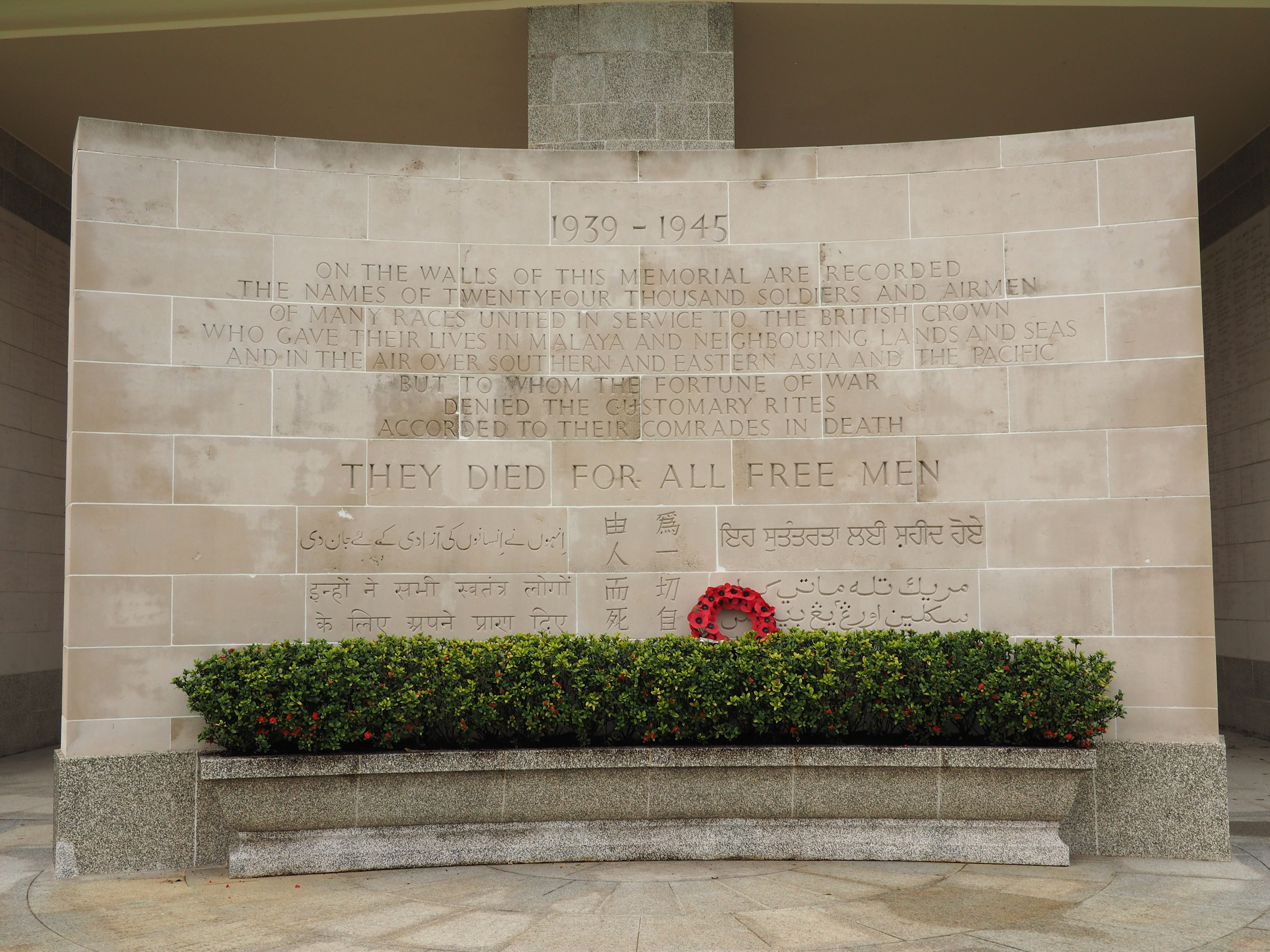
The inscription on the Kranji War Memorial

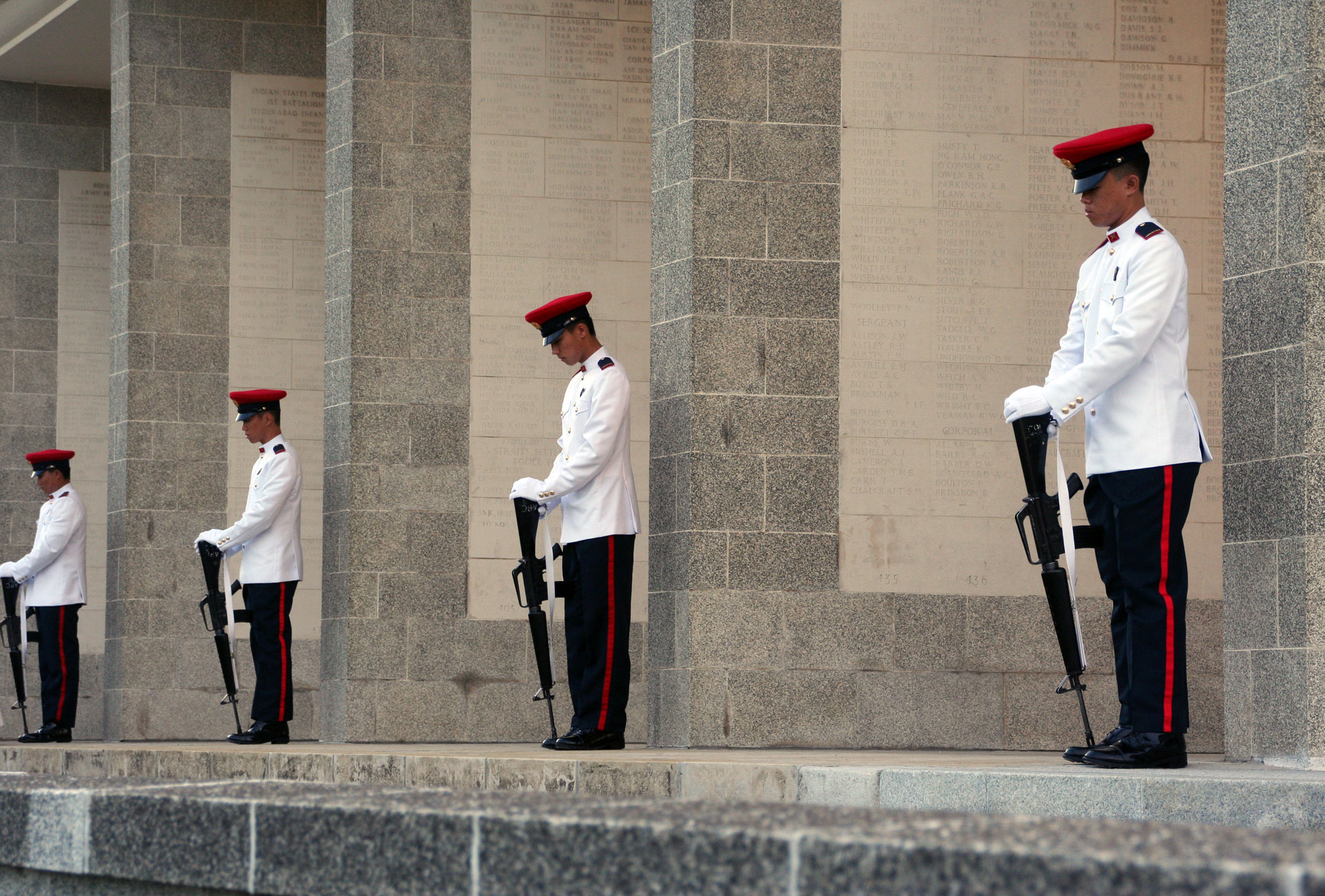
The Catafalque Party mounted by the Singapore Armed Forces Military Police at the Kranji War Memorial during Remembrance Day

== See also ==
- The Cenotaph, Singapore
- Former Indian National Army Monument
- Civilian War Memorial
