= Shahid-e-Bharat =

- The Shahid-e-Bharat medal.
- Type: Medal
- Awarded for: The Fallen
- Presented by: Azad Hind
- Eligibility: Soldiers of the Indische Legion, Indian National Army, and the Wehrmacht.
- Status: Currently not existent.
- First award: Second World War
- Final award: Second World War

Highlights
- Total: Unknown
- Total awarded posthumously: Unknown

Precedence
- Next (higher): Vir-e-Hind
- Next (lower): Tamgha-e-Bahaduron

The Shahid-e-Bharat (Martyr of India) was a military decoration awarded by the Azad Hind Government to honour the fallen. It was awarded in gold or in silver. First instituted by Subhas Chandra Bose in Germany, it was later also awarded to troops of the Indian National Army in South East Asia. The award could be conferred with swords for valour in combat, and without swords for non-combat awards.

It ranked below the Vir-e-Hind (Hero of India) award. The medal was round and the obverse held the text "AZAD HIND" with a lion's head above and fler-de-lys below. The reverse had the German text "Indiens Freiheits Kampf" (India's fight for freedom) over a gridded background.

== See also ==
- Indian National Army
- Indische Legion
