= Tamgha-e-Bahaduron =

Military decoration awarded by the Azad Hind Government

- The Tamgha-e-Bahaduron medal.
- Type: Medal
- Awarded for: Soldiers Medal
- Presented by: Azad Hind
- Eligibility: Soldiers of the Indische Legion, Indian National Army, and the Wehrmacht.
- Status: Currently not existent.
- First award: Second World War
- Final award: Second World War

Highlights
- Total: Unknown
- Total awarded posthumously: Unknown

Precedence
- Next (higher): Shahid-e-Bharat
- Next (lower): None

The Tamgha-e-Bahaduron (Medal of Soldiers) was a military decoration awarded by the Azad Hind Government. First instituted by Subhas Chandra Bose in Germany, it was later also awarded to troops of the Indian National Army in South East Asia. The award could be conferred with swords for valour in combat, and without swords for non-combat awards.

== See also ==
- Indian National Army
- Indische Legion
