= Bahadur Group =

The Bahadur Group, or the Special Services Group as it was initially formed, was a commando unit within the Indian National Army (INA) that was tasked with frontline military intelligence as well as subversion and sabotage operations behind enemy lines. This was the INA's second commando unit, besides the Intelligence group led by colonel Shaukat Hayat Malik of Bahawalpur Regiment, who is credited with raising the flag of Azad Hind in Moirang on 14 April 1944, an event accepted as one of the first instances of the liberation of Indian soil by an independent Indian government.

They were two parts to the organization: the Special Service Group and the Secret Service Group. Both of these groups were trained in commando style raids tactics, defusing and disposal of bombs and land mines, jungle warfare, long-range penetration missions in India, maneuver warfare, military communications, military intelligence gathering, military logistics, psychological warfare, reconnaissance, and tactical emergency medical while some members received training in Linguistics in order to liaison with local Japanese units. Usually operating in groups of 8 to 10 members of the Bahadur group were attached to local Japanese divisions in order to spread propaganda among Indian troops in the British Indian army and to act as pathfinders.
