= Vir-e-Hind =

- Type: Medal.
- Awarded for: Distinguished service.
- Presented by: Azad Hind
- Eligibility: Soldiers of the Indische Legion, Indian National Army, and the Wehrmacht.
- Status: Currently not existent.
- First award: Second World War
- Final award: Second World War

Highlights
- Total: Unknown
- Total awarded posthumously: Unknown
- Total recipients: Shangara Singh Mann

Precedence
- Next (higher): Sardar-e-Jung
- Next (lower): Shahid-e-Bharat

The Vir-e-Hind (Warrior of India) was a military decoration awarded by the Azad Hind Government. During World War II, Netaji Subhas Chandra Bose's Provisional Government of Free India (Azad Hind Government) bestowed the Vir-e-Hind military honor. It was one of numerous awards given to Indian National Army (INA) soldiers in recognition of their valor and service.

== History ==
When the Azad Hind Government was founded in Singapore in 1943 with assistance from Imperial Japan, the Vir-e-Hind award was made. The award was a component of the provisional government's efforts to create a symbolic framework of national identity and sovereignty for a future independent India, along with other military awards like the Sher-e-Hind and Shahid-e-Hind medals.

== Rank ==
The award was a second class star below the award of Sardar-e-Jung. First instituted by Subhas Chandra Bose in Germany, it was later also awarded to troops of the Indian National Army in South East Asia.

The award could be conferred with swords for valour in combat, and without swords for non-combat awards.

At least one award was made, to Captain Shangara Singh Mann. He was also awarded the Sardar-e-Jung medal.

== Design ==
While several variants of INA medals exist, Vir-e-Hind medals typically featured designs associated with the Azad Hind movement, including:

- Emblems linked to INA insignia
- Nationalist symbols representing an undivided India
- Motifs reflecting the ethos of the independence struggle

Some medals and other Azad Hind insignia were manufactured in Germany and Japan during 1943–44.

== Collectors and exhibitions ==
Vir-e-Hind medals are rare and highly valued among collectors of wartime memorabilia. Collector Prithwish Dasgupta, based in Baguiati, West Bengal, acquired a Vir-e-Hind medal from a war medal specialist in the United Kingdom. Dasgupta’s private collection of INA and Netaji Subhas Chandra Bose memorabilia has been showcased in exhibitions, including at Mother’s Wax Museum in New Town, Kolkata.

His collection also includes:

- Azad Hind stamps printed in Nazi Germany in 1943
- Coins issued by the Provisional Government of Free India
- Currency notes featuring Netaji
- Letters, receipts, and documents related to INA activities in Burma (1942–44)

== See also ==
- Indian National Army
- Indische Legion
