= Sher-e-Hind =

- The Sher-e-Hind award with swords.
- Type: Neck order / Medal.
- Awarded for: Valour
- Presented by: Azad Hind
- Eligibility: Soldiers of the Indische Legion, Indian National Army, and the Wehrmacht.
- Status: Currently not existent.
- First award: Second World War
- Final award: Second World War

Highlights
- Total: Unknown
- Total awarded posthumously: Unknown
- Total recipients: Captain Baru Singh; Captain Ganeshi Lal; Captain Kanwal Singh

Precedence
- Next (higher): None
- Next (lower): Sardar-e-Jung

The Sher-e-Hind (Tiger of India) was the highest military decoration awarded by the Imperial Japanese supported Azad Hind Government, established in Singapore in 1943. First instituted by Subhas Chandra Bose in Nazi Germany, this award was later also awarded to troops of the Indian National Army in South East Asia. The award could be conferred with swords for valour in combat, and without swords for non-combat awards. At least three awards were made, to Captain Baru Singh, Captain Kanwal Singh and one to Captain Ganeshi Lal.

== See also ==
- Indian National Army
- Indische Legion
