= Shaukat Malik =

Colonel Shaukat Ali Malik was an officer of the Indian National Army notable for having led a unit of the Bahadur Group in the capture of Moirang during the initial phases of the INA's Imphal Campaign during World War II. Moirang was the first territory within India to be captured by the INA and also the first place within the mainland of India to be held by the Azad Hind Government. Col. Malik Commander of the Intelligence (Bahadur) Group of INA, planted the Indian tricolor flag (with springing tiger) at the sacred place of Moirang Kangla on 14 April 1944 at about 5 pm, where he would also narrate the history of the Azad Hind Fauj. Malik was awarded the Sardar-e-Jung for leading his troops into Moirang. Prior to joining the INA, Shaukat Malik fought in the Burma theatre as an officer in the Bahawalpur State Forces.
