= Kit (given name) =

Kit is a given name. It can be short for Christopher, Katherine, Kathleen, Kitty, among others.

== People ==
- Kit Ahern (1915–2007), Irish politician
- Kit Armstrong (born 1992), American-born pianist and composer
- Kit Bond (born 1939), American politician and U.S. Senator from Missouri
- Kit Burns (1831–1870), American gang leader
- Kit Carson (1809–1868), American frontiersman
- Kit Chan (born 1972), Singaporean singer
- Kit Coleman (1864–1915), Canadian journalist
- Kit Connor (born 2004), English actor
- Kit Cope (born 1977), American kickboxer
- Kit Culkin (born 1944), American actor
- Kit Denton (1928–1997), Australian writer
- Kit Fine (born 1946), British philosopher
- Kit Harington (born 1986), English actor
- Kit Hesketh-Harvey (1957–2023), British comedian
- Kit Hiller (born 1948), Australian linocut printer and oil painter
- Kit Hoover (born 1970), American television reporter
- Kit Hung (born 1977), Hong Kong filmmaker
- Kit Klein (1910–1985), American speed skater
- Kit Lambert (1935–1981), British record producer
- Kit Lathrop (born 1956), American National Football League player
- Kit Malthouse (born 1966), British Member of Parliament, former Deputy Mayor of London
- Kit Pearson (born 1947), Canadian writer
- Kit Pedler (1927–1981), British television writer
- Kit Pongetti (born 1970), American actress
- Kit Reed (1932–2017), American writer
- Kit Symons (born 1971), Wales footballer
- Kit Taylor (born 1956), American, COO of New York Magazine
- Kit Thompson (born 1997), Filipino actor and model
- Kit Watkins (born 1953), American jazz musician
- Kit West (1936–2016), British special effects artist
- Kit Williams (born 1946), British illustrator
- Kit Woolsey (born 1943), American bridge and backgammon player
- Kit Young (born 1994), British actor

== Fictional characters ==
- Kit, in the books Dark Lord of Derkholm and Year of the Griffin
- Kit, in the film Failure to Launch
- Kit, protagonist of Gameoverse
- Kit, in the animated series Jentry Chau vs. the Underworld
- Kit Ballard, protagonist of Blade Kitten
- Kit Bellew, protagonist of Smoke Bellew
- Kit Carruthers, in the film Badlands
- Kit Casey, in The Creature Cases
- Kit Cloudkicker, in the Disney cartoon TaleSpin
- Kit De Luca, in the film Pretty Woman
- Kit Fisto, Jedi Knight in the Star Wars series
- Kit Herondale, in The Dark Artifices trilogy by Cassandra Clare
- Christopher "Kit" Julian, in Thomas Hardy's novel The Hand of Ethelberta
- Kit Keller, in the film A League of Their Own
- Kit Kittredge, in the American Girl doll and book series
- Kit Latura, in the film Daylight
- Kit McGraw, in the television series Nip/Tuck
- Kit Nelson, in the TV series Alcatraz
- Kit Oxenford, in Ken Follett's novel WhiteOut
- Rielle "Kit" Peddler, in the Android: Netrunner universe
- Kit Porter, in the television series The L Word
- Kit Ramsey, in the film Bowfinger
- Christopher "Kit" Rodriguez, in the Young Wizards novel series
- Kit Ryan, from the comic series Hellblazer
- Kit Snicket, in the novels A Series of Unfortunate Events
- Kit Tanthalos, in the TV series Willow
- Kit Taylor, in the TV series Kamen Rider: Dragon Knight
- Kit Tyler, in Elizabeth George Speare's novel The Witch of Blackbird Pond (1959)
- Kit Walker, in the TV series American Horror Story
- Kit Walker, alias of fictional comic book character The Phantom
- Prince Kit, in the 2015 Disney film Cinderella
- Kitsunami the Fennec, or Kit, a character from the IDW Publishing comic series Sonic the Hedgehog
- Kit, a legendary brawler from the game Brawl Stars
- Kit the Fox, Mozilla's Firefox Mascot Mozilla Firefox

== See also ==
- Kit (disambiguation)
- Kito (disambiguation)
- Kitt (disambiguation)
- Kitty (disambiguation)
