= Kit =

Kit may refer to:

== People and fictional characters ==
- Kit (given name), a list of people and fictional characters with the given name or nickname
- Kit (surname), a list of people

== Places ==
- Kit, Iran, a village in Mazandaran Province
- Kit Hill, Cornwall, England

== Animals ==
- Young animals:
  - A short form of kitten, a young cat
  - A beaver
  - A ferret
  - A fox
  - A mink
  - A rabbit
  - A raccoon
  - A skunk
  - A squirrel
  - A wolverine
- Old collective noun for a group of pigeons flying together

== Sporting attire and equipment ==
- Kit (association football)
- Kit (cycling)
- Kit (rugby football)

== Other uses ==
- List of storms named Kit, various cyclones
- Kit (of components)
- Kit lens, a low-end SLR camera lens
- Kit Mountain, a mountain in Texas
- Kit violin or kit, a small stringed musical instrument
- Whale (film) (Bulgarian: Kit), a 1970 Bulgarian comedy film
- Russian submarine Kit, an Imperial Russian Navy submarine launched in 1915

== See also ==
- KIT (disambiguation)
- Kits (disambiguation)
- Kitt (disambiguation)
- St. Kitts, an island in the Caribbean Sea
