= Kitts =

Kitts may refer to:

- Kitts (surname)
- Saint Kitts, an island in the West Indies
  - Saint Kitts and Nevis, the island nation
- HMS St. Kitts (D18), a Battle-class destroyer of the Royal Navy (RN)

== See also ==
- Kitts Green, area of Birmingham, England
- Kitts Hill, Ohio, USA
- Kitts Hummock, Delaware, USA
- Kitt (disambiguation)
