= Kits =

Kits may refer to:

- Kitsilano, a neighbourhood of the city of Vancouver, British Columbia, Canada
- Kits, an American taffy candy made by Gilliam Candy Company
- KITS, a San Francisco, California radio station
- Kottayam Institute of Technology & Science, a college in Pallickathode, India

== See also ==
- Saint Kitts
- Kit's Coty, a small village in the English county of Kent
- Kit (disambiguation)
- KIT (disambiguation)
- Kitsune
