= Kit (surname) =

Kit (Ukrainian: Кіт) is a surname. Notable people with the surname include:

- Andriy Kit (born 1971), Ukrainian politician
- Barys Kit (1910–2018), Belarusian-American rocket scientist
- Daniel-Leon Kit (born 1998), American actor
- Kristen Kit (born 1988), Canadian athlete
- Tetyana Kit (born 1994), Ukrainian wrestler

== See also ==
- Kateryna Kit-Sadova (born 1974), Ukrainian art critic
