= Warner Robins, Georgia =

City in Georgia, United States

Warner Robins
- City
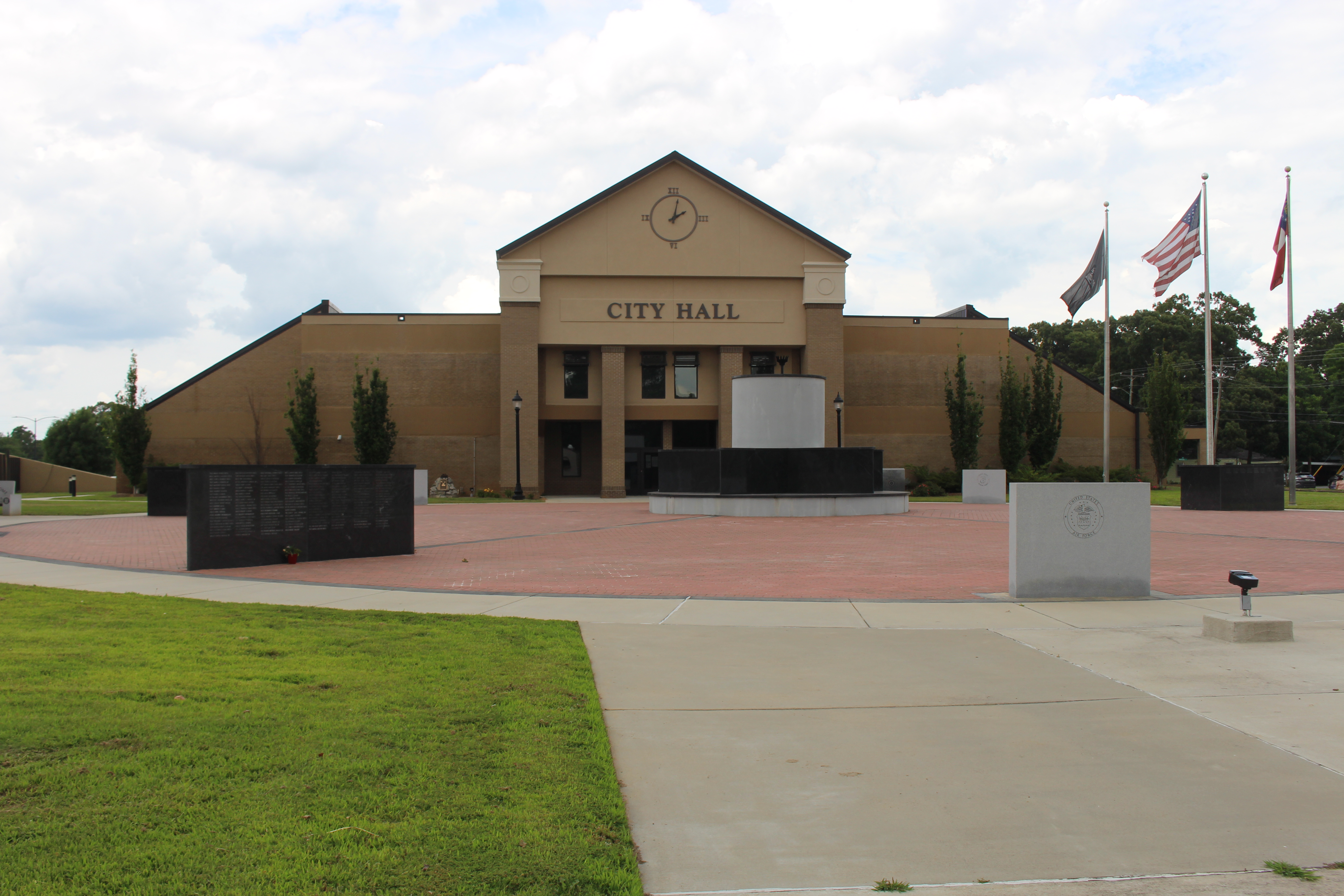
- Warner Robins City Hall

- Flag Seal
- Nicknames: The International City
- Motto: Every Day In Middle Georgia Is Armed Forces Appreciation Day (EDIMGIAFAD)
- Location in Houston County and the state of Georgia
- Coordinates: 32°36′31″N 83°38′17″W
- Country: United States
- State: Georgia
- Counties: Houston, Peach
- Founded: September 1, 1942

Government
  - Mayor: LaRhonda Patrick

Area
  - City: 38.10 sq mi (98.68 km^{2})
  - Land: 37.78 sq mi (97.85 km^{2})
  - Water: 0.32 sq mi (0.83 km^{2}) 0.8%
- Elevation: 305 ft (93 m)

Population (2020)
  - City: 80,308
  - Density: 2,126/sq mi (820.7/km^{2})
  - Metro: 179,605
- Time zone: UTC−5 (Eastern)
  - Summer (DST): UTC−4 (Eastern)
- ZIP Code: 31088, 31093, 31095, 31098, 31099
- Area code: 478
- FIPS code: 13-80508
- GNIS feature ID: 0333366
- Website: wrga.gov

Warner Robins (WRB; typically /ˈwɑːrnɜːr ˈrɑːbənz/ waw-rnur-RAW-binz) is a city in Houston and Peach Counties in the U.S. state of Georgia. It is the state's 11th-largest incorporated city, with a population of 85,830 according to the World Population Review.

The city is the main component of the Warner Robins metropolitan statistical area, including Houston, Peach, and Pulaski Counties, which had a census population of 191,619 in 2020. It is a component of the Macon–Warner Robins–Fort Valley combined statistical area, with an estimated 2018 population of 423,572. Robins Air Force Base, a U.S. Air Force maintenance and logistics complex that was founded as the Warner Robins Air Depot in October 1942, is located east of the city limits. The base's expansion and the suburbanization of nearby Macon have led to the city's growth in the post-World War II era.

== History ==
Warner Robins was founded in 1942, when the small farming community of Wellston was renamed for General Augustine Warner Robins (1882–1940) of the United States Army Air Corps, which later became the United States Air Force. It was incorporated as a town in March 1943 and as a city in 1956.

The 1940 census shows that the community of Wellston was sparsely populated and inhabited primarily by farmers and their families. Its most notable landmark was a stop on the railroad line. Wellston also had a small sawmill and a grocery store. Peach orchards covered parts of the surrounding land.

This changed during World War II. The War Department made plans to build an air depot in the Southeast. With the assistance of influential U.S. Representative Carl Vinson, Wellston community leader Charles Bostic "Boss" Watson worked with officials in Macon to make a bid to locate this air depot in Houston County. In June 1941, the U.S. government accepted this offer, which included 3,108 acres (12.58 km^{2}) of land.

This air force base was initially called Wellston Army Air Depot when it opened in 1942. The first commander was Colonel Charles E. Thomas. He wanted to name this depot in honor of his mentor Augustine Warner Robins, who was called by his middle name, Warner. Regulations prevented him from doing this, which required the base to be named after the nearest town. Not deterred by this, Colonel Thomas persuaded Boss Watson and the other community leaders to rename the town of Wellston. So on September 1, 1942, the town was given the new name of Warner Robins. Soon thereafter, on October 14, 1942, the base was renamed to become Warner Robins Army Air Depot. The city has a unique name, shared with no other town in the United States.

Robins Air Force Base is not within the city limits of the town, but is across U.S. Highway 129 (Georgia State Highway 247), which serves as a boundary between the base and the city.

In 2018, First Solar announced a project for a 200-megawatt, 2,000-acre (8.1 km^{2}) solar-panel facility in Twiggs County east of Warner Robins. The facility would be the largest solar facility in the Southeast US.

=== Tornadoes ===
Tornadoes have continually plagued the city since its inception with the 1950s, with at least four catastrophic tornadoes striking the area. The first one occurred on April 30, 1953, when an F4 tornado with winds exceeding 200 mph hit the city and portions of Robins Air Force Base, killing 18 people and injuring 300 more. That same day, a second tornado, rated F2, damaged the northwest side of town. Ten months later, on March 13, 1954, a long-tracked F1 tornado struck the town, killing one and injuring five. Three years later, on April 5, 1957, an F2 tornado family hit the northwest side of the city, causing significant infrastructure damage. There have been over 100 confirmed tornadoes within a 25-mile radius of Warner Robins since 1950.

== Geography ==
Warner Robins is located at 32°36′31″N 83°38′17″W (32.608720ºN, −83.638027ºE). It is approximately 20 miles (32 km) south of Macon and 100 miles (160 km) south of Atlanta. According to the United States Census Bureau, the city has a total area of 35.4 square miles (92 km^{2}), of which 0.3 mi^{2} (0.78 km^{2}) (0.82%) is covered by water.

=== Climate ===
Warner Robins has a humid subtropical climate (Köppen Cfa). It experiences hot, humid summers and generally mild winters, with average high temperatures ranging from 92.0 °F (33.3 °C) in the summer to 58.0 °F (14.4 °C) high during winter. Snowfall is a moderately rare event. Warner Robins-area historical tornado activity is slightly above the state average. It is 86% greater than the overall U.S. average.

Climate data for Warner Robins, Georgia
Month	Jan	Feb	Mar	Apr	May	Jun	Jul	Aug	Sep	Oct	Nov	Dec	Year
Record high °F (°C)	84 (29)	85 (29)	90 (32)	96 (36)	99 (37)	106 (41)	108 (42)	105 (41)	102 (39)	100 (38)	88 (31)	82 (28)	108 (42)
Mean daily maximum °F (°C)	58 (14)	62 (17)	70 (21)	77 (25)	85 (29)	90 (32)	92 (33)	91 (33)	86 (30)	77 (25)	69 (21)	60 (16)	76 (25)
Mean daily minimum °F (°C)	35 (2)	38 (3)	44 (7)	50 (10)	59 (15)	68 (20)	71 (22)	70 (21)	64 (18)	53 (12)	43 (6)	36 (2)	53 (12)
Record low °F (°C)	−6 (−21)	9 (−13)	14 (−10)	28 (−2)	40 (4)	46 (8)	54 (12)	55 (13)	35 (2)	26 (−3)	10 (−12)	5 (−15)	−6 (−21)
Average precipitation inches (mm)	4.2 (110)	4.5 (110)	4.6 (120)	3.0 (76)	2.7 (69)	4.1 (100)	5.0 (130)	4.1 (100)	3.6 (91)	2.8 (71)	3.3 (84)	4.0 (100)	45.9 (1,161)
Source: City-data.com, the Weather Channel (records only)

== Demographics ==
Historical population
Census	Pop.	Note	%±
1940	50		—
1950	7,986		15,872.0%
1960	18,633		133.3%
1970	33,491		79.7%
1980	39,893		19.1%
1990	43,726		9.6%
2000	48,804		11.6%
2010	66,588		36.4%
2020	80,308		20.6%
2025 (est.)	87,761	▲	9.3%
U.S. Decennial Census; 1850-1870 1870-1880; 1890-1910 1920-1930; 1940 1950 1960; 1970 1980 1990; 2000 2010 2020; 2025

Local sources indicate that Warner Robins had a population of 50 in 1940. Warner Robins first appeared in the 1950 U.S. census.

=== Racial and ethnic composition ===
Warner Robins, Georgia – Racial and ethnic composition Note: the US Census treats Hispanic/Latino as an ethnic category. This table excludes Latinos from the racial categories and assigns them to a separate category. Hispanics/Latinos may be of any race.
Race / Ethnicity (NH = Non-Hispanic)	Pop 2000	Pop 2010	Pop 2020	% 2000	% 2010	% 2020
White alone (NH)	29,538	33,304	33,491	60.52%	50.02%	41.70%
Black or African American alone (NH)	15,504	24,379	32,936	31.77%	36.61%	41.01%
Native American or Alaska Native alone (NH)	135	184	160	0.28%	0.28%	0.20%
Asian alone (NH)	861	1,730	2,949	1.76%	2.60%	3.67%
Pacific Islander alone (NH)	33	59	54	0.07%	0.09%	0.07%
Other race alone (NH)	80	105	375	0.16%	0.16%	0.47%
Mixed race or multiracial (NH)	797	1,738	3,836	1.63%	2.61%	4.78%
Hispanic or Latino (any race)	1,856	5,089	6,507	3.80%	7.64%	8.10%
Total	48,804	66,588	80,308	100.00%	100.00%	100.00%

=== 2020 census ===
As of the 2020 census, 80,308 people resided in the city. The median age was 34.1 years. 26.3% of residents were under the age of 18 and 12.0% of residents were 65 years of age or older. For every 100 females there were 89.5 males, and for every 100 females age 18 and over there were 85.3 males age 18 and over.

There were 31,644 households and 19,256 families in Warner Robins; 35.1% had children under the age of 18 living in them. Of all households, 38.3% were married-couple households, 20.3% were households with a male householder and no spouse or partner present, and 34.7% were households with a female householder and no spouse or partner present. About 30.0% of all households were made up of individuals and 8.9% had someone living alone who was 65 years of age or older.

There were 34,191 housing units, of which 7.4% were vacant. The homeowner vacancy rate was 1.8% and the rental vacancy rate was 7.3%.

99.8% of residents lived in urban areas, while 0.2% lived in rural areas.

Racial composition as of the 2020 census
Race	Number	Percent
White	34,667	43.2%
Black or African American	33,343	41.5%
American Indian and Alaska Native	297	0.4%
Asian	2,983	3.7%
Native Hawaiian and Other Pacific Islander	66	0.1%
Some other race	2,857	3.6%
Two or more races	6,095	7.6%
Hispanic or Latino (of any race)	6,507	8.1%

=== 2019 estimate ===
Around 2019, of the 66,588 residents, 66,224 of them were in Houston County and 364 were in Peach County.

=== Quality of life ===
In 2009, Business Week magazine named Warner Robins the best place in Georgia to raise a family. The ranking was bestowed again for 2010. The Warner Robins Area Chamber was named one of the top-three chambers of commerce in the U.S. for a chamber in its division in 2009 by the American Chamber of Commerce Executives Association. In 2012, CNN Money named Warner Robins No. 7 on its Best Places To Live list for America's best small cities.

== Government ==
Warner Robins is governed by a mayor and a six-member city council, four of whom are elected by district and two of whom are elected at-large. LaRhonda Patrick has been mayor since 2022, after defeating incumbent Randy Toms in a November 2021 runoff election. Patrick is the first woman and first person of color to be elected mayor of Warner Robins.

Since 2013, most of the city is within the 147th district of the Georgia House of Representatives, currently represented by Republican member Bethany Ballard.

== Transportation ==
=== Major roads ===
Warner Robins is generally located between U.S. Highway 129/Georgia State Route 247 and Interstate 75 about 6 miles (10 km) to the west; Georgia State Route 96 passes through the southern edge of the city. U.S. Highway 129 leads north 19 mi (31 km) to downtown Macon and south 28 mi (45 km) to Hawkinsville. GA-247 follows U.S. Highway 129 throughout the city, and leads north to Macon and south to Hawkinsville. GA-96 leads east-northeast 27 mi (43 km) to Jeffersonville and west 20 mi (32 km) to Fort Valley.

=== Pedestrians and cycling ===
- The Walk at Sandy Run
- Walker's Pond Trail
- Wellston Trail

== Arts and recreation ==
=== Museum of Aviation ===
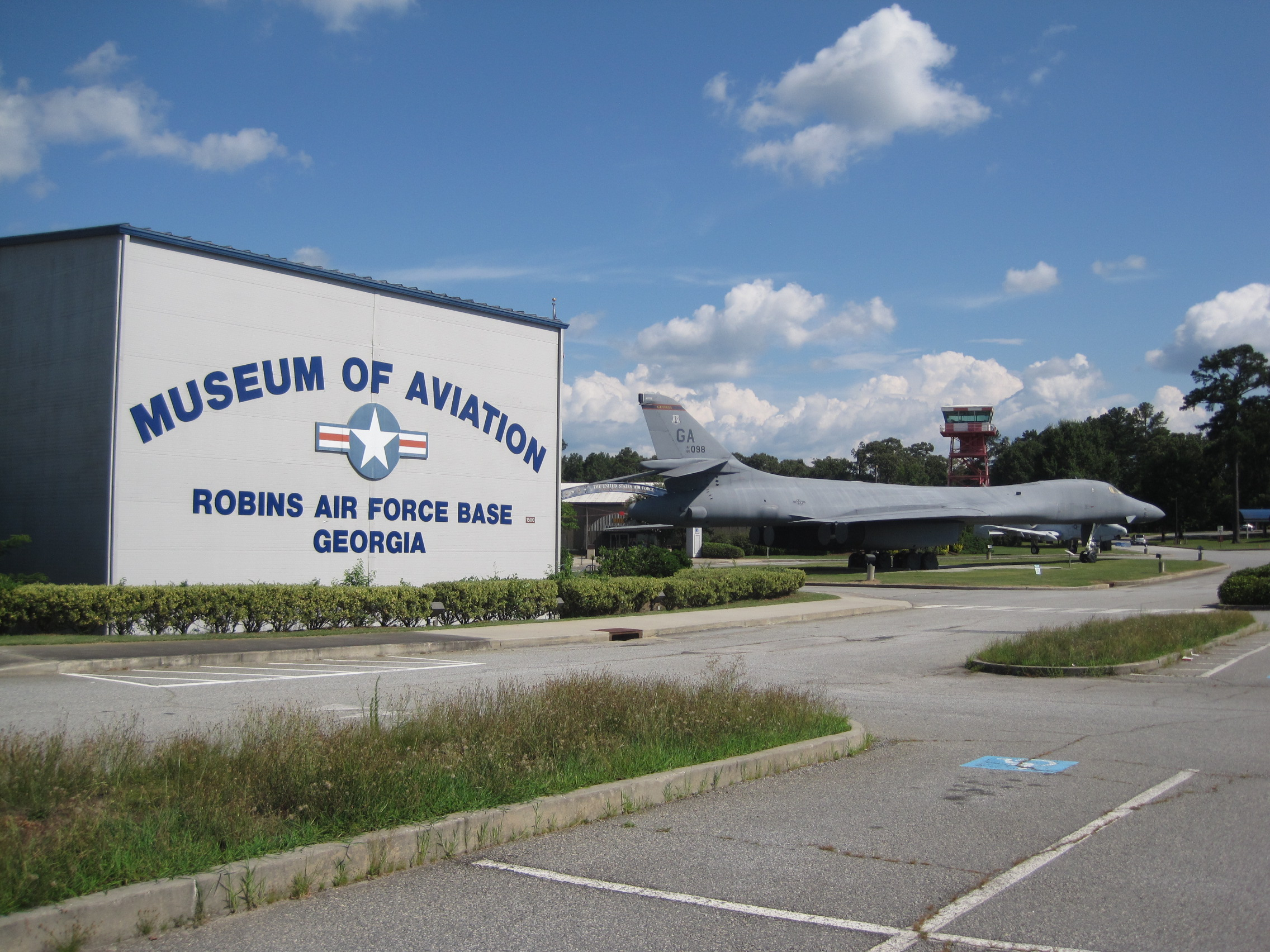
Museum of Aviation at Robins Air Force Base

Warner Robins is home to the Museum of Aviation, which honors the history of military aviation. Located next to the air force base, the museum contains exhibits on military memorabilia, airplanes and ground vehicles, the Tuskegee Airmen, and Operation Desert Storm. It is the second-largest museum sponsored by the United States Air Force and the fourth-most visited museum in the Department of Defense. It is also the largest tourist attraction outside Atlanta in Georgia.

=== Baseball and softball ===
According to Warner Robins residents, Claude Lewis, director of the Warner Robins Recreation Department, invented the game of tee-ball in 1958. The first game was played in March of that year with 20 children participating. Lewis wrote rules for the new game and sent rule books out to recreation departments all over the country. In 2006, a field was dedicated and named for Lewis, "the father of tee-ball", at the Warner Robins American Little League complex.

Warner Robins American Little League won the 2007 Little League World Series, defeating Tokyo Kitasuna Little League of Tokyo, Japan 3–2 in the final. Dalton Carriker hit a walk-off home run in the bottom of the sixth inning to win the game for Georgia.

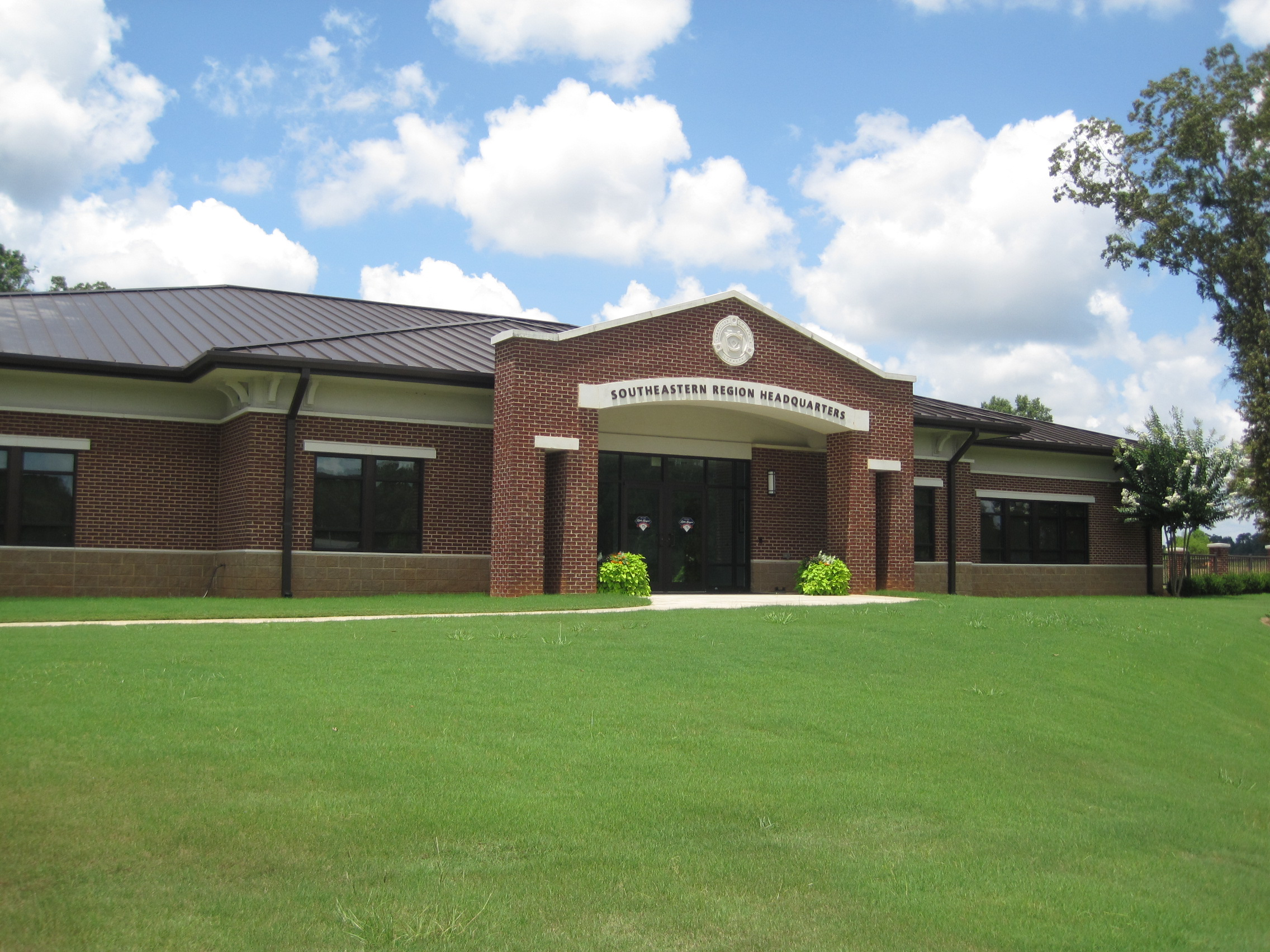
Southeast Region Headquarters of Little League

On December 9, 2008, the Little League International Board of Directors unanimously voted for Warner Robins to become the new Southeast Region Headquarters of Little League baseball and softball. Games began to be played in Warner Robins in 2010.

The Warner Robins American Little League girls' softball team won the 2009 Little League Softball World Series by defeating Crawford, Texas, making Warner Robins the only Little League to have won both a baseball and a softball title.

The Warner Robins American Little League girls' softball team defended their 2009 championship by defeating Burbank, California, in the 2010 Little League Softball World Series. By doing so, Warner Robins became only the fourth Little League program to produce back-to-back championship teams, and the first since Waco, Texas, which had won in 2003 and 2004.

== Economy ==
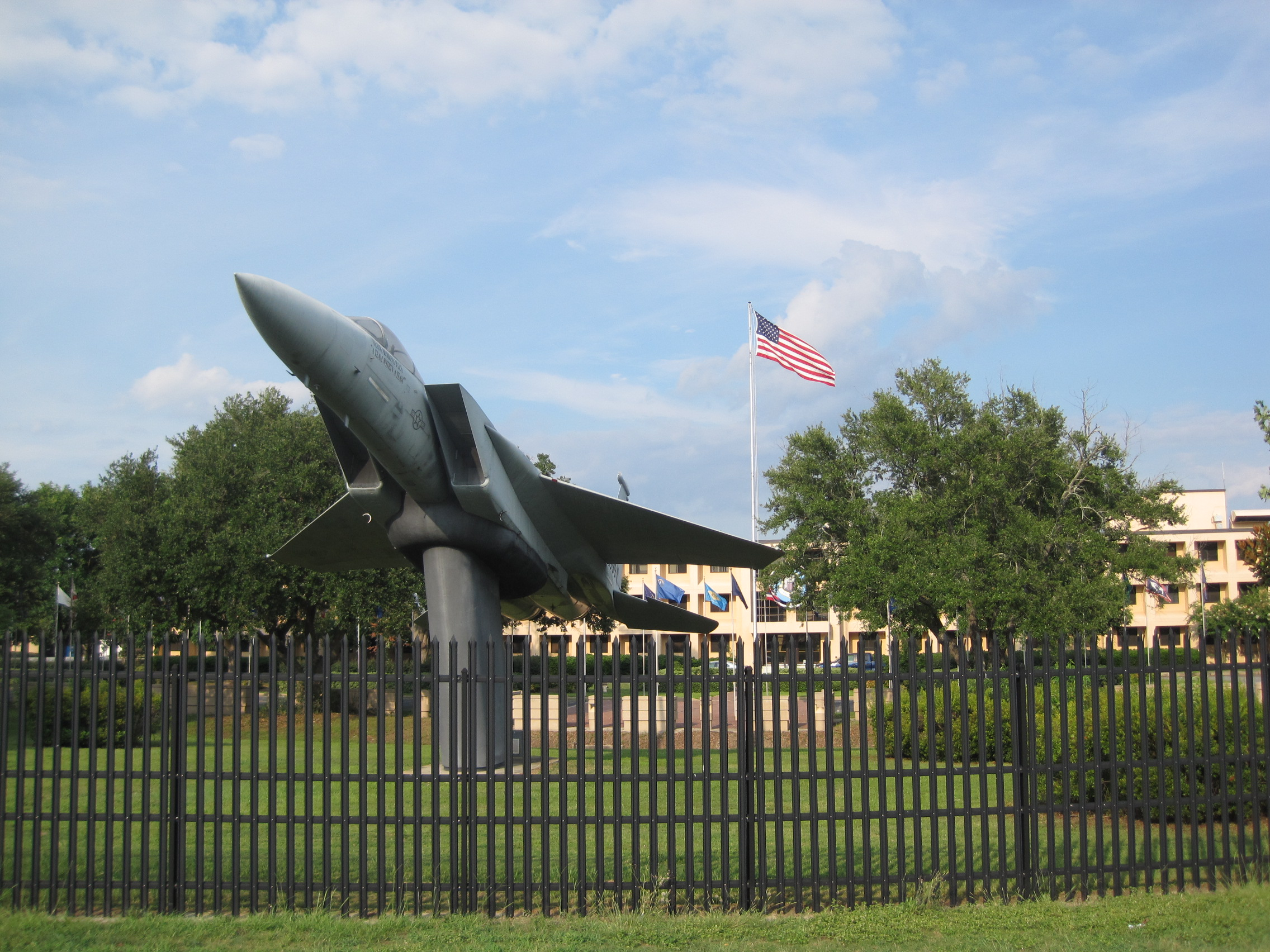
View of Robins Air Force Base from Warner Robins

Robins Air Force Base is one of the largest employers in Georgia and directly contributes over 25,000 military, civil service, and contractor jobs to the local economy. It has provided economic stability for Warner Robins that has benefited the entire Middle Georgia community.

The city of Warner Robins is working on redeveloping and renewing areas that have suffered from urban decay and/or abandonment through neglect and city growth. The city's plans include development of a centralized downtown center "for pedestrian-oriented businesses, culture and community gathering" to be re-established at Commercial Circle to "connect commerce and culture back to Downtown."

In June 2011, Warner Robins was listed in Wired as one of 12 small cities that are driving the "Knowledge Economy". Georgia was the only Southeastern state listed, and Warner Robins was one of two Georgia cities ranked (the other one being Hinesville-Ft. Stewart). The rankings featured small cities that are luring knowledge workers and entrepreneurs, and which have both a relatively high median family income and a relatively high percentage of creative workers who drive the economy.

== Houston Medical Center ==
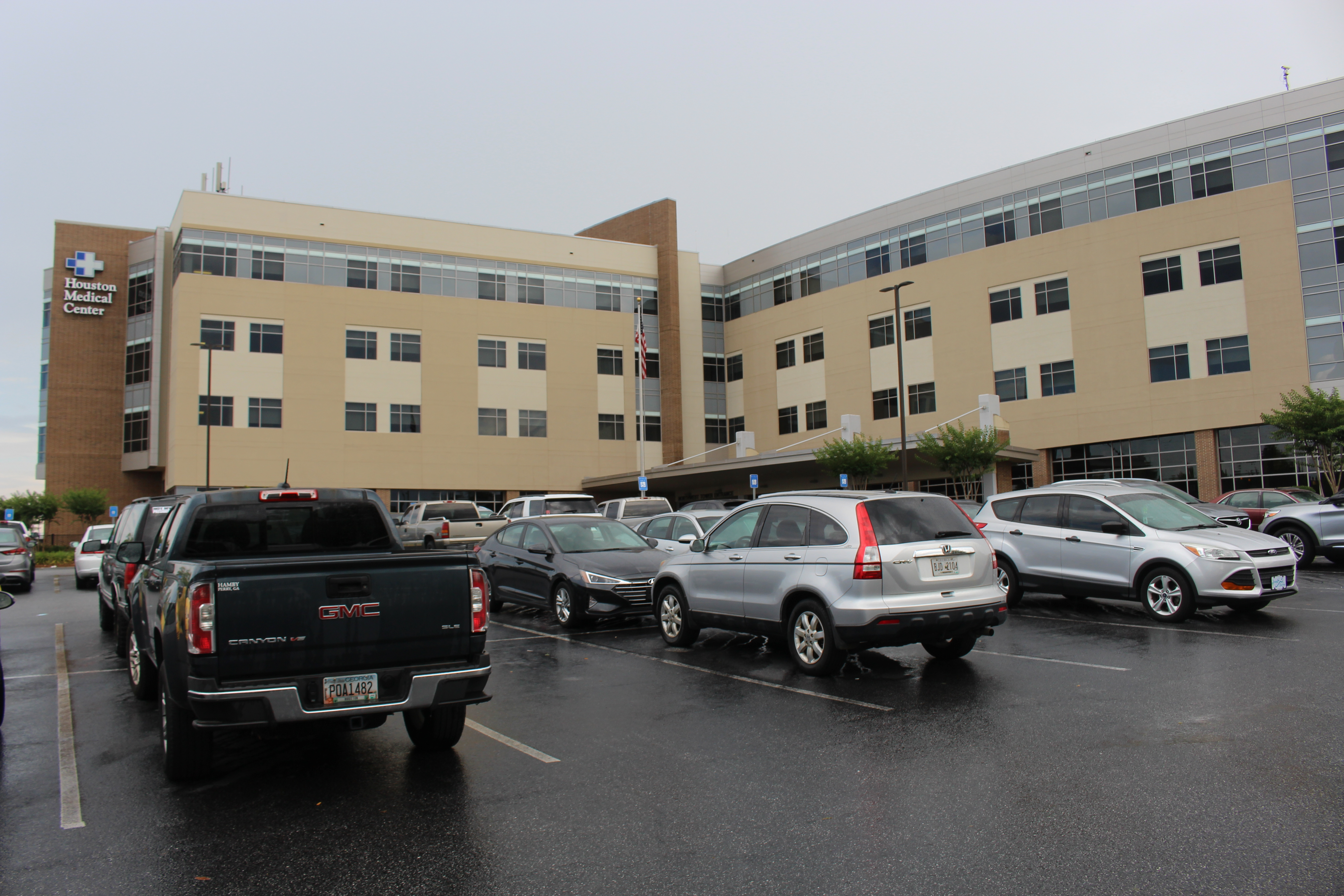
Houston Medical Center on Watson Boulevard

Houston County Hospital was dedicated on July 2, 1960, with 50 beds. The hospital was renamed Houston Medical Center in 1986 after renovations. The patient rooms were converted at this time from semi private to private, with 186 beds available. The addition of a new five-story northwest tower was completed in 2009, making a total of 237 beds. Houston Medical Center is part of the Houston Healthcare system, which serves over 300,000 people annually.

== Warner Robins Little Theatre ==
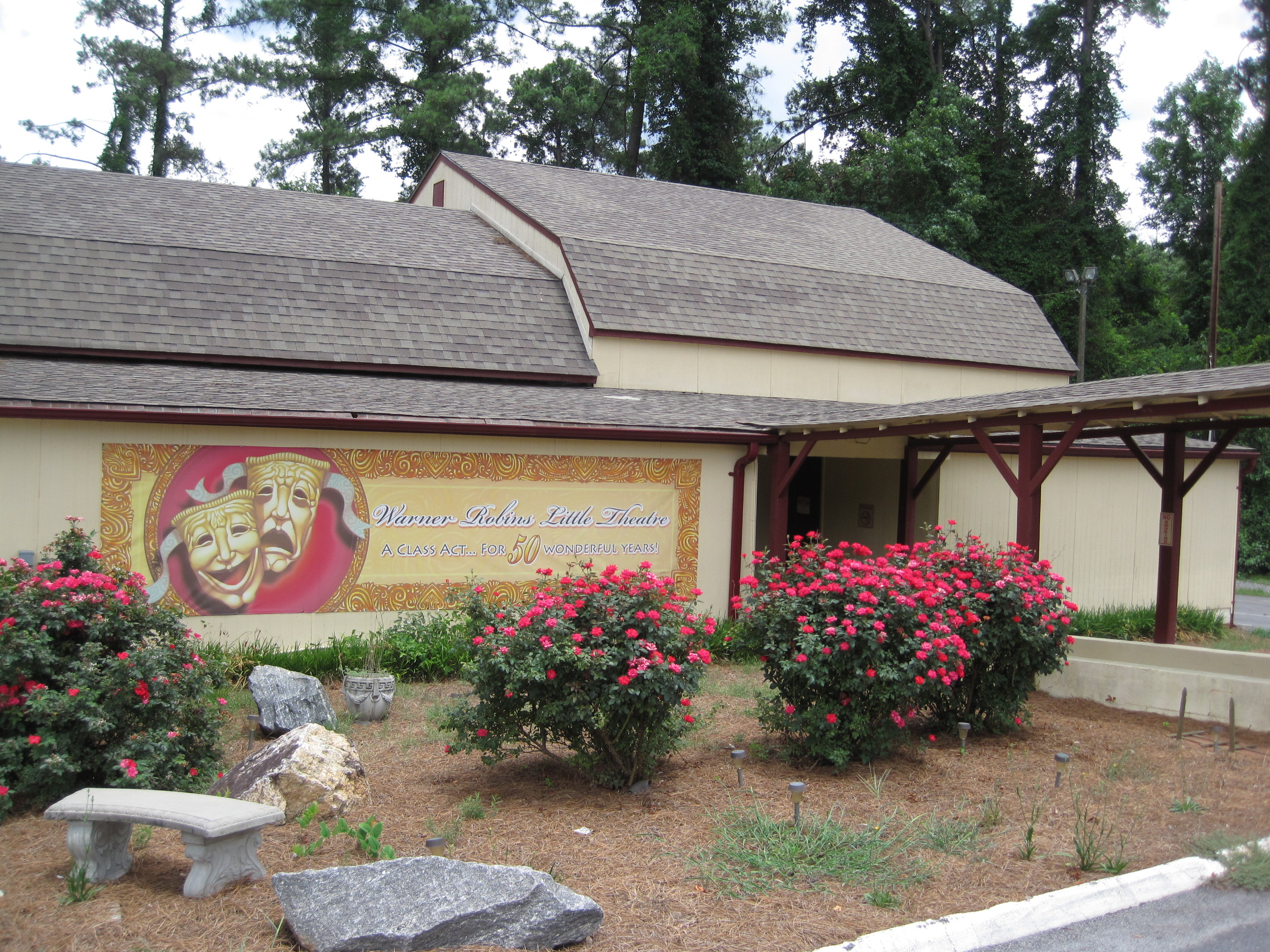
Warner Robins Little Theatre playhouse

The Warner Robins Little Theatre was established in 1962 as a nonprofit community theatre, and now owns its theatre playhouse debt-free. The theatre continues to thrive. Five main shows are produced every year. Occasionally, workshops and other special events are held for the Middle Georgia community.

== Gallery ==
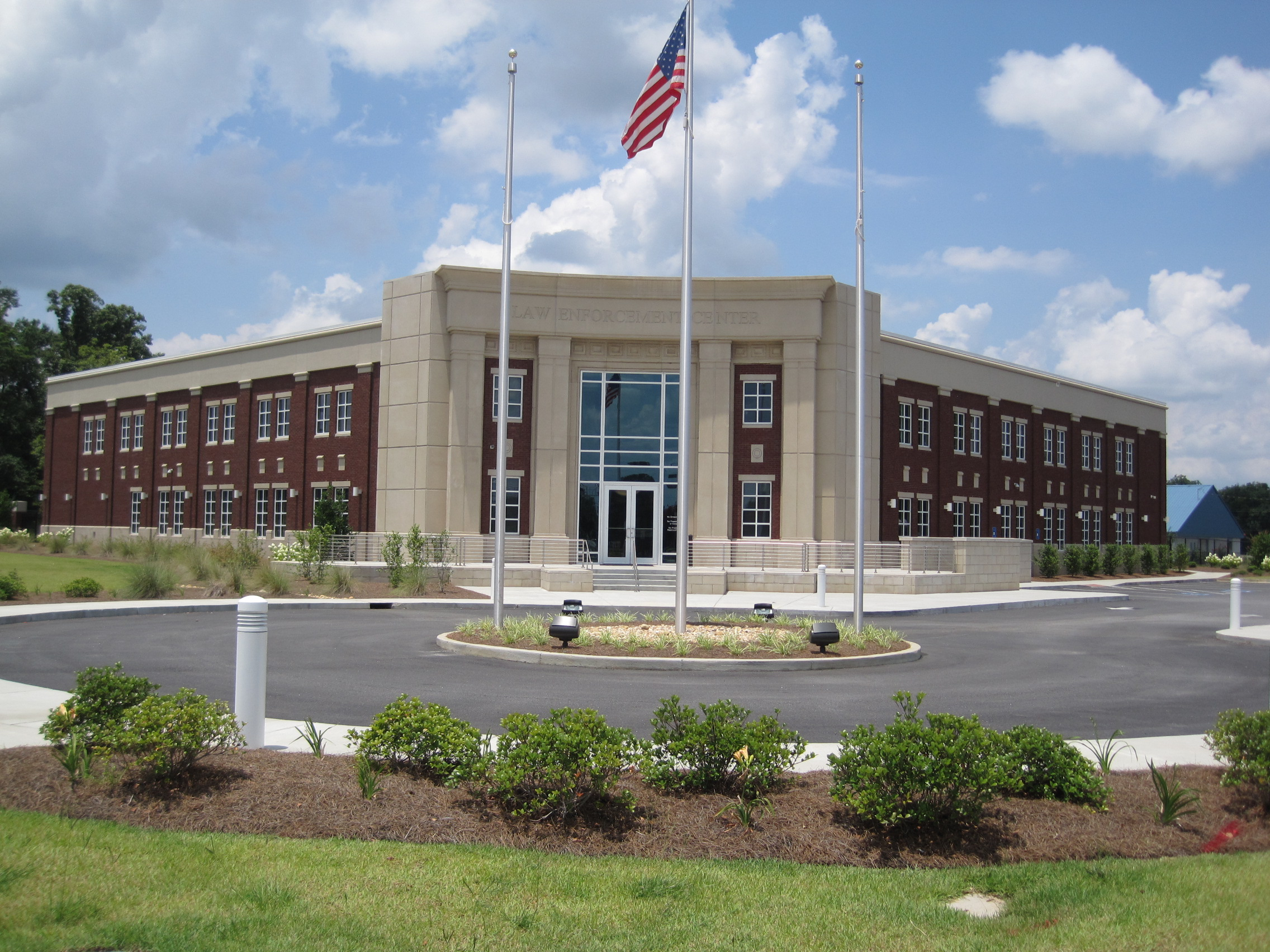
Warner Robins Law Enforcement Center

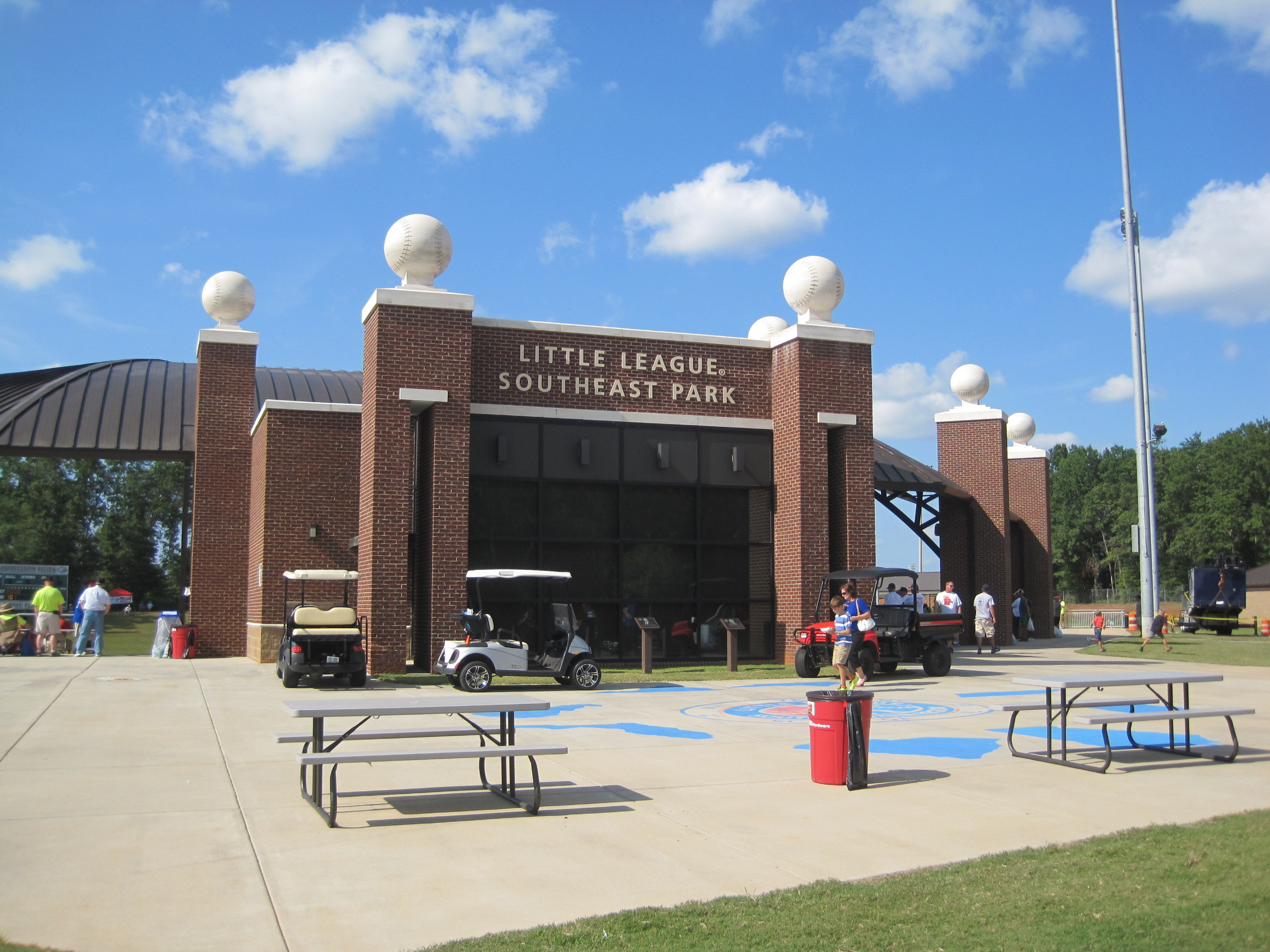
Southeastern Region Little League Stadium

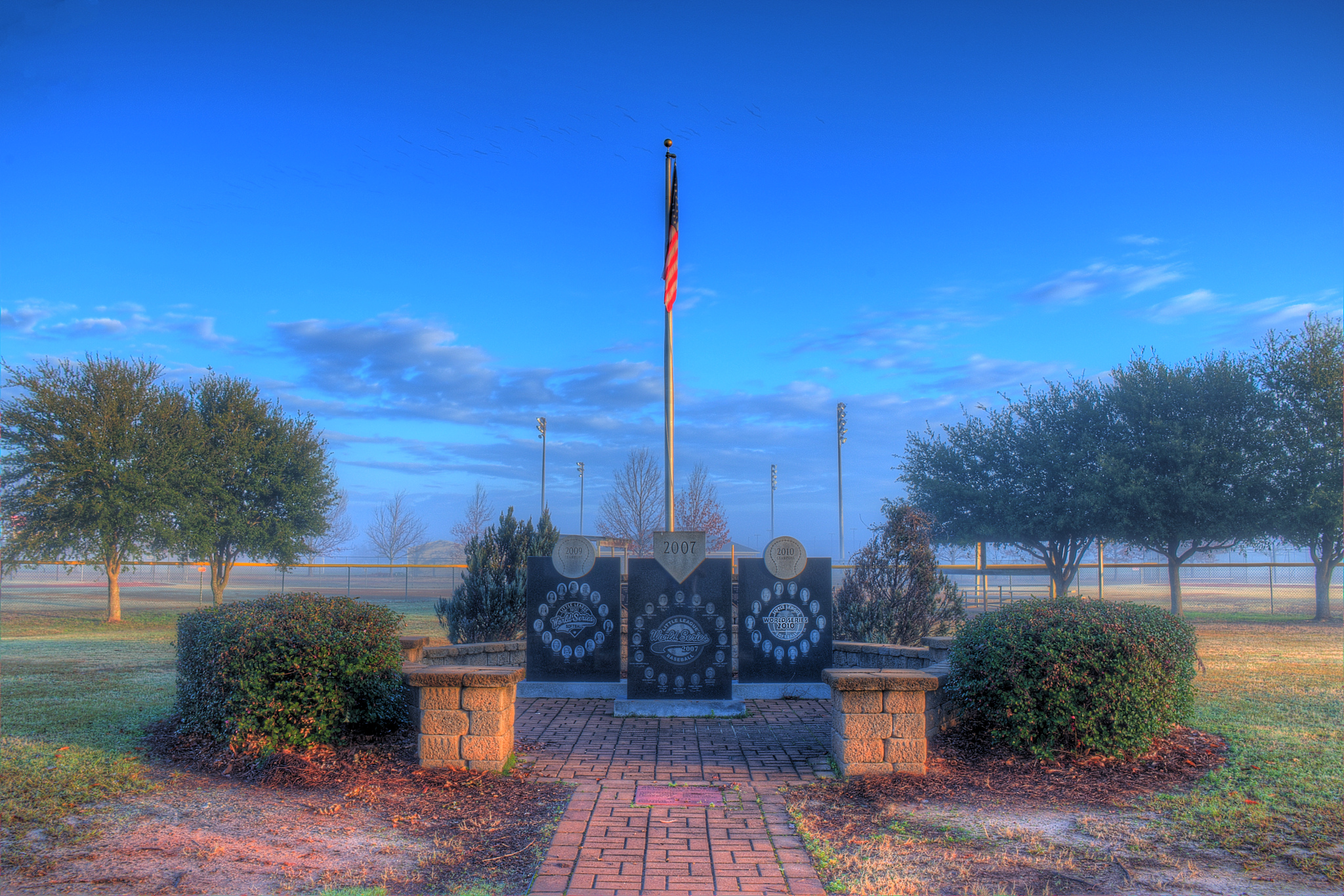
Little League World Series display

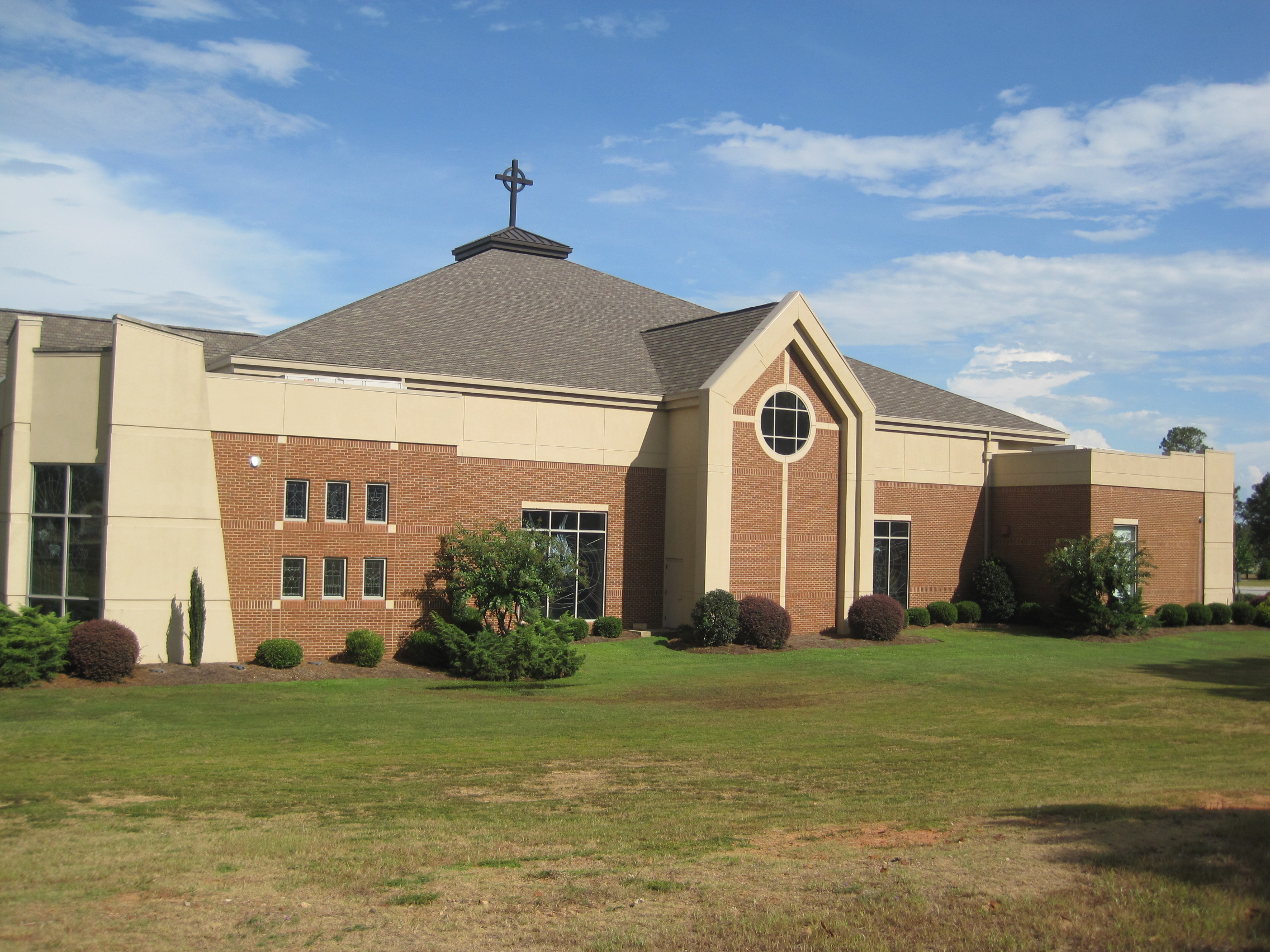
Sacred Heart Catholic Church on Davis Drive

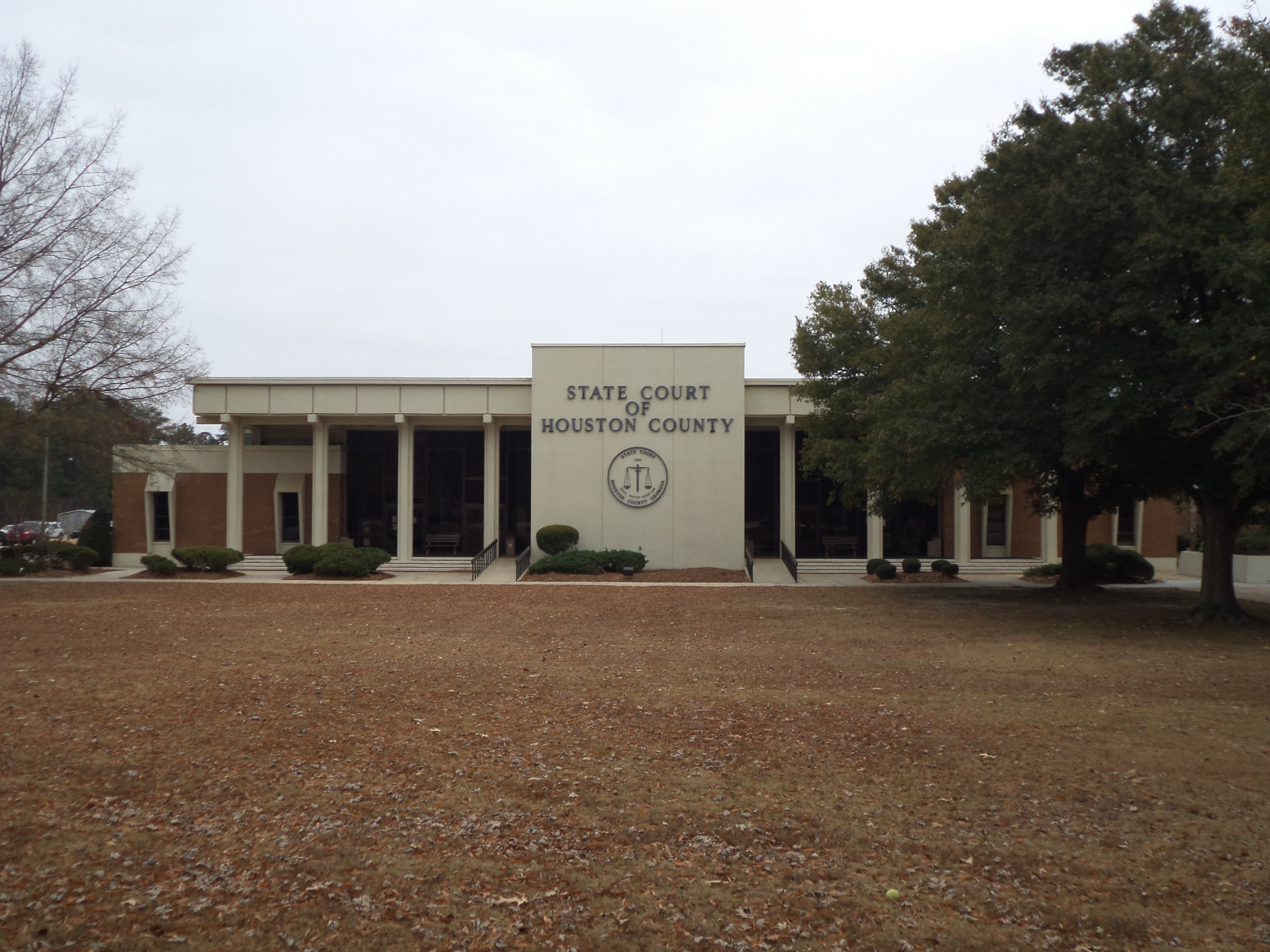
State Court of Houston County

== Local media ==
=== Newspapers ===
- The Telegraph, daily
- The Sun, a section of the Telegraph printed weekly devoted to news in Houston and Peach Counties
- Houston Home Journal, twice weekly, the legal organ for Houston County

=== Television stations ===
Warner Robins is part of the Macon designated market area, which is the nation's 120th-largest television market.

=== Radio stations ===
Warner Robins is part of the Macon Arbitron Metro, which is the nation's 130th-largest radio market with a person 12+ population of 372,400.

== Education ==
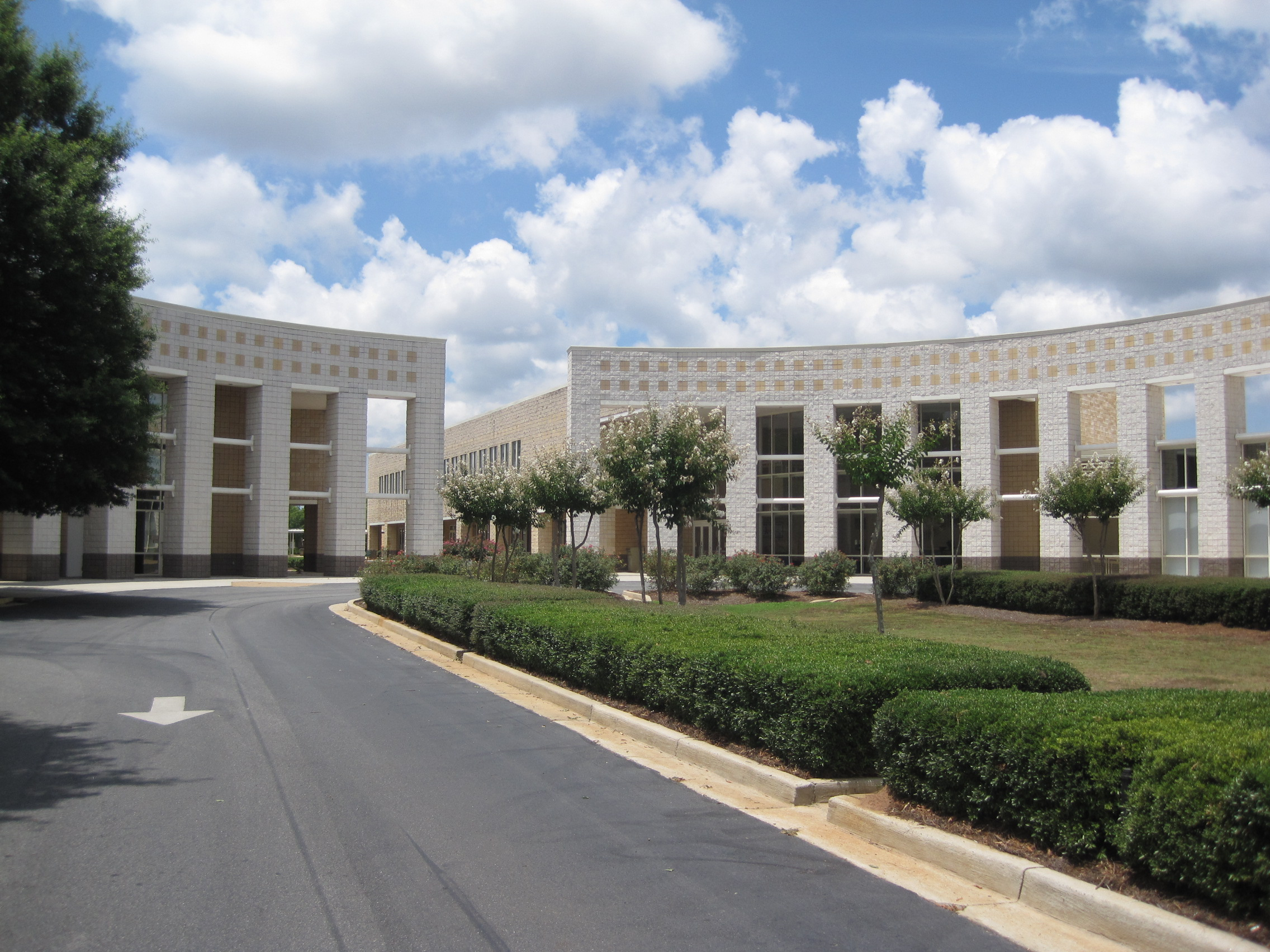
Warner Robins campus of Central Georgia Technical College

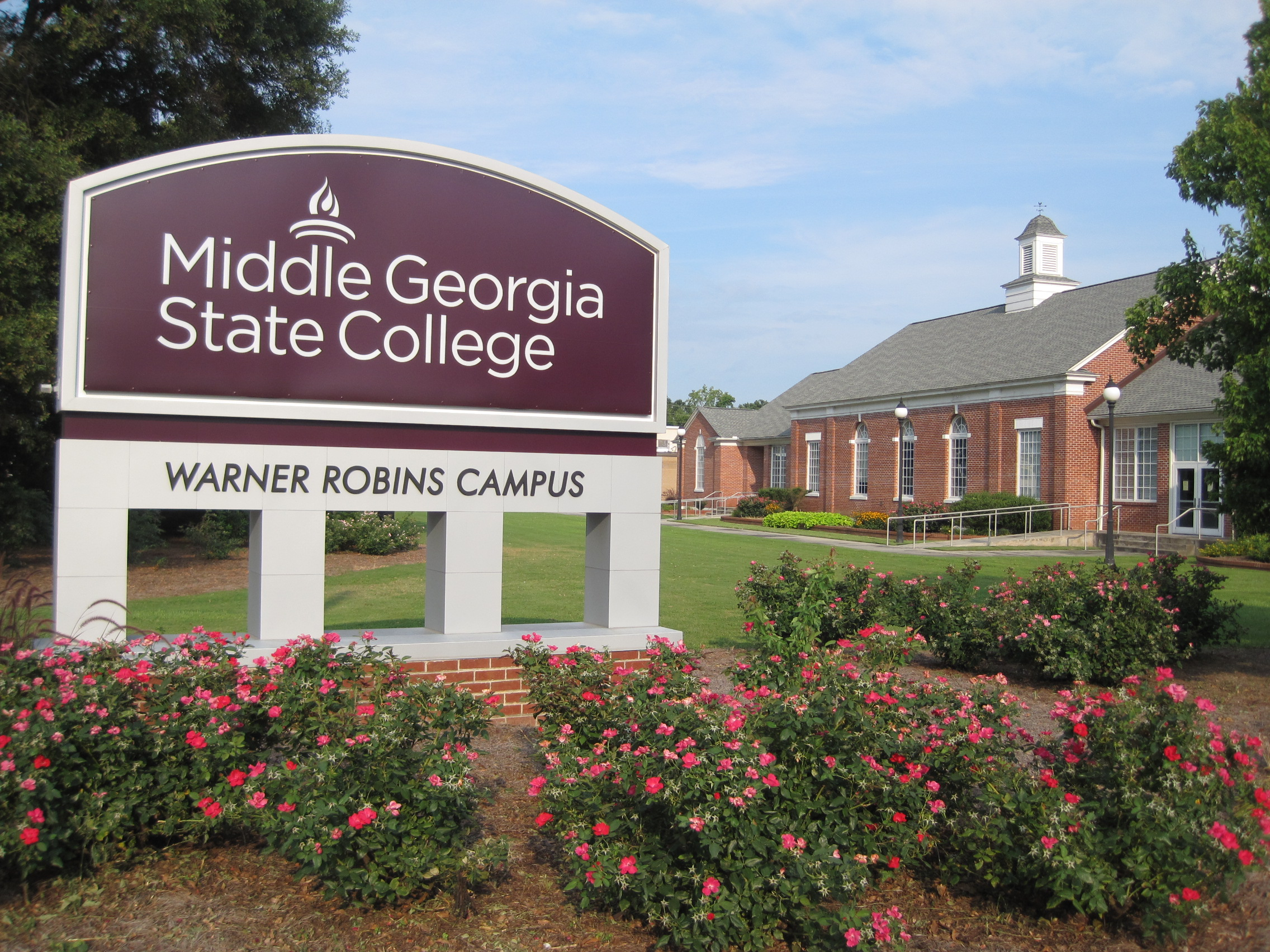
Middle Georgia State College in Warner Robins

The portion of Warner Robins in Houston County is served by the Houston County School System (as are all other parts of Houston County). The portion of the city in Peach County is served by Peach County School District (as are all other parts of Peach County).

=== Branch campuses of colleges and universities ===
- Central Georgia Technical College
- Fort Valley State University
- Georgia College & State University
- Georgia Military College
- Mercer University
- Middle Georgia State University

=== High schools ===
- Houston County High School
- Houston College & Career Academy
- Northside High School
- Warner Robins High School
- Veterans High School (in nearby unincorporated Kathleen, Georgia)
- Elberta Center
- Houston County WIN Academy (alternative school)

=== Libraries ===
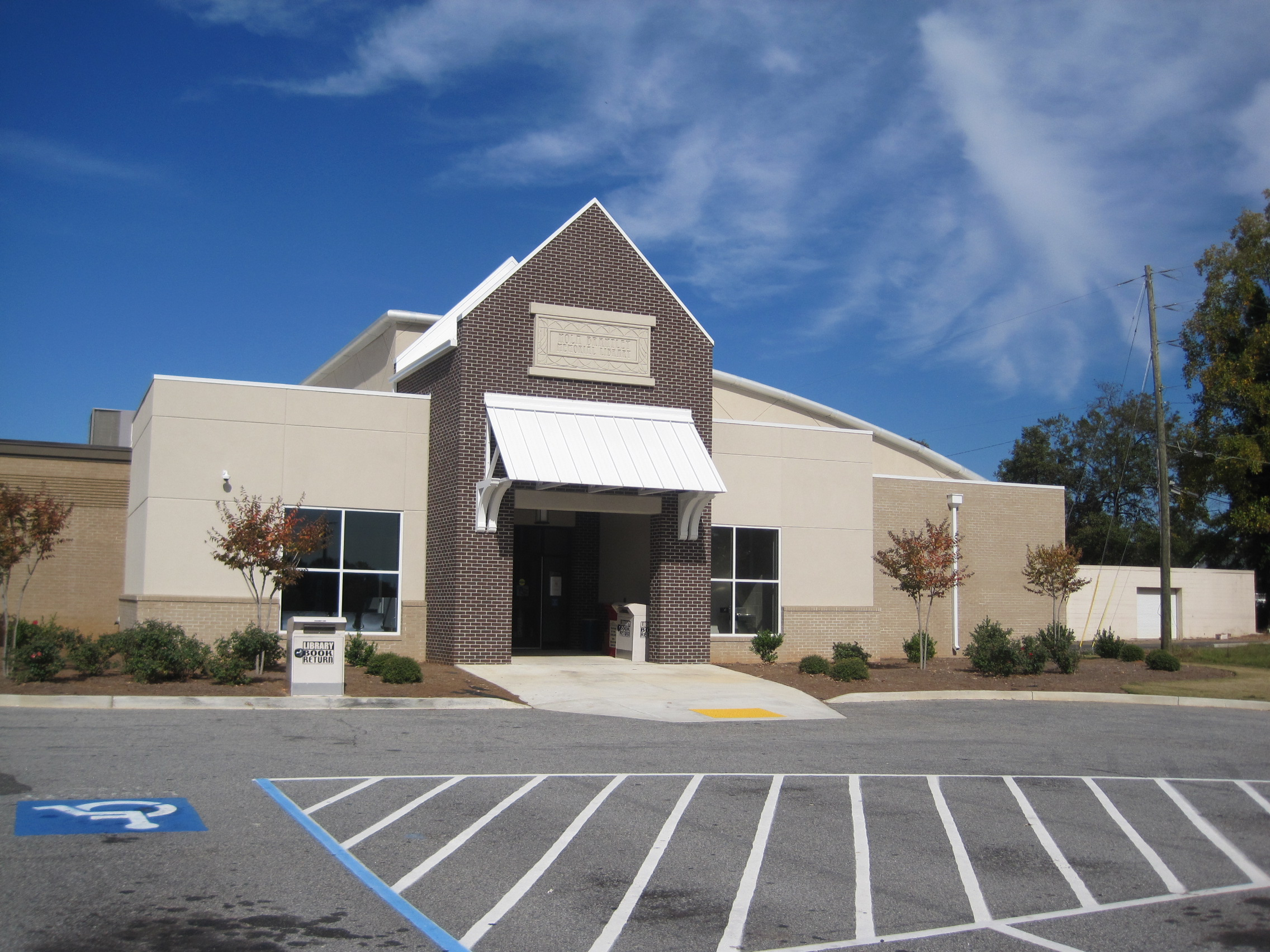
Nola Brantley Memorial Library

The library is the Nola Brantley Memorial Library.

== Notable people ==
- Eddie Anderson — professional football player
- Russell Branyan — Major League Baseball player
- James Brooks — professional football player
- Cortez Broughton — professional football player
- Marquez Callaway — former Tennessee Volunteers and NFL football player, currently a free agent
- Betty Cantrell — Miss America 2016
- Kal Daniels — Major League Baseball (MLB) player
- Robert Davis — professional football player with the Washington Redskins
- Travis Denning — country music singer
- Bobbie Eakes — Emmy Award-nominated actress; singer
- Jake Fromm — former Georgia Bulldogs quarterback, current NFL free-agent quarterback
- Phil Horan — former drummer in the post-rock band Maserati
- Willis Hunt — senior federal judge for the U.S. Northern District of Georgia
- Jessie James — pop singer
- Mark Johnson — MLB player
- Abry Jones — professional football player
- Daniel-Leon Kit — entertainer, web personality
- Amanda Kozak — Miss Georgia 2006
- Kyle Moore — professional football player
- David Perdue — former U.S. Senator
- Sonny Perdue — Governor of Georgia, 2003–2011; United States Secretary of Agriculture, 2017–2021
- Victoria Principal — actress
- Willie Reid — professional football player
- Mike Richardson — professional football player
- Robert Lee Scott, Jr. — U.S. Air Force brigadier general and pilot, wrote autobiography God is My Co-Pilot
- Ken Shamrock — professional MMA fighter and professional wrestler
- Ron Simmons — professional football player and professional wrestler
- Ben Smith — Number 22 overall in the 1990 NFL draft by the Philadelphia Eagles, played defensive back for Philadelphia Eagles, Denver Broncos, and Arizona Cardinals
- Chansi Stuckey — professional football player
- Timothy Walker — former professional football player, Seattle Seahawks
- Robert Waymouth — chemistry professor at Stanford University
- Steven Nelson - professional football player
- Wylie Draper — actor, dancer, choreographer best known for playing Michael Jackson in The Jacksons: An American Dream
