= Kitt =

Kitt may refer to:

== People ==
- Kitt (surname)
- Kitt O'Brien (born 1990), American football player
- Kitt Wakeley, American composer, songwriter, musician and music producer

== Places ==
- Kitt Peak, a mountain in Arizona

== Radio stations ==
- KCHQ (FM), licensed to serve Soda Springs, Idaho, United States, which held the call sign KITT from 2004 to 2017

== Other uses ==
- KITT, two fictional automobiles in the Knight Rider franchise

== See also ==
- Kit (disambiguation)
- Kitts (disambiguation)
