= Daniel-Leon Kit =

American actor

- Born: Daniel Leon Kit Walker; June 14, 1998 (age 26); Warner Robins, Georgia, United States
- Other names: Daniel-Leon; Daniel-Leon Kit Armstrong Hackett-Walker
- Occupations: Entertainer/Performer; Writer; Songwriter
- Years active: 2002 - present
- Website: wix.com/4myentertainmenttv/danielleonkitofficial/

Daniel-Leon Kit (born June 14, 1998) is an American actor, singer, dancer, writer, and songwriter, best known as Vincent Ellis Ross, III in Stretch: the Movie, Walter Rat in the stage play of Thumbelina, and Santa Claus in the musical of Santa Dot Claus. He currently lives in Warner Robins, Georgia. Kit appeared in the 2012 family comedy Parental Guidance.

== Personal life ==
Daniel-Leon Kit was born in Warner Robins, Georgia. He was born to Rev. Jeffery Walker and his wife. He is of African American and Cherokee Indian descent. Kit was born Daniel Leon Kit Walker, but he grew tired of people calling him Daniel Leon Walker or Daniel Kit Walker, so hyphenated his first two names to ensure both middle names were used. He subsequently changed his name again to Daniel-Leon Kit.

== Career ==
Kit's first production was when he was five years old. He later started getting offers for bigger roles, but he still remained doing local talent shows. When Kit turned ten years-old, he was offered a minor role feature film movie to play Vincent Ellis Ross, III in the movie of Stretch, but filming for the movies has been delayed for several years due to most of the cast were high school students who were graduating.

Kit also writes music for himself and the hit group Kourtesy. He considers himself the co-manager of the group, and also has written at least ten songs for the upcoming album.

== Filmography ==
Year	Title	Role	Notes
2012	Parental Guidance	(uncredited)	Feature Film
2013	The Kandi Factory	featured audience member	TV show
2013	The Steve Harvey Show	himself	TV show; Pre-production
