= Kitt (surname) =

Kitt is a surname of English and German origins. Notable people with the surname include:

- A. J. Kitt (born 1968), American alpine ski racer
- Camille and Kennerly Kitt (born 1989), identical twin American actresses and harpists
- Captain Kitt (active c. 1820), Irish Whiteboys captain
- David Kitt (born 1975), Irish musician
- Eartha Kitt (1927–2008), American actress, singer, and cabaret star
- Michael F. Kitt (1914–1974), Irish Fianna Fáil politician and long-serving Teachta Dála
- Michael P. Kitt (born 1950), Irish Fianna Fáil party politician
- Sandra Kitt, African-American author of contemporary romance novels
- Theo Kitt (1912–?), German bobsledder
- Tom Kitt (politician) (born 1952), Irish Fianna Fáil politician and Teachta Dála
- Tom Kitt (musician) (born 1974), American composer and conductor

== See also ==
- Kitts (surname)
