= Kito =

Kito or Kitō may refer to:

== People ==
- Kitō (surname), a Japanese surname
- Kito (musician), Australian DJ
- Kito de Boer (born 1957), Dutch business consultant and former diplomat
- Kito de Pavant (born 1961), French sailor
- Kito Junqueira (1948–2019), Brazilian actor and politician
- Kito Lorenc (1938–2017), German writer, poet and translator
- Kito Pikaahu, or Te Kitohi Pikaahu (born 1965), New Zealand Māori Anglican bishop
- Kito Poblah (born 1987), Canadian football player

== Places ==
- Kito, Tokushima, a former village in Naka District, Tokushima Prefecture, Japan
- Kito (Tonga), an island of Tonga

== Other uses ==
- Kito (slang), a Nigerian term for financial extortion targeted at gay men
- KITO-FM, a radio station in Vinita, Oklahoma, United States
- Kitō-ryū, a Japanese martial art
