= Kitts (surname) =

Kitts is an English surname. It is also an anglicized version of the German surname Götz. Notable people with the surname include:

- Chloe Kitts (born 2004), American basketball player
- Derrick Kitts (born c. 1973), Republican politician from Hillsboro in the U.S. state of Oregon
- Frank Kitts (1912–1979), Mayor of Wellington, New Zealand
- Isaac Kitts (1896–1953), American horse rider
- James Kitts (1900–1952), American football, basketball, and baseball player and coach
- Jim Kitts (born 1972), former American football running back
- Miles Brown Kitts (1880–1947), Republican mayor of Erie, Pennsylvania
- Wesley Kitts (born 1990), American weightlifter, Olympian
- Willard A. Kitts (1894–1964) United States Navy admiral

== See also ==
- Kitt (surname)
- Götz
