= Year of the Griffin =

2000 fantasy novel by Diana Wynne Jones

- Front cover of the US first edition
- Author: Diana Wynne Jones
- Cover artist: John Sullivan (UK) (Note: The infobox provides data from ISFDB for UK and US editions in that order (both published October 2010). The first OCLC number is missing (UK). • First UK edition at ISFDB. • First US edition at ISFDB.); Joseph A. Smith (depicted)
- Language: English
- Series: Derkholm
- Genre: Fantasy novel, parody
- Published: 2000 (Gollancz/UK, William Morrow/US)
- Publication place: United Kingdom; United States
- Media type: Print (hardcover)
- Pages: 218 (UK); 267 (US)
- ISBN: 978-0-575-07046-2
- OCLC: 42726020
- LC Class: PZ7.J684 Yc 2000
- Preceded by: Dark Lord of Derkholm

Year of the Griffin, later The Year of the Griffin in the UK, is a fantasy novel by the British author Diana Wynne Jones, published in 2000 simultaneously in the UK and the US. It is the sequel to The Dark Lord of Derkholm, set primarily at the university several years after that novel's radical conclusion.

Year is centred on six first-year students of magic, in relation to the administration and teachers, their families and studies, and each other. A review in Publishers Weekly called it a "boisterous spoof of the campus novel"; another in Booklist said that it continues "Jones' spoof of traditional fantasy conventions".

== Plot background ==
The Year is set in a fantasy world several years after the end of its domination by commercial tourism from the real world. The university formerly produced large numbers of competent wizards who served as tour guides; current staff aims to produce competent wizards who gradually repair the damage caused by tours. It suffers financially because tuition demand is down, which greatly concerns the faculty, and educationally from its long practical focus, which barely concerns the few who have noticed. The head, wizard Corkoran, is obsessed with becoming the first man to visit the moon and devotes much time to that, but there is little research or innovation generally. The senior wizards have all retired; the middle-age and young know of no other way.

Wizard Corkoran has selected children from wealthy families to fill his own first-year tutorial, hoping that a current appeal for donations will be fruitful. His class turns out to be unusual in other respects too. All six are talented, some in ways they do not yet understand, some encumbered by jinxes. Not one of the families is likely to donate because they have status rather than money, or their fortunes have recently slumped, or their children are here with grudging permission or none. Prince Lukin's father has not permitted him to be at the university, and his kingdom is also very poor; Ruskin is an escaped artisan dwarf, which is the third lowest and here to receive an education so the unjust ranking system can be overthrown; Felim ben Felim is a member of the royal family of Ampersand, whose Emir has vowed to send assassins if he is to attend; and Claudia, the half-sister of Emperor Titus, is here partially hiding from the Senate, who despise her for being half Marsh. Evidently, only one is personally wealthy, the beautiful Olga who does not divulge her name or even her region. Elda is the youngest daughter of Derk, the final Dark Lord before the revolution and head of a most important family now. She is a griffin, appearing at first glance to be frightening and inscrutable, and her father does not approve of university education.

The classmates quickly become fast friends, and two soon fall in love. They form common opinions of their teachers and courses, and undertake together some undirected extracurricular study. They all run afoul of Wizard Wermacht, a domineering man who teaches multiple subjects in a routine fashion. When Derk visits Elda, he has half a mind to take her home, but actually gives them a reading list strong in magical theory, especially the work of university founder Policant. Educationally it is a success although it does not help their grades.

Every other visit from home is a crisis for the classmates and often for the entire university. From the east a royal family sends seven assassins. Two Imperial Senators and a cluster of ruling class dwarves bring political and economic pressures. Olga's father proves to be the pirate of the Inland Sea. Two royalties arrive leading armies. Prince Lukin trades Ruskin to be his "servant" for the Book of Truth, which Olga had stolen from her father when she fled from an arranged marriage, and from which lies disappear. The Senators are arrested by Emperor Titus.

Eventually, the three more powerful and mature of Elda's six siblings get involved, human brother Blade and griffins Kit and Callette. Chancellor Querida also returns, the former University head who plotted successfully against the tourist industry. Jointly with a few others they secure the university and set it on the right track.

== Characters ==
Classmates

Six new students take Corkoran's tutorial and other first-year courses together. No other students are important.

- Elda is a griffin and the youngest daughter of human wizard Derk. She is much bigger than other university residents although not yet grown up.
- Felim is a brother of the Emir who rules far to the east. By purpose he is a scholar or inventor, not a member of the ruling family. His is the longest running family crisis of the year and to protect him magically from professional assassins the classmates undertake their most important program of self-study.
- Ruskin is an adult male dwarf from a fastness in the Central Peaks. He is a runaway slave from the ruling perspective but the chosen representative of his own low caste and others, for magical training at the university, eventually to help overthrow the system.
- Olga is a human woman, exceptionally beautiful, intelligent, and rich but keeps her background secret. After years working on board her father's ship, she happily arises at five and she is a find for the school rowing team. She can talk to elementals.
- Lukin is the Crown Prince of Luteria, a poor kingdom whose father King Luther forbade him to go study. As a magic-user he suffers from a jinx where he inadvertently opens huge pits magically by accident.
- Claudia is a teenage girl, the younger sister Titus, a young Emperor of the South. She suffers from another jinx and is half-Marsh.

Staff at the university:

- Wizard Corkoran is a tutor and the head of the university. He likes to wear colourful ties, and his aim is to be the first man on the moon. He spends most of his time working on his moon studies, to the point of neglecting the actual University. He is also very bad with money.
- Wizard Wermacht is the teacher at the university who takes most of the first-year classes, and also the youngest. He is nasty, strict, and dislikes Elda, Lukin and the others. He particularly dislikes Lukin, after he made the bad mistake on the first day of opening a seemingly bottomless pit in the floor of Wermacht's classroom. The word Wehrmacht, whence apparently derives his name, is the German title for Nazi Germany's unified armed forces. This derivation fits the character of a man who adheres to an inflexible and narrow-minded program of teaching and treats with overbearing nastiness those who seem weak or stand out for their differences. Before learning the divinely-selected but unassuming Wizard Derk's identity, Wermacht insults him and then ejects him from the courtyard. Those suffering from imperfections in the form of jinxes like Claudia and Lukin, meet his ire. Ruskin's identity as a dwarf draws Wermacht's wrath from the first day of class and he refers to Elda as "a monster".

Outside the university:

- Wizard Derk is a wizard specialising in genetics, especially the creation of new animals. He is a father of Shona and Blade (human), Kit, Callette, Lydda and Elda (griffin) and Angelo and Florence (winged humans). He has also created winged horses and intelligent carrier pigeons, among other things.
- Querida is one of the most powerful wizards in the world and a High Chancellor of the university, but she leaves the day-to-day running of things to Corkoran, a mistake which she later regrets.
- King Luther is a king of Luteria. He is not a particularly pleasant person, and treats his sons and daughters as if they were little children, even though they are practically adults already. He forbade Lukin to go to the university.
- Emperor Titus is the emperor of the South, and Claudia's half-brother. He is the only person who really liked Claudia when she was small and was kind to her. He has been at war with King Luther for a very long time.
- Flurian Atreck is a griffin from the other continent known as Flury. He is one of the four most powerful wizards in the world, and takes over teaching most of Wermacht's classes when Wermacht, for many long and complicated reasons (but deservingly), gets turned into a bar stool.
