= KIT =

KIT may refer to:

== Educational institutes ==
- Kanazawa Institute of Technology, Japan
- Kanpur Institute of Technology, Uttar Pradesh, India
- Karlsruhe Institute of Technology, Germany
- Koninklijk Instituut voor de Tropen or Royal Tropical Institute, Dutch institute for intercultural knowledge
- Kyoto Institute of Technology, Japan
- Kumoh National Institute of Technology, South Korea

== US radio stations ==
- KIT (AM), serving Yakima, Washington
- KMGW (FM), serving Naches, Washington, KIT-FM 2012-2015
- KATS, serving Yakima, Washington, KIT-FM 1968-1979

== Other uses ==
- Kernel for Intelligent Communication Terminals, for the German Bildschirmtext videotex system
- Kingston Interactive Television
- KIT (gene), encoding tyrosine-protein kinase KIT
- KIT, the National Rail code for Kintbury railway station in the county of Berkshire, UK
- Kunst im Tunnel, contemporary art museum, Düsseldorf, Germany

== See also ==
- KITS, FM radio station
- KITT, TV Knight Rider characters
- Kit (disambiguation)
