= Kit Mountain =

Mountain in Texas, United States

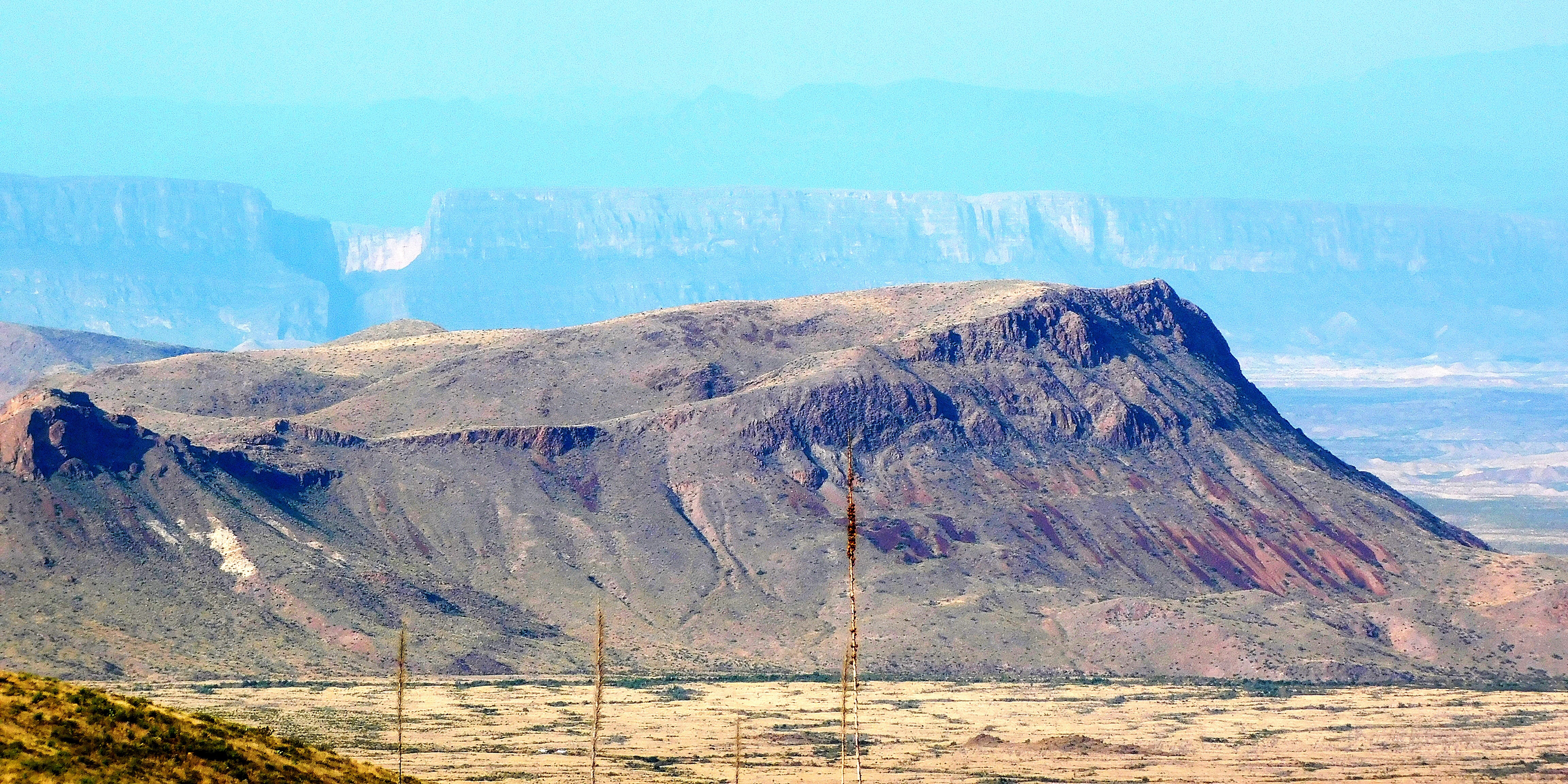
- East-northeast aspect

Highest point
- Elevation: 3,822 ft (1,165 m)
- Prominence: 746 ft (227 m)
- Isolation: 2.49 mi (4.01 km)
- Coordinates: 29°12′13″N 103°27′02″W

Naming
- Etymology: Kit fox

Geography
- Location within Texas Location within the United States
- Country: United States
- State: Texas
- County: Brewster
- Protected area: Big Bend National Park
- Parent range: Chisos Mountains
- Topo map: USGS Cerro Castellan

Geology
- Rock age: Oligocene
- Rock type: Igneous rock (tuff)

Kit Mountain is a 3,822-foot-elevation (1,165-meter) summit in Brewster County, Texas, United States.

== Description ==
Kit Mountain is part of the Chisos Mountains where it is set in the Chihuahuan Desert and Big Bend National Park. The mountain is composed chiefly of Burro Mesa Formation tuff (volcanic rock) overlaying Chisos Formation which formed 29 million years ago during the Oligocene period. Based on the Köppen climate classification, the mountain is located in a hot arid climate zone with hot summers and mild winters. This climate supports plants on the slopes such as live oak, juniper, piñon pine, and grasses. Any scant precipitation runoff from the peak's slopes drains to the Rio Grande which is seven miles to the southwest. Topographic relief is significant as the summit rises 900 feet (274 m) above the surrounding terrain in one-half mile (0.8 km). The mountain's toponym has been officially adopted by the United States Board on Geographic Names, and has been listed in publications since at least 1912. The kit fox is a rarely seen nocturnal desert mammal in Big Bend National Park.

== See also ==
- List of mountain peaks of Texas
- Geography of Texas
