= Sri Sivan Temple =

Hindu temple in Singapore

- ஸ்ரீ சிவன் கோவில்
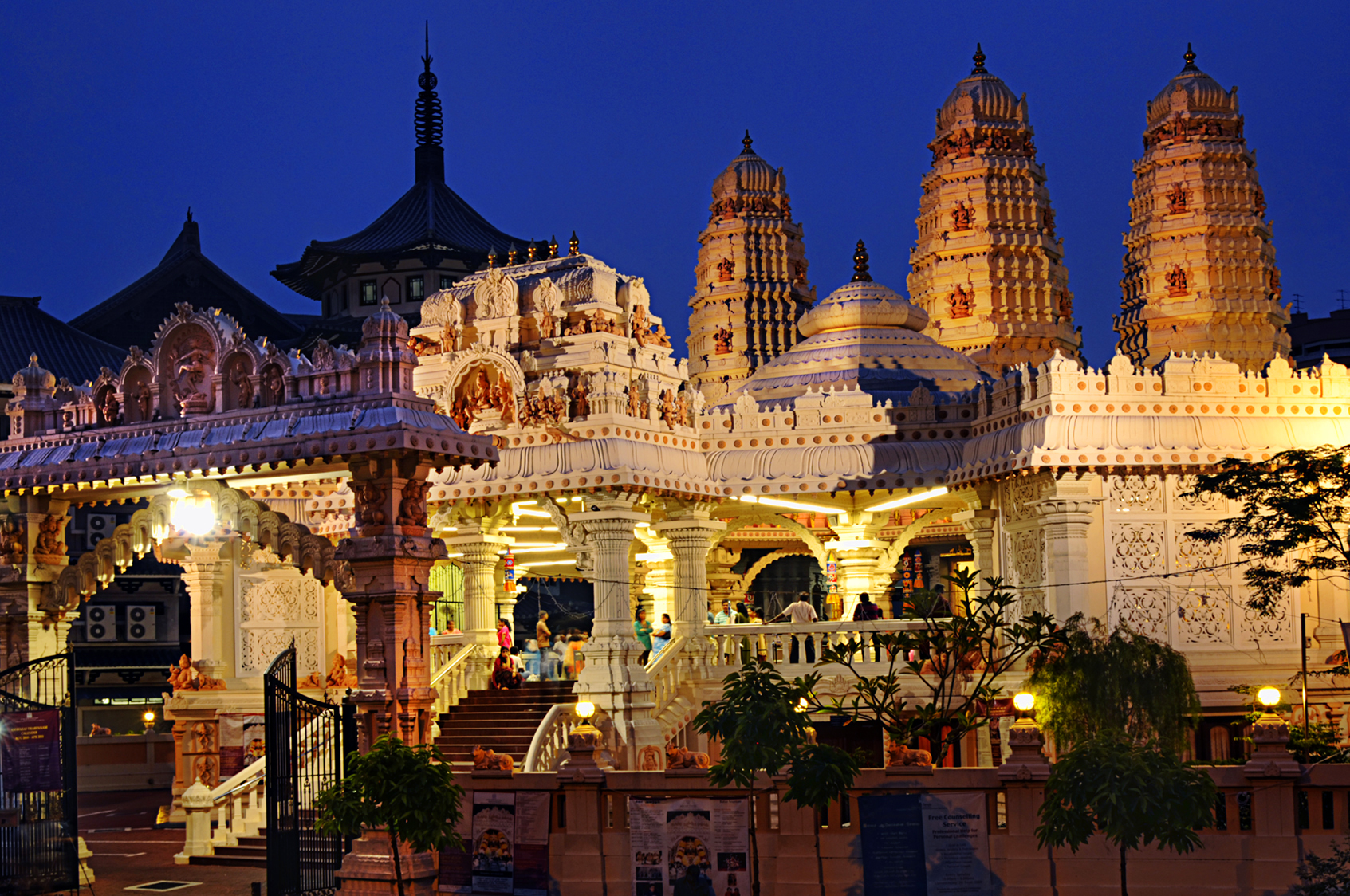
- Sri Sivan Temple in February 2011

- Location within Singapore

Religion
- Affiliation: Hinduism
- Deity: Shiva as Viswanathar, Parvati as Visalatchi
- Festivals: Maha Shivaratri, Vasantha Navratri, Guru Peryarchi, Navratri, Skantha Shasti

Location
- Location: 24 Geylang East Avenue 2, Singapore 389752
- Country: Singapore
- Coordinates: 1°19′6.68″N 103°53′18.31″E

Architecture
- Type: North Indian and Dravidian architecture fusion
- Completed: 1850; 176 years ago

Website
- sst.org.sg

Sri Sivan Temple (Tamil: ஸ்ரீ சிவன் கோவில்) is a Hindu temple built by the Tamil communities in Singapore for the god Shiva. The temple was originally located in Potong Pasir from where it was moved three more times before finally coming to the present location, adjacent to Foo Hai Ch'an Buddhist Monastery, in front of Paya Lebar MRT station exit C at Geylang East Avenue 2.

The presiding deity is Lord Shiva, as Viswanathar and his consort Parvati as Visalatchi. The temple also hosts a Natarajar statue, the dancer manifestation of Shiva as in Thillai Nataraja Temple, Chidambaram, with his consort Sivagamasundari along with Manikkavasagar, an ancient Tamil Shaiva poet who authored the great Thiruvasagam.

The temple's architecture is a distinctive fusion of the North Indian and South Indian architecture. The exterior, temple towers and colour palette draw from the North Indian temple architecture. However, the interiors, temple traditions and rituals closely follow the Tamil Shaivite practises. A dome structure in the main hall of the temple has statues lining its circumference, honouring the 63 Tamil Shaivite Nayanmars, who collectively composed and were revered in the Tamil Shaiva work, Tirumurai.

== History ==
=== Former sites af Shiva Lingam at Potong Pasir, MacDonald House and Dhoby Ghaut (before 1850s) ===
The Sivalinga was originally present in Potong Pasir, which was then moved to a spot in the lower end of Dhoby Ghaut, then to a site near where MacDonald House stands today, and then on to the Orchard Road site where it used to be until 1983.

=== Former temple site at Dhoby Ghaut (1850-1983) ===
Sivalinga which was earlier worshiped at Potong Pasir then moved to MacDonald House and finally to Dhoby Ghaut Green. At Dhoby Ghaut Green, an in-situ temple was built where the lingam was worshiped. This temple stayed there till 1983.

In 1898, a further phase of the recorded development of the Sri Sivan Temple began. The reconstruction work took several years to complete. One Mr V Nagappa Chetty and his wife were responsible for this, largely with their own funds and from donations collected from local Hindus.

==== WWII damage (1942) ====
During the Second World War, some of the statues of secondary deities and a part of the temple structure were damaged by shells that landed around it. Towards the end of the war, renovations were made to the temple and a consecration ceremony was held in July 1943. In 1954, the Municipal Commissioners wanted the temple to be setback 14 feet (4.3 m) from the road to widen Orchard Road. After long drawn discussions, a compromise was reached between the Board and the City Council. In consideration of the temple giving up 490 square feet (46 m^{2}) of the front land, the temple was given $50,000 and allowed to be rebuilt at the same site. Plans to rebuild the temple were drawn up in 1957. Local contractors completed the construction works in April 1962 and skilled craftsmen from India carried out the sculptural and ornamental works. The consecration ceremony was held on 9 December 1964.

=== Former temple site at Serangoon (1983-1993) ===
In 1983, the Government decided to acquire the land on which the temple stood. An MRT station was to be built underground. Therefore, a transit temple was built next to the Sri Srinivasa Perumal Temple at Serangoon Road while a more suitable and permanent site was being identified. The temple was demolished and all its deities where temporarily shifted to a new site at Serangoon Road. All the god-forms from the Orchard Road Temple were installed in the new site at Serangoon Road which allowed for all daily prayers and festivals celebrated to be continued Temple remained at this temporary site for 10 years til 1993.

=== Present site at Geylang (since 1993) ===
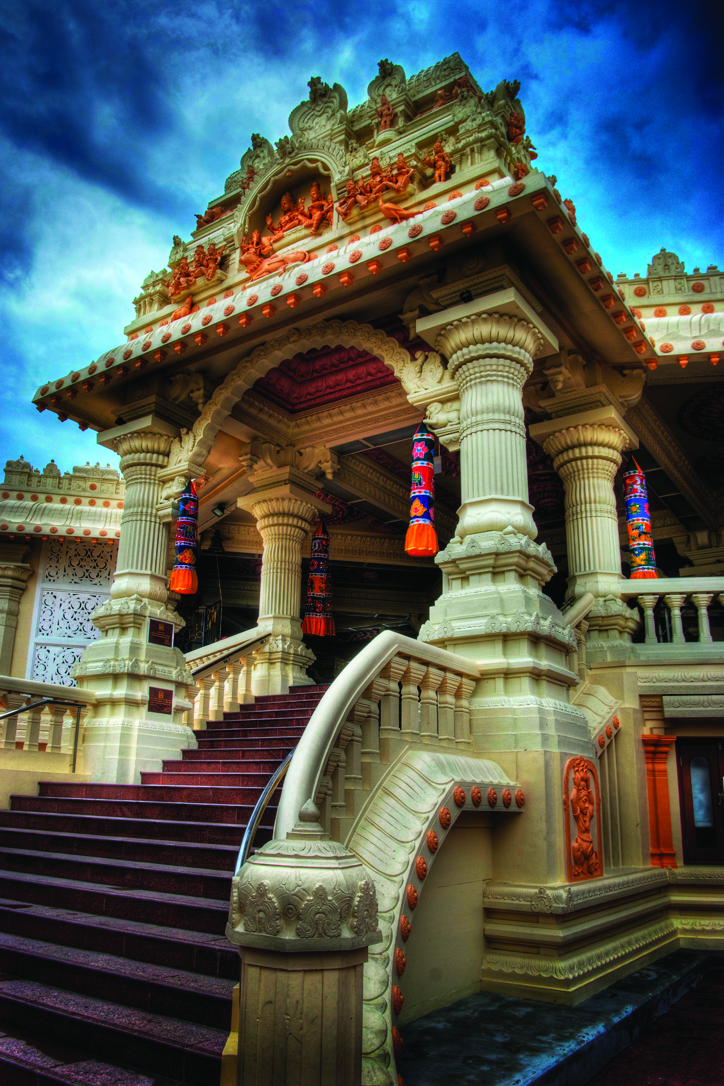
Sri Sivan Temple in Geylang

On 30 May 1993, the temple relocated from Serangoon Road and opened at its present site in Geylang. The Hindu Endowments Board had intended to make the new temple unique in appearance, features and facilities. The Board and the management committee of the temple consulted well-known temple architects in India. The Board sent a team to study the best of both the North and South Indian Temples. What followed was a unique design with an octagonal structure with a multi-purpose hall and staff quarters. The new temple was built at a cost of $6 million on a 3,000 sq. meter plot at Geylang East. The new site is about four-and-a-half times bigger than the temple's former site at Orchard Road.

After ten years of temporary residence at Serangoon Road, the Sri Sivan Temple was consecrated at its present Geylang East site on 30 May 1993. Its 2nd consecration ceremony was held on 27 January 2008, and its 3rd consecration ceremony was held on 8 June 2025.

=== Management Committee ===
An order placing Sri Sivan Temple under the Mohammedan and Hindu Endowments Board (set up in 1907) was gazetted on 18 October 1915. In 1968, the Hindu Endowments Board (HEB) was formed to manage four temples including the Sri Sivan Temple. The Hindu Endowments Board (HEB) under the purview of the Ministry of Community Development, Youth and Sports (MCYS) manages Sri Sivan Temple.

== Social activities ==
Several major festivals are celebrated at Sri Sivan Temple.

- Daily Pooja at 6 am, 8 am, 12 noon, 6 pm, 7 pm and 9 pm
- Maha Shivaratri
- Vasantha Navratri
- Guru Peyarchi
- Navratri
- Skantha Shasti
- Prathosam - twice a month, free feast with prayers starting at 4 pm and food at 6 pm.

== See also ==
- Context
  - 1915 Singapore Mutiny
  - Greater India
  - History of Indian influence on Southeast Asia
  - History of Singaporean Indians
  - Indian diaspora
  - Indianisation
  - Indian National Army in Singapore
  - Hinduism in South East Asia
- Indian-origin religions and people in Singapore
  - Arya Samaj in Singapore
  - Hinduism in Singapore
  - Jainism in Singapore
  - Indian Singaporeans
  - List of Hindu temples in Singapore
  - Lists of Hindu temples by country
  - List of Indian organisations in Singapore
  - Singaporean Indians
