= List of Indian organisations in Singapore =

Among the population of Indians in Singapore there are many organisations and societies of a religious, cultural, social, educational, professional, business and sporting nature.

== Religious organisations ==
=== Indian-origin religions ===
==== Government bodies ====
- Hindu Advisory Board
- Hindu Endowments Board
- Sikh Advisory Board

==== Unity organisations ====
- Global Association of Dharma-Dhamma Organisations, Singapore chapter
- Dharma Dhamma Conference, Singapore delegation

==== Place of worship ====
===== Buddhist temples =====
- Palelai Buddhist Temple
- Sakya Muni Buddha Gaya Temple
- Sri Lankaramaya Buddhist Temple
- Wat Ananda Metyarama Thai Buddhist Temple

===== Hindu temples =====
- Darma Muneeswaran Temple
- Sree Guru Raghavendra Seva Samajam
- Shree Lakshmi Narayan Temple
- Sree Maha Mariamman Temple
- Sree Ramar Temple
- Sri Arasakesari Sivan Temple
- Sri Arulmigu Murugan Temple
- Sri Holy Tree Bala Subramaniam Temple
- Sri Krishna Bhagawan Temple
- Sri Layan Sithi Vinayagar Temple
- Sri Manmatha Karuneshvarar Temple
- Sri Mariamman Muneeswarar Temple
- Sri Mariamman Temple
- Sri Muneeswaran Temple
- Sri Murugan Hill Temple
- Sri Ruthra Kaliamman Temple
- Sri Senpaga Vinayagar Temple
- Sri Siva-Krishna Temple
- Sri Sivan Temple
- Sri Srinivasa Perumal Temple
- Sri Thendayuthapani Temple
- Sri Vadapathira Kaliamman Temple
- Sri Vairavimada Kaliamman Temple
- Sri Veeramakaliamman Temple
- Ramakrishna Mission Singapore
- Sri Muneeswarar Peetam

===== Jain gurudwaras =====
- Jainism in Singapore

===== Sikh gurudwaras =====
- Central Sikh Gurudwara Board
- Khalsa Dharmak Sabha
- Pardesi Khalsa Dharmak Diwan
- Silat Road Sikh Temple
- Sri Guru Nanak Sat Sang Sabha
- Sri Guru Singh Sabha
- Yishun Sikh Temple

==== Other religious groups ====
===== Buddhist religious groups =====
- Singapore Sinhala Buddhist Association
- Buddhist Indian Association of Singapore

===== Hindu religious groups =====
- Arya Samaj in Singapore
- Durga Devi Amma Society
- Geeta Ashram
- Hindu Tamil Devotees Society
- Krishna Our Guide
- Ksihnam Vandey Jaga Gurum
- Namadwaar
- Narayana Gurukula
- Prasanthi Sai Mission
- Rajayoga Power Transcendental Meditation Centre, Singapore
- Ramakrishna Sangeetha Sabba
- Saiva Siddhantha Sangam
- Science of Living
- Shiv Mandir
- Shri Parmhans Advait Mat Society
- Singapore Ayyappa Seva Sangham
- Singapore Dakshina Bharata Brahmana Sabha
- Sri Aurobindo Society
- Sri Gnanananda Seva Samajam, Singapore
- Sri Sathya Sai Baba Centre Of Singapore
- Sri Sathya Sai Baba Service Centre
- Sri Sathya Sai Mission
- Sri Sathya Sai Prema Nilayam
- Sri Sathya Sai Seva Centre
- Sri Sathya Sai Society Singapore
- Sri Satya Sai Baba Centre Katong
- Sri Satya Sai Centre Selegie
- The Hindu Centre
- The Singapore Hindu Sabai
- Velmurugan Temple Society

===== Jain religious group =====
- Singapore Jain Religious Society

===== Sikh religious group =====
- Sikh Sewaks Singapore

=== Abrahmic religions ===
==== Place of worship ====
===== Indian churches =====
- Ang Mo Kio Tamil Methodist Church
- Cornerstone Tamil Fellowship, Under Cornerstone Community Church
- Ebenezer Malayalam Fellowship Singapore, a Malayalam Pentecostal Church
- Jireh Bible Presbyterian Church
- Jesus Lives Church
- Jurong Tamil Methodist Church
- King of Glory Church, Norris Road
- King of Glory Church, Bukit Batok
- Mar Thoma Syrian Church
- My Saviour's Church
- Pasir Panjang Tamil Methodist Church
- Philadelphia House of Fellowship
- New Hope Family Church Tamil and Hindi church
- Seletar Tamil Methodist Church
- Sembawang Tamil Methodist Church
- Smyrna Assembly (Life Centre) (English, Tamil, Telugu and Malayalam church)]
- South Asian International Fellowship (English, Tamil, Telugu and Hindi church in Singapore)
- St. Thomas Orthodox Syrian Cathedral
- Tamil Methodist Church

===== Indian mosques =====
- Masjid Abdul Gafoor
- Masjid Al-Abrar
- Masjid Al-Falah
- Masjid Angullia
- Masjid Bencoolen
- Masjid Hajjah Fatimah
- Masjid Jamae
- Masjid Malabar
- Masjid Moulana Md Ali
- Masjid Radin Mas
- Masjid Sultan

==== Other religious organisations ====
===== Muslim religious groups =====
- Dakhni Urdu Association
- Federation of Indian Muslims
- Islamic Fellowship Association
- Indian Muslim Social Service Association (IMSSA)
- Kayalpatnam Welfare Association
- Kilakkarai Welfare Association
- Koothanallur Association of Singapore
- Malabar Muslim Jama-ath
- Muthupettai Association
- Nagapattinam Association Singapore
- Nagore Association
- Podakkudi Association
- Rifayee Thareeq Association of Singapore
- Singapore Kadayanallur Muslim League
- Singapore Tenkasi Muslim Welfare Society
- Singapore Thuckalay Muslim Association
- South Indian Jamiathul Ulama
- Tariqatu-l Arusiyyatu-l Qadiriyya Worldwide Association
- The Jameyathul Muslimin of B&C Mutlur
- Thiruvithancode Muslim Union
- Thopputhurai Muslim Association
- United Indian Muslim Association

== Arts and sports groups ==
=== Arts groups ===
- AGAM Theatre Lab
- Apsaras Arts Performing Arts Company
- Association of Singapore Tamil Writers
- Bhaskar's Arts Academy Ltd
- Damaru Singapore
- Indian Arts Centre
- Indian Cultural Society
- Kala Mandhir
- Medasvi School of Dance
- Naujawan Orchestra
- Nrityalaya Aesthetics Society
- Sikh Cultural and Literary Society
- Singapore Indian Artistes' Association
- Singapore Indian Fine Arts Society
- Sakthi Fine Arts Singapore
- Singapore Kairalee Kala Nilayam
- Singapore Kairalee Film Forum
- Society Of Kalai Pithers
- Soorya (Singapore)
- Sri Saktivilas Mission
- Tamil Language And Cultural Society
- The Naval Base Kerala Library
- Vaineeka Music

=== Sports and recreation clubs ===
- Balestier Khalsa FC
- Ceylon Sports Club
- India International Insurance Sports & Recreation Club
- Indian Bank Recreation Club
- Indian Overseas Bank Recreation Club
- Sikh Sports Club
- Silambam Art Association
- Singapore Indian Association
- Singapore Indian Football Club
- Singapore Khalsa Association FC

== Education and welfare groups ==
=== Co-operatives and welfare groups ===
- Annamalai University Alumni Association (Singapore Chapter)
- Gnananandam Mission Singapore Chapter Ltd
- Indian Community Welfare Centre
- IT Services Cooperative Ltd
- Jamal Mohamed College Alumni Association (Singapore Chapter)
- Navajeevan Centre
- Ramakrishna Mission
- SANA Hindu Aftercare
- SANA Sikh Aftercare
- Sikh Welfare Council
- Singapore Indian Development Association (SINDA)
- Singapore Haryanvi Kunba
- Singapore Indian Education Trust
- Singapore Sikh Education Foundation
- Singapore Tenkasi Muslim Welfare Society
- Sree Narayana Mission
- Thopputhurai Muslim Association (Singapore)

=== Schools and educational institutions ===
- Christ Church Kindergarten
- DAV Hindi School
- Hindi Society Singapore
- Hariprasad Childcare
- Khalsa Kindergarten
- Radha Soami Satsang Beas Singapore
- Saraswathy Education Centre
- Singapore Tamils IT Society
- Umar Pulavar Tamil Language Centre
- Urdu Development Society
- Vithya Kindergarten
- Bangla Language and Literary Society, Singapore

== Social and professional groups ==
=== Business and professional groups ===
- Chettiars Nattukkottai Chamber Of Commerce
- Indian Institutes of Technology Alumni Association
- Indian Institute of Management Ahmedabad Alumni Association
- Professional Network of Young Indians
- Serangoon Merchants Association
- Sikh Money Lenders and Businessmen Association
- Sindhi Merchants Association
- Singapore Indian Chamber of Commerce & Industry
- Singapore Sri Lanka Business Association
- Singapore Tamil Teachers' Union

=== Social and cultural community groups ===
- Bengali Association Of Singapore
- BiJhar (Singapore)
- Haryanvi Khap of Singapore
- Indian Hall of Fame Singapore
- Indian Heritage Centre
- Indian Muslim Social Service Association (Singapore)
- Kannada Sangha (Singapore)
- Koothanallur Family Club
- Little India Shopkeepers and Heritage Association (LISHA)
- Maharashtra Mandal
- Marwari Mitra Mandal
- National University of Singapore Tamil Language Society
- Nanyang Technological University Tamil Literary Society
- Odia Society of Singapore(OSS)
- Sembawang Tamils Association
- Singapore Tamil Community (STC online Group) https://www.SgTamilCommunity.online
- Singapore Bengali Society
- Singapore Ceylon Tamils Association
- Singapore Gujarati Society
- Singapore Indian Development Association
- Singapore Kerala Association
- Singapore Kairalee Kalanilayam
- Singapore Malayalee Hindu Samajam
- Singapore North Indian Hindu Association
- Singapore Indian League
- Singapore Tamil Youths' Club
- Singapore Tamilian Association
- Singai Tamil Sangam
- Singapore Tamizhar Eyakkam
- Singapore Yadavar Association
- Singapore Telugu Samajam
- Society of Indian Students (formerly: Society of Indian Scholars)
- Tamils Information Technology Society, Singapore) -https://www.STiTSociety.org
- Tamils Representative Council (TRC)
- Tamils Reform Association
- Telangana Cultural Society (Singapore) - www.tcs-singapore.org
- Thamizhvel Narppani Mandram
- Thiruvalluvar Tamil Valarchik Kazhakam
- Yarthavar Association
- Surya Keeridam Association
- Odia Society of Singapore: http://singodia.org
- Malwa Cultural Association: https://malwa.sg/index.html

== See also ==
- Context
  - 1915 Singapore Mutiny
  - Greater India
  - History of Indian influence on Southeast Asia
  - History of Singaporean Indians
  - Indian diaspora
  - Indianisation
  - Indian National Army in Singapore
  - Hinduism in South East Asia
- Indian-origin religions and people in Singapore
  - Arya Samaj in Singapore
  - Hinduism in Singapore
  - Jainism in Singapore
  - Indian Singaporeans
  - List of Hindu temples in Singapore
  - Lists of Hindu temples
  - Singaporean Indians
