= Hinduism in Singapore =

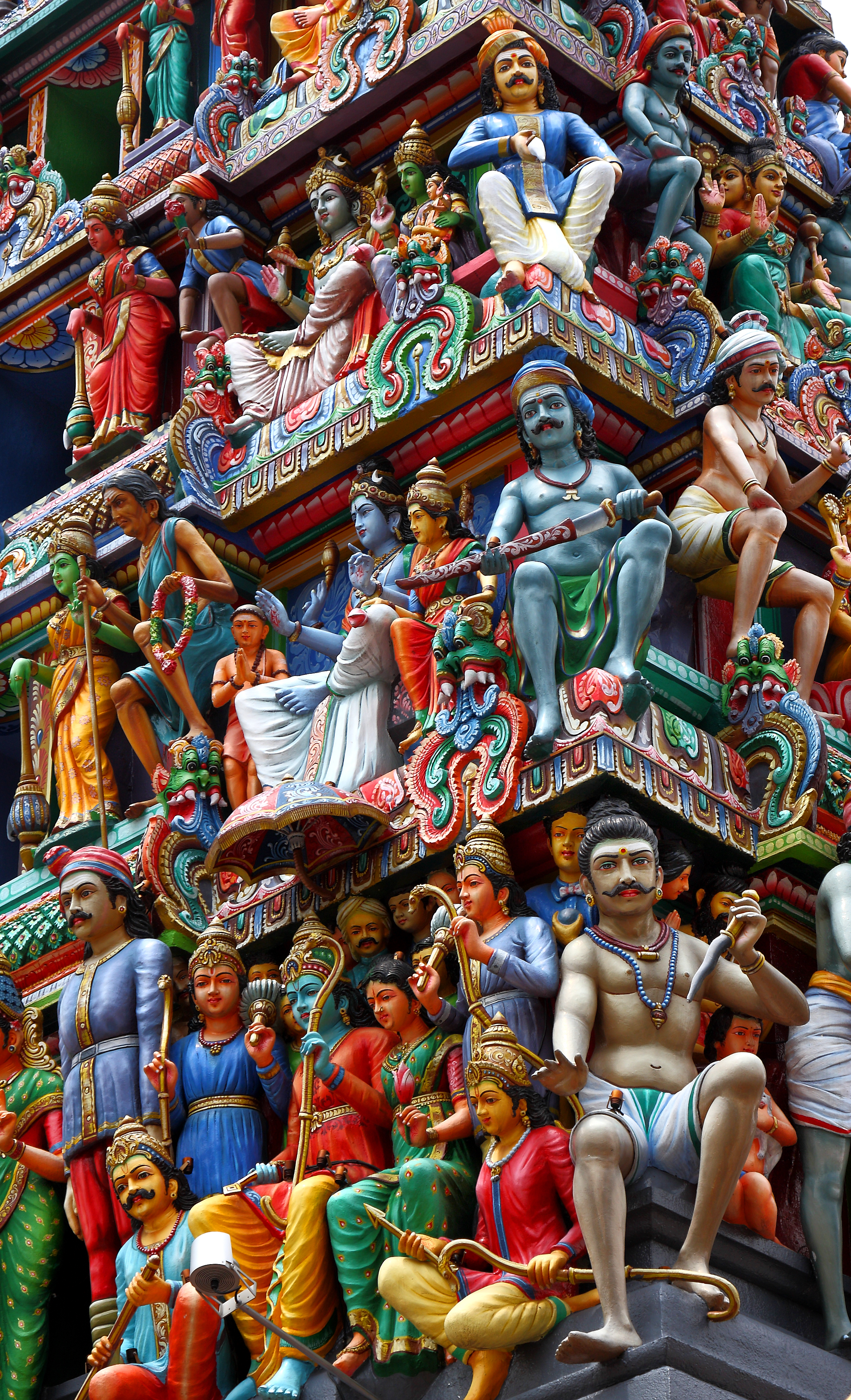
Depictions of Dravidian Hindu art on the gopuram (entrance tower) of Sri Mariamman Temple, Singapore, dedicated to the Hindu goddess of rain; Mariamman.

Hindu religion and culture in Singapore can be traced to the 7th century AD, when Temasek was a trading post of Hindu-Buddhist Srivijaya empire. A millennium later, a wave of immigrants from southern India were brought to Singapore, mostly as coolies and indentured labourers by the British East India Company and colonial British Empire. As with Malay peninsula, the British administration sought to stabilise a reliable labour force in its regional plantation and trading activities; it encouraged Hindus to bring family through the kangani system of migration, settle, build temples and segregated it into a community that later became Little India.

There are currently about thirty main Hindu temples in Singapore. There were an estimated 172,963 Hindus in Singapore according to the 2020 Census constituting 5.0% of the Singapore's resident (Note: In Singapore, the term "resident" refers to both citizens and permanent residents (PRs).) population. Almost all Hindus in Singapore are ethnic Indians (99%), with some who have married into Hindu families. Hinduism peaked at 5.5% of the total population in 1931.

In Singapore, the Hindu festival of Deepavali is recognised as a national public holiday. Some non-Indians, usually Buddhist Chinese, participate in various Hindu activities. Unlike various states of Malaysia and Indonesia, Singapore places no restrictions on religious freedoms of Hindus.

== Demographics ==
Year	Percent	Increase
1849	2.8%	-
1911	5.0%	+2.2%
1921	4.6%	−0.4%
1931	5.5%	+0.9%
1980	3.6%	−1.9%
1990	3.7%	+0.1%
2000	4.0%	+0.3%
2010	5.1%	+1.1%
2015	4.96%	−0.14%
2020	5.0%	+0.04%

Population of resident ethnic group registered as Hindus 2020. The proportion of Indians following Islam, Christianity and Buddhism are relatively higher as the Singaporean Census calculate Pakistanis, Bangladeshis, Sri Lankan etc under ethnic Indian Category.

Ethnic Group	Population of Resident Ethnic Group registered as Hindus	Percentage Resident Ethnic Group registered as Hindus	Percentage of Resident Population	Total Resident Population of Ethnic Group
Chinese	458	0.018%	75.36%	2,606,881
Malays	223	0.05%	12.94%	447,747
Indians	171,326	57.29%	8.65%	299,056
Others	956	0.91%	3.05%	105,410
Overall	172,963	5.00%	100%	3,459,093

Population of resident ethnic group registered as Hindus 2015.

Ethnic Group	Population of Resident Ethnic Group registered as Hindus	Percentage Resident Ethnic Group registered as Hindus	Percentage of Resident Population	Total Resident Population of Ethnic Group
Chinese	300	0.012%	76.84%	2,517,580
Malays	100	0.03%	11.88%	389,090
Indians	161,800	59.88%	8.25%	270,220
Others	400	0.403%	3.03%	99,300
Overall	162,600	4.964%	100%	3,276,190

== History ==
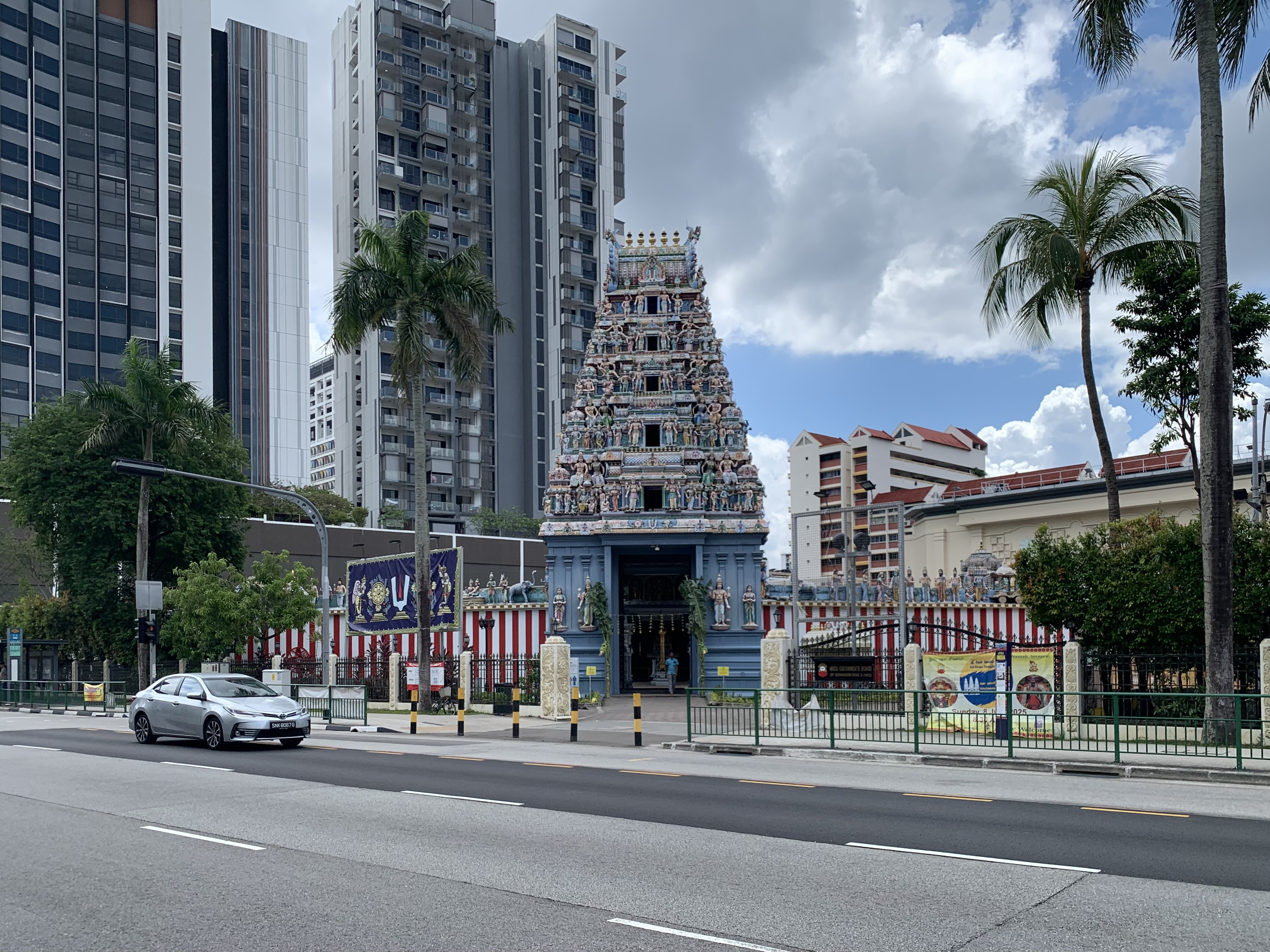
Sri Srinivasa Perumal Temple

Hindu religion and culture in Singapore can be traced back to the 7th century Hindu Srivijaya empire when Temasek was a small trading post. By the 10th century, Tamil Chola influence arrived. With Islam's expansion in the region from 14th through 17th century, the Hindu-Buddhist influence, in and around Singapore, faded. The colonial era brought major changes in the seats of power and religious influence in the region.

The early 19th century saw a wave of Hindu immigrants to Singapore from southern India, mostly Tamils, brought in to work as coolies and labourers by the British East India Company in Singapore. These immigrants brought along their religion and culture. Their arrival saw the building of temples throughout the island in the Dravidian form of architecture, and the beginnings of a vibrant Hindu culture.

Though the labourers were mostly responsible for introducing and preserving their religion in their new home, in later times, monetary contributions were made by the richer Hindu merchants to build up the makeshift shacks that served as their place of worship. The temples also served to hold the community together, being a source of comfort to those far away in a foreign land.

== Modern day ==
Two statutory government bodies deal with all Hindu affairs — The Hindu Endowments Board and the Hindu Advisory Board.

Hindus make up a minority, comprising about 5.1% (2010 Census) of adult Singapore citizens and permanent residents. Among 15 years or older population, there were about 158,000 Hindus according to Singapore's 2010 Census; 37% of all Hindus in Singapore speak Tamil at home, while another 42% speak English. Vast majority of Hindus in Singapore are ethnic South Indians. The small numbers of non-Indian Hindus are mainly Chinese and Malay women who were adopted by or married into Hindu families.

The leading organizations of traditional Hinduism in Singapore are the Singapore Hindu Sabha, the South Indian Brahmin Association, and the North Indian Hindu Association.

In Singapore a number of non-Indians, such as Buddhist Chinese, participate in a variety of Hindu activities, including praying to Hindu deities, donating money to the temple funds and participating in Hindu festivals like Deepavali, the fire-walking ceremony, and Thaipusam. Certain temples, such as the Sri Krishnan Temple in Waterloo Street, or some Hindu temples in Yishun have also built up substantial followers among the Chinese community, who often visit these temples on their way to or from visiting nearby Chinese temples.

There have been a few xenophobic and racist incidents against Indians and Hindus. In May 2021, a Hindu family of Indian origin living in Housing Development Board (HDB) had been conducting their daily prayers which they were doing for the past 20 years. A Chinese Singaporean neighbour allegedly responded by striking a loud gong to disrupt their prayers. The incident gained national attention marking anti-India and anti-Hindu sentiments in Singapore.

== Temples ==
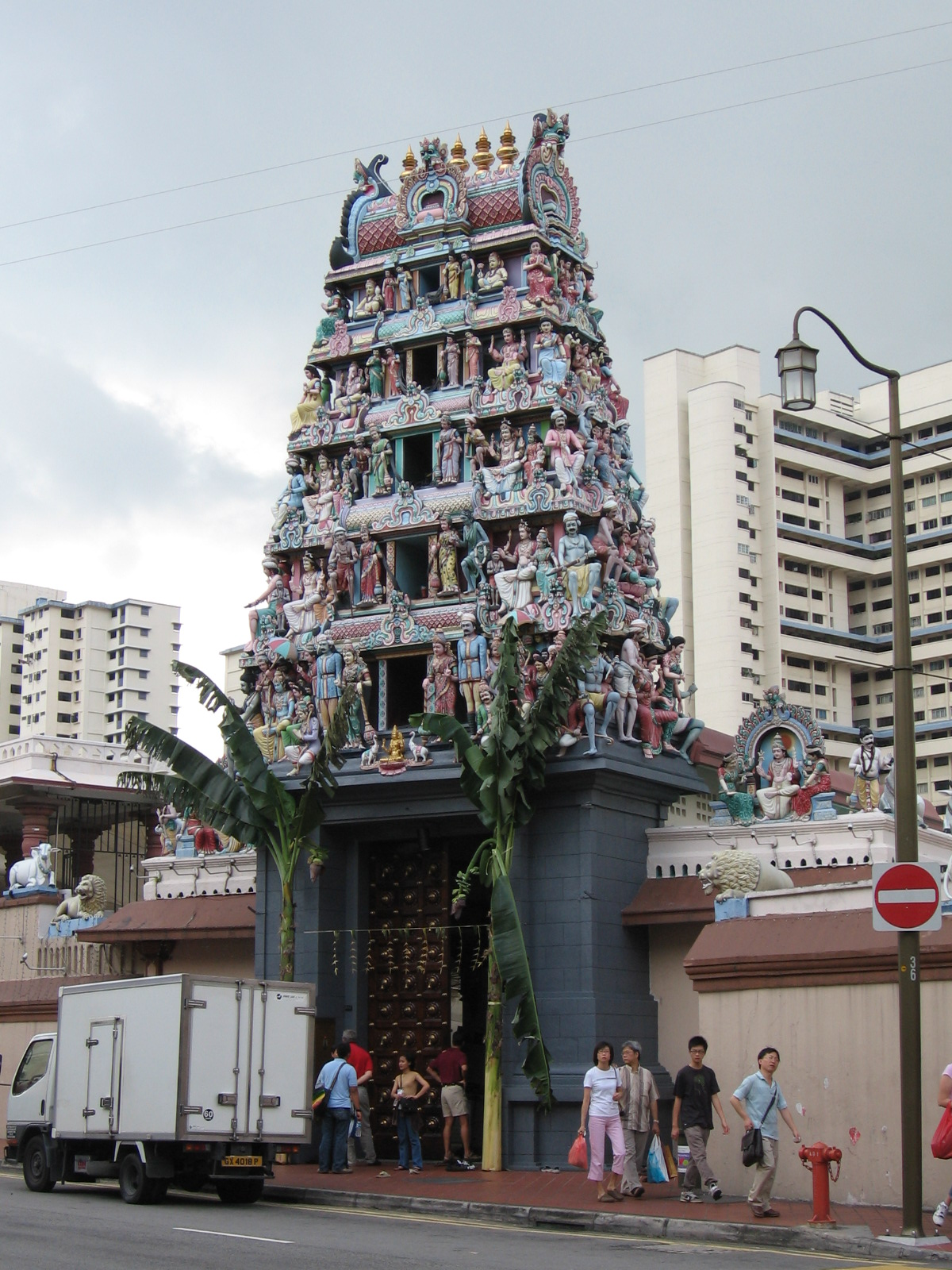
Sri Mariamman Temple

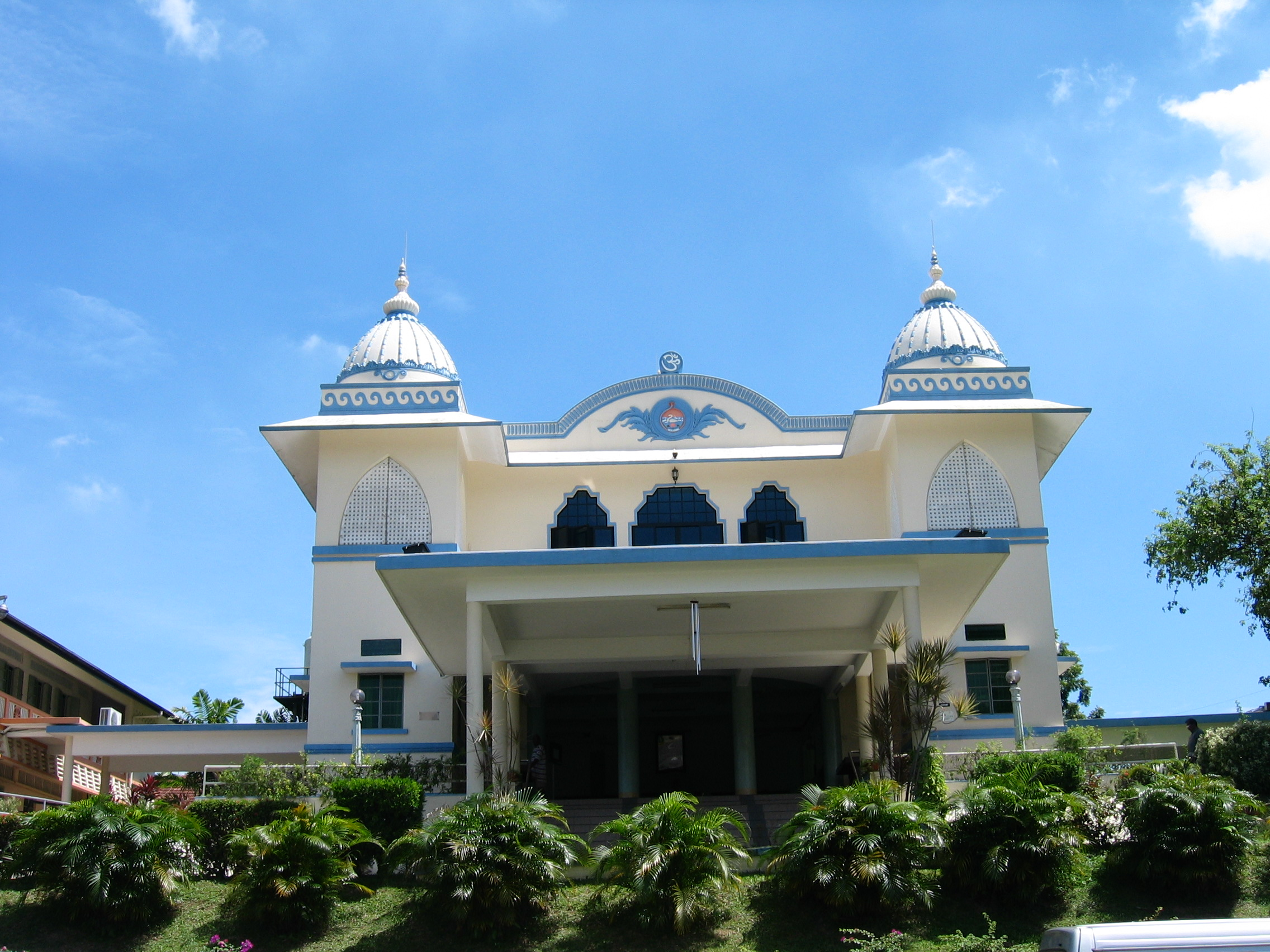
Ramakrishna Mission Prayer Hall

There are currently about thirty main temples in Singapore, dedicated to various gods and goddesses from the Hindu pantheon.

The Hindu temples of Singapore are built in the Dravidian style, mainly the Tamil style found in Tamil Nadu, India. This style is known for its imposing 'gopurams' or entrance towers, complex friezes, intricate carvings and paintings or murals done on the walls and ceilings. Since the majority of Hindus hail from South India, the temples are usually dedicated to the goddess Mariamman, Shiva, Murugan, Ganesha, and Durga. At the same time, there are also temples for those from North India, such as the Sri Veeramakaliamman Temple for Kali and the Sri Lakshminarayan Temple for Lakshmi and Vishnu. Different communities have also established their own temples in Singapore, such as the Sri Lankan Tamil community established the Sri Senpaga Vinayagar Temple at Ceylon Road and the Chettiar community set up the Sri Thandayuthapani Temple at Tank Road.

The first verifiable temple, Sri Mariamman Temple in Chinatown, was built as early as 1827 by Narayana Pillai, a clerk to Sir Stamford Raffles; it was dedicated to the Hindu goddess Mariamman, an incarnation of the Mother Goddess. He first erected a wooden, thatched hut on this site that he had purchased in 1823. The present temple was completed by 1863.

There are 3 Hindu temples which are gazetted as national monuments of Singapore. The Sri Mariamman Temple was the first Hindu temple to become a national monument in 1973, the Sri Srinivasa Perumal Temple in 1978 and the Sri Thendayuthapani Temple in 2014.

== Religious festivals ==
Some of the major Hindu festivals celebrated every year include Deepavali (Diwali), Thaipusam, Pongal, Tamil New Year or Varuda Pirappu, Holi also known as Festival of Colours and Thimithi or otherwise known as the Fire Walking Festival.

Deepavali is the only Hindu religious public holiday in Singapore. The Hindus have also urged the government to make Thaipusam, a former public holiday, to be reinstated as a public holiday as the Christian and Muslim religions have two public holiday each.

=== Holiday ===
Before the independence of Singapore in 1965, each religious group was having one to three religious public holidays with both Hindu festivals of Deepavali and Thaipusam as national public holidays.

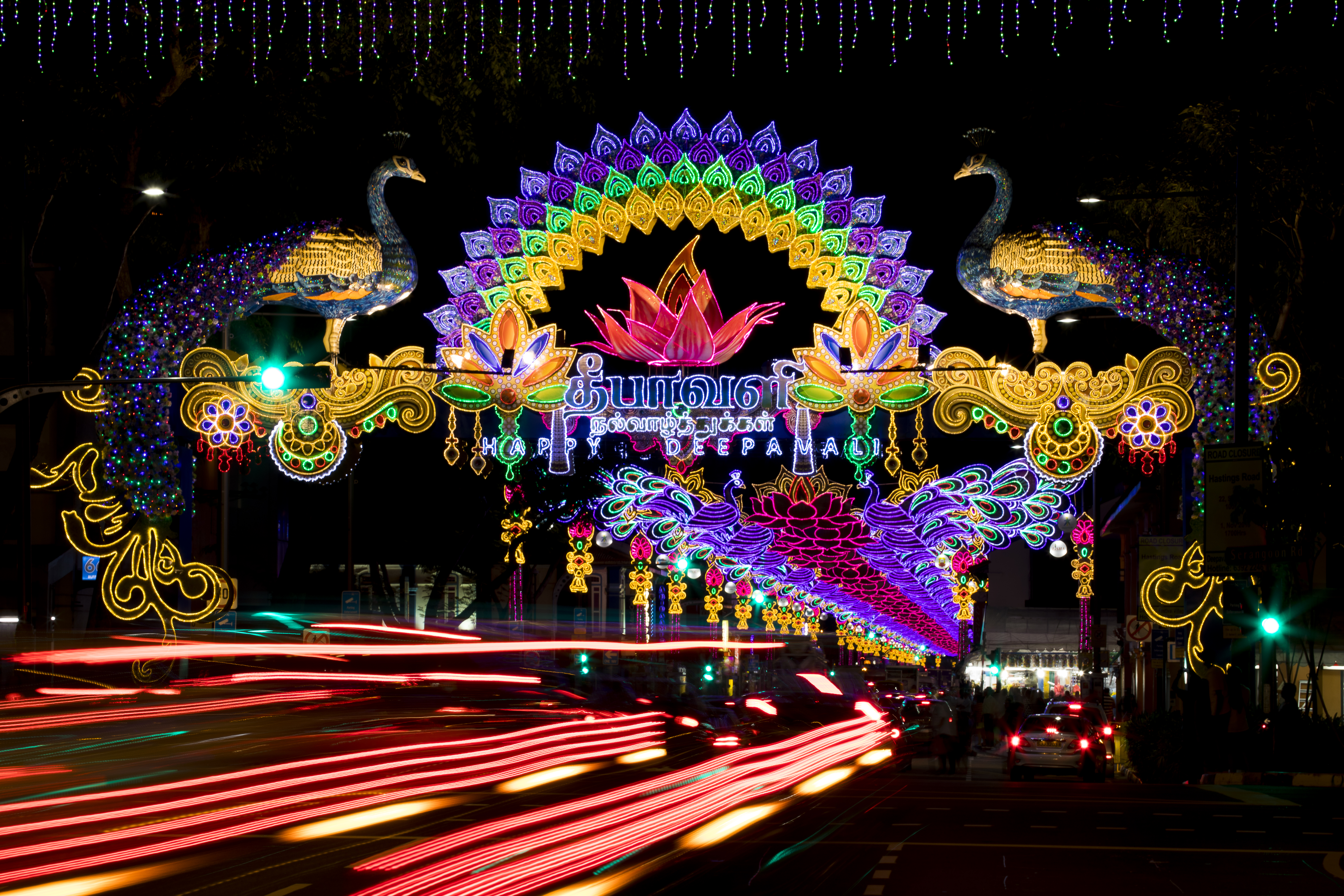
Deepavali decoration on Serangoon Road

After the independence of Singapore, each religious group were asked, with the exception of the Buddhist religious group as there was only one Buddhist religious public holiday, to choose a religious public holiday of their own to be removed to reduce the overall number of public holidays in Singapore for Singapore to be competitive in the global market. Thaipusam was chosen to be removed as a public holiday by the Hindus.

After the 1968 amendment of the 1966 Holidays Act, two public holidays were designated each for the Christian (Good Friday and Christmas) and Muslim (Eid al-Fitr and Eid al-Adha) religions while only one public holiday was designated to both the Hindu (Deepavali) and Buddhist (Vesak Day) religions.

Subsequently there were calls from the Hindus to reinstate Thaipusam as a public holiday. In 2015, a petition was launched by educator Sangeetha Thanapal which attracted nearly 20,000 signatures. A rally was also planned in Hong Lim Park but was cancelled by the police.

== See also ==
- Context
  - 1915 Singapore Mutiny
  - Greater India
  - History of Indian influence on Southeast Asia
  - History of Singaporean Indians
  - Non-resident Indian and Overseas Citizen of India
  - Indianisation
  - Indian National Army in Singapore
  - Hinduism in Southeast Asia
- Indian-origin religions and people in Singapore
  - Arya Samaj in Singapore
  - Jainism in Singapore
  - Indian Singaporeans
  - List of Hindu temples in Singapore
  - Lists of Hindu temples by country
  - List of Indian organisations in Singapore
