= Arya Samaj in Singapore =

Hindu religious, community and educational organisation in Singapore

Arya Samaj, Singapore
- Formation: 1927 (99 years ago); Singapore
- Founder: Dayananda Saraswati (founder of Arya Samaj movement)
- Type: Religious organisation
- Legal status: Foundation
- Headquarters: 113, Syed Alwi Road, Singapore
- Region served: Singapore
- Main organ: आर्य प्रतिनिधि सभा – sārvadēśika ārya pratinidhi sabhā
- Affiliations: आर्य प्रतिनिधि सभा – sārvadēśika ārya pratinidhi sabhā
- Website: www.aryasamajsingapore.org

Arya Samaj (Hindi: आर्य समाज, lit. 'Noble Society') is a Hindu reform movement founded on 10 April 1875 in Bombay by Dayananda Saraswati, based on the infallible authority of the Vedas, monotheistic worship, and social reforms opposing caste discrimination, child marriage, and idol worship. The Singapore chapter of Arya Samaj has existed since 1927 and offers Hindi classes at its premises through the Dayanand Anglo-Vedic Schools System.

== History ==
In 1927, Arya Samaj was established in Singapore in a shophouse in Rowell Road.

During the Second World War, the activities of the Arya Samaj were interrupted by the Japanese occupation of Singapore from 1942 to 1945.

In 1963, the current building of the Arya Samaj movement on Syed Alwi Road was opened by Mollamal Sachdev, whose family made a generous contribution to the building fund.

On 1–2 November 2014, Arya Samaj Singapore celebrated International Arya Conference (Hindi: अंतर्राष्ट्रीय आर्य महा सम्मलेन) to mark 101 years of the Arya Samaj movement.

In 2015, the inaugural International Yoga Day (Hindi: अंतर्राष्ट्रीय योग दिवस) was celebrated by the Arya Samaj.

== Arya Bhawan Singapore ==
The Arya Bhawan Singapore (Hindi: आर्य भवन सिंगापुर) building at Syed Alwi Road is used as a community hall for weddings and other traditional Hindu festivals such as Deepavali and Holi.

== DAV Hindi School, Singapore ==
DAV Hindi School, Singapore (Hindi: दयानन्द अंग्लोवेदिक हिंदी विधालय, सिंगापुर) is run by the Arya Samaj to teach Hindi language at its premises through the D.A.V. Hindi School. While English is the primary language of instruction in Singapore schools, the mother tongue is a compulsory subject at the Primary School Leaving Examination (PSLE), Singapore-Cambridge GCE Ordinary Level ('O' Level) and Singapore-Cambridge GCE Advanced Level ('A' Level). The DAV Hindi School in Singapore covers the syllabus for these exams.

== Singapore Arya Vedic Library ==
The Singapore Arya Vedic Library (Hindi: सिंगापुर आर्य वैदिक पुस्तकालय) is located at Arya Samaj Bhawan at Syed Alwi Road. It houses Vedic and Arya Samaj books.

== Membership ==
In 1975, the membership of the Arya Samaj in Singapore stood at approximately 350..

== See also ==
- Context
  - 1915 Singapore Mutiny
  - Greater India
  - History of Indian influence on Southeast Asia
  - History of Singaporean Indians
  - Indian diaspora
  - Indianisation
  - Indian National Army in Singapore
  - Hinduism in South East Asia
- Indian-origin religions and people in Singapore
  - Hinduism in Singapore
  - Hindu Endowments Board
  - Jainism in Singapore
  - Indian Singaporeans
  - List of Hindu temples in Singapore
  - Lists of Hindu temples by country
  - List of Indian organisations in Singapore
