= Hindu Endowments Board =

Statutory body

Agency overview
- Formed: 1 May 1968; 58 years ago
- Jurisdiction: Government of Singapore
- Headquarters: Sri Srinivasa Perumal Temple, 397 Serangoon Road, Singapore 218123
- Agency executives: R. Jayachandran, Chairman; Sarojini Padmanathan, Chief Executive Officer
- Parent agency: Ministry of Culture, Community and Youth
- Website: heb.org.sg
- Agency ID: T08GB0016C

The Hindu Endowments Board (HEB) is a statutory board under the Ministry of Culture, Community and Youth (MCCY) in Singapore.

== Role ==
=== Temple and Community Organization management ===
The Hindu Endowments Board (HEB) manages the Sri Mariamman Temple, Sri Srinivasa Perumal Temple, Sri Sivan Temple and Sri Vairavimada Kaliamman Temples, and also administers HEB-Ashram, a halfway house for the rehabilitation of substance abusers.

=== Celebration of Hindu Festivals ===
HEB’s involvement in community projects spans from free medical counseling services to bringing Deepavali joy to Little India, Singapore through a street light up and trade fair held annually during the festive season. Underprivileged Singaporeans in community homes and charities are not forgotten and benefit through Deepavali Cheer, HEB’s annual festive care and share programme.

HEB is responsible for organizing major Hindu festivals like Thaipusam and Firewalking. It also helps other Hindu temples in Singapore on staff matters, religious issues and getting land for relocation of temples. HEB actively supports and is involved in inter religious activities and community service projects organized by the various religious groups in Singapore.

HEB administers the Sivadas-HEB Education Fund, which provides bursaries and tuition subsidies to underprivileged Hindu students, and the Gift from the Heart programme, which provides monthly provisions to disadvantaged Hindu families. Since 2012, the Sivadas-HEB Tertiary Bursary Scheme has disbursed over $5 million to more than 2,000 students.

== History ==
=== Formation of the Hindu Endowments Board ===
The Hindu Endowments Board (HEB) was formed in 1968 by an Act passed in parliament which transferred the management of 4 major Hindu temples from the Mohammedan and Hindu Endowments Board (MHEB). The MHEB was formed in 1907 by the British Empire's government of Colony of Singapore in early Singapore to overcome shortcomings in the management of Hindu and Muslim religious entities.

=== Formation of the Hindu Advisory Board ===
In 1985, the Hindu Advisory Board (HAB) was established to advise the Government and HEB on matters of Hindu religion and customs. Both the Hindu Endowments Board and the Hindu Advisory Board are headed by Chairpersons appointed by the Ministry of Culture, Community and Youth. The HEB comprises a Chairman, a Vice-Chairman, a Finance Member and 12 appointed members. The HAB comprises a Chairman, a Vice-Chairman, a Secretary and 9 members.

=== Recent leadership ===
In December 2025, Sarojini Padmanathan was appointed Chief Executive Officer of HEB, with effect from 24 December 2025, succeeding Jeevaganth Arumugam who had served since September 2024. Padmanathan previously served as HEB's Finance Member and has over four decades of public service experience, including senior roles at the Ministry of Health and the Health Sciences Authority.

== See also ==
- Arya Samaj in Singapore
- List of Hindu temples in Singapore
- List of Hindu temples
- List of Indian organisations in Singapore
