= Bangla Language and Literary Society, Singapore =

The Bangla Language and Literary Society, Singapore (BLLS) was established in 1994 with the goal to teach Bangla (Bengali) language to younger generations who grew up in Singapore.
