= History of Indian Singaporeans =

The history of Singaporean Indians refers to the pattern of ethnic Indian migration and settlement in Singapore from 1819 to the present day. It also includes the social and political history of the Indian community in Singapore during this period.

== Pre-colonial antecedents ==
World map showing Greater India.

Ancient India exerted a profound influence over Southeast Asia through trade, religious missions, wars, and other forms of contact. Pre-colonial Singapore was part of 'Indianized Kingdoms' like Srivijaya and the Majapahit, which formed part of a cultural region known as Greater India.

Before the spread of Islam, Singapore and the rest of the Malay World was Hindu-Buddhist. One of the most extensive and enduring Indian influences in Malay culture is the vast number of Indian loan words in the Malay language.

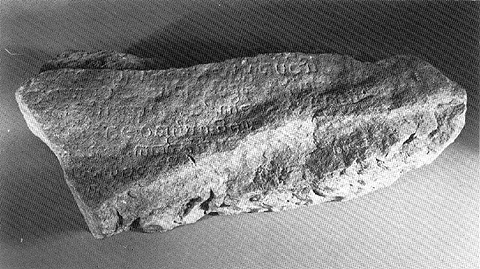
A fragment of the Singapore Stone, inscribed with an Indic script.

Indian influence is also seen in symbols and mythology associated with ancient Singapore. The name 'Singapore' is derived from a Sanskrit term meaning 'Lion City'. The Sejarah Melayu or Malay Annals describe the Malay prince who founded Singapore – Sang Nila Utama – as being a descendant of Alexander the Great and an Indian Princess. Meanwhile, the royal and sacred associations of Fort Canning Hill, the seat of ancient rulers, are related to the Hindu Mount Meru concept.

Archaeological digs have unearthed Hindu-Buddhist artefacts from the pre-colonial period. In 1822, John Crawfurd documented the ruins of a Hindu or Buddhist temple on Fort Canning Hill. Singapore's two most important pre-colonial artefacts are the Singapore Stone, which is inscribed with an Indic script, and a gold armlet bearing the motif of a Hindu 'Kala' head.

== Colonial period 1820s–1950s ==
=== Migration and settlement ===
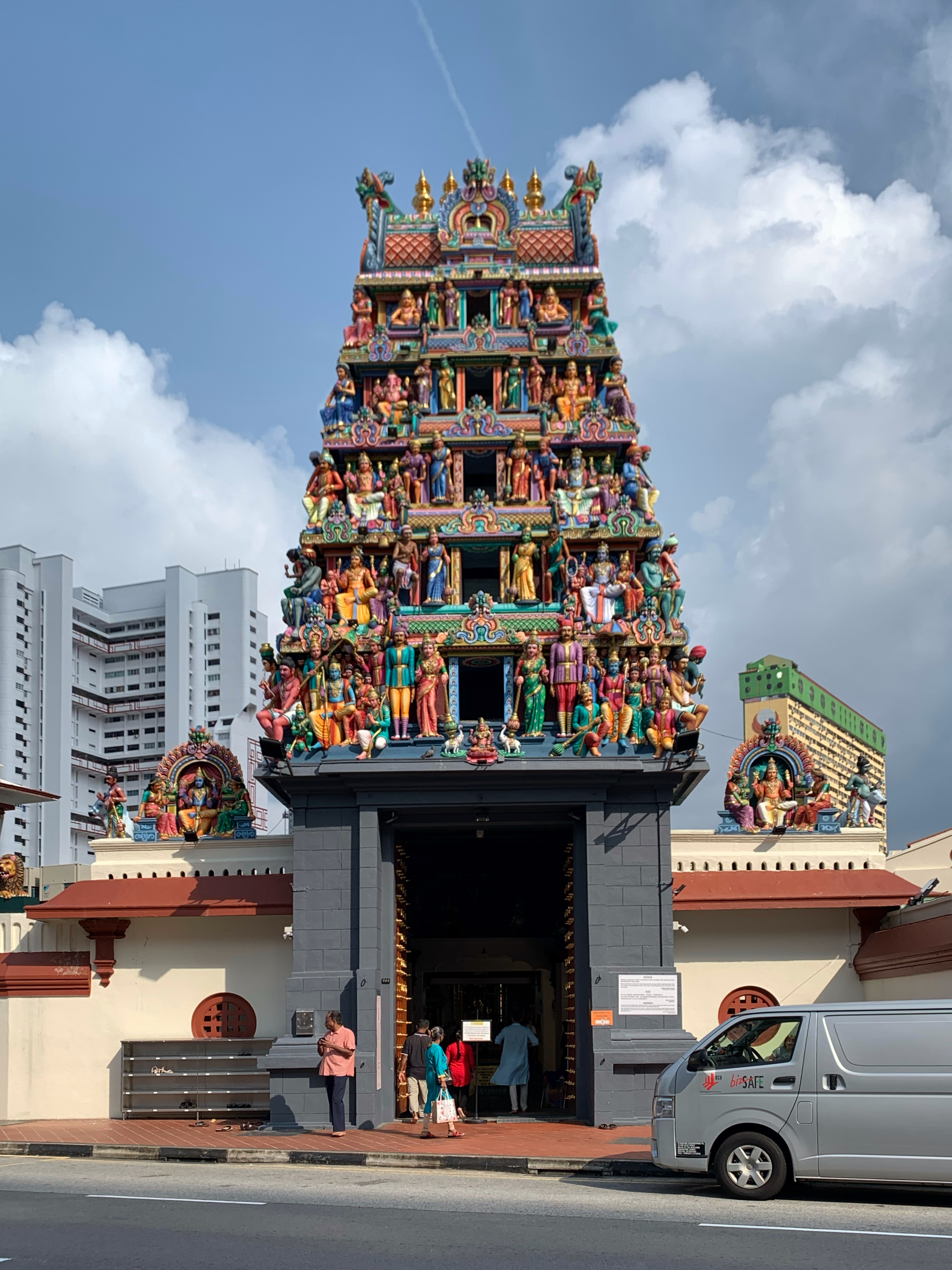
Founded in 1827, Sri Mariamman Temple is Singapore's oldest Hindu temple.

Tamil traders pioneered the settlement of Serangoon in early 19th century. Indian contact was rekindled from 1819 to World War II, when both India and Singapore were under British colonial rule. They also came to Singapore partly because of the unrest and instability the Indians experienced in their homeland which caused them to come to Singapore to seek peace. There were wars and famines going on at that time. By 1824, Singapore's first census counted 756 Indian residents, or about 7% of the total population.

Initially, Indian immigrants were predominantly adult men who came from India to find work, serve military duties or prison sentences for several years before returning home. There was a constant flow of Indians in and out of the city, keeping the local community fairly transient. The influx of Indians in the half century after 1819 led to a brief period when Indians, for the only time, overtook the Malays to become the second largest ethnic group. In 1860, they formed 16% of the population. However, their number then fell from 13,000 that year to 12,000 in 1880, or 8.7% of the population. After this, the proportionate size of the Indian community in colonial Singapore was fairly stable, fluctuating between 7.7% and 9.4%. From the early 20th century, Indians began to settle permanently in greater numbers.

The chart below compiles data from various sources to show the evolution in the relative size of Singapore's Indian community.

Year of census/survey	Percentage of population
1824	6.9%
1860	16.0%
1881	8.7%
1901	7.8%
1911	9.4%
1921	7.8%
1931	9.4%
1947	7.7%
1957	9.0%

=== Social characteristics ===
Scholars have characterised the Indian community in colonial times as being diverse and highly stratified along class lines. According to Dr Rajesh Rai, the social hierarchy comprised four main groups – the educated elite, mercantile groups, the white collar middle class and the uneducated labourers.

Social rank	Group name	Characteristics	Proportion
1.	Educated elite	Generally university-educated professionals, such as lawyers and doctors, as well as senior civil servants. This group was wealthy and led a somewhat 'European' lifestyle.	Over 0.5%
2.	Mercantile class	Petty traders, moneylenders and other traditional business proprietors. Although often wealthy, they occupied a second-tier social rank as they were less well educated than the elite.	Under 10%
3.	Middle class	English-educated white collar service-workers, including middle and junior ranks in the civil and military services. Occupations included teachers, nurses, policemen, postal workers, clerks, etc.	5–7%
4.	Working class	Uneducated and unskilled manual labourers, or 'coolies'. They often worked at the port docks, in construction or private warehouses or factories.	Over 80%

Occupation and class were also linked to ethnic background within the Singapore Indian community.

- The English educated: Sri Lankan Tamils and Malayalees were brought to work as clerks in the civil service and European firms, as there were few locals qualified to do these jobs. Others became teachers, journalists, nurses, doctors and lawyers. They formed the core of the educated Indian middle and upper classes.

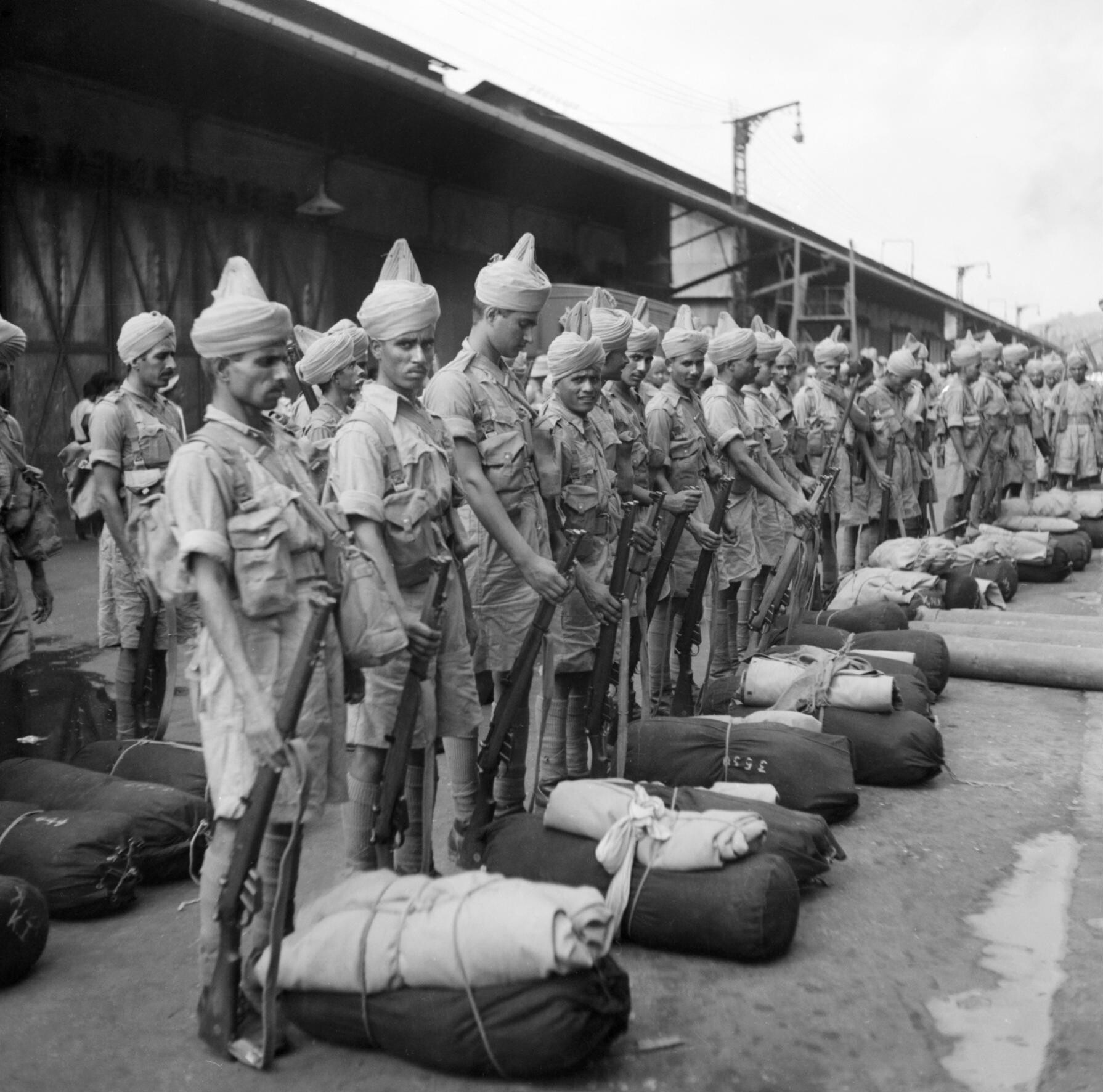
Indian troops in Singapore, 1941.

- Merchants: key communities, like the Sindhis, Gujaratis, Parsis, and Tamil Muslims ran family businesses, which ranged from petty shopkeeping to major mercantile firms.
- Traditional trades: skilled workers and craftsmen performed a range of job from goldsmiths to priests. Most were South Indian caste Hindus. For example, the Tamil Chettiar caste achieved fame and fortune as moneylenders.
- Soldiers: the first Indians in Singapore were 120 sepoys in the Bengal Native Infantry and a 'bazaar contingent' of washermen, servants and others who came with Stamford Raffles on his first visit in 1819. Throughout the colonial period, military personnel came from all over India. Most returned home after their service without settling in Singapore.
- Security personnel: Sikh men found their niche working in the police or as private guards. They were valued for being bigger built than other Asians, and for having impressive turbans and beards. In the colonial period, Chinese businessmen sometimes decorated their buildings and graves with sculptures of Sikh guards at the entrance.
- Coolies: a large number of Indian migrants were rural Tamils and Telugus who were landless peasants including many from shudra castes as well as Adi Dravidas or '(untouchables)'. They were transient unskilled workers who performed manual labour at the docks and construction sites. They were stereotypically seen as (and valued for being) docile.
- Convicts: in the 19th century, the British shipped Indian convicts to Singapore to relieve overcrowded Indian jails. These men (and some women) were used as labour to build public buildings and roads in Singapore. Like the sepoys, they came from all parts of India. While some returned to India, several settled in Singapore after serving their sentences.

=== Socio-cultural reform movements ===
From the 19th century, Hindu reform movements emerged in India as part of a broader cultural modernisation. These movements sought to promote what they saw as a more authentic form of Hinduism while addressing the abuses, such as the Hindu caste system. These movements spread to overseas Indian communities, including Singapore.

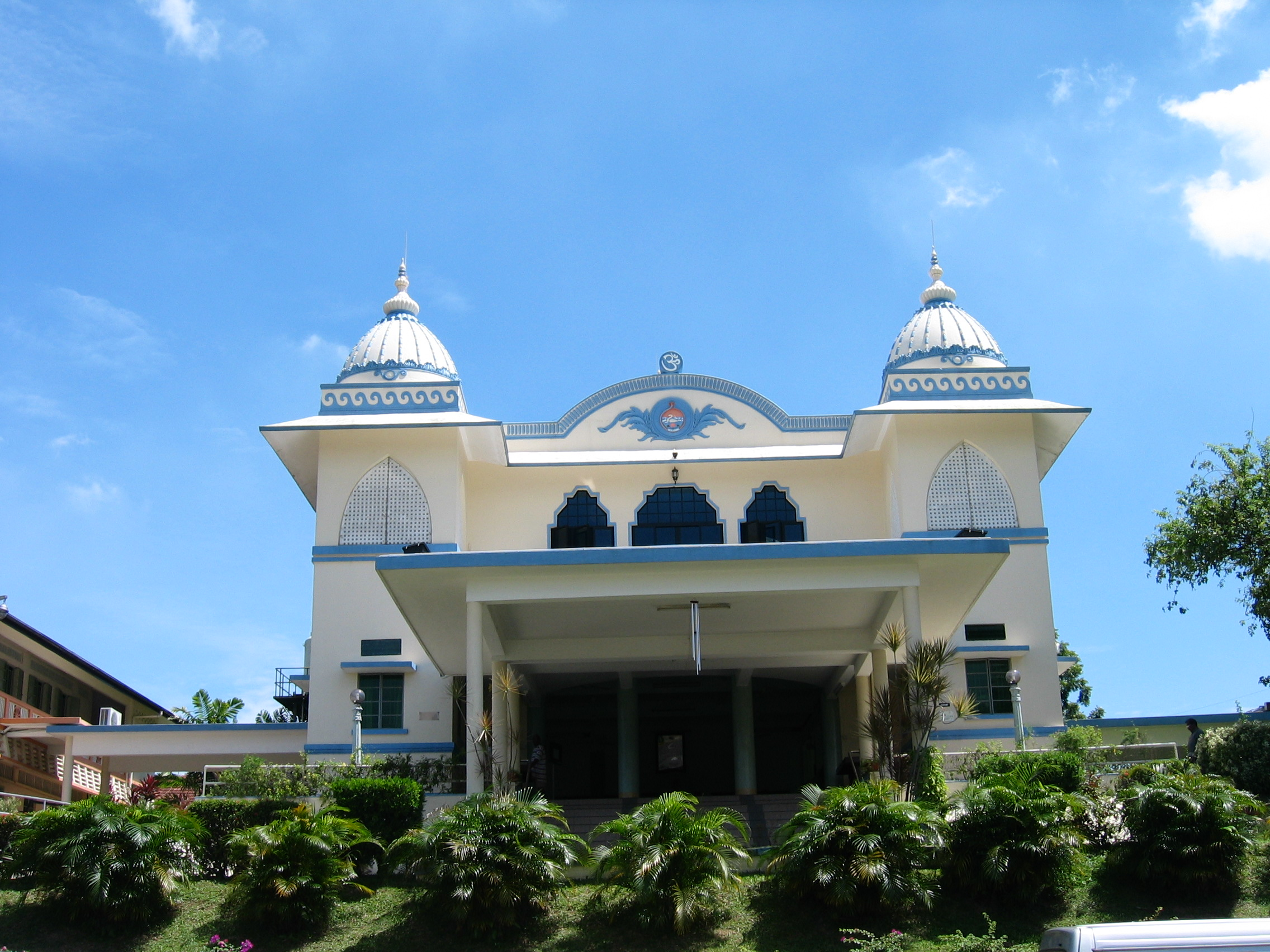
Ramakrishna Mission building in Singapore.

One of the most prominent examples was the Ramakrishna Mission. It was founded by Sri Ramakrishna's chief disciple and religious leader, Swami Vivekananda in 1897. It conducted missionary and philanthropic work, including operating a home for boys from troubled families in Singapore.

The Arya Samaj was another Hindu reform movement with a presence in Singapore. It was founded in India by Swami Dayananda in 1875. He was a sannyasi (renouncer) who believed in the infallible authority of the Vedas. The group was popular among some North Indian Hindus in Singapore, but failed to gather much support from the rest of the Hindu community.

The Sree Narayana Mission was another group from India that, like the Ramakrishna Mission, engaged in the provision of social welfare services. It currently runs a home for destitute older people of all races and religions in Singapore.

Another important movement was the Self-Respect Movement, which emerged in Tamil Nadu to liberate Adi Dravidas and lower caste Tamils from what was seen as Brahmin oppression. This movement sought inspiration from Tamil history and culture. In Singapore, groups like the Tamil Reform Council were inspired by this movement. Leaders like Thamizhavel G. Sarangapani focussed on moral, social and religious reform. For example, they campaigned against alcohol abuse, which was a problem among the coolie class. These groups also promoted the use of the Tamil language, and the development of Tamil literature in Singapore. They were also involved in the union activism, especially in those work sectors dominated by Tamils. Tamil-educated journalists and teachers were at the forefront of the Tamil Reform movement.

=== The 1915 Singapore Mutiny ===
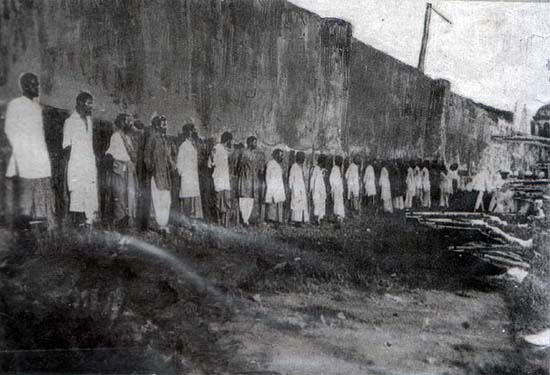
Sepoy mutineers awaiting execution in 1915.

The 1915 Singapore Mutiny, also known as the 1915 Sepoy Mutiny, was an incident concerning 850 sepoys (Indian soldiers) who mutinied against the British on 15 February 1915 in Singapore, as part of the 1915 Ghadar Conspiracy (not to be mistaken for the Indian Mutiny of 1857). The mainly Muslim sepoys mutinied because they believed they were being sent to fight for the British against Muslim Turks, as part of the First World War. This mutiny lasted nearly 7 days, and resulted in the deaths of 47 British soldiers and local civilians. The mutineers were later rounded up and executed. In general, the mutiny was restricted to the Muslim sepoys and did not involve the wider Indian population.

=== Indian nationalism ===
While the mutiny was a significant event in the history of Singapore, and one of the most important ones specifically involving the Indian community, it was somewhat distinct from the mainstream development of Indian nationalist sentiments in the local Indian population, which emerged most prominently around the time of the Second World War.

Nationalist movements in India established branch organisations in Singapore to draw on local Indian support for Indian independence. The Indian Independence League was a political organisation operated from the 1920s to the 1940s to organize those living outside of India to remove the British from India. Founded in 1928 by Indian nationalists Subhas Chandra Bose and Jawaharlal Nehru, the organisation was active in Singapore and Malaya following Japan's successful Malayan Campaign in the Second World War.

The Indian National Army (INA) was an armed force formed by Indian nationalists in 1942 in Southeast Asia, also during World War II. Their aim was to overthrow the British Raj in colonial India, with Japanese assistance. Many Indian soldiers and civilians were recruited in Singapore and Malaya to join the INA during the Japanese occupation. Many of them died fighting alongside the Japanese against the British in Burma during the war.

== Post-colonial history: 1960s – present ==
=== Immediate post-colonial period: 1960s – 1980s ===
Scholars have identified two phases in the development of the Indian community after Singaporean independence in 1965. The first phase, from 1965 to the early 1990s, saw a decline in the proportion of the community from 9% in 1957 to a low of 6.4% in 1980. One reason was the withdrawal of British military forces in the early 1970s, which led to the repatriation of many Indian base workers. Another factor was the retirement of older men, who chose to return to families in India. Meanwhile, post-1965 immigration restrictions ended new migration from India. Furthermore, there was a rise in the emigration of Indian Singaporeans to the West in the late 1980s. During this time, the Indian population continued to grow in absolute terms due to natural increase. Even as it grew smaller, the community also became more settled, with several new generations born locally.

From the 1960s to 1980s, the People's Action Party government tried to cultivate a shared national identity and to end the historical tendency of Singaporeans to identify with the national – and often nationalistic – politics of their ancestral homelands. While different ethnic groups were allowed, and sometimes encouraged to retain their cultural identities, they were also pushed to integrate socially, politically and economically across ethnic lines. The government pursued policies to integrate the races in public housing estates and national schools. Young men underwent two years of compulsory national service in ethnically mixed military or police camps. Traditional family businesses were superseded by government agencies or foreign multi-national corporations, which hired multi-ethnic workforces on the basis of meritocratic ability rather than kinship or ethnicity. Consequently, "the cultivation of a Singaporean identity has been largely successful in converting Indian migrants into Indian-Singaporeans". In general, Indian social patterns and political activities became aligned and integrated within the national mainstream from the 1960s.

Although the Singapore government championed public policies and a political discourse of racial integration and national identity, it came to recognise that important differences in the socio-economic profiles of the three main races continued to endure in the post-colonial period. Initially, it had set up Mendaki, a quasi-autonomous Malay community self-help group to promote educational advancement within that community to address underperformance by Malay students. In the 1980s, this approach – which was initially seen as an exceptional measure taken in the case of the Malay community – became entwined with the rhetoric of Asian values, which saw the promotion of a greater consciousness and pride in each citizen's own ethnic heritage, as a bulwark against the supposedly negative influences of Western cultural influences. Consequently, the government established the Singapore Indian Development Association (SINDA) in 1991 to address the educational and social problems of the Indian community. Shortly after, a similar body was set up for the majority Chinese community.

Apart from ethnic self-help groups like SINDA (which remain controversial in Singapore), the government has in the main pursued policies emphasising racial integration and national identity. It is against this backdrop that immigration policies were liberalised in the 1990s, leading to an influx of foreigners in Singapore, particularly Indian nationals. This led to a new phase in the history of the Indian community in Singapore.

=== Contemporary period: 1990s – present ===
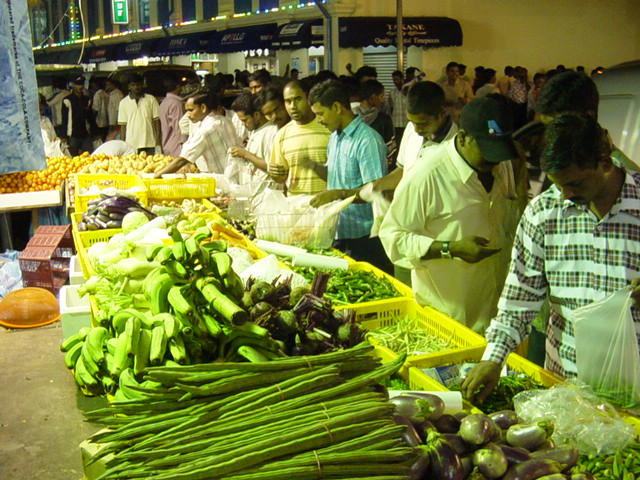
Foreign construction workers at Little India.

A second phase began in the early 1990s, when immigration policies were liberalised to attract foreign professionals to boost the size and skills of the local workforce. The government was keen to draw in well educated migrants from Asian countries who, it was hoped, would be both keen and able to settle permanently. This also addressed the problem of Singapore's extremely low fertility rates. In addition to these professionals, unskilled foreign workers were recruited as low cost manual labour for construction sites and the cleaning sector, albeit without the prospect of permanent settlement.

As a result of these policies, the Indian population grew faster than other groups. The proportion of Indian citizens and permanent residents rose from 6.4% in 1980 to 9.0% in 2007. This was mainly due to rapid growth in the number of Indian nationals who acquired Singapore permanent residency. The changes in the size of the Indian community were also matched by changes in its socio-economic profile. Skilled immigrants have helped to raise the average income and educational levels of the community, helping to elevate the general stature of Indians in Singapore. At the same time, there is some ambivalence, and occasionally tension, between Indian immigrants on the one hand, and locally born Indians and other Singaporeans on the other. In some respects, locally born Indians shares the anxieties and mixed feelings towards new immigrants (including ethnic Indians) that their Chinese and Malay counterparts feel.

The chart below compiles data from various sources to show the evolution in the relative size of Singapore's Indian community.

Year of census/survey	Percentage of population
1957	9.0%
1970	7.2%
1980	6.4%
1990	7.1%
2000	7.9%
2007	9.0%

== See also ==
- Context
  - 1915 Singapore Mutiny
  - Greater India
  - History of Indian influence on Southeast Asia
  - Indian diaspora
  - Indianisation
  - Indian National Army in Singapore
  - Hinduism in Southeast Asia
- Indian-origin religions and people in Singapore
  - Arya Samaj in Singapore
  - Hinduism in Singapore
  - Jainism in Singapore
  - Indian Singaporeans
  - List of Hindu temples in Singapore
  - List of Indian organisations in Singapore
