= Masjid Al-Falah, Singapore =

Mosque in Orchard, Singapore

Masjid Al-Falah مسجد الفلاح
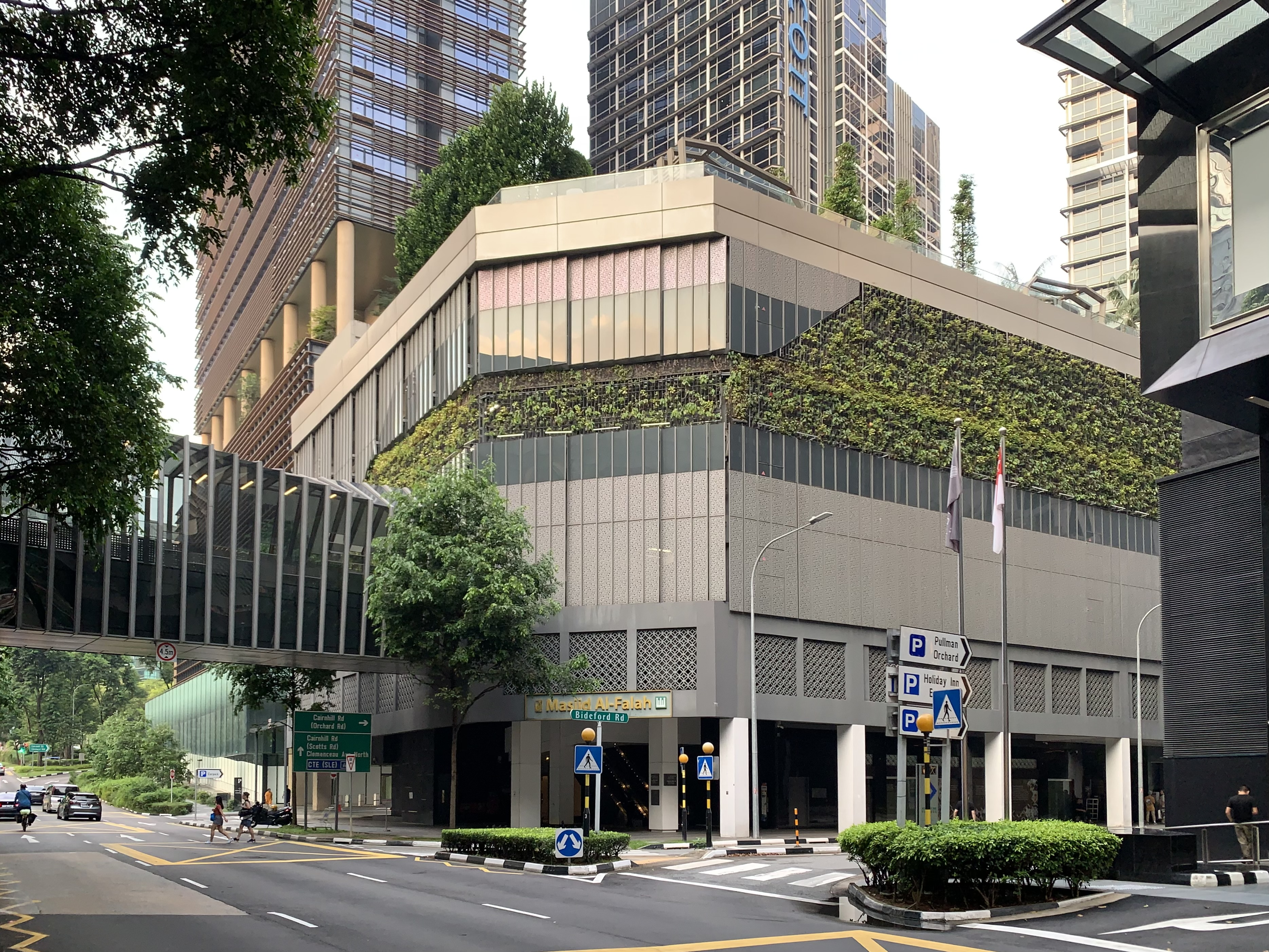
- Main facade of the mosque, as seen from Bideford Road.

- Location in Singapore

Religion
- Affiliation: Sunni Islam

Location
- Location: 22 Bideford Rd, #01-01, Singapore 229923
- Country: Singapore
- Interactive map of Masjid Al-Falah مسجد الفلاح
- Coordinates: 1.3037616°N 103.8364991°E

Architecture
- Type: Mosque
- Style: Modern architecture
- Established: 1985
- Completed: 1986

Masjid Al-Falah is a mosque located along Bideford Road in Orchard, Singapore. Opened in 1987, it is a heritage site of the Orchard Road area. Its name Al-Falah is an Arabic word that is literally translated to "The Success." Situated under a 32-storey commercial complex and apartment building, the mosque mainly serves workers and tourists in the Orchard Road area.

== History ==
Formerly, the sole mosque that served areas around Orchard Road was Masjid Angullia (not to be confused with the current Masjid Angullia at Rochor), built in 1933 by the Angullias, a prestigious Indian Muslim family. It belonged to the Sunni sect of Islam and could accommodate at least five hundred worshippers, while being recognizable on its exterior for its minarets and gateway that resembled the main building of the Afaq Khoja Mausoleum. Masjid Angullia was then demolished in 1985 to make way for the construction of shopping centres along Orchard Road. Hence in the 1980s, plans were confirmed for the construction of a mosque along Bideford Road to serve the Muslim workers and tourists in the newly-defined Orchard planning area.

The name of the new mosque was chosen to be Masjid Al-Falah, while the committee of the mosque had been formed as early as 1985. During the construction of the mosque in mid 1986, Fahd of Saudi Arabia gifted the mosque with plush carpets, while an ambassador to Singapore from the Saudi consul named Abdul Rahman Al Tuaimi was allowed an early preview and guided tour of the incomplete mosque. On 8 September of the same year, the mosque also received a donation from the committee of Masjid Aminah, another mosque at Geylang, that was set to be demolished. Masjid Al-Falah was officially completed on 1 December 1986, but only a section of the mosque was deemed useable and opened for workers at Orchard Road to pray at, functioning as a musalla rather than a mosque.

The mosque was officially opened and inaugurated on 25 January 1987 by Ahmad Mattar, the Minister-in-Charge of Muslim Affairs. The mosque also held its first Eid prayer on 29 May of the same year, along with an event to help raise funds for the mosque and its associated charities. It is one of the few mosques in Singapore that conducts sermons and classes prominently in English, unlike other mosques which have a prominence on the Malay language.

== Architecture ==
Built in a modernized architectural style that lacks any domes or minarets, Masjid Al-Falah is rectangular in layout and has two levels, with the interior being composed of marble and hence having a mainly white and cream coloured appearance to evoke feelings of calmness. The main prayer hall and male ablution area are situated on the ground level, while the female prayer hall and ablution area can be found on the second level. Administrative offices, reading areas, and sanitation facilities including toilets can be found on both levels of the mosque. Situated atop the mosque is a commercial building that is thirty-two storeys high, while a public carpark stands behind the mosque. Overall, the mosque has a total capacity of 1,500 worshippers.

== Transportation ==
Masjid Al-Falah is within walking distance from the Somerset MRT station on the North–South MRT line.

== See also ==
- Islam in Singapore
- List of mosques in Singapore
