= Sri Thendayuthapani Temple =

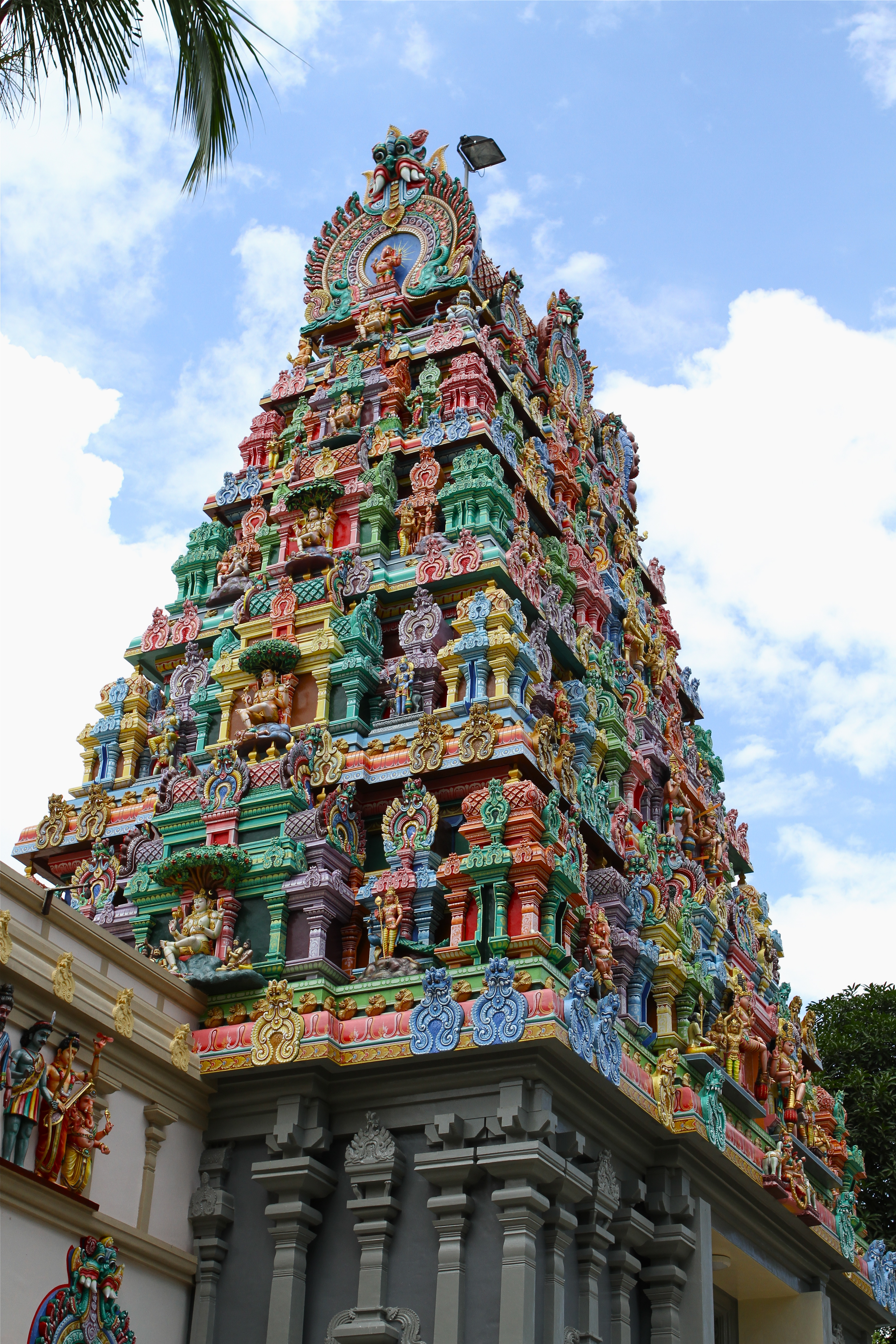
- Sri Thendayuthapani Temple in 2009

- Location within Singapore
- 1.2943222°N 103.840853°E
- Type: Hindu Temple
- Location: 15 Tank Road, Singapore 238065

History
- Built: 1859; 167 years ago

National monument of Singapore
- Designated: 20 October 2014; 11 years ago
- Reference no.: 67

The Sri Thendayuthapani Temple, better known as the Chettiars' Temple, is one of Singapore Hindu community's most important monuments. The temple was built by the Chettiars (Indian moneylenders) at Tank Road in 1859 and managed by the Chettiars' Temple Society. The temple was reconstructed in 1983 and renovated in 2022. The temple was gazetted as a National monument of Singapore on 20 October 2014.

== Worship ==
The Hindu temple is dedicated to Muruga.

On the eve of Thaipusam, the statue of Murugan is paraded from the temple through the city to Sri Layan Sithi Vinayagar Temple, another Chettiar temple located at Keong Saik Road in Chinatown, and then back to Sri Thendayuthapani Temple. On Thaipsuam, devotees will walk from Sri Srinivasa Perumal Temple on Serangoon Road, with their bodies pierced by hooks, spears and spiked steel structures called kavadi, or carry paal kudams (milk pots) on their heads, to Sri Thendayuthapani Temple as an act of penance in gratitude to Lord Murugan for granting their prayers of supplication.

== History ==
In 1859, the Sri Thendayuthapani Temple was constructed at Tank Road for worship for the Hindu deity, Lord Muruga, by the Chettiar community in Singapore.

In the late 1970s, it was decided to reconstruct the temple at a cost of S$3.3 million which is paid by the Chettiar community. The reconstruction was done by 1983 and was consecrated on 24 November 1983.

In 2022, the temple was renovated, including reconstructing the Meenakshi Amman sanctum, replacement of temple floors and repainting the sanctum walls and columns, at a cost of about $1 million.
