= Indian National Army in Singapore =

Indian military wing in Singapore

The Indian National Army (INA) was a Japanese sponsored Indian military wing in Southeast Asia during the World War II, particularly active in Singapore, that was officially formed in April 1942 and disbanded in August 1945. It was formed with the help of the Japanese forces and was made up of roughly about 45 000 Indian prisoner of war (POWs) of British Indian Army, who were captured after the fall of Singapore on 15 February 1942. It was initially formed by Rash Behari Bose who headed it till April 1942 before handing the lead of INA over to Subhas Chandra Bose in 1943.

INA was involved in various military operations fighting under the command of the Japanese forces against the British and Allied forces. They are notable for their contributions to the battle fought in Burma, Imphal and Kohima.

Following the defeat of the Japanese, the INA was dissolved in August 1945. The British Raj, never seriously threatened by the INA, charged 300 INA officers with treason in the INA trials, but eventually backtracked in the face of opposition by the Congress. These trials became a galvanising point in the Indian Independence movement for the Indian National Congress. A number of people associated with the INA during the war later went on to hold important roles in public life in India as well as in other countries in Southeast Asia, most notably Lakshmi Sehgal in India, and John Thivy and Janaki Athinahappan in Malaya.

== Background and Context ==
=== Mahatma Gandhi's Non-Cooperation Movement ===
One of the more significant independent movements which brought together hundreds of thousands of Indians was Mahatma Gandhi's Non-Cooperation Movement between 1920 and 1922 which aimed to reject British rule through non-violent means such as boycotting British products and consuming only local products. This movement also strengthened nationalistic feelings amongst the Indian population both in India as well as other parts of the world. As a result of this movement Gandhi was arrested and he spent two years in jail. However, the effects of this movement were far reaching as it spurred the emergence of a newer generation of Indians from the Congress Party such as, Jawaharlal Nehru, C. Rajagopalachari and Subhas Chandra Bose (who would eventually become the leader of the INA) who would later on actively advocate for India's independence.

=== Pre-1942 Conditions in Singapore and Malaya ===
In 1941, with the impending arrival of the Japanese troops to the Malay Peninsula during the World War II, the British government had begun sending a large number of Indian troops to the Malay Peninsula and Singapore. It was estimated that were some 37 000 Indian troops stationed in these areas, making up roughly about the 40 percent of the total military strength of the British forces. However, the British-Indian troops stationed begun to experience various problems.

Firstly, the British military was beginning to be spread too thinly and they were unable to allocate much of their resources to the military set up in the Malay Peninsula and Singapore. Secondly, although it appears that the number British-Indian troops swelled from 200,000 to 900,000 between 1939 and 1941, it was made up of very young boys (as a result of the open recruitment policy of the British) who had very little or no combat training and experience, leading to anxiety amongst the British-Indian forces.

Thirdly, the British had already begun to suspect that not all of their Indian Army personnel were loyal to them. This was largely because, towards the end of 1942, the British government had to resort to indiscriminate recruitment in order to maintain the numbers for its army, meaning that it was no longer carefully curating its selection for the armed forces and consequently the British Indian Army was no longer filled with single minded individuals fighting for the same cause. The antagonistic feeling towards the British amongst the Indian soldiers were due to numerous instances of poor treatment they received. By 1941, significant discontent at the abusive attitudes of their British officers was widespread among Indian soldiers.

As such, due to a combination of the above-mentioned factors and conditions, by 1941, the morale of the Indian Army troops was very low and this set up the stage for many soldiers to switch loyalties to the Japanese in 1942.

=== The Role of the Japanese in the formation of the INA ===
The circumstances leading up to the formation of the INA have been contested. While some scholars have gone down the nationalistic road, newer scholars have instead challenged these claims and with the aid of new sources been able to shed a different light on the same event. Early accounts trace the founding of the INA to the spontaneous uprising of nationalism among Indian troops in Malaya. More recent accounts, however, suggest the Japanese played a central role in its formation and development.

Plans by the Japanese forces to influence the British-Indian soldiers in Singapore and Malaya had begun as early September 1941. Major Iwaichi Fujiwara was the officer assigned by the Japanese government to head to Bangkok to undertake efforts to “engage in intelligence operations intended to cultivate...Japanese Indian cooperation”. As the first step in his efforts, Major Fujiwara sought out the highly popular but controversial Indian Nationalist, Pritam Singh who had fled from India to avoid arrest by the British government. Pritam Singh was also the General Secretary of the Indian Independence League (IIL) in Thailand, as part of a larger anti-British political organization which operated in various parts of Southeast Asia.

Fujiwara and Pritam held a series of secret discussions during the months of October and November 1941. During these meetings, Pritam managed to convince Fujiwara that the loyalties of the British Indian soldiers could only be attained if the Japanese authorities would promise the future prisoners of war the sparring of their lives. Additionally, Pritam also persuaded Fujiwara to assure the British-Indian soldiers that the Japanese forces would assist the Indians in gaining independence from British colonial rule. Major Fujiwara guaranteed Pritam Singh that they did not harbour any “political, economic, cultural or religious” intentions in India and they would respect the “property and freedom of Indians in territory that came under the sway of the Japanese”.

Following that, Pritam Singh and Major Fujiwara followed the movement of the Japanese troops during their journey from Southern Thailand to Malaya. As they advanced towards Northern Malaya in December 1941, the Japanese forces were able to capture British-Indian soldiers from the 1/14 Punjab regiment and their leader Mohan Singh who would go on to lead the INA later. Mohan Singh was tasked by Fujiwara to “manage the POWs and to maintain law and order in the area”. During this period, Fujiwara was greatly convinced by Mohan Singh's leadership abilities and as such sought Mohan Singh's compliance to aid the Japanese efforts. He also offered Mohan Singh the opportunity to captain this new Indian army .

Although, initially conflicted as he had heard horrific stories about the torture tactics employed by the Japanese forces, Mohan Singh believed that the proposed new Indian armed forces and cooperation with the Japanese forces, would act as a defence mechanism for “Indian soldiers and to protect Indian civilians and property from Japanese exploitation”. As such, Mohan Singh was inclined to agree to Fujiwara's proposal, on the strict condition that Fujiwara agreed to five conditions dictated by Singh. These conditions were:

1. Full assistance and collaboration would be extended by the Japanese army in the formation of liberation army for India.

2. The present IIL and INA should not be conflated with each other and be allowed to exist separately.

3. The POWs should come solely under the purview of Mohan Singh.

4. Indian POWs should be offered a choice about whether they wanted to join the INA and POWs who refuse should not be subjected to any form of torture by the Japanese forces.

5. The soon to be formed INA should be treated as an ‘allied army’ by the Japanese forces.

Fujiwara acceded to Singh's request. Consequently, Mohan Singh was told to immediately head a propaganda movement in order to convince British-Indian soldiers to join the newly formed INA. By January 1942, this propaganda movement led by Mohan Singh was in full force.

== Establishing the INA ==
=== The Farrer Park Meeting ===
It was during the Farrer Park Meeting on 17 February 1942, that Fujiwara and Mohan Singh first addressed the 45 000 strong British-Indian POWs. Major Fujiwara assured the POWs that they would be treated as comrades as opposed to POWs. He also repeatedly assured the POWs that if they complied with the Japanese forces, they would be provided with the support and resources to fight against the British forces and clinch independence for India. Fujiwara had hoped that appealing to the nationalistic consciousness and patriotic feelings of these soldiers would enable him to win their support. Despite Fujiwara's impassioned plea, many of the POWs remained unconvinced. It was only when the charismatic Mohan Singh addressed them next, urging them to “seize the opportunity and rise for the motherland” that the POWs begun to seriously consider the proposal to join the INA.

Although the POWs were not coerced into making an immediate decision with regard to joining the INA, the general consensus was that many of the POWs with the exceptions of the higher ranking British officials and the Gurkha contingent were sufficiently convinced.

=== Treatment of the Indians under the Early Japanese Rule ===
It would not be until 9 May 1942 that the INA would come into full effect. However, following the events of 17 February 1942 Farrer Park meeting, the Indians in Singapore begun to enjoy special privileges during the Japanese ‘pacification’ of Singapore . This was clearly seen in the vastly different ways in which the Japanese treated the Indians and Chinese. During these early months, it was reported that roughly 50 000 Chinese in Singapore and the Malayan Peninsula were brutally killed in what is now known as the ‘Sook Ching Massacre’ . In contrast, the Indians received far more lenient treatment. However, this is not to say that the Indians felt no fear at all. In fact, the attitudes of the Japanese forces towards the Chinese population did instill some fear in the general Indian civilian population as well as leaders such as Pritam Singh. This was significant for the Indian leaders, during the Farrer Park meeting who had expressed reservations about collaborating with the Japanese as these incidents further cemented their initial beliefs about the cruel nature of the Japanese and would further affirm their decision to not join the INA in May 1942.

=== Pledging Allegiance to the INA ===
==== First Indian National Army formed by General Mohan Singh ====
Prior to the arrival of Subhash Chandra Bose in Singapore in July 1943, the Indian POW were recruited by the Mohan Singh for the cause of an independent India, it was called the First Indian National Army.

In the months following the Farrer Park meeting and the eventual formation of the INA in May 1942, Indian and Japanese leaders held various meetings with the most notable one held in Tokyo between 28 March 1942 and 30 March 1942. It was during this meeting that Indian leaders carefully negotiated the terms of the INA with the Japanese officials. It was during these series of meetings that Mohan Singh was officially appointed as Commander in Chief for the INA.

The ‘Bidadari Resolutions’ negotiated between Mohan and other senior Indian officials was formalized on 27 April 1942. These resolutions mandated that the official recruitment for the INA could begin on 8 May 1942 . Mohan Singh continued his attempts to convince the Indian POWs to join the INA. He was rather successful as by September 1942, he was able to recruit more than 40 000 soldiers. Even though it was initially largely believed that many POWs joined the INA because of a burst of nationalistic consciousness, in recent years, it has been uncovered through the reading of other court documents and previously classified government documents that there were other compelling reasons such as anger towards the British officials, the perceived sense of security offered by the Japanese in exchange for the loyalty of the POWs and also the promise of escape from malnutrition and starvation .

The vast difference in treatments provided to those who joined the INA and those who refused further prompted those who initially did not wish to join to change their minds. The Indian POWs who aligned themselves with the INA were often well fed and given simpler, less taxing duties to perform. They were given great amounts of freedom in these camps (termed as volunteer camps) and were entitled to various forms of entertainment such as “patriotic theatrical and song nights that were also used as instruments to get POWs to join the INA”. In a blatant violation of the conditions set by Mohan Singh prior to the formation of the INA, which would later serve as a source of conflict between Singh and the Japanese forces, the POWs who chose to not join the INA were subject to great physical and mental torture as they were sent to ‘concentration camps’, where they were deprived of food, medical aid and other basic rights. An excerpt from Bryon Farewell details some of the methods and techniques that the Japanese used to coerce the Indian POWs into join the INA.

“When none of the Singapore prisoners of 2/2nd or the 2/9th Gurkhas signed up for the I.N.A., their Gurkha officers and N.C.O.s were taken away to Skeleton Camp for intensive coercion.… Twenty-six were selected for brutal treatment, then returned to camp ‘to think again’… [Gurkha officers] were made to work at heavy tasks, clubbed with rifle butts, brutally beaten with poles, and sand was mixed with their food.… Subadar- Major Chethabahadur of the 2/9th was put in a small cage, starved, left for long periods in solitary confinement and beaten…. Subadar-Major Harisung Bohra of the 2/2nd was blinded and repeatedly beaten with bamboo poles; he died of internal hemorrhages.”.

To further complicate matters, it was not just the Japanese who were engaged in torturing the Indian POWs. There have been various reports suggesting that the INA formed its own version of the much feared Japanese Kempeitai which employed various torturous measures in order to coerce the POWs to join the INA.

==== Arrival of Bose and formation of INA ====
When Subhas Chandra Bose arrived in Singapore in July 1943 to materialise the goal of an independent India, and he mobilised the Indian manpower including civilians and financial resources in East and South-East Asia. He gave instructions that no coercion should be used in recruitment. First Indian National Army raised by Mohan Singh became part of the Second Indian National Army led by Bose. The combined force was simply called the Indian National Army (INA).

== 21 October 1943: proclamation of Free India at Cathay Building in Singapore ==
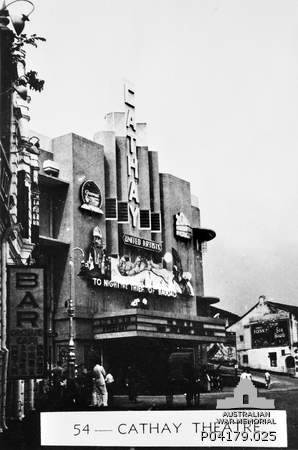
The Cathay Building Cinema in 1945 where Free India was proclaimed on 21 October 1943.

On 21 October 1943, Subhas Chandra Bose proclaimed the formation of the Provisional Government of Azad Hind (Free India) at Cathay Building with himself as the Head of State, Prime Minister and Minister of War. The Japanese utilised the building to broadcast propaganda in the Japanese language. This government was recognised by several nations and went on to capture India's Andaman and Nicobar Islands from the British colonial rule.

In the name of God, in the name of bygone generations who have welded the Indian people into one nation, and in the name of the dead heroes who have bequeathed to us a tradition of heroism and self-sacrifice we call upon the Indian people to rally round our banner and strike for India's freedom. We call upon them to launch the final struggle against the British and their allies in India and to prosecute that struggle with valour and perseverance and full faith in final victory until the enemy is expelled from Indian soil and the Indian people are once again a Free Nation.

— Subhas Chandra Bose proclaiming the Free India at Cathay Cinema Building in Singapore on 21 October 1943,

The Cathay Building, which was earlier used as cinema, hotel, nightclub, restaurant, etc. was redeveloped in 1999. The front facade of its theatre building structure was gazetted as a national monument for conservation on 10 February 2003, while the rest of the building structure was later demolished. Thus the new building incorporated conservation of the original art-deco façade of the 1939 and combined together with a modern-day design. The Cathay as it is currently known, was opened on 24 March 2006. The 17 story building now houses the retail, food & beverage outlets, an 8-screen Cathay Cineplex and the residential units.

== Leaders of the INA ==
Scholars have generally agreed that both Mohan Singh and Subhas Chandra Bose were influential figures. However, earlier scholars, who were writing at a time when the Indian government had begun to portray Bose as a nationalistic hero, tended to accord much of the success of the INA to Bose. However, scholars from newer non-nationalistic historical traditions, supported by access to newer historical sources, argue that both Singh and Bose were major players in the formation and maintenance of the INA.

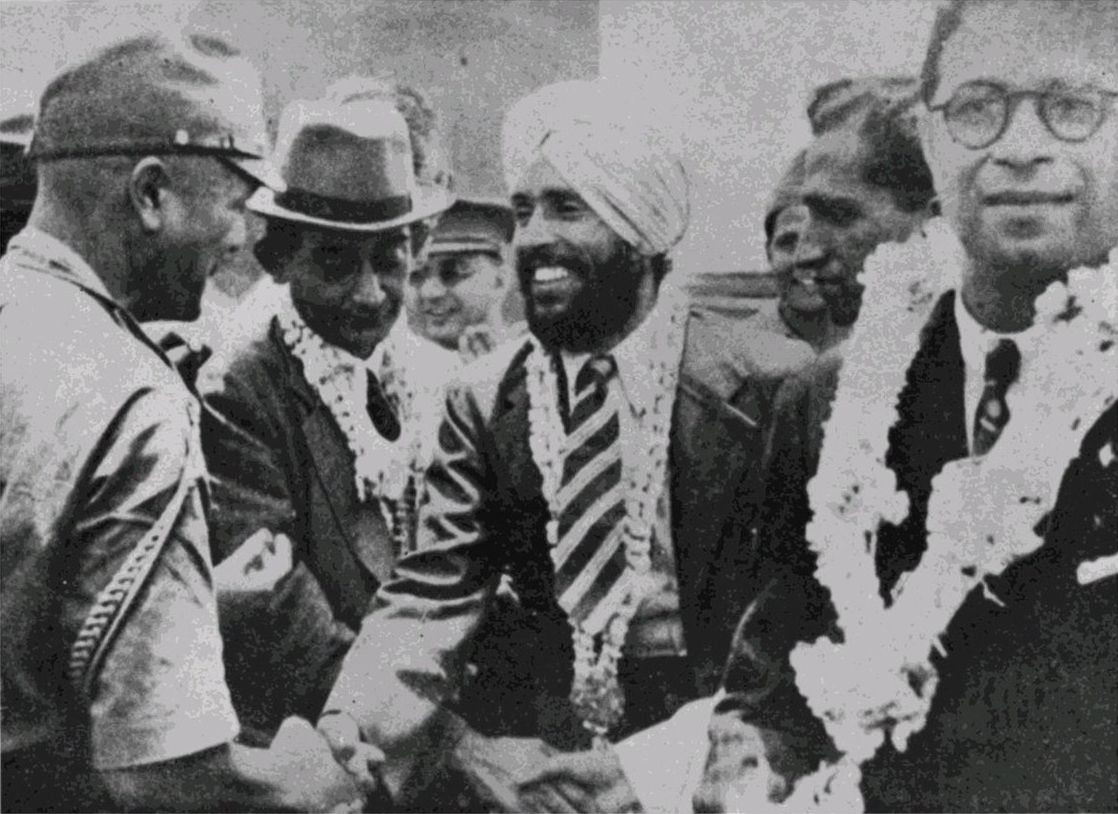
Captain Mohan Singh in a meeting with Japanese Major Iwaichi Fujiwara

=== Mohan Singh ===
Captain Mohan Singh was a soldier of the 1/14th Punjab regiment and a member of the British-Indian forces. He and his troops were captured by the Japanese forces in the Northern part of Malaya in December 1941. Singh believed that the British were exploiting the Indians. His desire to gain Indian independence from British rule was one of the main reasons that he agreed to captain the INA and formed an alliance with the Japanese forces albeit with some conditions set to protect the Indians. Singh was instrumental in recruiting many of the British-Indian POWs to become members of the INA and also actively partook in their training.

However, towards the end of 1942, Mohan Singh begun to have disagreements with the Japanese authorities. He felt that the Japanese authorities had not kept their promises of treating the Indians as equals largely because they Indian troops were not provided with the latest military equipment and many of them were asked to do laborer jobs. Singh became increasingly disillusioned with the Japanese forces and surmised that the “Japanese ‘wanted the army [INA] and the organization to be just a show piece and a convenient puppet, but not a strong and powerful reality which may become a problem for them later on, thwart their secret designs on India”.

As the Japanese forces felt that Singh was increasingly uncooperative, they feared that he would influence the rest of the INA to rebel against the Japanese as well. As such, Mohan Singh was dismissed from his position as captain and was arrested by the Japanese military police on 29 December 1942.

After the defeat of the Japanese forces, Singh was sent to India face trial for his role in the INA. However, due to the overwhelming support he received from the Indian population, he was dismissed from the Army and faced no other form of punishment. He eventually pursued a career as a politician.

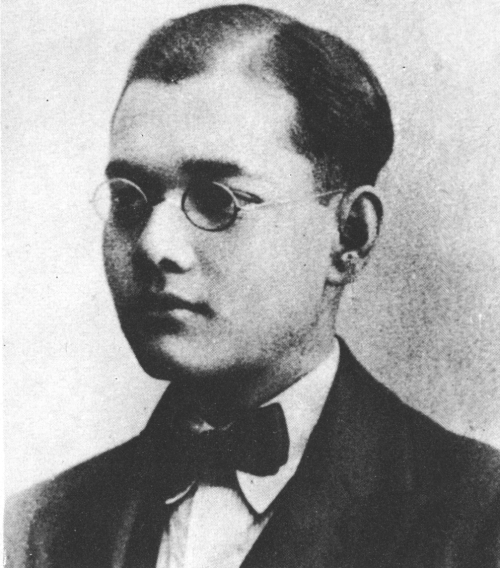
Young Subhash Chandra Bose

=== Subhas Chandra Bose (Netaji) ===
After the capture of Mohan Singh, the Japanese forces enlisted the help of Netaji Subhas Chandra Bose to revive and lead the INA. Bose was already very well known amongst the Indian Diaspora communities for his efforts to fight for India's independence and his disagreements with Gandhi's ideologies about fighting for independence. As such, Bose was able to rally the INA forces together . He was also able to convince many of the Indian civilians to contribute to the cause of the INA. Bose also encouraged women to partake in activities of the INA, setting up the first women's unit, the Rani of Jhansi Regiment in October 1943. Bose was also more successful in negotiations with the Japanese to provide support for the Indian troops. This was largely because Bose was more successful than Singh in the military operations that he organized. The success of the troops also forced the Japanese to take the INA more seriously.

However towards the end of the Japanese occupation, even Bose could not salvage the falling morale in the INA despite his best efforts. In the midst of quelling various mutinies that had emerged in various INA camps during August 1945, Bose received information that the Japanese were surrendering. On 15 August 1945, Bose declared the end of the INA through a radio broadcast made in Singapore. Three days later, he perished in an airplane crash.

== Decline of the INA ==
While earlier academics have often attributed the fall of the INA to prevailing socio-economic conditions during the war or the inefficiency of the Japanese forces, more recent literature which have focused on perspectives from the soldiers themselves, suggests that a multitude of factors contributed to the decline of the INA.

=== Loss of motivation ===
Towards the end of the Japanese occupation around December 1943, the prevailing socioeconomic conditions for the Indians were quickly going downhill. There was a severe food shortage due to the Japanese losing their footing and influence in many parts of the Southeast Asian region .

The poor economic conditions faced by the Indians contributed to the low morale in the ranks of the INA. To further complicate matters, news of the 1944 Imphal disaster had made its rounds amongst the INA troops as well, contributing to their sense of hopelessness. Many of the INA soldiers had also begun to believes that the Japanese would soon be defeated by the allied forces. As such, they were reluctant to obey instructions to serve the Japanese forces. During this period, the number of civilians who volunteered to be part of the INA declined greatly as well. In December 1944, only a mere 560 civilians became part of the INA. At that point “there were already 2000 deserters at large in Malaya, and 200 men were disappearing from training camps every month”.

The existing INA troops’ unhappiness was further compounded by the news that the 3rd Division of the INA [composed chiefly of local volunteers in Malaya and Singapore] was not going to be allowed to go to Burma to fight for India's independence. Instead, they were tasked to protect the Japanese bases in Singapore and Malaya. In particular the Japanese forces wanted to use the 3rd division to quell the uprising from the Malayan People's Anti-Japanese Army (MPAJA), formed in 1944 and was made up of local Chinese and members of the Malayan Communist Party (MCP). Many INA soldiers chose to defect from the INA as they did not wish to fight the locals for the Japanese forces who had broken their promises of aiding them to fight for the independence of India from the British. Some of those who defected, quickly aligned themselves and forged alliances with MPAJA, as they now felt that there was “no hope of liberating India, the alternative of liberating Malaya begun to seem far more attractive”.

Simultaneously, there was a more rapid dissolution of the INA occurring in Burma. By the middle of June 1945, when Subash Chandra Bose returned to Singapore, he focused on revitalizing the disintegrating INA movement. He engaged in various propaganda measures, most notably, he called for the construction of a memorial in remembrance of the Indian soldiers who died for the INA's cause. However, despite his best efforts, it would appear that there was very little left of the INA to salvage. By that time, many of the INA soldiers were deeply influenced by communist ideologies and were contributing aid and rations to the guerilla forces. This decline in morale and the rise of dissatisfaction amongst the INA soldiers reached its peak in early August, when a riot erupted in one of the INA training camps. This was later believed to have been because the senior “Indian army officers [in that camp] had rebelled in the hopes that they would be better placed when the British forces arrived”.

=== Acceptance of Defeat ===
In August 1945, Bose was informed of the Japanese's decision to surrender. This marked the end of the INA and its activities. On 15 August 1945, Bose partook in a final radio broadcast in Singapore. He praised and thanked the Indians in East Asia for their huge scarifies. In his speech, he asserted that:

“A glorious chapter in the History of India's struggle for Freedom has come to a close and, in that chapter, the sons and daughters of India in East Asia will have an undying place.…You sent an unending stream of your sons and daughters to the camps to be trained as soldiers of the Azad Hind Fauj and of the Rani of Jhansi Regiment. Money and materials, you poured lavishly…. Posterity will bless your name, and will talk with pride about your offerings at the altar of India's freedom.…Do not be depressed at our temporary failure.… There is no power on earth that can keep India enslaved. India shall be free and before long.”

=== Aftermath of the Japanese Occupation in Singapore ===
Following the end of the Japanese occupation, the INA were viewed with great pride and reverence in India as stories of their struggle for India's independence spread quickly. However, the same could not be said for the former INA members in diasporic Singapore. In Singapore, Indians particularly the ones who were associated with the INA were treated with disdain as they were “stigmatized as fascists and Japanese collaborators”. However, many of the members of the British re-occupation forces were made up of Indian soldiers and this at the very least offered some amount of physical protection for many of the Indians living in Singapore.

Many of the ex-INA soldiers had by then switched loyalties back towards the British. When the British arrived on 5 September 1945 Shinozaki notes that the Gurkhas ... [upon seeing] the INA's memorial tower ... began to knock it down. Many Indians nearby ... clapped their hands at this. I thought to myself, these same people were before in the INA’. With the return of the British, many Indians were afraid that they would become a target because of their connections to the INA and IIL. Largely due to the poor fortunes that they had experienced towards the end of the British colonial rule, many of the educated Indians desired to gain employment within the British administration. As such they pledged (correctly or incorrectly) that they had stayed loyal to the British during the Japanese occupation and had only joined the INA when left with no choice. Some others chose to turn other members of the INA and IIL over to the British force in order to gain favour with the British administration.

== Long-term significance of the Indian National Army ==
Despite being dissolved in August 1945, the INA and its legacy continued to have far reaching consequences in India such as influencing the new Indian Army, altering British policy towards the Indian forces and also playing a major role in shaping the political outcome following India's independence.

=== Effects on the Indian Army (after 1945) ===
The INA had left deep impressions on many of the existing British-Indian soldiers, many of them who had been recruited during the war. Their encounters with members of the INA and the secret circulation of past INA propaganda had a lasting impression of the British-Indian soldiers. One British officer observed: "In the eleven months which had ... elapsed since the first contacts of the Indian Army, Navy and Air Force with the mass of the I.N.A. in Rangoon, there had been widespread fraternization. Its result was political consciousness which the Indian Servicemen had never before possessed." This new consciousness led them to react more sharply not only to the existing grievances in the Service but to the pressing political issues of the post-war years.

Coupled with the glorification of the INA by various political parties, the morale of the members of the British-Indian troops began to decline and signs of rebellion began to emerge. During the first INA trial, in November 1945, the Royal Indian Air Force went on a strike to protest against the trials and in February 1946, the Royal Indian Navy also joined the mutiny with some areas where the RIN was stationed, experiencing bursts of violence. It was evident by the middle of 1946 that much of the Indian Armed Forces were INA sympathizers.

=== Changes by the British colonial administration ===
The British administration was able to gather some important lessons from the revolt of the British-Indian officers to form the INA. Prior to World War II, the British had been certain that certain “martial races” would be forever loyal to the British. However, this confidence was shaken after the events of World War II. During the INA trials which occurred shortly after the surrender of the Japanese, the British forces uncovered that this “martial races” had felt discriminated by the British government in terms “pay, allowance and promotions”. This was said to be one of the biggest motivations for the revolt. This “was a lesson for the colonial powers”. In fact, some authors have argued that these realizations greatly shaped the policy of the British towards the Indian forces in the next few years before India achieved independence in 1947. The British resorted to treating the Indian soldiers with more suspicion but ensured greater equality to prevent such an occurrence again.

=== Contributions to the Indian nationalist movements ===
Some academics believe that the INA acted as a catalyst for the |India independence movement as it sped up the end of British rule in India. The INA and its legacy continued to aid the Indian Nationalist movements and brought together various groups of people who were previously in conflict with each other. This was especially so after the trials of some of the INA officers between 1945 and 1946. The trials were said to have “created a widespread revolutionary anti-British sentiment in India. A consensus of opinion arose among almost all the political parties in India which condemned the Government's policy of trying certain I.N.A. officers by court martial.”. The Muslim League, Hindu religious groups such as the Mahasabha and Akali Dal, and the Socialist leaders all came together to lend their support to the INA soldiers. In fact, the Indian National Congress was able to gain popularity amongst the general Indian population by choosing to side with the INA officers despite their varying religious faiths, thus establishing itself as a secular political party which could represent the interest of all groups of Indians. This would eventually play an important role in the Indian National Congress winning the first general elections in 1947, following the departure of the British.

== Memory of the INA in Singapore History ==
=== Monuments and important places ===
Farrer Park Field adjacent to Little India, Cathay Building where Subhas Chandra proclaimed an independent India, Padang former INA sepoy lines ground and adjacent Former Indian National Army Monument at Esplanade Park are the important sites related to INA. All of these lie, from north to south along a 4 km route, within the Central Business District (CBD). The supreme command of the INA was set up at Mount Pleasant and the PoW headquarters with the largest PoW camp was set up at Neesoon (Yishun) under General M. Z. Kiani. Other smaller PoW camps housing Indian troops were set up at Bidadari, Tyersall, Buller (Queenstown), Seletar and Kranji.

Farrer Park Field, where Japanese held the alliance building meeting in February 1942 with native Indian Prisoners of War of British Indian Army which led to the eventual formation of the INA in the same month, is an important site. In 1942, following the Japanese takeover of Singapore, soldiers from the British Indian Army were rounded up at Farrer Park Field to urge them to switch allegiance to the Japanese. This event is now known as the Farrer Park address.

Padang (literally "the field" in Malay language), where Subhas Chandra Bose addressed the INA soldiers several times. On 9 July 1943 he mobilised the resources for the independence of India with the inspiring words, "Time has come for three million Indians living in East Asia to mobilise all their available resources including money and manpower. Half-hearted measures will not do. …Out of this total mobilisation I expect at least three hundred thousand soldiers and three crores that is thirty million dollars." On 5 August 1943 in another address at Padang he inspired, and received overwhelming response, when he questioned the soldiers if they felt "Jai Hind" (Victory for India) and "Chalo Dhili" (Lets march on Delhi) slogans were essential part of their spirit. This field is now a gazetted national monument of Singapore, and also houses Singapore Cricket Club Ground where the first One Day International cricket match was held during the 1995–96 Singer Cup - a triangular series involving India, Pakistan and Sri Lanka.

Cathay Building is an important site in the history of the independence of India, it is where Subhas Chandra Bose proclaimed the Free India and formed the first independent government of pre-partition united India on 21 October 1943 (see also Greater India and Akhand Bharat).

Former Indian National Army Monument, built during Japanese occupation of Singapore during World War II, was demolished by the British colonial administration after the defeat of Japanese in the war, and a new plaque monument stands there now. This plaque was erected by the National Heritage Board, with financial donations from the Indian community in Singapore, to commemorate the 50th anniversary of World War II.

Tyersall Park which housed British Indian Army hospital which was bombed by the Japanese forces prior to their invasion of Singapore. After the invasion, it served as one of seven POW camps for interned Indian Army personnel who later became part of INA in Singapore under Lieutenant Colonel Gurbaksh Singh (not to be confused with INA General Gurbaksh Singh Dhillon) of the Jind State force, comprising jats and other troops mainly from Haryana and Punjab.

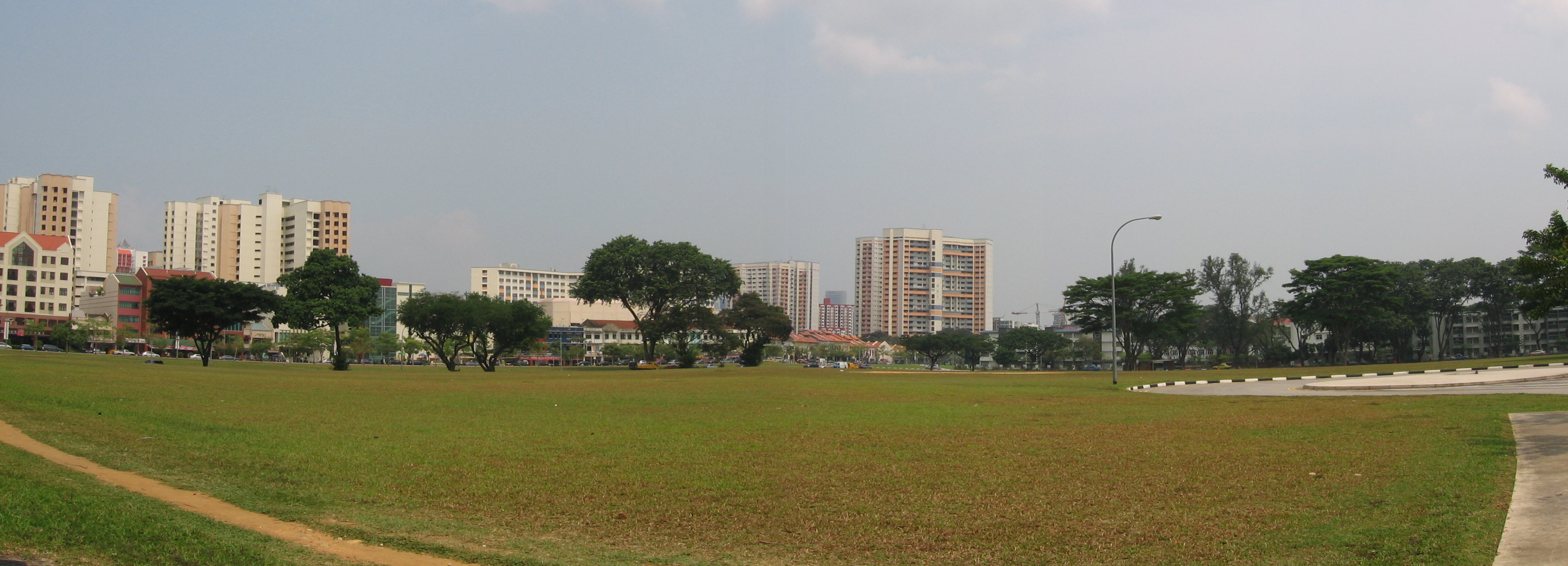
Farrer Park Field where British Indian POWs were persuaded in February 1942 to switch loyalty to Japan to gain Indian independence.

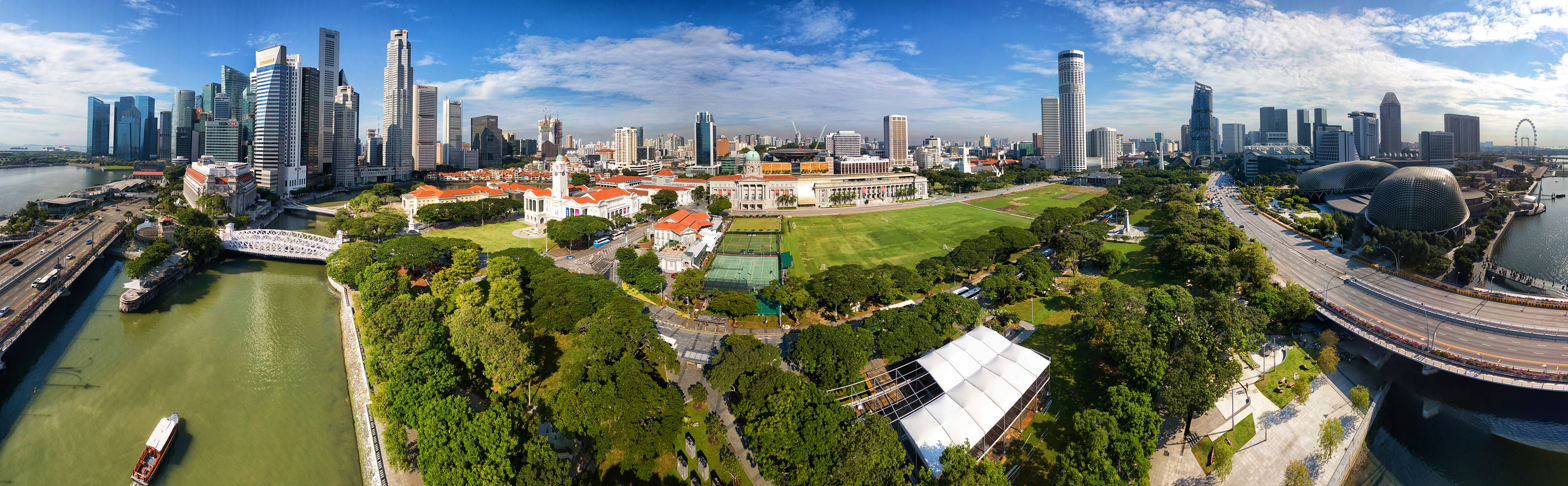
Aerial panorama of Singapore's Downtown Core with Padang at right, where Subash Chandra Bose addressed INA soldiers several times when it was used as the sepoy lines (cantonment area).

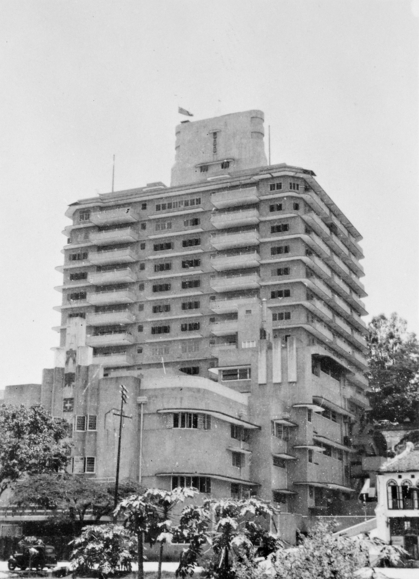
The Cathay Cinema Building in Singapore as it looked when Subash Chandra Bose made proclamation of the Free India in 1943, picture c. 1945.

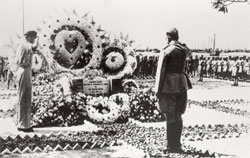
Bose lays the foundation of the INA Memorial at Esplanade Park on 8 July 1945.

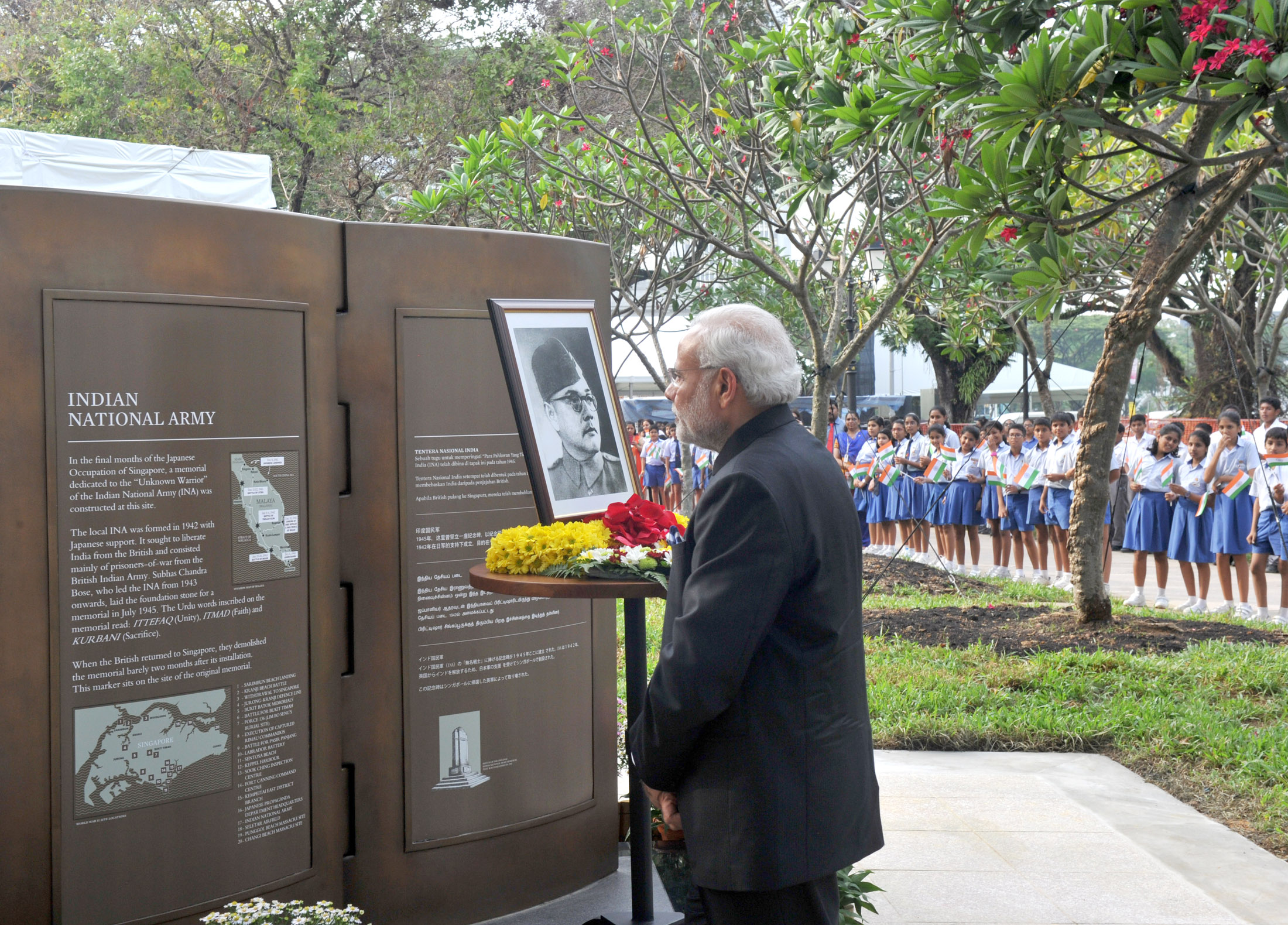
The Prime Minister of India, Narendra Modi paying homage to INA martyrs on 24 November 2015 at the present-day plaque which marks the site of former INA Memorial.

=== Deliberate lack of prominence in Singapore Government's official narrative ===
Asad Latif has documented Singapore's INA connection in his book "India in the making of Singapore". National Archives of Singapore and National Heritage Board of Singapore are involved in the preservation of research material and heritage sites in Singapore related to the INA.

Many scholars have claimed the INA's story, is an integral part of the history of Indians in Singapore. There has been little focus on the INA in the post-independence historical narrative of Singapore. The INA is only very briefly mentioned as an anti-colonial force in much of Singapore's post-independence historical narrative. The Singapore government often chooses not to allow war commemorations to be along ethnic lines. These accounts often omit the information of the INA soldiers fighting for the Japanese forces, under whom the Chinese population had endured great hardship.

One explanation is that In the early formation years of Singapore, the government “found themselves in a state without a nation” and at that moment they took advantage of the common suffering that the people had endured during the Japanese occupation and attempted to turn it into one of the cornerstones of nation building in Singapore. As such, in order to play up the suffering as a common thread and collective memory, the Singapore government had left out the part of history where the Indians in Singapore had joined hands with the Japanese. Instead, they proceeded to highlight that people living in Singapore from all walks of life had suffered extensively at the hands of the Japanese. Consequently, that feeling of mutual suffering contributed to them being and feeling Singaporean. This exclusion about details of the INA from the historical narrative helped to create a sense of identity and unity in a rather fragmented society at that time.

== See also ==
- INA related context
  - 1915 Singapore Mutiny
  - Bidadari Resolutions
  - First Indian National Army
  - Royal Indian Navy mutiny
  - Royal Air Force mutiny
  - History of Singapore
- General context
  - 1915 Singapore Mutiny
  - Greater India
  - History of Indian influence on Southeast Asia
  - History of Singaporean Indians
  - Hinduism in Southeast Asia
  - Non-resident Indian and Overseas Citizen of India
  - Indianisation
  - Indian Singaporeans
  - List of Hindu temples in Singapore
  - List of Indian organisations in Singapore

== Notes ==
- Marston, Daniel (2014), The Indian Army and End of the Raj, Cambridge University Press, ISBN 978-0-521-89975-8
- Fay, Peter W. (1993), The Forgotten Army: India's Armed Struggle for Independence, 1942-1945., Ann Arbor, University of Michigan Press., ISBN 0-472-08342-2
- Sarkar, Sumit (1983), Modern India, 1885–1947, Macmillan, ISBN 978-0-333-90425-1
- Singh, Harkirat (2003), INA Trials and the Raj, Atlantic Publishers, ISBN 81-269-0316-3
