= Sri Srinivasa Perumal Temple =

Hindu temple in Singapore

- ஸ்ரீ ஸ்ரீநிவாசப்பெருமாள் கோவில் 斯里尼瓦沙柏鲁马兴都庙; Sīlǐníwǎshā Bòlǔmǎ Xīngdūmiào
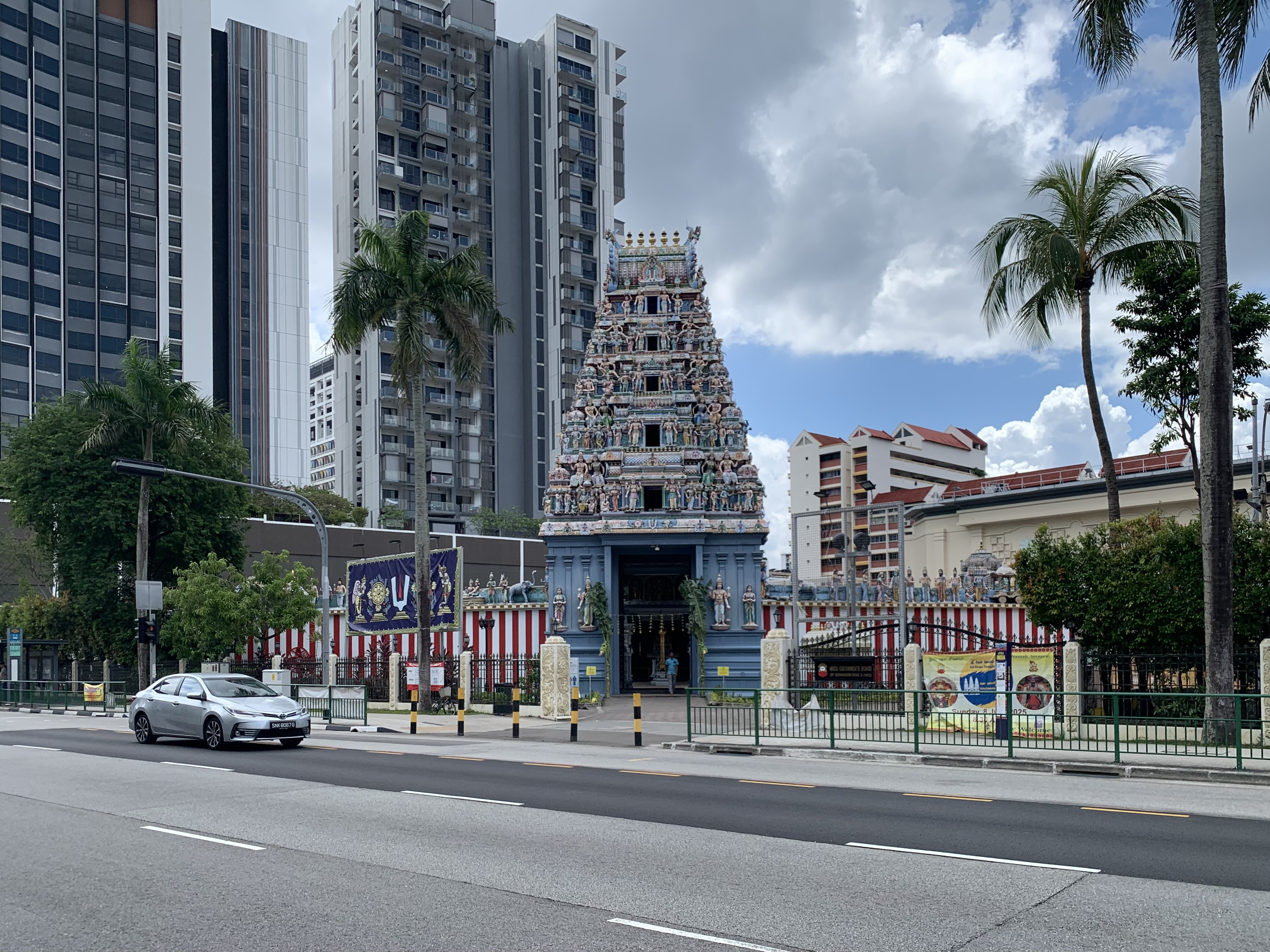
- The temple with its gopuram

- Location in Singapore

Religion
- Affiliation: Hinduism
- Deity: Venkateswara

Location
- Location: 397 Serangoon Road, Singapore 218123
- Country: Singapore
- Coordinates: 1°18′47.8″N 103°51′22.3″E

Architecture
- Type: Dravidian architecture
- Creator: P. Govindasamy Pillai
- Completed: 1855; 171 years ago
- National monument of Singapore
- Designated: 10 November 1978; 47 years ago
- Reference no.: 17

Website
- Sri Srinivasa Perumal Temple

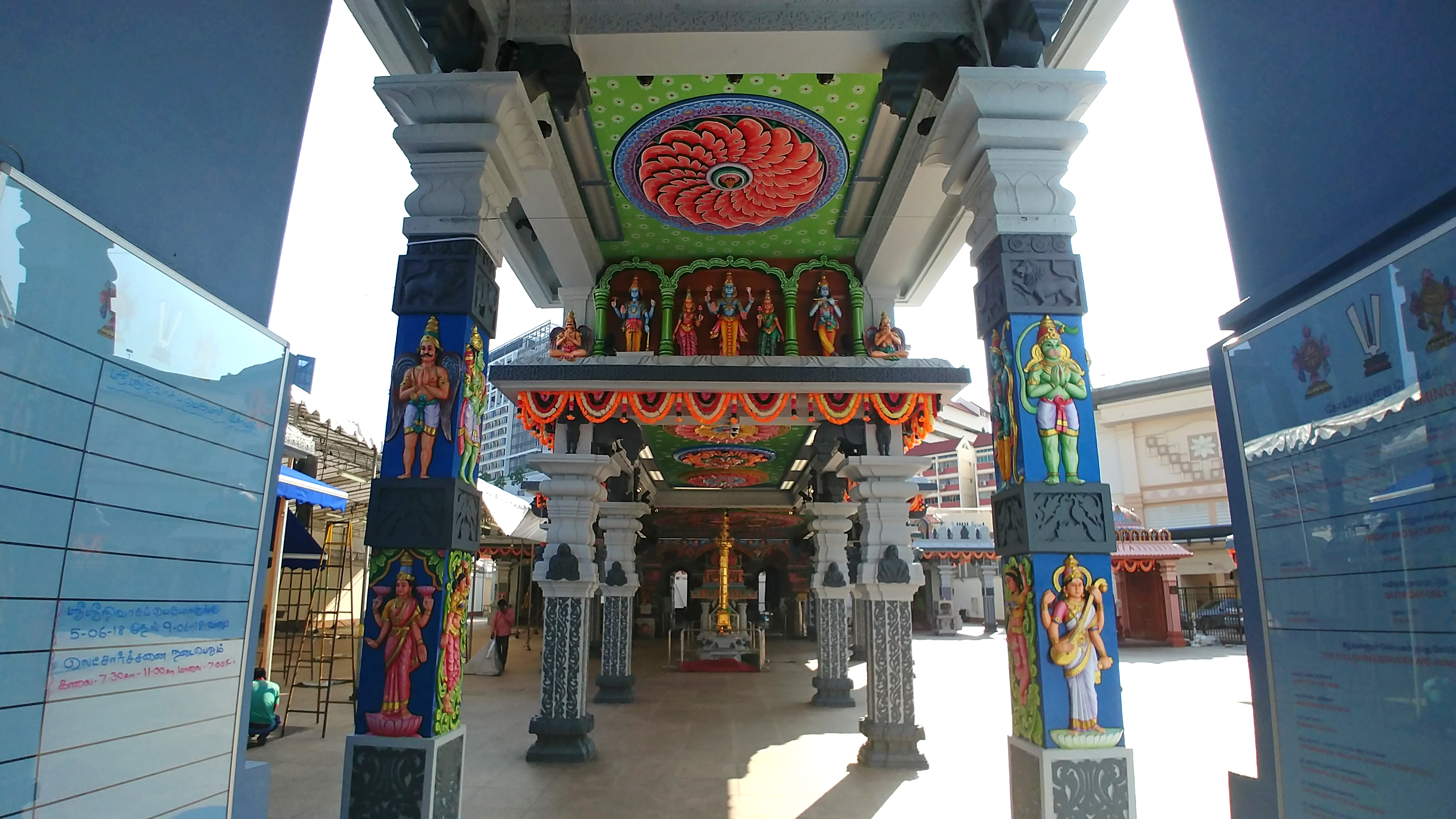
Main entrance hallway of Sri Srinivasa Temple.

Sri Srinivasa Perumal Temple or Sri Perumal Temple (Tamil: சிங்கப்பூர் ஸ்ரீநிவாசப் பெருமாள் கோயில்) is one of the oldest temples in Singapore. It was built by the early Indian settlers who were of Tamil Speaking. It is located in Little India within the planning area of Kallang along Serangoon Road, where its tall Gopuram (tower) shows the different incarnations of Lord Vishnu. This large complex, dedicated to Vishnu, dates from 1855, but the 20-metres-tall Gopuram was only built in 1966 at a cost of S$300,000. The temple's five-tier Gopuram was a donation from P. Govindasamy Pillai, one of the earliest Indian migrants to Singapore. In 1978, the temple was gazetted as a National monument of Singapore.

== History ==
In 1851, the temple's land was purchased from the East India Company and finished construction in 1855. It was initially known as Sri Narasimha Perumal Temple.

A wedding hall was constructed and was officially opened on 19 June 1965 by the first president of Singapore, Yusof Ishak.

In the period that followed, on the advice of elders, the temple's main deity was changed from Narasimha Perumal to Srinivasa Perumal and the temple was renamed as Sri Srinivasa Perumal Temple.

On 10 November 1978, the temple was gazetted as a national monument of Singapore.

== Architecture ==
The area around the Perumal Temple was once filled with ponds and vegetable gardens. A stream used to lead into the temple and was an important source for devotees to ritually cleanse themselves before beginning worship. Inside the temple's inner courtyard, a well marks the spot where the stream used to flow. There is also a Tulasi (basil) plant, the Hindus' symbolic holy bush.

Inside the temple, you will find a statue of Perumal, or Vishnu, his consorts Lakshmi and Andal, and his bird-mount, Garuda. Perumal Temple is at the centre of the Hindu trinity made up of Brahma the creator, Vishnu the preserver, and Shiva the destroyer. The temple is dedicated to Krishna, one of the incarnations of Vishnu. Perumal is another name for Krishna and statues of him - coloured blue to signify blue-blood - are everywhere in the temple. There are also statues, Lakshmi and Andal, the goddesses of wealth and beauty respectively, and of his mount, the mythical Garuda bird. The temple ceiling is dominated by a colourful circular pattern depicting the nine planets of the universe.

There are separate sanctums for Chakrathaazhvar and Lord Hanuman.

This temple is the starting point for devotees during the annual Thaipusam festival. Devotees, their tongues and cheeks pierced by great metal skewers supporting kavadi (cage-like constructions decorated with wire and peacock feathers), make their way to the Chettiar Hindu Temple on Tank Road in this colourful procession. This is done in gratitude or supplication to Lord Murugan.

== Access ==
The temple is accessed within walking distance of Farrer Park MRT station on the North East line.
