= Manjalamkuzhi Ali =

Indian politician, film producer, distributor, actor and former minister

- മഞ്ഞളാംകുഴി അലി

Member of the Kerala Legislative Assembly
- Incumbent
- Assumed office 2021
- Preceded by: T. A. Ahmed Kabir
- Constituency: Mankada
- In office 2016–2021
- Succeeded by: Najeeb Kanthapuram
- Constituency: Perinthalmanna
- In office 2011–2016
- Preceded by: V. Sasikumar
- Constituency: Perinthalmanna
- In office 2006–2011
- Succeeded by: T. A. Ahmed Kabir
- Constituency: Mankada
- In office 2001–2006
- Preceded by: K. P. A. Majeed
- Constituency: Mankada

Minister for Urban Affairs and Minority Affairs, Government of Kerala
- In office 18 May 2011 – 24 May 2016
- Chief Minister: Oommen Chandy
- Preceded by: Paloli Mohammed Kutty (Minister for Local Self Government and Minority Welfare)
- Succeeded by: A. C. Moideen (Minister for Local Self Government); K.T. Jaleel (Minister for Minority Welfare)
- Constituency: Perinthalmanna

Personal details
- Born: 1 January 1952 (age 74) Panangangara, Malappuram
- Party: Indian Union Muslim League (2010-present)
- Spouse: APM Raziyaa
- Children: Amjad Ali (1981 - 2014), Aysha Mishal, Ameena Ali, Mohammed Arif
- Occupation: Politician, businessman

Manjalamkuzhi Ali (born 1 January 1952) is an Indian politician, film producer, distributor, actor and former minister in the Government of Kerala. He also worked in Malayalam cinema. He is the member of Kerala Legislative Assembly from Mankada constituency, since May 2021.

An entrepreneur-turned-politician, Ali left the LDF and joined Indian Union Muslim League on the eve of the 2011 Kerala Legislative Assembly election. He was elected as an MLA from the Perinthalmanna constituency in Malappuram district for two terms, in 2011 and 2016. In the previous two elections held in 2001 and 2006, he was elected to the assembly from Mankada as an LDF independent. He is a leader of Indian Union Muslim League.

== Biography ==
Manjalamkuzhi Ali, was born on 1 January 1952, as the 5th child of 10 to Manjalamkuzhi Mohammed Alias Manu and Perincheeri Kunhaysha.

He is married to APM Raziya, daughter of late C P Kunjalikutty Keyi (Ex MLA). He is the chairman of the GEMS Arts and Science college, Ramapuram, Malappuram district. He is the producer of some Malayalam movies, including The King.

He was Chairman of Mahakavi Moyinkutty Vaidyar Smaraka Trust from 1996 to 2001, director of KSFDC from 1996 to 2001 and director of Department of Non-Resident Keralites Affairs from 2006 to 2011. He acted in films including 'Vikruthikootam'.

His elder son Amjad Ali died on 12 March 2014 at the age of 33 in Dubai due to heart attack.

== Movies ==
Title	Notes
Dhwani	Karumanchery Production
Purappadu	Karumanchery Production
Radha Madhavam	Karumanchery Production
Oru Abhibhashakante Case Diary	Quality International
The King	Quality International
The Good Boys	Quality International
Amaram	Distribution
Ezharakkoottam	Quality International
Aayirappara	Tony John
Mahanagaram	Distribution
Soorya Manasam	Distribution
