= Ram Mandir (disambiguation) =

Ram Mandir is a temple at Ram Janmabhoomi in Ayodhya, India.

Ram(a) Mandir ("temple of Rama") or Ram(a) Temple may also refer to:

- Ram Mandir, Bhubaneswar, Bhubaneswar, India
- Ram Mandir railway station Mumbai, India; named after a local temple
- Shree Ram Mandir, Mayur Vihar, Delhi, India
- Shree Rama Temple, Triprayar, Kerala, India
- Sree Ramar Temple, Singapore
- Sri Rama Temple, Ramapuram, Kerala, India
- Thiruvangad Sree Ramaswami Temple, Kerala, India
- Viraat Ramayan Mandir or Ram Mandir, East Champaran district, Bihar, India
