= Mankada Assembly constituency =

Constituency of the Kerala legislative assembly in India

Mankada
- Constituency No. 39 for the Kerala Legislative Assembly
- Angadipuram railway station in Mankada Assembly constituency

Constituency details
- Country: India
- Region: South India
- State: Kerala
- District: Malappuram
- Established: 1957
- Total electors: 2,18,774 (2021)
- Reservation: None

Member of Legislative Assembly
- 16th Kerala Legislative Assembly
- Incumbent Manjalamkuzhi Ali
- Party: IUML
- Alliance: UDF
- Elected year: 2026

Mankada State assembly constituency is one of the 140 state legislative assembly constituencies in Kerala in southern India. It is also one of the seven state legislative assembly constituencies included in Malappuram Lok Sabha constituency. As of the 2026 Assembly elections, the current MLA is Manjalamkuzhi Ali of IUML.

== Local self-governed segments ==
Mankada Assembly constituency is composed of the following local self-governed segments:

Sl no.	Name	Status (Grama panchayat/Municipality)	Taluk
1	Mankada	Grama panchayat	Perinthalmanna
2	Koottilangadi	Grama panchayat	Perinthalmanna
3	Makkaraparamba	Grama panchayat	Perinthalmanna
4	Kuruva	Grama panchayat	Perinthalmanna
5	Puzhakkattiri	Grama panchayat	Perinthalmanna
6	Angadippuram	Grama panchayat	Perinthalmanna
7	Moorkanad	Grama panchayat	Perinthalmanna

Mankada Assembly constituency

== Members of Legislative Assembly ==
The following list contains all members of Kerala Legislative Assembly who have represented Mankada Assembly constituency during the period of various assemblies:

Election	Niyama Sabha	Name	Party	Tenure
1957	1st	Mohammad Kodur Valia Peedikakkal	Indian Union Muslim League	1957–1960
1960	2nd	P. Abdul Majeed	Indian Union Muslim League	1960–1965
1967	3rd	C. H. Mohammed Koya	Indian Union Muslim League	1967–1970
1970	4th	M. Moideen Kutty	Indian Union Muslim League	1970–1977
1977	5th	Korambayil Ahammed Haji	Indian Union Muslim League	1977–1980
1980	6th	K. P. A. Majeed	Indian Union Muslim League	1980–1982
1982	7th	K. P. A. Majeed	Indian Union Muslim League	1982–1987
1987	8th	K. P. A. Majeed	Indian Union Muslim League	1987–1991
1991	9th	K. P. A. Majeed	Indian Union Muslim League	1991–1996
1996	10th	K. P. A. Majeed	Indian Union Muslim League	1996–2001
2001	11th	Manjalamkuzhi Ali	Left Democratic Front	2001–2006
2006	12th	Manjalamkuzhi Ali	Left Democratic Front	2006–2011
2011	13th	T. A. Ahmed Kabir	Indian Union Muslim League	2011–2016
2016	14th	T. A. Ahmed Kabir	Indian Union Muslim League	2016-2021
2021	15th	Manjalamkuzhi Ali	Indian Union Muslim League	2021-2026
2026	16th	Manjalamkuzhi Ali	Indian Union Muslim League	2026-

== Election results ==
Percentage change (±%) denotes the change in the number of votes from the immediate previous election.

=== 2026 ===
2026 Kerala Legislative Assembly election: Mankada
Party	Candidate	Votes	%	±%
IUML	Manjalamkuzhi Ali	110,692		
LDF	Kunnath Muhammed	65,083		
BJP	Lijoy Paul	9,933		
NOTA	None of the above	1,315		
Independent	Mohammed Kunnath	663		
Margin of victory		45,609		
Turnout		1,87,686		
IUML hold		Swing		

=== 2021 ===
There were 2,18,774 registered voters in the constituency for the 2021 Kerala Assembly election.

2021 Kerala Legislative Assembly election: Mankada
Party	Candidate	Votes	%	±%
IUML	Manjalamkuzhi Ali	83,231	49.46%	▲3.38
CPI(M)	T. K. Rasheedali	76,985	45.75%	▲0.68
BJP	Sajesh Elayil	6,641	3.95%	▼0.47
NOTA	None of the above	599	0.36%	▲0.04
Independent	Ali S/o Musthafa	350	0.21%	N/A
Independent	Ali S/o Alavi Haji	193	0.11%	N/A
Independent	Rasheedali S/o Mammunni	183	0.11%	N/A
Independent	M. Ali	86	0.05%	N/A
Margin of victory		6,246	3.71%	▲2.70
Turnout		1,68,268	76.91%	▼0.26
IUML hold		Swing	▲3.38	

=== 2016 ===
There were 1,94,496 registered voters in Mankada Assembly constituency for the 2016 Kerala Assembly election.

2016 Kerala Legislative Assembly election: Mankada
Party	Candidate	Votes	%	±%
IUML	T. A. Ahmed Kabir	69,165	46.08%	▼9.80
CPI(M)	Adv. T. K. Rasheed Ali	67,657	45.07%	▲8.65
BJP	B. Ratheesh	6,641	4.42%	▲0.80
WPOI	Hameed Vaniyambalam	3,999	2.66%	−
SDPI	A. A. Raheem	1,456	0.97%	▼1.52
NOTA	None of the above	479	0.32%	−
PDP	O. T. Shihab	273	0.18%	−
Independent	Ahamed Kabeer Muttengadan	218	0.15%	−
Margin of victory		1,508	1.01%	▼18.45
Turnout		1,50,099	77.17%	▲3.27
IUML hold		Swing	▼9.80	

=== 2011 ===
There were 1,64,067 registered voters in the constituency for the 2011 election.

2011 Kerala Legislative Assembly election: Mankada
Party	Candidate	Votes	%	±%
IUML	T. A. Ahmed Kabir	67,756	55.88%	
CPI(M)	Kadeeja Sathar	44,163	36.42%	
BJP	Manikandan K.	4,387	3.62%	
SDPI	C. H. Ashraf	3,015	2.49%	
Independent	Anwar Babu	1,926	1.59%	
Margin of victory		23,593	19.46%	
Turnout		1,21,247	73.90%	
IUML hold		Swing		

== See also ==
- Mankada
- Malappuram district
- List of constituencies of the Kerala Legislative Assembly
- 2016 Kerala Legislative Assembly election
