= List of Hindu temples in Singapore =

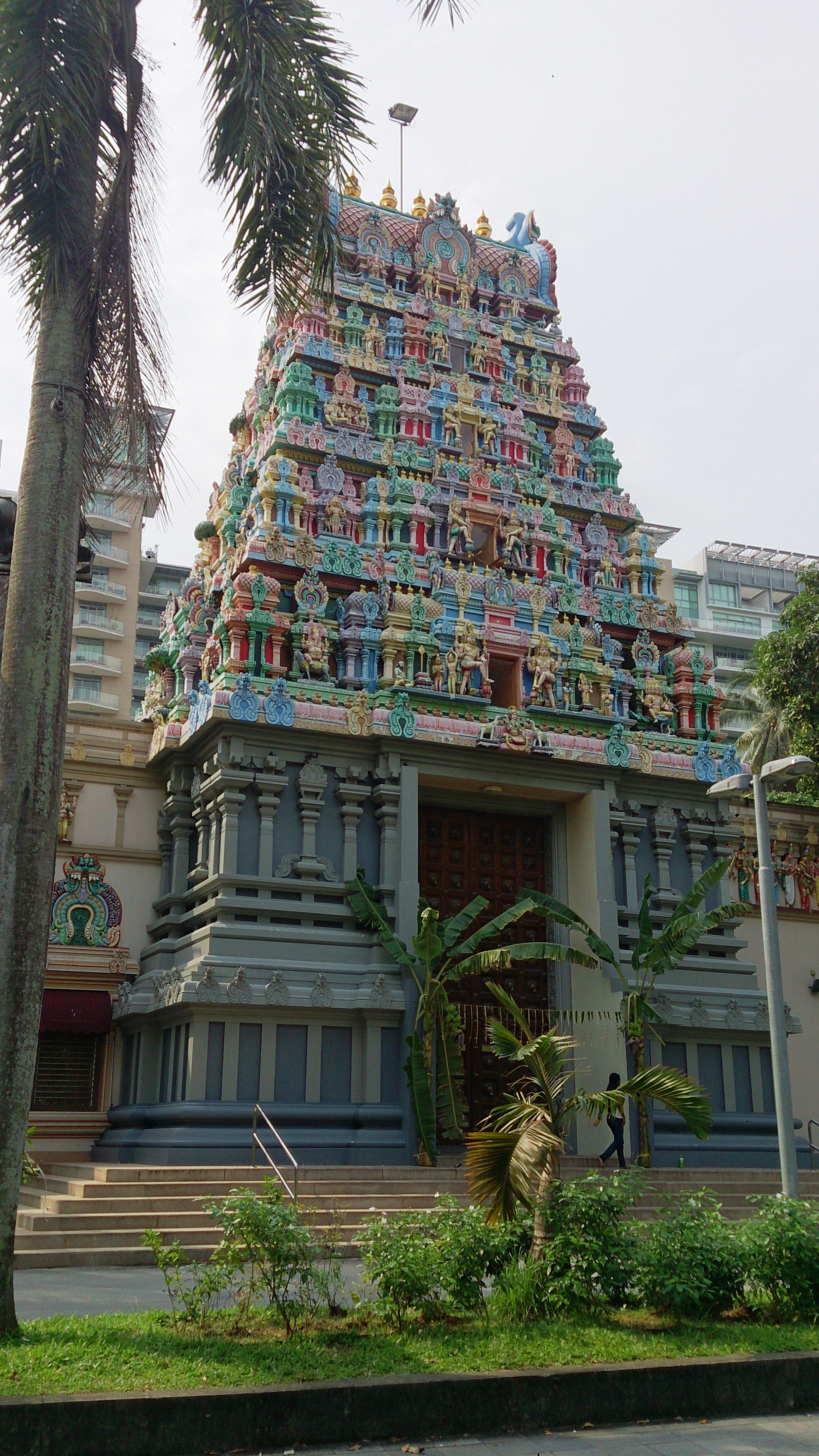
Sri Thendayuthapani Temple, at Tank Road

This is a list of Hindu temples in Singapore. A characteristic of most temples is the presence of murtis (or statues) of the Hindu deity to whom the temple is dedicated. They are usually dedicated to a single presiding deity, and other deities associated with the main deity. Exceptionally, some temples are dedicated to several deities, and others are dedicated to murtis in an aniconic form.

The following temple list is classified according to the main deity of the temple.

== Ganesha / Vinayagar temples ==
- Loyang Tua Pek Kong Vinayagar Temple, 20, Loyang Way, Singapore 508774
- Sri Layan Sithi Vinayagar Temple, 78 Keong Saik Road, Singapore 089167
- Sri Senpaga Vinayagar Temple, 19 Ceylon Road, Singapore 429613

== Muneeswarar temples ==
- Sri Darma Muneeswaran Temple, 17 Serangoon North Avenue 1, Singapore 555894
- Sri Muneeswarar Temple, 3 Commonwealth Dr, Singapore 149594
- Sri Veeramuthu Muneswarar Temple, 523, Yishun Industrial Park A, Singapore 768770
- Sri Muneeswarar Peetam, 16 Ubi Road 4, Singapore 408624

== Murugan temples ==
- Arulmigu Velmurugan Gnana Muneeswaran Temple, 50 Rivervale Cres Sengkang, Singapore 545029
- Sri Arulmigu Murugan Temple, Jurong East St 21, Singapore 609605
- Sri Holy Tree Balasubramaniam Temple, 10 Yishun Industrial Park A, Singapore 768772
- Sri Murugan Hill Temple, 931 Upper Bukit Timah Rd, 678207
- Sri Thendayuthapani Temple, 15 Tank Road, Singapore 238065

== Shakti (Durga / Kali / Lakshmi / Mariamman) temples ==
- Sree Maha Mariamman Temple, 251 Yishun Avenue 3, Singapore 769061
- Sri Lakshminarayan Temple, 5 Chander Rd, Singapore 219528
- Sri Mariamman Temple, Singapore South Bridge Road (oldest temple in Singapore), National Monument
- Sri Ruthra Kaliamman Temple, 100 Depot Road, Singapore 109670
- Sri Vadapathira Kaliamman Temple, 555 Serangoon Road, Singapore 218174
- Vairavimada Kaliamman Temple, 2001 Lor 8 Toa Payoh, Singapore 319259
- Sri Veeramakaliamman Temple, 141 Serangoon Road, Singapore 218042

== Shiva temples ==
- Sri Arasakesari Sivan Temple, 25 Sungei Kadut Avenue, Singapore 729679
- Sri Manmatha Karuneshvarar Temple, 226 Kallang Road, Singapore 339096
- Sri Siva Durga Temple (formerly Sri Sivan Temple), 8 Potong Pasir Avenue 2, Singapore 358362
- Sri Siva Krishna Temple, 31 Marsiling Rise, Singapore 739127
- Sri Sivan Temple, 24 Geylang East Avenue 2, Singapore 389752

== Vishnu (Krishna/Hanuman / Perumal / Rama) temples ==
- Sree Guruvayoorappan Ayyappan Temple, Yishun Avenue 3, Singapore (Under Construction. Plot beside Sree Maha Mariamman Temple Yishun)
- Sree Ramar Temple, 51 Changi Village Road, Singapore 509908
- Sri Krishna Mandir (Hare Krishnas), 9 Lor 29 Geylang, #03-02, Singapore 388065
- Sri Krishnan Temple, 152 Waterloo Street, Singapore 187961, National Monument
- Shri Swaminarayan Mandir (BAPS), 81 Joo Chiat Road, #02-04, Singapore 427725
- Sri Srinivasa Perumal Temple, 397 Serangoon Road Singapore 218123 (the biggest and second oldest temple in Singapore), National Monument

== Other and movement's temples ==
- Geetha Ashram
- MelMaruvathur Aadhiparasakthi Vara Valipadu Mandram, 414 Racecourse Road behind Vadapathira Kaliamman Temple
- Narayana Gurukula
- Siddhartha Temple
- Sree Guru Raghavendra Mandir, 565 Serangoon Road, Singapore 218180
- Sri Ramakrishna Mission Prayer House, Bartley Road
- Sri Sai Temple, Shri Vadapathira Kaliamman Temple, 555 Serangoon Road, Singapore 218174

== See also ==
- Hinduism in Singapore

Context

- 1915 Singapore Mutiny
- Greater India
- History of Indian influence on Southeast Asia
- History of Singaporean Indians
- Indian diaspora
- Indianisation
- Indian National Army in Singapore
- Hinduism in South East Asia

Indian-origin religions and people in Singapore

- Arya Samaj in Singapore
- Hindu Endowments Board
- Jainism in Singapore
- Indian Singaporeans
- Lists of Hindu temples
- List of Indian organisations in Singapore
- Singaporean Indians
