= K. P. Noushad Ali =

Indian politician

- കെ. പി. നൗഷാദ് അലി

Member of the Kerala Legislative Assembly
- Incumbent
- Assumed office May 2026
- Preceded by: P. Nandakumar
- Constituency: Ponnani

K. P. Noushad Ali is a politician from Kerala, India. He is a member of the Kerala Legislative Assembly. He represents the Ponnani assembly constituency in 16th Kerala State Legislative Assembly. He belongs to the Indian National Congress.
