= Sri Siva Krishna Temple =

- ஸ்ரீ சிவா கிருஷ்ணா கோவில்
- Location within Singapore

Religion
- Affiliation: Hinduism
- Deity: Shiva and Krishna

Location
- Location: 31 Marsiling Rise, Singapore 739127
- Country: Singapore
- Interactive map of Sri Siva Krishna Temple
- Coordinates: 1°26′23.58″N 103°46′46.59″E

Architecture
- Type: Dravidian architecture
- Creator: Kunjukrishnan
- Completed: 1962; 64 years ago

Website
- http://www.sivakrishnatemple.org/

Sri Siva Krishna Temple (Tamil: ஸ்ரீ சிவா கிருஷ்ணா கோவில்), in Marsiling, Singapore, is a temple for the god Vishnu and Shiva who is the presiding deity. The temple also has many other deities.

== History ==
Kunjukrishnan cleared a small piece of land at 832, Sembawang Road in 1962, placed several shrines / deities and started praying. Taxi drivers congregated in the area for relaxation. After the death of Kunjukrishnan, Velayutham further cleared the area and brought in more deities. As the time passed by, the temple was named “Sri Siva-Krishna Temple”. With more and more devotees and revenue coming to the Temple, it was suggested that the surroundings be kept clean so as to give the temple a dignified look.

In 1982, the temple was shifted to the present site at Marsiling Rise. The land area is about 25000 square feet. Various committees took care of the temple from 1982 to 1987. In 1987, a new committee took charge of the temple and immediately performed the ground breaking ceremony. On 9 December 1987, "Shanku Sthapanam" ceremony was held and then actual construction of the temple followed. The first consecration ceremony of the temple took place on 1 September 1996. The second consecration ceremony of the temple took place on 23 March 2008.

== Temple deities ==
The deities of the temple include the following

- Sri Vinayagar,
- Sri Siva-Krishnar (Main Deity),
- Sri Murugan,
- Sri Durga, Sri Lakshmi and Sri Saraswathi,
- Sri Ramar, Sri Seethai and Sri Lakshmanar,
- Sri Anjaneyar,
- Sri Iyappan,
- Sri Mariamman,
- Sri Periyachi,
- Sri Idumbar,
- Sri Nagamma,
- Sri Dakshinamurthy,
- Sri Viswanathar and Visalakshi,
- Sri Nandheeswarar,
- Sri Karuppar,
- Sri Muneeswarar,
- Sri Madurai Veeran,
- Sri Bairavar,
- Sri Chandikeswarar and
- Navagrahas

== Social activities ==
The еemple complex holds activities such as social, educational and cultural activities. Many pujas and homams are performed on a scheduled basis.

Services offered by the temple include:

- Indoor services
- Outdoor services
- Kitches services
- Wedding ceremonies, etc

== See also ==
List of Hindu temples in Singapore
