= E. K. Imbichi Bava =

Indian politician

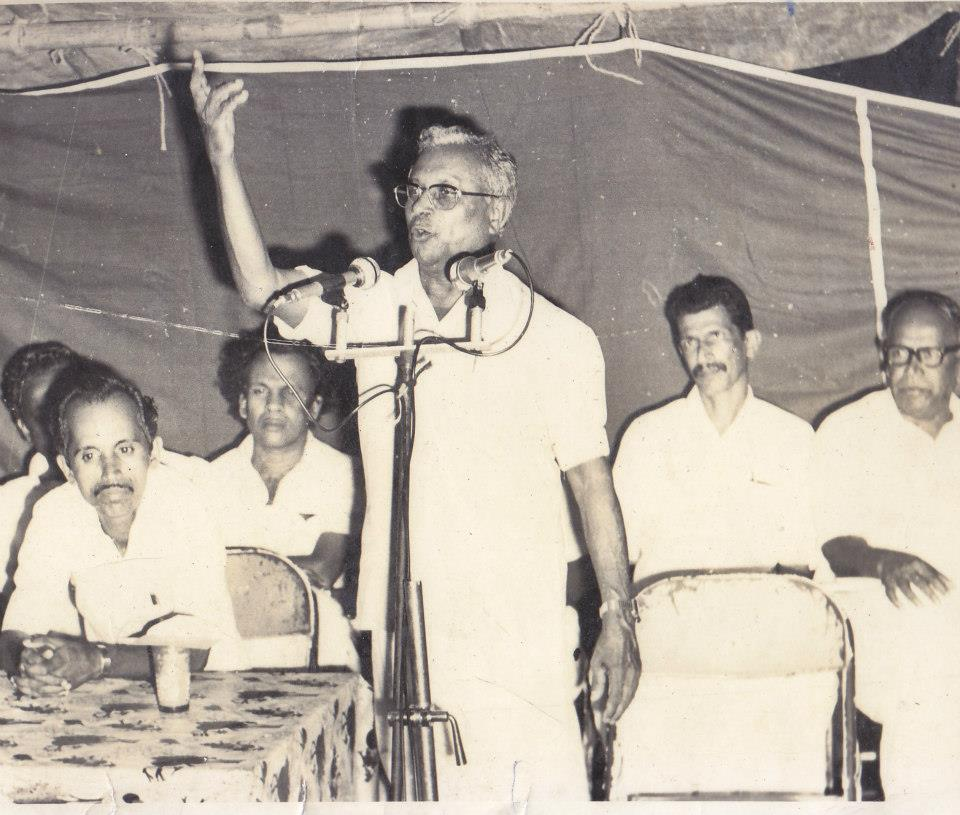
- E. K. Imbichi Bava with P. Karunakaran, A. Narayanan and T. V. Govindan

Minister for Transport & Communication, Second E.M.S. Ministry
- In office 6 March 1967 – 1 November 1969
- Preceded by: K.T. Achuthan
- Succeeded by: K. M. George

Member of Rajya Sabha for Kerala
- In office 3 April 1952 – 2 April 1954

Member of Parliament for Ponnani
- In office 1962–1967
- Preceded by: K. Kelappan
- Succeeded by: C. K. Chakrapani

Member of Parliament for Kozhikode
- In office 1980–1984
- Preceded by: V.A. Seyid Muhammad
- Succeeded by: K. G. Adiyodi

M. L. A. of Kerala Assembly for Mannarkkad
- In office 1967–1970
- Preceded by: Krishnan Kongasseri
- Succeeded by: John Manforan

M. L. A. of Kerala Assembly for Ponnani
- In office 1991–1996
- Preceded by: P. T. Mohana Krishnan
- Succeeded by: Paloli Mohammed Kutty

Personal details
- Born: 20 July 1917 Ponnani, Malappuram, Kerala
- Died: 11 April 1995 (aged 77)
- Party: Communist Party of India (Marxist)
- Spouse: Fathima
- Children: 4 sons and 1 daughter (Rasool Salam, Zeenath, Khaleel, Jaleel and Musthaqu)
- As of 18 May 2008 Source: Government of Kerala

Ezhu Kudikkal Imbichi Bava (1917–1995) was an Indian politician and a leader of the Communist Party of India (Marxist) from the municipality of Ponnani. He was member of the Rajya Sabha and the Lok Sabha, both the houses of Parliament.

== Early life ==
Bava was born on 20 July 1917 to Abdullah at Ezhukudickal in Ponnani.

== Political career ==
He began to work for public causes while still a student. Slowly attracted towards leftist thoughts, he started his political career with the Congress Socialist Party and subsequently with the Communist Party since 1940. He later became involved in the nationalist movement and played a role in establishing the "Labour Movements" and Communist Party in the state of Kerala.

He participated in the Calcutta Congress of the Communist Party of India held in 1948 representing the members from Malabar.

=== Post-independence (1947–1995) ===
He is one of the major leaders in CPI(M) in Kerala. Imbichi Bava was a member of the National Council of the Communist Party of India before it split in 1964. He was one of the founders of CPI(M). He has undergone prison terms and gone underground many times in connection with his party work. He was a member of the CPI(M) State Committee; District Secretary, CPI Palakkad, CPI(M) Malappuram;District President, CITU Malappuram; Member, All India Working Committee CITU.

He was elected to the 3rd Kerala Legislative Assembly from Mannarghat constituency as a CPI (M) candidate. He was the Minister of Transport in the ministry led by E. M. S. Namboodiripad from 6 March 1967 to 1 November 1969. After a gap, he was elected to the 9th Kerala Legislative Assembly from Ponnani constituency in 1991.

Imbichi Bava had been a Member of both the Houses of Parliament as well previously. He was a member of the Rajya Sabha from 1952 to 1954. He was elected twice to the Lok Sabha. In 1962, he was elected to the 3rd Lok Sabha from Ponnani constituency as a Communist Party of India candidate. In 1980, he was elected to the 7th Lok Sabha from Calicut constituency as a Communist Party of India (Marxist) candidate.

He died on 11 April 1995 while serving as a member of the Kerala Legislative Assembly.

The Assembly paid its homage to him on 24 April 1995.

== Personal life ==
He married Fathima Imbichi Bava (former Ponnani Municipality Chairperson, teacher and activist) and they had 4 sons and a daughter. They are Rasool Salam, his eldest son, Zeenath, Khaleel, Jaleel and Musthaqu.

== See also ==
- Communist Party of India (Marxist)
- Kerala Ministers
