= RamaKoti =

Hindu religious tradition

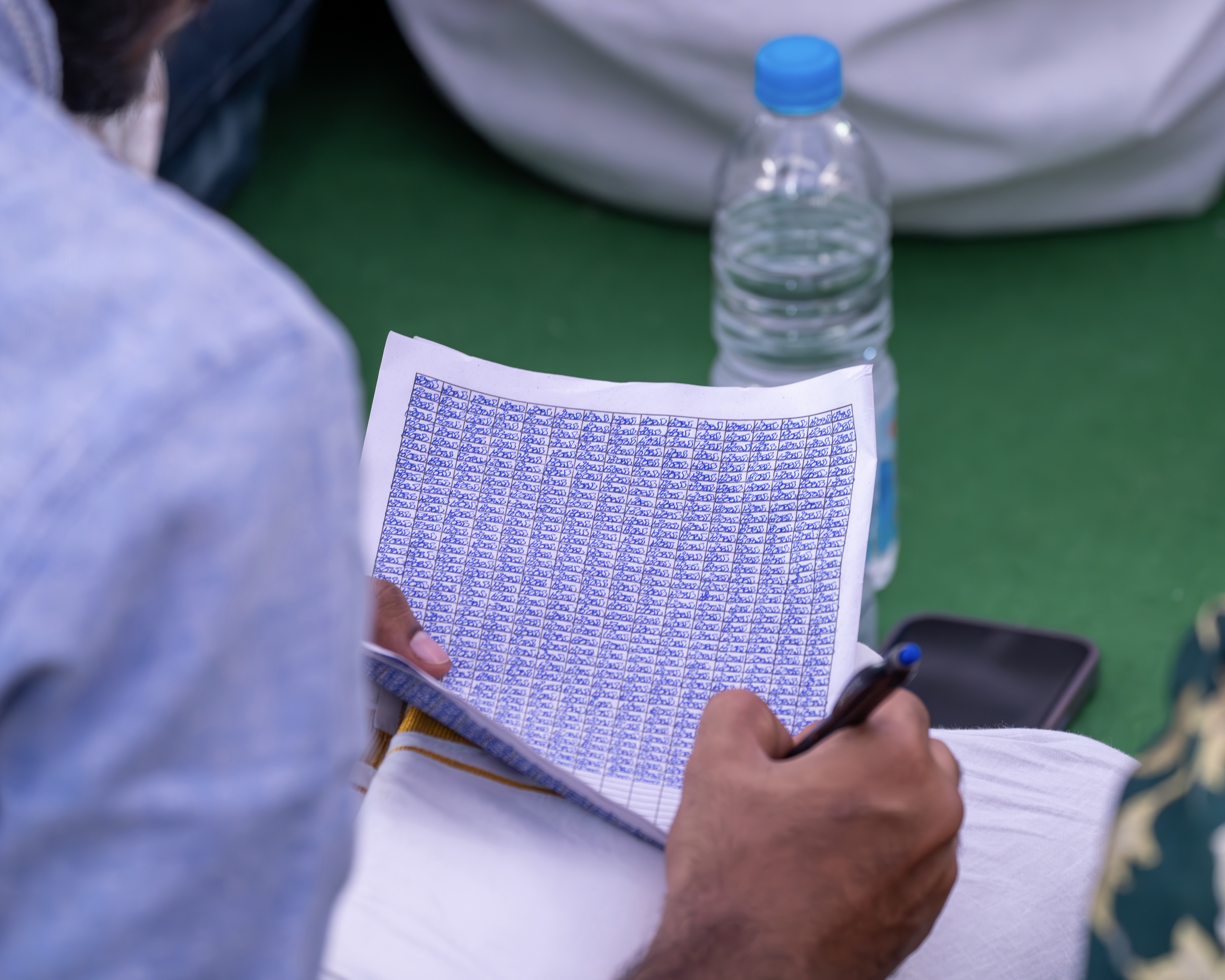
Devotee writing RamaKoti at Bhadrachalam

RamaKoti is a religious tradition of writing the name of the Hindu God Rama in a book ten million times. It is also called as Likhita Japa (Chanting by writing).

RamaKoti is an effective spiritual practice according to Hindu beliefs because many of our senses are engaged simultaneously during this practice.

Though RamaKoti is popular with elderly people, but open to anyone. After finishing the writing, the devotee submits the notebooks to a Sri Rama temple or any other temple that may preserve them. Most often the notebooks are used along with material as a foundation for new temples.
