= P. Sreeramakrishnan =

Indian politician (born 1967)

Speaker of the Kerala Legislative Assembly
- In office 3 June 2016 – 3 May 2021
- Preceded by: N. Sakthan
- Succeeded by: M. B. Rajesh

Member of the Kerala Legislative Assembly
- In office 1 June 2011 – 3 May 2021
- Preceded by: Paloli Mohammed Kutty
- Succeeded by: P. Nandakumar
- Constituency: Ponnani

Personal details
- Born: 14 November 1967 (age 58) Perinthalmanna, Malappuram, Kerala, India
- Party: Communist Party of India (Marxist)
- Spouse: Divya Krishnan
- Children: Niranjana, Priyaranjan
- Parents: P. Govindan Nair; Seethalakshmi
- Education: NSS College, Ottapalam

P. Sreeramakrishnan (born 14 November 1967) is an Indian politician from Kerala. He served as the Speaker of the Kerala Legislative Assembly from 2016 to 2021 and represented the Ponnani constituency as a Member of the Legislative Assembly (MLA) from 2011 to 2021, representing the Communist Party of India (Marxist). Since November 2021, he has served as resident vice chairman of NORKA-Roots, the state government agency for non-resident Keralites.

During his tenure as Speaker, the Assembly launched its dedicated television channel, Sabha TV, in August 2020 to broadcast proceedings. He also oversaw a digitization initiative aimed at reducing paper use, with the first phase of the e-Niyamasabha project completed by January 2020. In August 2018, the Assembly hosted a series of conferences under the banner "Festival on Democracy," inaugurated by President Ram Nath Kovind.

== Early life and education ==
Sreeramakrishnan was born on 14 November 1967 in Perinthalmanna, Malappuram, Kerala, India, to Shri. P Govindan Nair and Smt. P Seetha Lakshmi. He has two siblings who reside in the United Arab Emirates. He completed primary education at Pattikad GLP school and his secondary education at Perinthalmanna G.H.S.S. and Pattikkad G.H.S.S.

In 1983, he enrolled at NSS College, Ottapalam, where he completed his pre-degree coursework and earned a bachelor's degree in arts. During college, Sreeramakrishnan participated in essay writing, elocution, and drama. He won the prize for the best essay in South India at the Inter-University Youth Festival in 1988. After obtaining a BEd degree, Sreeramakrishnan worked as a teacher at the Melattur Ravivarma Mooppil Eradi Higher Secondary School before entering politics.

== Political career ==
He served as the Managing Editor of 'Yuvadhara' magazine. After becoming State Secretary, Sreeramakrishnan was elected as the All India President of DYFI in 2007 in the national meeting held at Chennai and continued in the post until 2012. During his leadership in DYFI, he worked on issues related to youth employment in Kerala and IT professionals in Bangalore.

=== 2011–2020: Kerala Legislative Assembly ===
Sreeramakrishnan contested the elections to the Kerala Legislative Assembly in 2006 from the Nilambur constituency. In 2011, he contested from the Ponnani constituency, winning with a majority of 4,101 votes and becoming a member of the Thirteenth Kerala Legislative Assembly. He won the elections again in 2016, increasing his majority to 15,640 votes from the Ponnani constituency. In the formation of the Fourteenth Kerala Legislative Assembly, Sreeramakrishnan was elected as Speaker of the assembly on 3 June 2016.

External videos
- Rajya Sabha TV Interview with Shri P Sreeramakrishnan

Sreeramakrishnan was elected Speaker with 92 votes, against 46 votes for Shri V. P. Sajeendran. It was noted that the BJP's lone member in the Kerala Legislative Assembly, Shri O. Rajagopal, voted in favor of Sreeramakrishnan. Rajagopal stated that one of the reasons was that UDF had openly stated they did not want the BJP MLA's vote, adding, "It's my vote for Sreeramakrishnan―who is a good public worker and also a friend of mine."

== Career as Speaker ==
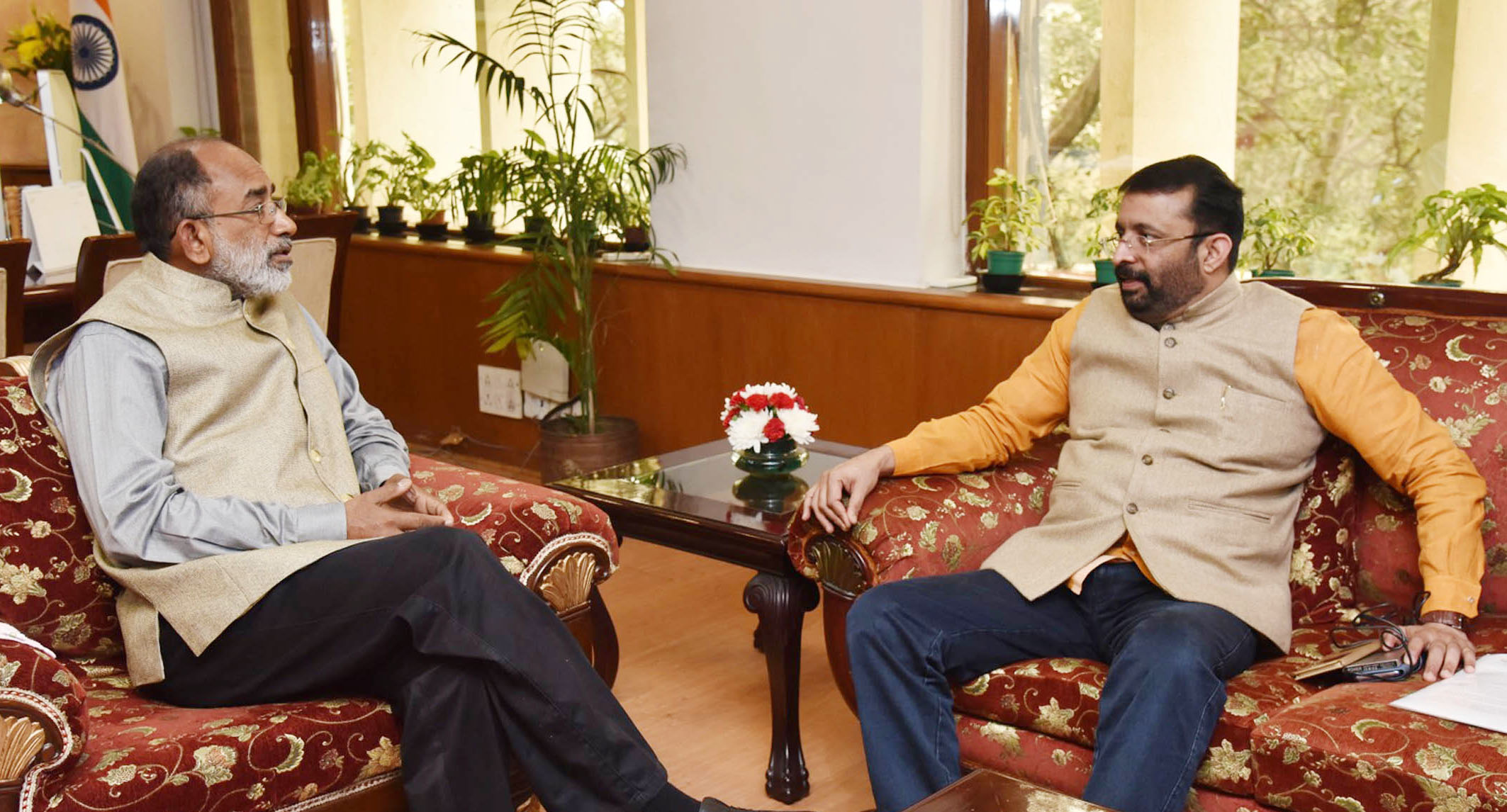
The Speaker of the Kerala Legislative Assembly, P. Sreeramakrishnan meeting the Minister of State for Tourism (IC) and Electronics & Information Technology, Shri Alphons Kannanthanam, in New Delhi on 31 October 2017

Sreeramakrishnan was credited with the digitalization of the Kerala Legislative Assembly and moving it closer to becoming a paperless establishment. The software "E-Niyamasabha" was developed as the first phase in digitalizing the Kerala Legislative Assembly project to make the assembly paper-free, and was completed in January 2020. Sreeramakrishnan first spoke of the move to digitalization in May 2019.

A parliamentary television channel, named Sabha TV, and an Over-the-top (OTT) platform (over the top platform, also known as streaming) were launched. under Sreeramakrishnan's tenure as speaker, to shed light on the history of KLA, the impact of laws passed by it, and to initiate debates and discourses in the public arena. The inauguration celebrating Kerala Sabha TV was conducted by Lok Sabha Speaker Om Birla in Thiruvananthapuram via videoconference on 17 August 2020. The Chief Minister, Pinrayi Vijayan, also joined the programme via videoconference. The OTT platform, Sabha TV, is the first of its kind by a Legislative Assembly in India.

Sreeramakrishnan nominated and pushed for establishing a separate Committee for the welfare of members of transgender community. The scope of this committee also includes socially excluded women, children and those with disabilities.

Sreeramakrishnan brought the proposed plan for a bridge connecting Ponnani harbour with Padinharekara to fulfilment. The infrastructure development in Ponnani, with a budget allocation of Rs. 289 crore via the Kerala Infrastructure Investment Fund Board (KIIFB), is for a proposed suspension bridge which will come up across the Bharathapuzha, connecting Ponnani harbour with Padinharekara. The government began the tendering process for the project in October 2020. The one km-long bridge is set to pass over the estuary where the Bharathapuzha opens out into the Arabian Sea.

=== Festival on Democracy ===
"Festival on Democracy" is a thematic concept envisaged by P. Sreeramakrishnan, which includes multiple national-level conferences aimed at strengthening democracy among the state youth. Its purpose is to develop in the youth a love for democratic values and the democratic way of life. The concept attracted support across the country and was inaugurated by Shri. Ram Nath Kovind, President of India, on 6 August 2018. The Festival on Democracy consists of a string of academic and cultural programs held across Kerala to celebrate the occasion of the Diamond Jubilee of the Kerala Legislative Assembly. It includes seminars, exhibitions, debates, model assembly, and allows certain selected sections to visit the Assembly in Thiruvananthapuram. The event technically comprises six major conclaves: National Women Legislators Conference, National Students Parliament, National Media Conclave on Democracy, Special Conference on Assembly Proceedings and Consensus Conclave on Kerala Development.

=== Loka Kerala Sabha ===
The first Loka Kerala Sabha (LKS) - which can be translated as the World Kerala Assembly - was held under Sreeramakrishnan's speakership in January 2018. The event was hosted in cooperation with the Government of Kerala, to provide a representation platform for Keralites worldwide. This LKS session saw the participation of around 500 delegates from 27 countries. It led to the formation of 7 standing committees that gave recommendations to the government. LKS is intended to be a regular event, held every two years. Since leaving elected office in 2021, Sreeramakrishnan has become the resident vice chairman of NORKA ROOTS, which helps to facilitate the LKS organisation, and he is on the LKS secretariat.

The second Loka Kerala Sabha was opened on 2 and 3 January 2020, by Arif Mohammad Khan, the governor of Kerala, in Thiruvananthapuram. The 2020 Loka Kerala Sabha had 351 participants, consisting of the Members of the Legislative Assembly of Kerala, the Members of the Indian Parliament from Kerala, non-resident Keralites of Indian citizenship nominated by the Kerala government and select members of the returnee community. The non-resident members were chosen from abroad, and other states and territories within India, taking into account diversity in gender, age, and occupational status. They also include some non-resident Keralites who have found notability elsewhere. The second Loka Kerala Sabha suggested to some participants that the measures taken by the government, when considering those recommendations, have benefited expatriates Keralites. Sreeramakrishnan was quoted, after the second LKS, that the objectives of the LKS went beyond being merely an investors' meet-up, and Kerala has become a model to the world. He also added that this platform enabled non-residential Keralites worldwide to come together and share their unique experiences.

=== Ponnani model on flood relief and rehabilitation ===
The Kerala floods in 2018 killed over 400 people and destroyed infrastructure and property. The Ponnani model flood relief work gained international acclaim and was listed as a topic of discussion at a key United Nations Forum. It was also deliberated at the South Asia Together for Humanitarian Imperative (SATHI) held in September 2018. The Kerala Legislative Assembly, led by Sreeramakrishnan, developed a mechanism to calculate the intensity of damages caused. A geographic information system (GIS) drone field survey was carried out in Ponnani from 23 to 30 August 2018. The post datum hosting development- interpretation of the data, mobilising resources, and devising a distribution mechanism, was done by Infosys. It took seven days for the team to identify the affected areas and verify them with the help of technology, as well as volunteers on the field. By using drones synchronised with satellite images to ascertain the route of the flood, false claims on loss of property as well as livestock were weeded out. All distributed relief materials were marked with QR codes to ensure that they were delivered to the correct houses and people. The municipality used this novel method of aerial drone survey to calculate the damage caused by the flood. A virtual platform was developed by IT students to collect data and file it for reference. Furthermore, funds were raised, through co-operative banks, to acquire resources to distribute to those affected.

=== Ponnani fresh water project ===
A freshwater supply project, initiated by Sreeramakrishnan, aims to supply fresh water to Ponnani taluk, in his constituency, and has been completed for Rs. 60 crore, against the budget of Rs. 74.4 crore, thus an underspend of Rs. 14.4 crore. The water treatment plant treats 50 million litres of water per day and aids the Thrikkanapuram Danida project, and is currently pumping a maximum of 65 lakh litres of water. The freshwater project was inaugurated by the Chief Minister Pinarayi Vijayan on 7 February 2021, in the presence of Speaker P Sreeramakrishnan, Ministers KT Jalil, K Krishnan Kutty, and ET Muhammad Basheer MP.

=== Civil works undertaken as MLA of Ponnani ===
The projects included upgrades to the Ponnani Taluk Hospital, the renovation of the historic Ponnani Missouri Church and the Ponnani fishing harbour improvement project.

== Investigations ==
In April 2021, Customs officials questioned Sreeramakrishnan in connection with the Kerala gold and dollar smuggling investigations. He denied wrongdoing, and as of 2022, no charges have been reported against him.

== Electoral performance ==
| Year | Constituency | Party | Votes | Opponent (party) | Votes | Margin |
|---|---|---|---|---|---|---|
| 2011 | Ponnani | CPI(M) | 57,615 | P. T. Ajay Mohan (INC) | 53,514 | 4,101 |
| 2016 | Ponnani | CPI(M) | 69,332 | P. T. Ajay Mohan (INC) | 53,692 | 15,640 |

== Personal life ==
On 18 August 1996, Sreeramakrishnan married M Divya. They have two children, Niranjana and Priyaranjan.

== Political and social views ==
Sreeramakrishnan has been an advocate for youth rights in Kerala. During his tenure as President of DYFI, he called for an uncompromising stand against the imperialistic forces that had created a host of crises like unemployment and spiraling prices due to economic policies pursued by the UPA government at the centre in 2007. He is a member of the Communist Party of India (Marxist) and a patron of DYFI.

== Positions held ==
- Member of the Thirteenth Kerala Legislative Assembly, Ponnani constituency
- Speaker of the Fourteenth Kerala Legislative Assembly
