= Sri Vadapathira Kaliamman Temple =

Hindu temple in Singapore

- ஸ்ரீ வடபத்திர காளியம்மன் கோவில்
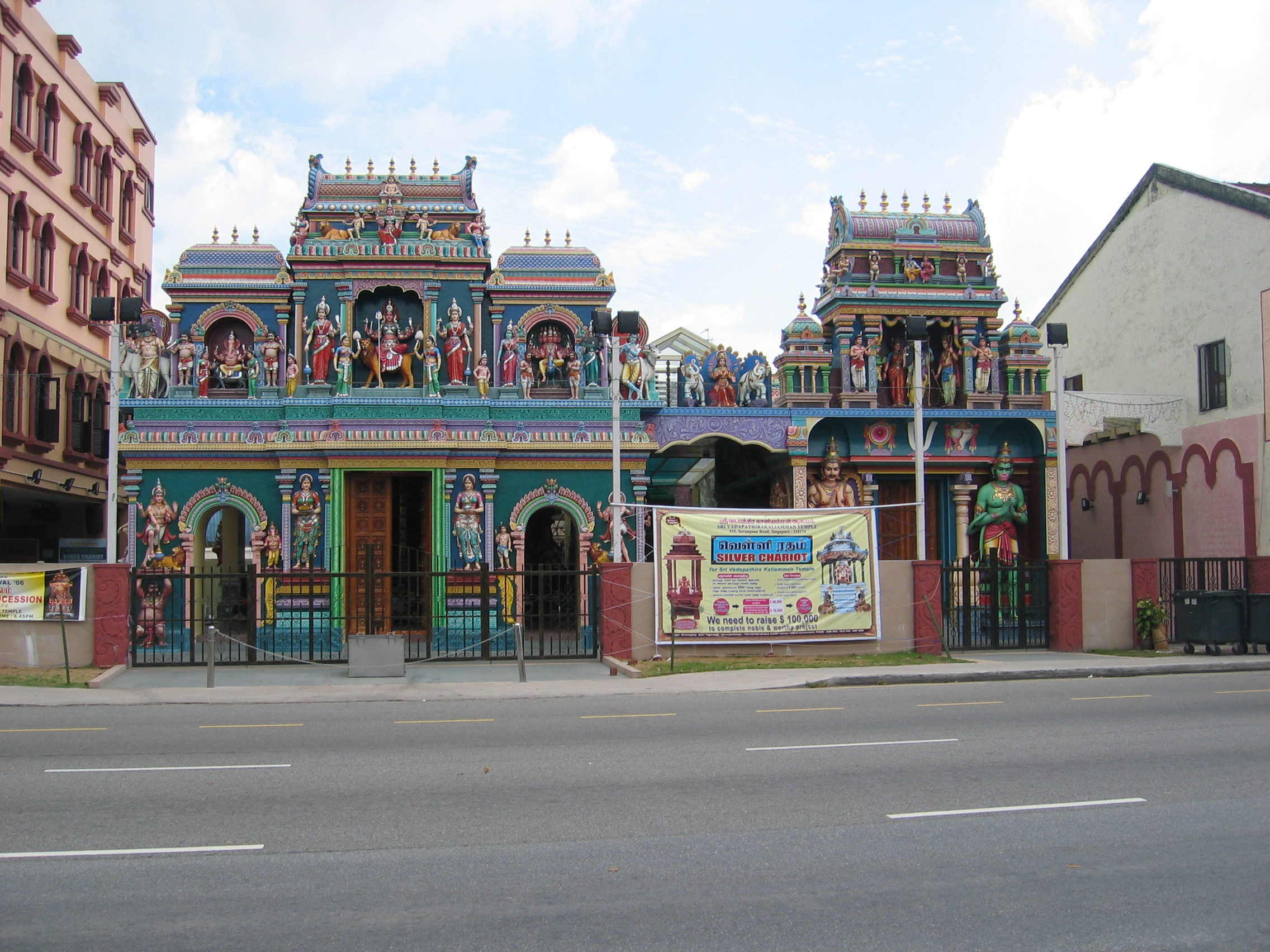

- Location within Singapore

Religion
- Affiliation: Hinduism
- Deity: Vadapathira Kaliamman

Location
- Location: 555 Serangoon Road, Singapore 218174
- Country: Singapore
- Coordinates: 1°18′55.55″N 103°51′28.8″E

Architecture
- Type: Tamil architecture
- Creator: Mr Rengasamy Mooriyar
- Completed: 1830; 196 years ago 1935

Website
- Official Website

Sri Vadapathira Kaliamman Temple is a Hindu temple located at Serangoon Road, Singapore. The temple is dedicated to the goddess Vadapathira Kaliamman, a fierce form of the Hindu goddess Kali. It is the second oldest Hindu temple in Singapore and serves as an important religious and cultural centre for the local Hindu community.

== History ==
The temple is believed to have originated in the 1830s, beginning as a modest shrine with a picture of the goddess placed under a tree near the current temple grounds. Over time, the shrine developed into a full-fledged temple, serving a growing community of Hindu devotees.

The presiding deity, Sri Vadapathira Kaliamman, is considered a powerful form of Goddess Durga known as Sri Nisumbha Soodhani, who was venerated by the Chola dynasty as a family deity for divine protection in warfare. She is also referred to as Rahukala Kaliamman or Vada Bhadra Kaliamman. Many devotees regard her as the female counterpart of Lord Brihadeeswarar, the main deity at the famed Brihadeeswarar Temple in Thanjavur, India.

In 1984, the temple was renovated under the leadership of Mr. S.L.P. Mohan, then chairman of the temple’s committee. Following the works, a 48-day-long consecration ceremony was held. Two 4.2-metre statues of Garuda and Hanuman were installed at the temple's entrance, reportedly the first of their kind in Singapore and Asia.

In 2015, the temple underwent another major renovation, costing S$2 million, and on 9 December 2016, it celebrated a Maha Kumbabishegam (grand consecration ceremony). This renovation included structural enhancements and the installation of several new deities.

== Management ==
The Sri Vadapathira Kaliamman Temple is managed by a Board of Trustees (BOT) and a Temple Management Committee (TMC).

The Temple Management Committee is responsible for the day-to-day operations of the temple, including the conduct of daily worship, festival planning, temple administration, community outreach, and religious programs.

The Board of Trustees oversees the safeguarding of the temple’s assets, as well as the preservation of religious and cultural traditions. The BOT provides strategic direction and ensures that the temple’s long-standing spiritual and heritage values are upheld.

== Deities ==
The temple houses a wide range of deities across various shrines. In addition to the main deity, Sri Vadapathira Kaliamman, the following deities are worshipped at the temple:

Vinayagar Murugan Jambulingeswarar (Lord Shiva) Akhilandeswari Chandikeswarar Swarnakrashna Bhairavar Lakshmi Kuberar Lakshmi Narasimar Nandikeswarar Veerabathirar Navagraham (Nine Planetary Deities) Madurai Veeran Periyachi Amman Muneswaran Nageswary Durgai Amman Ramar (Lord Rama) Ajeneyar (Hanuman) Garuda Shirdi Sai Baba

== Major Festivals ==
Navaratri – Celebrated over nine nights in honour of the Divine Mother, featuring daily abhishekams, alankarams, cultural performances, and annadhanams. Aadi Month Festivals – Including Aadi Pooram and Aadi Krithigai, which are especially significant for goddess worship. Kandha Sashthi – A six-day festival commemorating the victory of Lord Murugan over the demon Surapadman, observed with fasting, special poojas, and devotional activities. Panguni Uthiram – Celebrates the celestial weddings of divine couples such as Lord Shiva and Parvati, and Lord Murugan and Deivanai, often marked with Kalyana Utsavams (wedding ceremonies). Maha Shivaratri – A night-long vigil with continuous pujas, bhajans, and abishekams in honour of Lord Shiva. Tamil New Year (Puthandu) – Marked by special rituals, archanais, and community prayers to welcome the new year. Deepavali – The festival of lights is observed with elaborate pujas, lighting of lamps, and spiritual discourses. Maha Chandi Homam – A powerful Vedic fire ritual dedicated to Goddess Chandi, performed for divine protection, prosperity, and the removal of obstacles

== See also ==
- List of Hindu temples in Singapore
