= Ponnani Assembly constituency =

Constituency of the Kerala legislative assembly in India

Ponnani
- Constituency No. 48 for the Kerala Legislative Assembly
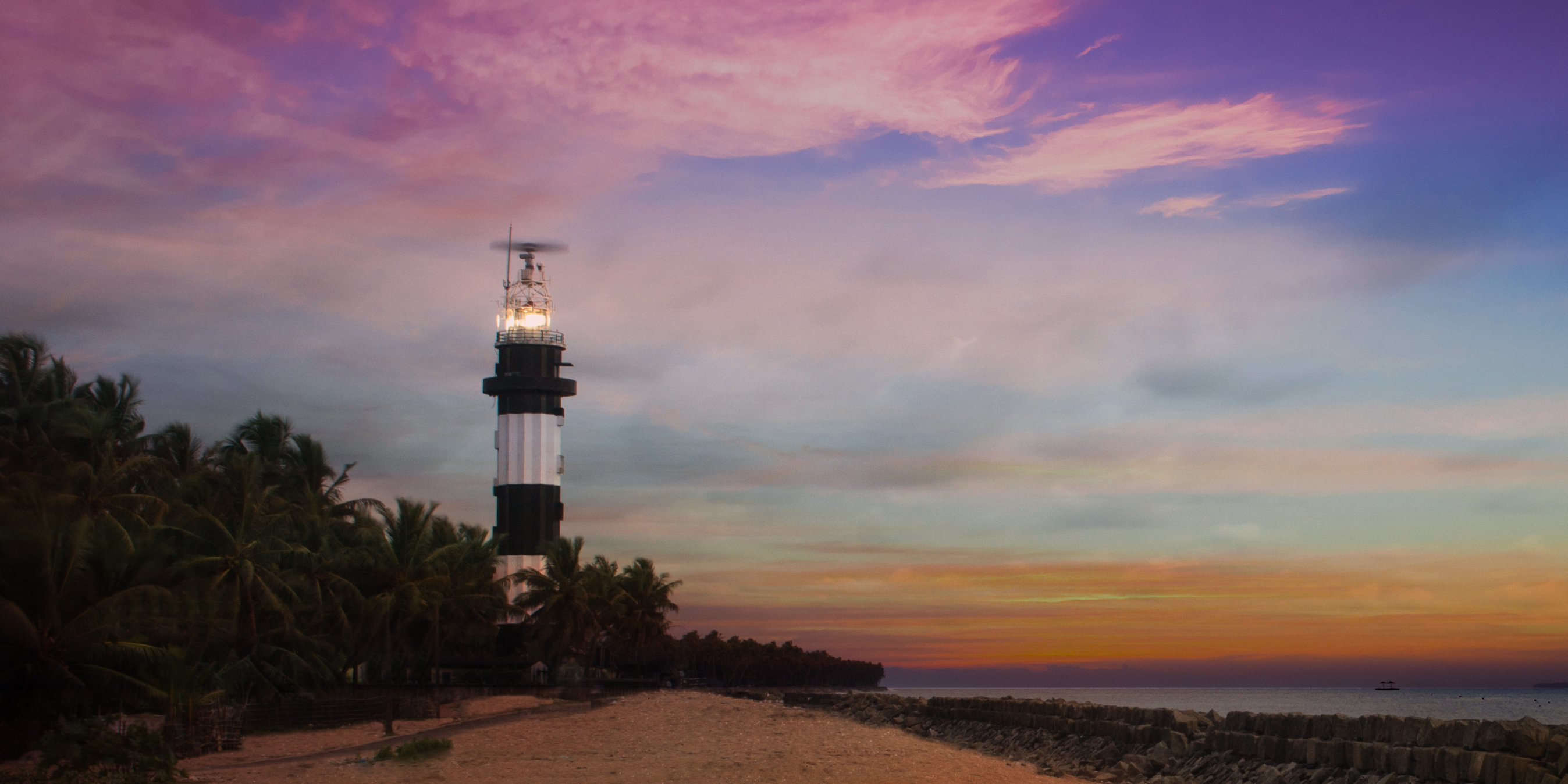
- Ponnani Lighthouse

Constituency details
- Country: India
- Region: South India
- State: Kerala
- District: Malappuram
- Established: 1951
- Total electors: 2,05,291 (2021)
- Reservation: None

Member of Legislative Assembly
- 16th Kerala Legislative Assembly
- Incumbent K. P. Noushad Ali
- Party: INC
- Elected year: 2026

Ponnani State assembly constituency is one of the 140 state legislative assembly constituencies in Kerala. It is also one of the seven state legislative assembly constituencies included in Ponnani Lok Sabha constituency. Ponnani Assembly constituency is located right in the middle of the Kerala coast. As of the 2026 Assembly elections, the current MLA is K. P. Noushad Ali of INC.

== Local self-governed segments ==
Ponnani Assembly constituency is composed of the following local self-governed segments:

Sl no.	Name	Status (Grama panchayat/Municipality)	Taluk
1	Ponnani	Municipality	Ponnani
2	Marancheri	Grama panchayat	Ponnani
3	Alamkode	Grama panchayat	Ponnani
4	Nannamukku	Grama panchayat	Ponnani
5	Perumbadappu	Grama panchayat	Ponnani
6	Veliyankode	Grama panchayat	Ponnani

Ponnani Assembly constituency

== Members of Legislative Assembly ==
The following list contains all members of Kerala Legislative Assembly who have represented Ponnani Assembly constituency during the period of various assemblies:

Election	Niyama Sabha	Name	Party	Tenure
1957	1st	K. Kunhambu	Indian National Congress	1957 – 1960
1957	1st	Kunhan Eliyath Tharayil	Communist Party of India	1957 – 1960
1960	2nd	V. P. C Thangal	Indian Union Muslim League	1960 – 1965
1960	2nd	K. Kunhambu	Indian National Congress	1960 – 1965
1967	3rd	V. P. C Thangal	Indian Union Muslim League	1967 – 1970
1970	4th	Haji M. V. Hydros	Independent	1970 – 1977
1977	5th	M. P. Gangadharan	Indian National Congress	1977 – 1980
1980	6th	K. Sreedharan	Communist Party of India	1980 – 1982
1982	7th	M. P. Gangadharan	Indian National Congress	1982 – 1987
1987	8th	P. T. Mohana Krishnan	Indian National Congress	1987 – 1991
1991	9th	E. K. Imbichi Bava	Communist Party of India	1991 – 1996
1996	10th	Paloli Mohammed Kutty	Communist Party of India	1996 – 2001
2001	11th	M. P. Gangadharan	Indian National Congress	2001 – 2006
2006	12th	Paloli Mohammed Kutty	Communist Party of India	2006 – 2011
2011	13th	P. Sreeramakrishnan	Communist Party of India	2011 – 2016
2016	14th	P. Sreeramakrishnan	Communist Party of India	2016 - 2021
2021	15th	P. Nandakumar	Communist Party of India	2021 - 2026
2026	16th	K. P. Noushad Ali	Indian National Congress	2026 -

== Election results ==
=== 2025 ===
SEGMENT	LDF	NDA	UDF	IND	SDPI	WPI		LEADING ALLIANCE
PONNANI	24337	5885	20182	950	502	399	52255	LDF
MARANCHERY	9319	1930	10855	782	1355	0	24241	UDF
ALAMKODE	8784	1624	11213	31	569	293	22514	UDF
NANNAMUKKU	7742	2442	9011	0	200	0	19395	UDF
PERUMBADAPPU	8229	777	9346	28	91	749	19220	UDF
VELIYANKODE	10224	653	9640	83	599	170	21369	LDF
TOTAL	68635	13311	70247	1874	3316	1611	158994	
%	43.16829566	8.372014038	44.1821704	1.17866083	2.085613294	1.013245783		

=== ASSEMBLY ELECTIONS ===
Percentage change (±) denotes the change in the number of votes from the immediate previous election.

=== 2026 ===
2026 Kerala Legislative Assembly election: Ponnani
Party	Candidate	Votes	%	±%
INC	K. P. Noushad Ali	80,674	49.81	▲10.18
CPI(M)	Adv. M. K. Sakkeer	67,407	41.62	▼9.73
BDJS	Maneesh Janakeeyam	10,210	6.30	▲1.20
SDPI	Anwar Pazhanji	1,971	1.22	▼0.89
NOTA	None of the above	762		
Independent	Noushadali	324		
Independent	Sakkeer S/o Muhammed	279		
Independent	Sageer M. K.	197		
Independent	Sakkeer S/o Illyas	149		
Margin of victory		13,267		
Turnout		1,61,973		
INC gain from CPI(M)		Swing		

=== 2021 ===
There were 2,05,291 registered voters in Ponnani Assembly constituency for the 2021 Kerala Assembly election.

2021 Kerala Legislative Assembly election: Ponnani
Party	Candidate	Votes	%	±%
CPI(M)	P. Nandakumar	74,668	51.35	▲2.44
INC	A.M Rohith	57,625	39.63	▲1.76
BDJS	Subramannian Chunkappallii	7,419	5.10	−
SDPI	Anvar Pazhanji	3,065	2.11	▲0.94
WPOI	Ganesh Vaderi	1,863	1.28	▼0.16
NOTA	None of the above	467	0.32	▼0.11
Independent	Roshith M.P	168	0.12	−
Independent	K.Sadanandan	147	0.1	−
Margin of victory		17,043	11.72	▲0.68
Turnout		1,45,422	70.83	▼3.48
CPI(M) hold		Swing	▲2.44	

=== 2016 ===
There were 1,90,774 registered voters in Ponnani Assembly constituency for the 2016 Kerala Assembly election.

2016 Kerala Legislative Assembly election: Ponnani
Party	Candidate	Votes	%	±%
CPI(M)	P. Sreeramakrishnan	69,332	48.91	▲1.36
INC	P. T. Ajay Mohan	53,692	37.87	▼6.30
BJP	K. K. Surendran	11,662	8.23	▲3.54
WPOI	M. M. Shakkir	2,048	1.44	−
PDP	M. Moidunni Haji	1,857	1.31	−
SDPI	Abdul Fathah	1,659	1.17	▼1.51
NOTA	None of the above	604	0.43	−
Independent	Sindhukumari P. S.	386	0.27	−
Margin of victory		15,640	11.04	▲7.66
Turnout		1,41,763	74.31	▼2.04
CPI(M) hold		Swing	▲1.36	

=== 2011 ===
There were 1,58,680 registered voters in the constituency for the 2011 election.

2011 Kerala Legislative Assembly election: Ponnani
Party	Candidate	Votes	%	±%
CPI(M)	P. Sreeramakrishnan	57,615	47.55	
INC	P. T. Ajay Mohan	53,514	44.17	
BJP	V. T. Jayaprakash	5,680	4.69	
SDPI	Yahiya Koya Thangal	3,250	2.68	
Independent	Ajayan	1,099	0.91	
Margin of victory		4,101	3.38	
Turnout		1,21,158	76.35	
CPI(M) hold		Swing		

=== 1952 ===
1952 Madras Legislative Assembly election: Ponnani
Party	Candidate	Votes	%	±%
INC	N. Gopala Menon	32,619	21.05	21.05
CPI	E. T. Kunhan	28,665	18.50	
Independent	K. C. Sankaran	25,519	16.47	16.47
KMPP	A. C. Raman	20,599	13.29	
	T. Mustafa	19,457	12.56	
Socialist Party (India)	K. P. Koppan	11,924	7.70	
Socialist Party (India)	Mohamad	9,668	6.24	
Independent	C. Uani	6,494	4.19	
Margin of victory		3,954	2.55	
Turnout		1,54,945	93.12	
Registered electors		1,66,384		
INC win (new seat)				

== See also ==
- Ponnani
- Malappuram district
- List of constituencies of the Kerala Legislative Assembly
- 2016 Kerala Legislative Assembly election
