= T. A. Ahmed Kabir =

Indian politician

T. A. Ahmed Kabeer

Member of Kerala Legislative Assembly
- In office 2011–2021
- Preceded by: Manjalamkuzhi Ali
- Succeeded by: Manjalamkuzhi Ali
- Constituency: Mankada

Personal details
- Born: 3 November 1955 (age 71) Alappuzha
- Party: IUML
- Spouse: K.M Najma
- Children: four daughters

T. Abdul Khader Ahmed Kabir was a member of 16th Kerala Legislative Assembly. He was a member of Indian Union Muslim League and represents Mankada constituency. He was previously elected to Kerala Legislative Assembly in 2011 representing Mankada constituency.

== Positions held ==
- General Secretary, District Committee, M.S.F. (1972)
- Member, Muslim Youth League First State Council (1973)
- Treasurer (1975), Secretary (1982) and General Secretary (1983) of Muslim Youth League State Committee
- President, Muslim Youth League District Committee, Ernakulam (1975)
- President and General Secretary of Muslim League Ernakulam District Committee
- President, KSTEO, STU District Committee, Ernakulam
- Chairman, Quaide Mullath Foundation, SIDCO, UEL, Kollam, KEL
- Vice President, KMEA
- Resident Editor, Chandrika daily (Kochi Edition)
- Editor, Sargadhara Magazine
- Secretary, State Muslim League Committee
- Member, Ernakulam District Council
- Syndicate Member, Mahatma Gandhi University; CUSAT
- Executive Member, Samastha Kerala Sahithya Parishath and Kerala History Association
- Secretary, State Muslim League Committee (present)
- Executive Member, Indian Union Muslim League All Indian Committee (present)

== Personal life ==
He is the son of pa Abdul Kahader and Haleema. He was born at Alappuzha on 3 November 1955. He has a master's degree in arts.
