= Sri Siva Durga Temple =

Hindu temple in Singapore

- ஸ்ரீ சிவதுர்கா கோவில்
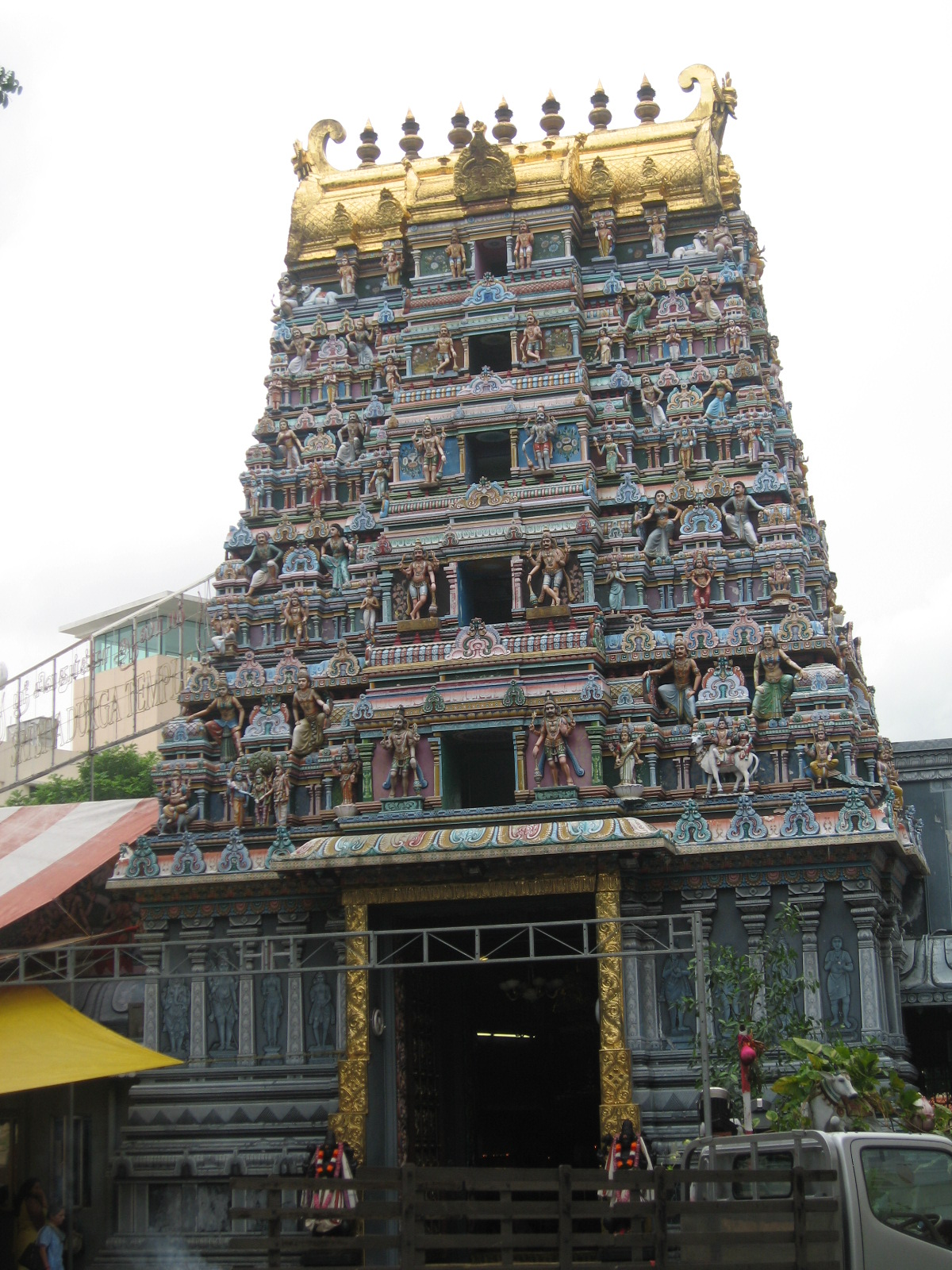

- Location within Singapore

Religion
- Affiliation: Hinduism
- Deity: Shiva and Durga

Location
- Location: 8 Potong Pasir Avenue 2, Singapore 358362
- Country: Singapore
- Interactive map of Sri Siva Durga Temple
- Coordinates: 1°19′54.4″N 103°52′0.67″E

Architecture
- Type: Dravidian architecture
- Completed: 1906; 120 years ago

Website
- http://www.sivadurga.com/index.aspx

Sri Siva Durga Temple (Tamil: ஸ்ரீ சிவதுர்கா கோவில்) is a temple for the god Shiva and Durga who are the presiding deities located in the Potong Pasir subzone of the Toa Payoh planning area, Singapore.

== History ==
In 2014, the temple was demolished due to issues such as water leakage, lack of space and ventilation problems. The sculpture of Hindu goddess Sri Durga remained in its original spot, encased in bricks to protect it while the temple is rebuilt around it. The rebuilding costs $2.7 million and finished in 2016.

On 4 Dec 2016, a consecration ceremony was held by the temple with the help of its coffeeshop neighbour, PP 881 Eating House and the Mahakaruna Buddhist Society.

== See also ==
- List of Hindu temples in Singapore
