= V. P. C Thangal =

Indian politician (born 1916)

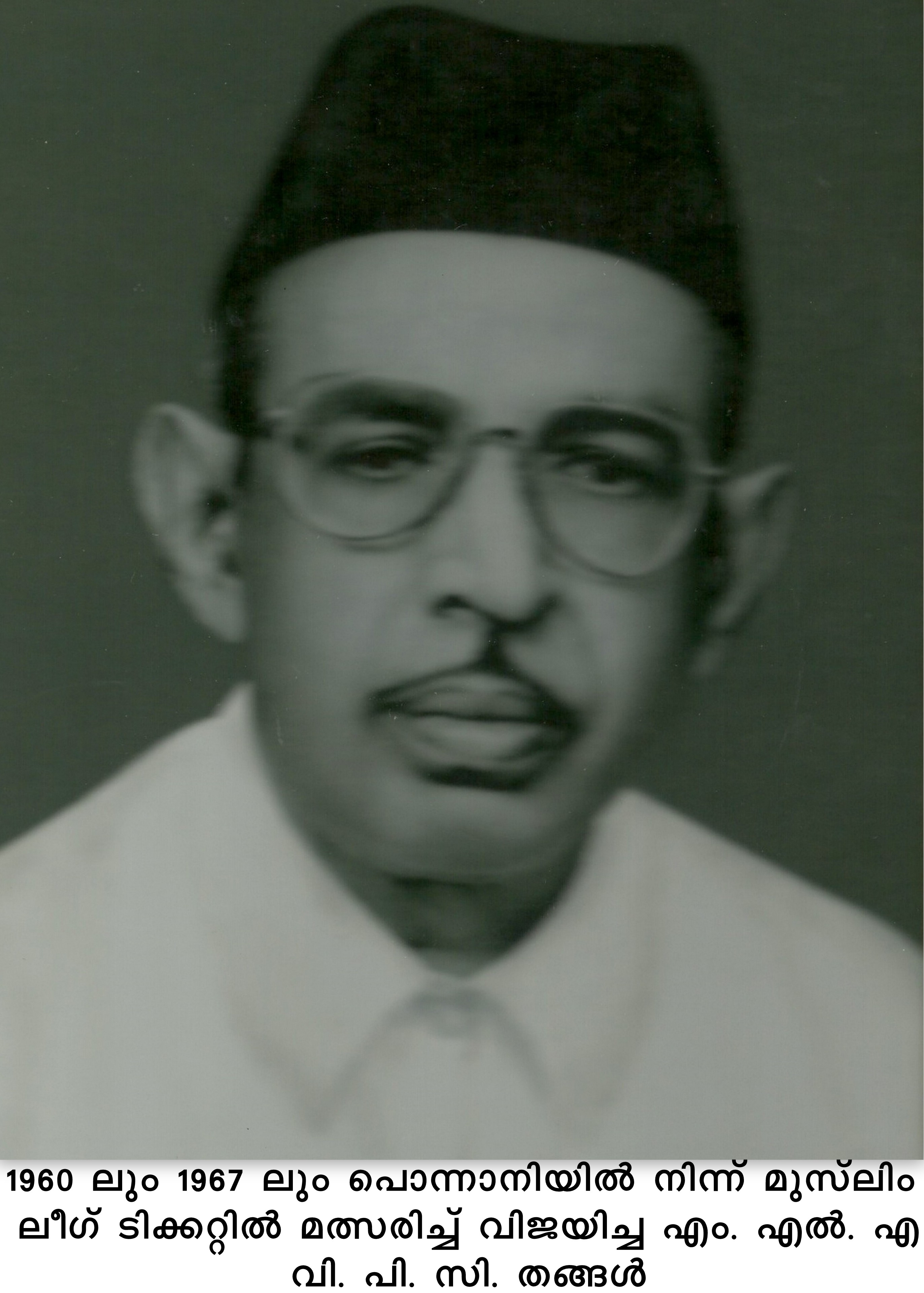

Member of Kerala Legislative Assembly
- In office 1960–1964
- Preceded by: Kunhan Eliyath Tharayil
- Succeeded by: E.T. Kunjan
- Constituency: Ponnani

Personal details
- Born: 1916 Ponnani
- Died: 1983 (aged 66–67)
- Party: Indian Union Muslim League

V. P. C Thangal also known as Vettam Pokiriyanakath Cherukoya Thangal (June 1916 – 16 September 1983) was a prominent leader of the Indian Union Muslim League (IUML) and former Member of the Legislative Assembly of Kerala in 1960.

== Biography ==
V.P.C. Thangal, popularly known as Cherukoya Thangal, was a politician and former legislator from Kerala. He was elected to the second and third Kerala Legislative Assembly as a Muslim League representative from Ponnani constituency. He lost to K.G. Karunakara Menon in the 1965 elections.
