= Sri Ruthra Kaliamman Temple =

Hindu temple in Singapore

- ஸ்ரீ ருத்ர காளியம்மன் கோவில்
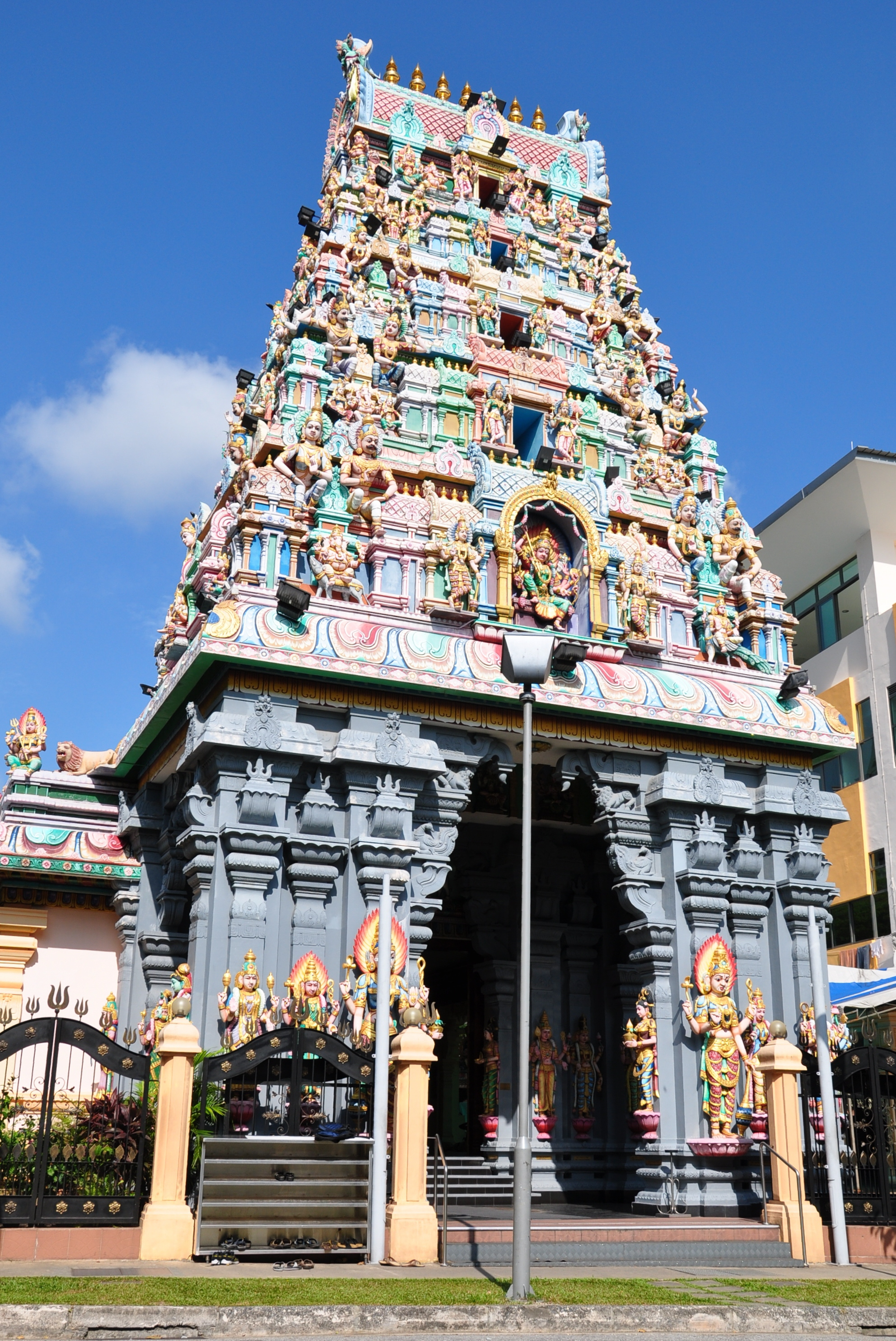

- Location within Singapore

Religion
- Affiliation: Hinduism
- Deity: Kali

Location
- Location: 100 Depot Road, Singapore 109670
- Country: Singapore
- Coordinates: 1°16′53.08″N 103°48′50.09″E

Architecture
- Type: Dravidian architecture
- Creator: Lakshmana Nadar
- Completed: 1913; 113 years ago

Sri Ruthra Kaliamman Temple (Tamil: ஸ்ரீ ருத்ர காளியம்மன் கோவில்) is a temple for the goddess Kali who is the presiding deity, along Depot Road, in Bukit Merah, Singapore. The other deities of the temple include Sri Vinayagar, Sri Subramaniar, Sri Muneeswaran, Navagrahas, Sri Kaleeswarar, Sri Mangalambigai, Sri Dhakshinamoorthy, Sri Sandigeswarar and Sri Nandeeswarar.

== History ==
Sri Ruthra Kaliamman Temple was originally a small shrine, housed in a wooden building, situated at the Alexandra Brickworks grounds at Pasir Panjang Road (present location of Port of Singapore Authority, PSA building) and catered to the Hindus working at Brickworks and those who lived in the surrounding areas.

Mr. Lakshmana Nadar, an employee at Brickworks, is believed to have been responsible for building this shrine in 1913. In 1923, through the assistance of the Borneo Company, whose subsidiary was the Alexandra Brickworks, the wooden structure was replaced by a brick building to give it the form of a simple temple.

=== Management Committee ===
Mr Letchumanan Nadar initially looked after the affairs of the Temple. He was succeeded in turn by Messrs Solai Padaiyachi, Pumpaya Nadar, Shanmuga thevar and P. Ramasamy. A Management Committee was formed in 1958 under the chairmanship of Mr. Rengiah to be followed by succeeding Management Committees in 1960, 1963, 1967 and 1969 with Messrs Neelamegam Pillai, P. Ramasamy, S. Karralasingam and V. Sivapragasam, respectively as Chairmen.

The temple was maintained through donations collected from among its devotees - both the Hindu employees of the Brickworks and those from the surrounding areas. The Borneo Company and later the Alexandra Brickworks had, for many years, made an official contribution of S$10.00 per month until the early part of 1967. The Pasir Panjang Power Station's Hindu employees gave good support in later years when the Brickworks' Hindu employees numbers had diminished.

However, there were periods in the not too distant years preceding June, 1967 when the temple lacked funds even for its running expenses. Through approaches made by Priest M. Doraisamy, a new Management Committee was set up on 27 May 1967 with Mr S. Karalasingam as Chairman. The new Committee devised ways and means for the systematic collection of funds to meet the Temple's pooja expenses, priest's remuneration and other expenditure. It also renovated the Temple building including some structural alterations to provide better convenience to devotees.

=== Maha Kumbabishegam on 1968 ===
Then followed the Asthabandana Maha Kumbabishegam (Consecration Ceremony) on 11 February 1968 for the installation of new granite statue of Sri Ruthra Kaliamman to replace the non granite (suthai) statue of the Deity. On 23 October 1969, the Prathishtai (Supplementary Consecration Ceremony) was conducted to install the granite statues of Sri Vinayagar and Sri Subramaniar to replace framed pictures of these Deities. The late Mr. K. Raman Nair, an employee of Pasir Panjang Power Station, and a staunch supporter of the Temple - ordered the three statues from India and donated them to the Temple.

=== Depot Road Premises ===
About two years later, on 2 December 1971, Alexandra Brickworks' Management served notice on the Temple to quit by 30 June 1972 as it had decided to sell its property to the Port of Singapore Authority. After protracted negotiations, the Brickworks Management and the Temple's Management Committee agreed upon the sum of S$260,000/- as outright compensation to vacate the Temple premises. With the assistance of the late Mr. S.L.Perumal (the Temple Adviser) the four Deities, Sri Ruthra Kaliamman, Sri Vinayagar, Sri Subramaniar and Sri Muneeswaran were moved during the Balasthabana Prathisthai (Temporary installation Ceremony) on 5 February 1973 to the Sri Manmatha Karunya Eeswarar temple at 249, Cantonment Road, Singapore 089772, where they were to remain until a new temple was built to reinstall them.

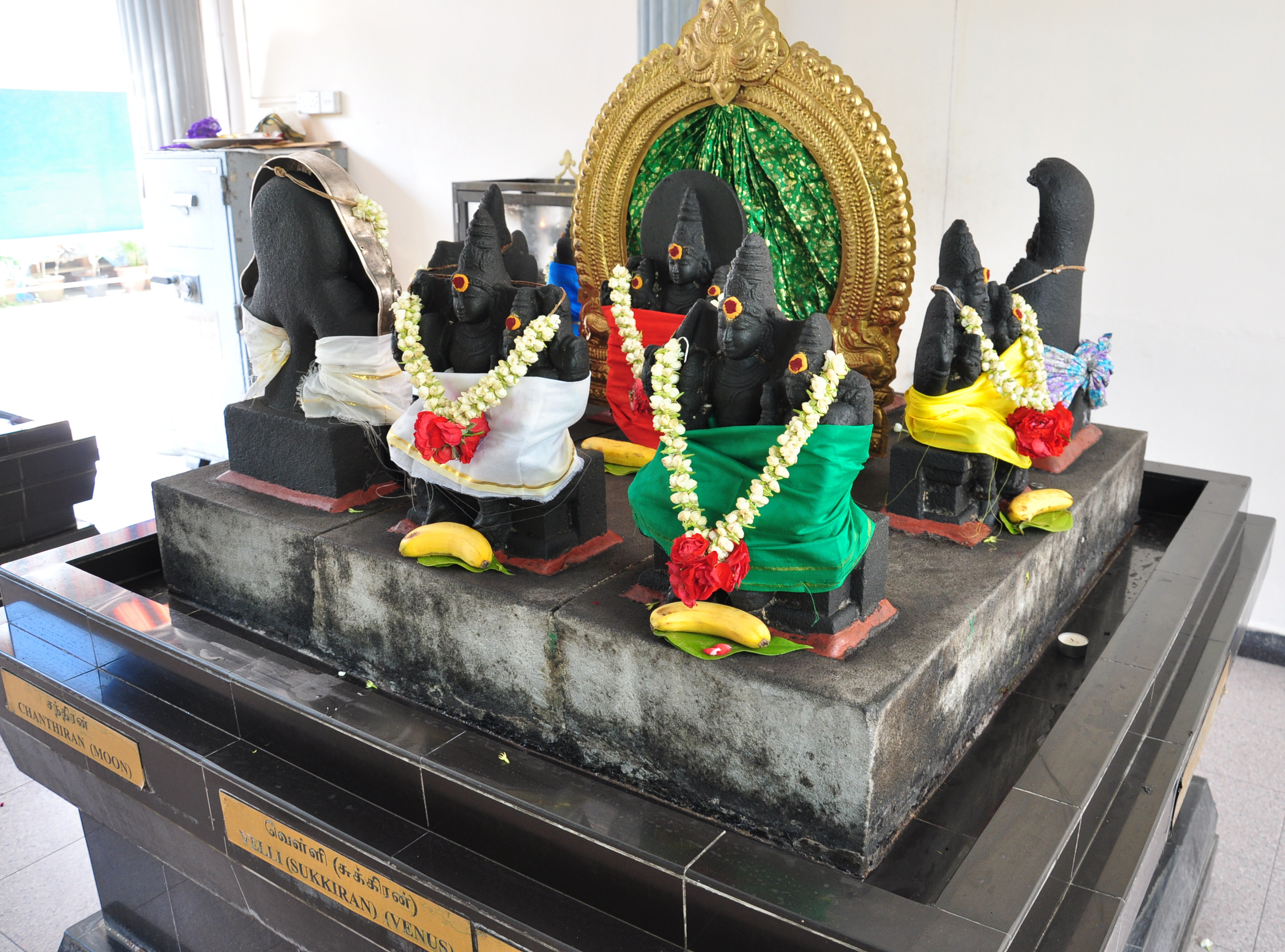
Navagraha deities in Sri Ruthra Kaliamman Temple.

Later the temple was demolished as Alexandra Brickworks sold the land to the Port of Singapore Authority. Meanwhile, construction work for the new temple began on 27 October 1980 after the Housing Development Board (HDB), invited tenders, in February 1978, through the press for a religious site 2,000 sqm (21,528 sq.ft) in area at Depot Road on a 99-year lease - which was successfully tendered by the Temple Management for $195,687/-.

The consecration of the temple on 11 September 1983 marked the climax of 10 years of the effort by one and all in the successful shaping of the Temple. On 27 November 1987, the Sakthi Sametha Navagrahas Kumbhabishegam was held, the first of its kind in Singapore. Such statues are also very rarely found - even in India. Another significant ceremony was the inaugural Flag Raising Ceremony, which was held on 22 April 1988.

With fund limitation, the idea of a neo-classical temple at 10 times the initial financial resources available was thought to be building castles in the air but it slowly but surely materialized. Apparently the success story of the birth of the new updated temple costing about $2.7 million.

== Social activities ==
The Temple complex has a distinct and separate 4-storey annex block which makes it complete to hold activities such as social, educational and cultural activities.

Services offered by the temple include

- Yoga classes
- Carnatic music lessons
- Astrological services
- Wedding ceremonies, etc

== See also ==
List of Hindu temples in Singapore
