= Sri Manmatha Karuneshvarar Temple =

Hindu temple in Singapore

- ஸ்ரீ மன்மத காருணீஸ்வரர் கோவில்
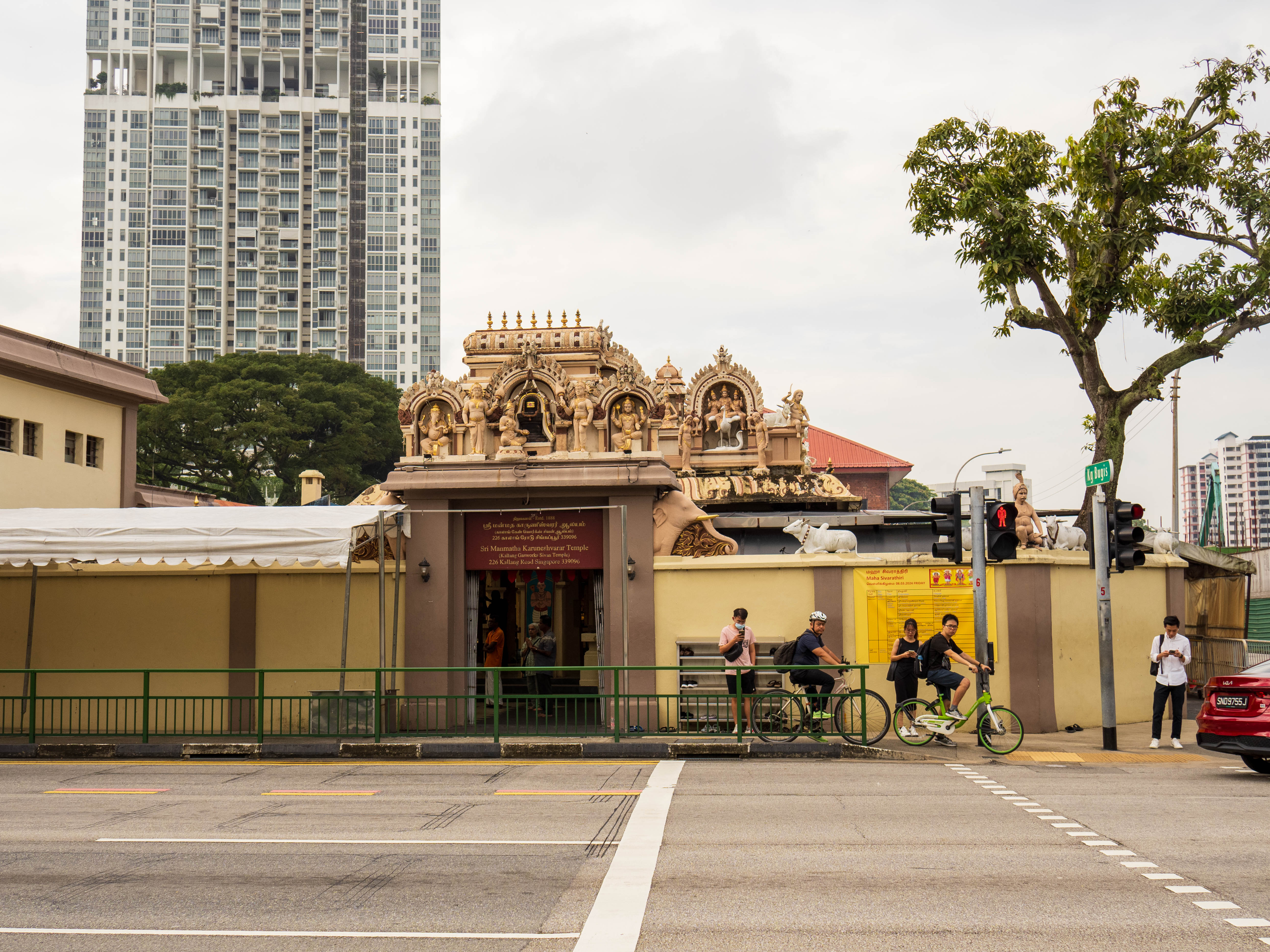
- Temple view from Kallang Road

- Location within Singapore

Religion
- Affiliation: Hinduism
- Deity: Shiva

Location
- Location: 226 Kallang Road
- Country: Singapore
- Interactive map of Sri Manmatha Karuneshvarar Temple
- Coordinates: 1°18′32.16″N 103°51′57.37″E

Architecture
- Type: Dravidian architecture
- Creator: Soona Veloo Vendir, Nagalingam Kathiraysonm, Annamalai Mecppa Komarasamy and Veerapatra Mudaliar
- Completed: 1 January 1888

Sri Manmatha Karuneshvarar Temple (Tamil: ஸ்ரீ மன்மத காருணீஸ்வரர் கோவில்) or Sivan Temple is a Hindu temple for Sri Manmatha Karuneshvarar Sivan or Shiva as the presiding deity located on Kallang Road in Singapore.

== History ==
The temple was established on 1 January 1888 on a lease from the Governor of the Straits Settlements for the Tamil community as a place of worship, this temple is known to its devotees as the Kallang Gasworks Sivan Temple. It was established soon after the Municipal Gasworks depot was set up in Kallang Road. The large number of Hindu employees started a shrine and installed the main deity to seek its protection as well as to sustain their Hindu traditions and values.

In 1909, the site, an area of 8,255 square feet (766.9 m^{2}), was granted on government lease for 99 years made in favour of four persons; Soona Veloo Vendir, Nagalingam Kathiraysonm, Annamalai Mecppa Komarasamy and Veerapatra Mudaliar. In 1934, after their death, the sons of A.V. Irullappa Pillay, V. Pakirisamy Pillai and V. Narayanasamy Pillai funded the reconstruction of the temple in memory of their late father at the request of the Hindu devotees. Although the lease was renewed in 1909, the plan to build a concrete mandapam (main hall) ran into financial difficulties. In March 1937, three trustees were appointed by the Chief Justice of Singapore; they were V. Pakrisamy, V. Narayanasamy and Balakrishna Murugase Thirunalam. After the consecration ceremony on 19 August 1937, a Committee of Management was formed with A.V. Irullappa Pillay, a foreman of the Municipal Gas Works, as chairman.

Further renovations were carried out in 1974 and the sons of V. Parkirisamy and grandsons of V. Narayanasamy are now managing the Temple.

Though there were not many Hindus in Kallang and Kampong Bugis, the Hindu employees of the Gas Depot had living quarters close to the Depot and so they built the shrine. At that time Indians were concentrated in Tanjong Pagar and Serangoon area.

Lord Siva is the destroyer while his consort, Parvati, is looked upon as an almighty Mother figure that pleads to Lord Siva on the behalf of mankind and creatures. However, even though he represents destruction, Lord Siva is viewed as a positive force or even the Destroyer of Evil, since creation follows destruction. Lord Siva has five jobs creator, preserver, destroyer, hiding the sins and blessing.

== See also ==
List of Hindu temples in Singapore
