= P. T. Ajay Mohan =

Indian politician (born 1965)

Personal details
- Born: 10 May 1965 (age 61) Ponnani, Malappuram, Kerala
- Citizenship: India
- Party: Indian National Congress
- Spouse: Parvathi Ajay Mohan
- Profession: Politician; Social Worker
- Website: www.facebook.com/ptajay.mohan.7

Parakulangara Thazathel Ajay Mohan is a social and political leader in Kerala. Ajay Mohan was born on 10 May 1965, as the fourth child and second son of PT Mohanakrishnan and Nalini Mohanakrishnan.

== Personal life ==
Following his father PT Mohanakrishnan, All India Congress Committee (AICC) member and former Member of the Legislative Assembly (MLA), Ajay Mohan entered politics through K.S.U. while doing his studies in Sree Krishna College, Guruvayoor.

He has held various positions in the Indian National Congress (INC) party. He has served as the Youth Congress Ponnani Block President, Youth Congress Malappuram District President and Malappuram DCC General Secretary.

Presently he is the Kerala Pradesh Congress Committee (KPCC) secretary. Along with it he handles the responsibilities of Malappuaram District Bank Director and Andathode Co-operative Bank President.

== Political career ==
Ajay Mohan is currently secretary of the KPCC and Overseas Indian Cultural Congress (OICC) member. He was also the candidate representing the INC in the Ponnani constituency for the 2011 Kerala Legislative Assembly election, in which he lost by a small margin of 4,101 votes.

In May 2015 Ajay Mohan started an indefinite hunger strike demanding a detailed probe into the alleged irregularities in the construction of Chamravatom RCB and Ponnani fishing harbour, at Ponnani on 26 May 2015.

== Positions held ==
- Secretary, Kerala Pradesh Congress Committee
- Block President - Youth Congress, Ponnani
- District President - Youth Congress, Malappuram
- General Secretary - District Congress Committee.
