= Sri Senpaga Vinayagar Temple =

Hindu temple in Singapore

- ஶ்ரீ செண்பக விநாயகர் ஆலயம்
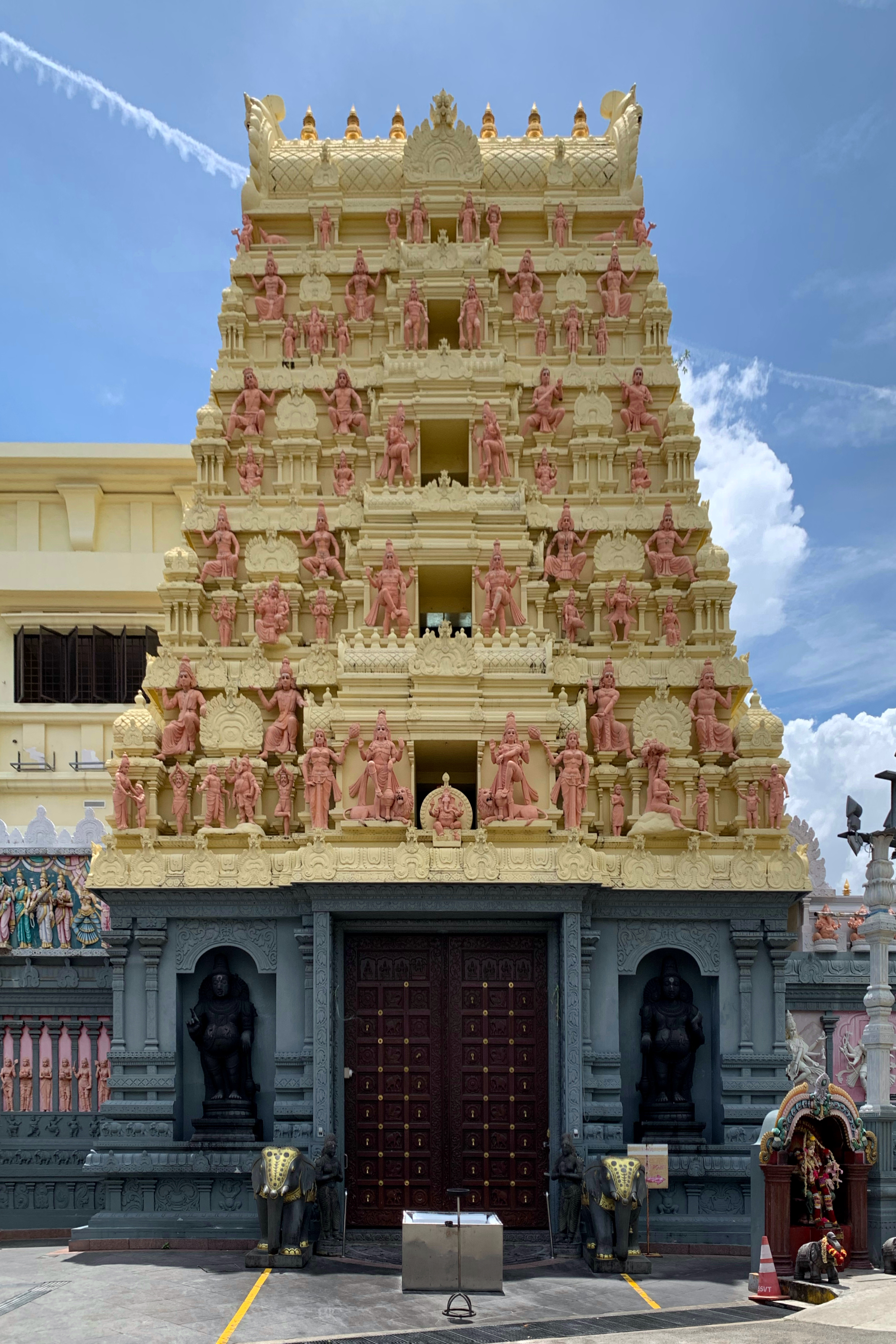
- Entrance Gopuram of Sri Senpaga Vinayagar Temple

- Location within Singapore

Religion
- Affiliation: Hinduism
- Deity: Ganesha
- Festival: Vinayagar Chaturthi

Location
- Location: 19 Ceylon Road, Singapore 429613
- Country: Singapore
- Interactive map of Sri Senpaga Vinayagar Temple
- Coordinates: 1°18′20.02″N 103°54′8.69″E

Architecture
- Type: Dravidian architecture
- Creator: Mr Ethirnayagam Pillai (Pillay)

Map

Sri Senpaga Vinayagar Temple (Tamil: ஶ்ரீ செண்பக விநாயகர் ஆலயம்) is one of the oldest Hindu temples in Singapore, located at 19 Ceylon Road in the Katong district. Dedicated to Ganesha (Vinayagar), it was established in the 1850s by Sri Lankan Tamil Ceylon Tamil immigrants and has been managed by the Singapore Ceylon Tamils' Association (SCTA) since 1923. Built in the Dravidian architectural style, the temple is notable for its 21-metre Raja Gopuram entrance tower and a musical pillar — the first of its kind in Southeast Asia. On 7 February 2003, it was gazetted as a Historic Site by Singapore's National Heritage Board.

== History ==
Sri Senpaga Vinayagar Temple traces its origins to the 1850s, when a statue of Lord Vinayagar was discovered beside a pond on what is now Ceylon Road in the Katong area of Singapore. A Chempaka tree — known as Senpaga in Tamil — stood on the bank of the pond near the statue, giving the temple its name. Ceylonese Tamil pioneer Ethirnayagam Pillai led the construction of the first structure, a modest attap-roofed shelter built with the help of local Indian workers, establishing one of the earliest Hindu shrines of the Ceylonese Tamil community in Singapore.

By 1909, the Ceylonese Tamil community had grown to around 300 families and formally established the Singapore Ceylon Tamils' Association (SCTA). In 1923, the SCTA purchased the land on which the temple stands and became its official keeper and manager. A new concrete structure was completed in 1929, and the first Maha Kumbhabishegam (consecration ceremony) was held on 3 February 1930.

During the Second World War, the temple was damaged by a bomb. Restoration work began in 1949 under Dr P. Thillainathan, and a second consecration ceremony was held on 7 July 1955. Further consecrations followed in 1970 and 1983.

In the late 1990s, structural deterioration prompted the SCTA to undertake a full rebuilding programme.

On 7 February 2003, the temple held its fifth consecration and was declared as a historic site by the National Heritage Board of Singapore.

=== Consecration ceremonies ===
In 1930, the first Maha Kumbhabishegam was held with the help of generous donations from the chairman. Many community leaders and devotees permitted the addition of several new shrines within the precincts of the temple. They included shrines for Lord Shiva, Goddess Ambal, and Lords Subramaniam, Vairavar and Nageswarar. On 3 February 1930, a major Consecration (Maha Kumbhabishegam) of the temple was held for the first time.

In 1942, during the Second World War, when a bomb damaged the temple, the restoration began under the chairmanship of P. Thillainathan and six years later on 7 July 1955, devotees witnessed another Consecration Ceremony.

== Facilities ==
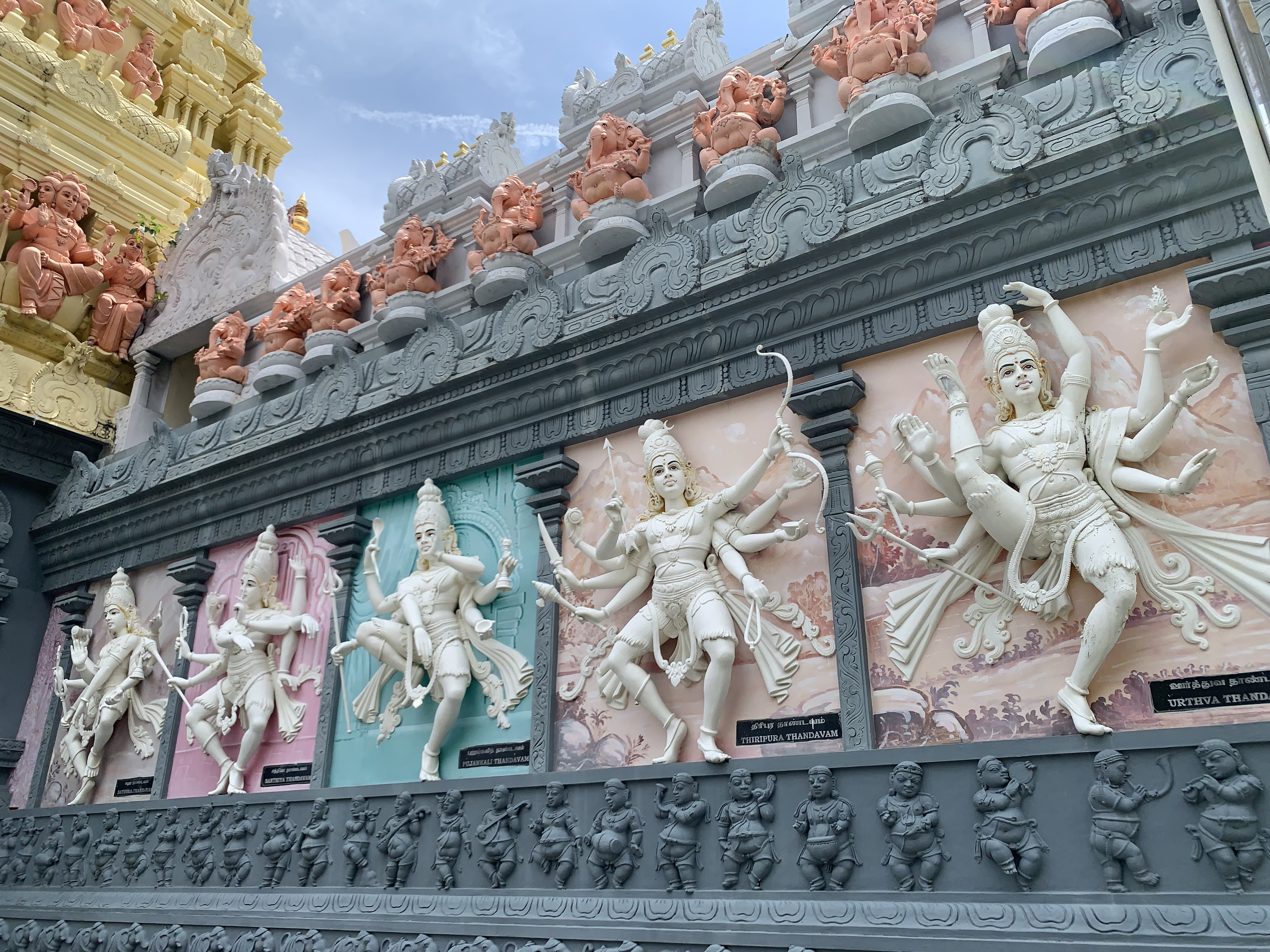
Exterior wall of the temple features various Thandavam of Shiva

The temple has many facilities during the initial construction. The periodic upgrading, inclusive of a three storey extension, of the temple resulted in the addition of classrooms, Halls, Kitchens, library and a wedding hall. The wedding and dining hall was opened on 8 November 1989 by Senior Minister, S. Rajaratnam.

== See also ==
- List of Hindu temples in Singapore
