= Ramapuram, Malappuram =

Ramapuram
- Gramapanchayat
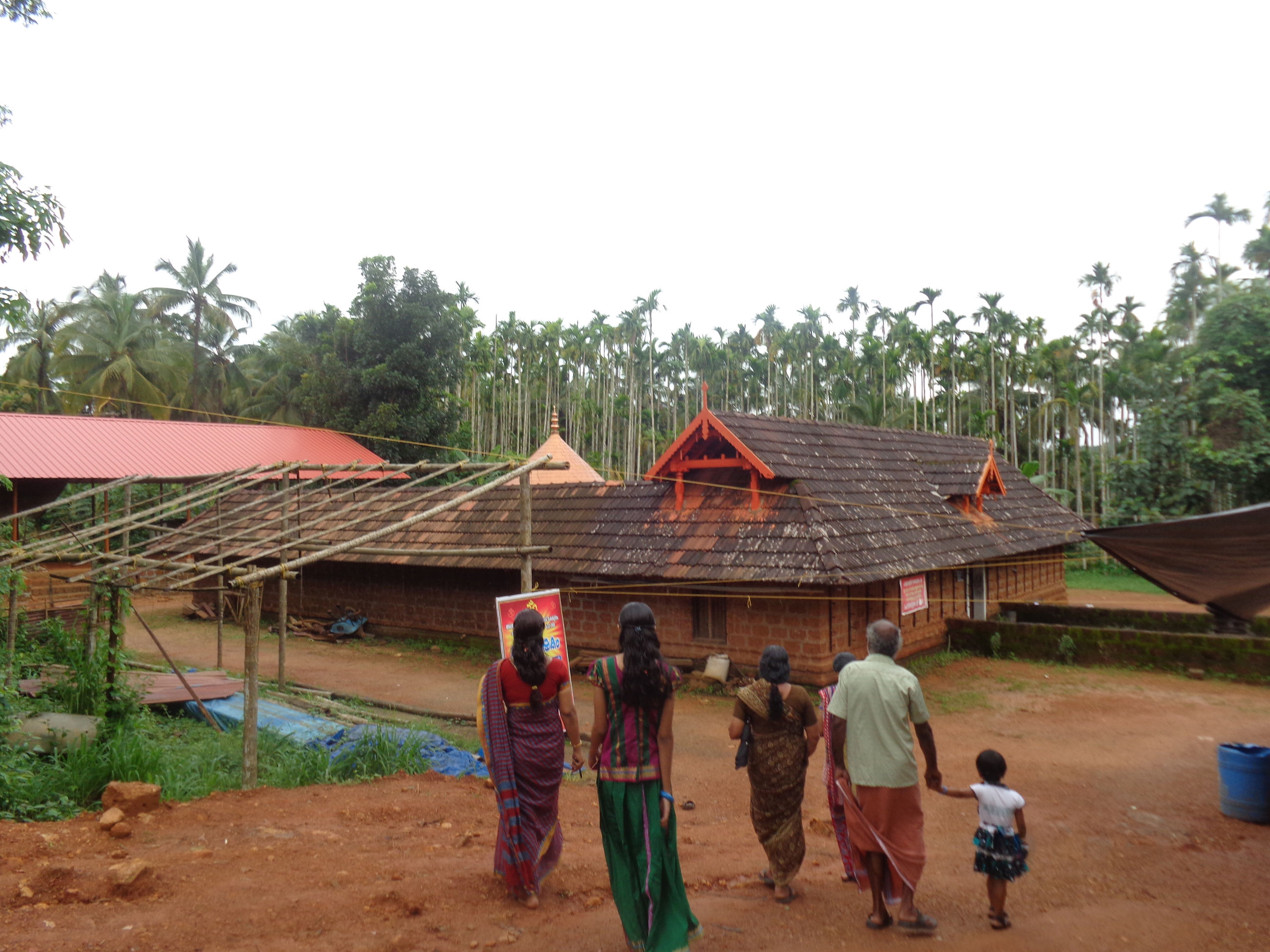
- Ayodhya Lakshmana temple, Ramapuram

- Location in Kerala, India
- Coordinates: 10°59′50″N 76°8′45″E
- Country: India
- State: Kerala
- District: Malappuram
- Named for: Temple of lord Sri Rama

Languages
  - Official: Malayalam, English
- Time zone: UTC+5:30 (IST)
- Nearest city: Malappuram, Perinthalmanna
- Lok Sabha constituency: Malappuram

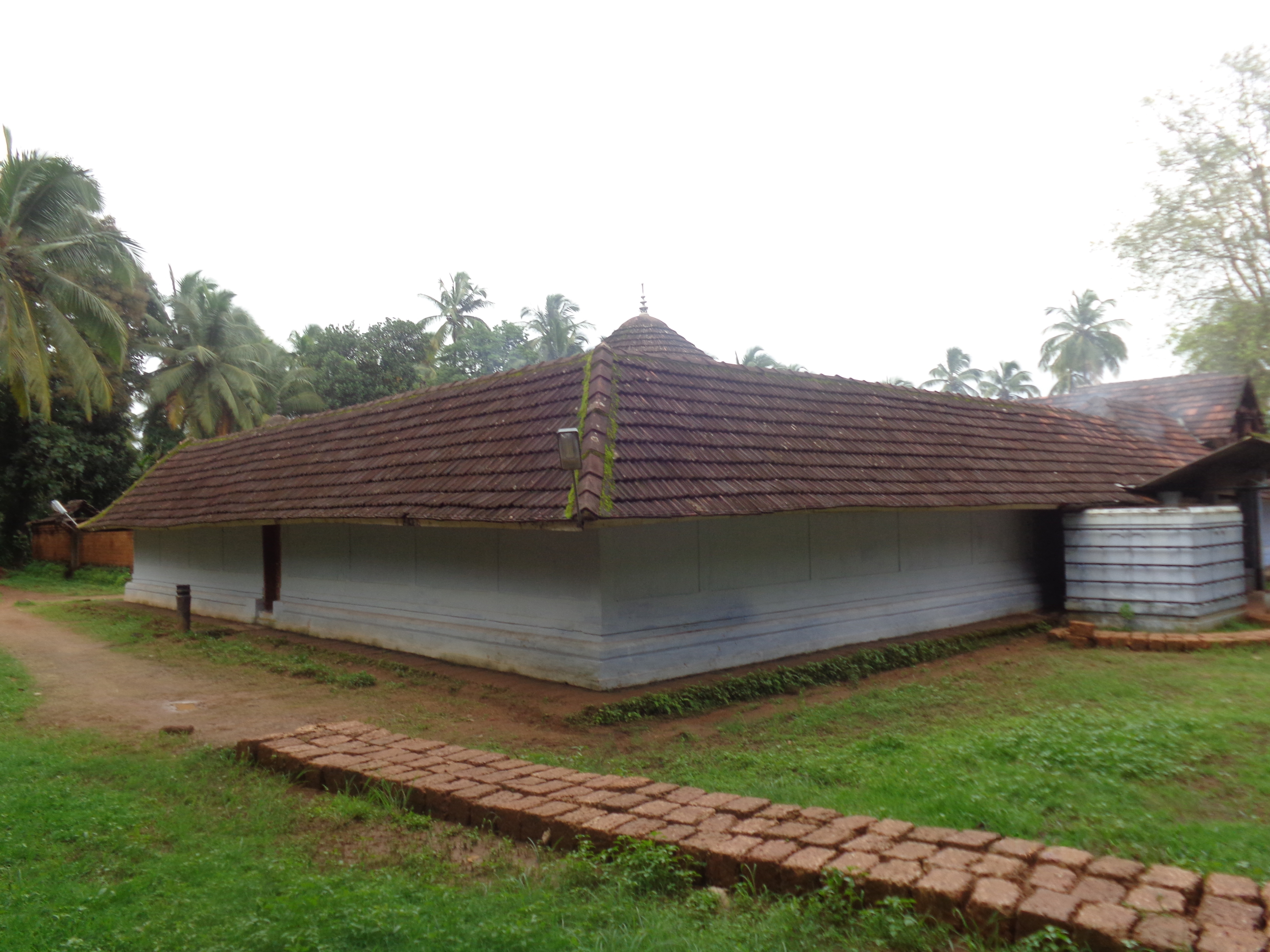
Rama Temple, Karichapady

Ramapuram is a suburb of Malappuram in the Indian state of Kerala. Ramapuram is 10 km from the district HQ city Malappuram towards Palakkad on National Highway-966. The Malappuram showrooms of both TOYOTA and NISSAN are located at Panangangara, The Kammukkil family is in Ramapuram. Ramapuram in Puzhakkattiri grama panchayath. Temples of lord Sri Rama, Sita, Lakshmana, Bharatha and Sathrughna are within a range of two kilo meters. During Karkidaka month of Malayalam calendar (known as Ramayana month)thousands of devotees from across Kerala come here for Nalambala Darshan (offering prayers at temples of Rama and his brothers in a single day). Now efforts are being done to recover the lost Sita Devi (wife of Rama) temple.

Ekadasi (eleventh lunar day) of Malayalam calendar month kumbham generally comes in feb- march is the celebration day for all Ramapuram natives.
