= P. T. Mohana Krishnan =

Indian politician (1934–2020)

P T Mohanakrishnan

Personal details
- Born: 27 March 1934 Ponnani, Malappuram, Kerala
- Died: 10 January 2020 (aged 85)
- Citizenship: India
- Party: Indian National Congress
- Spouse: Nalini Mohana Krishnan
- Profession: Politician; Social Worker

Parakulangara Thazathel Mohanakrishnan (Malayalam: പി.ടി.മോഹന കൃഷ്ണൻ; 27 March 1934 – 10 January 2020) was a distinguished Indian politician and social worker. Throughout his extensive career, PT made significant contributions to Kerala's political landscape, particularly through his association with Indian National Congress. He was the youngest member to join the All India Congress Committee (AICC) at the time. P T Mohanakrishnan has served as a MLA representing Ponnani constituency during 1987 - 1991.

== Political career ==
His political journey began during his school years, and he achieved the remarkable feat of becoming an elected AICC member at the age of 24. Guided by his political mentor Panampilly Govinda Menon and serving as a close confidant of K Karunakaran, he emerged as the first politically appointed Chairman of the Guruvayur Devaswom Board, receiving the blessings of the Samoothiri Raja's family, who had previously held sway over the Temple Administration. His dedicated service continued as the Member of the Legislature from Ponnani constituency, Kerala, during the term 1987-91 by defeating prominent Communist leader Embichi Bava. Despite his affluent upbringing, he devoted most of his personal wealth to party development and aiding anyone who sought his assistance. Renowned as an unswerving party loyalist, his unyielding commitment to constitutional values endeared him to individuals across generations, party lines, and diverse backgrounds.

== Personal life ==
Mohanakrishnan was born to Shri K P Govinda Menon and Smr. Annapoorneswari Amma on 27 March 1934. He lived in Ponnani with his wife Nalini Mohanakrishnan. They had 5 children: 3 daughters, Asha Ramachandran, Hema Mohan & Sindhu Unni; and 2 sons, P T Sudheer Govind and P. T. Ajay Mohan, who is an active politician.

== Positions held ==
- Member of Legislative Assembly, Ponnani (Assembly constituency).
- Chairman, Guruvayur Devaswom Board
- Elected member of All India Congress Committee at the age of 24.
- Chairman and vice president of Kerala State Bamboo Corporation.
- K.P.C.C. Executive committee, Member, Vice President and Acting President of Malappuram D.C.C.
- Chairman - UDF Kerala, Malappuram District
