= Sree Ramar Temple =

Temple for the Hindu god Rama

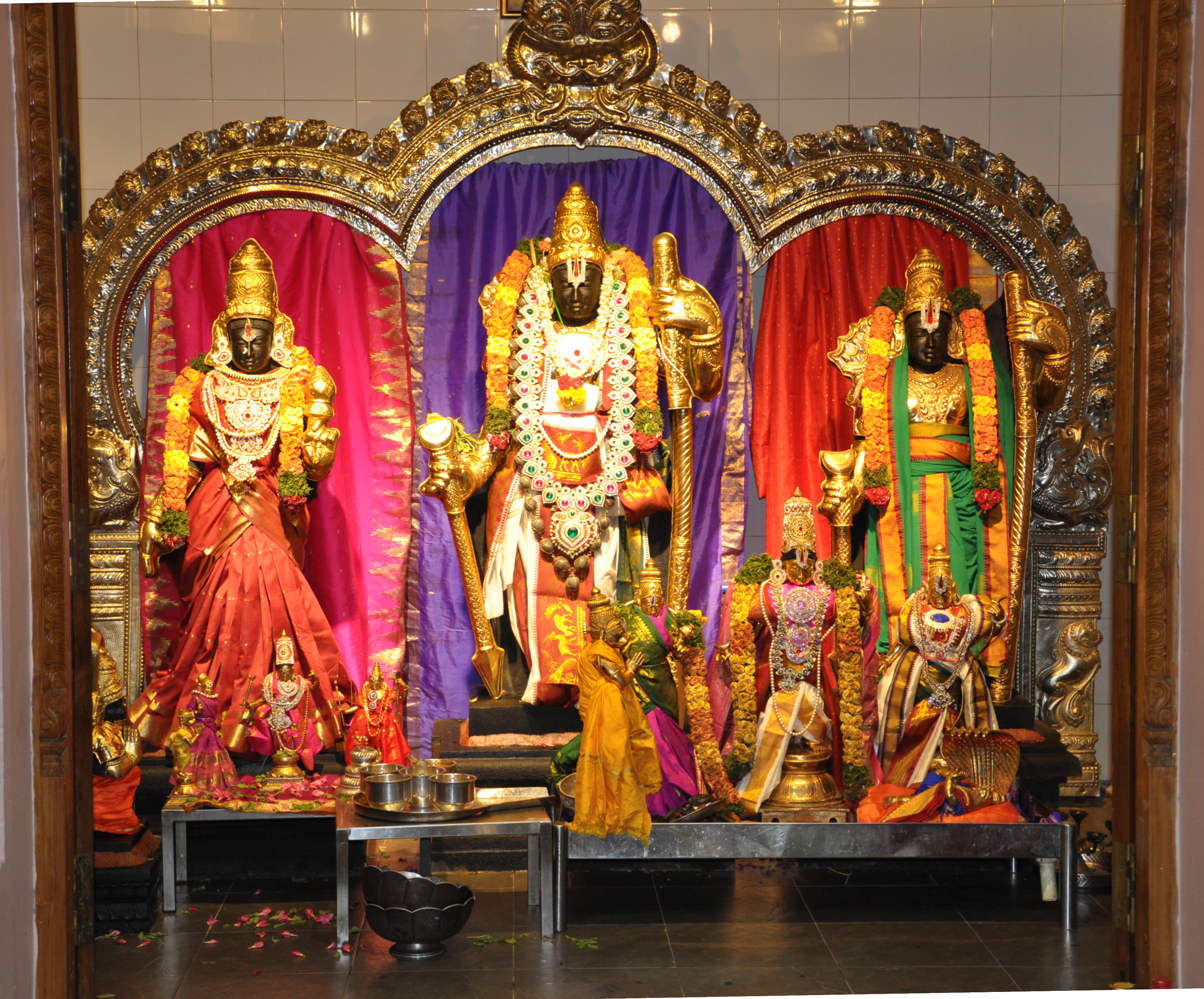

- Location within Singapore

Religion
- Affiliation: Hinduism
- Deity: Rama

Location
- Location: 51 Changi Village Road, Singapore 509908
- State: East Region
- Country: Singapore
- Coordinates: 1°23′16.66″N 103°59′12.86″E

Architecture
- Type: Dravidian architecture
- Creator: Ram Naidu

Website
- Official Website

Sree Ramar Temple (Tamil: ஸ்ரீ ராமர் கோவில்) is a temple for the Hindu god Rama, who is the presiding deity. It is located at the junction of Changi Village Road and Loyang Avenue in the east of Singapore.

== History ==
The temple started with a shrine at the foot of a tree at the present temple site. The shrine was a place of worship for the people in the nearby localities. The temple was built in 1946 by Ram Naidu, from the British Indian Army, on a site donated by the British Army at the end of the Second World War. It was originally known as the Ramar Temple and was patronised by Hindu workers of the nearby Royal Air Force Changi base. Over time, people living in the surrounding areas came there to participate in the daily prayers and activities.

The Loyang Avenue Redevelopment Project almost forced the temple to relocate; however, with the steady resolve of the temple's supporters and with the assistance of Teo Chong Tee, then Member of Parliament for Changi, the temple won its fight to keep its premises. And it continues to serve the spiritual needs of Singaporeans living in the eastern part of Singapore at its present location in Changi.

The temple also incorporates three other Hindu temples and shrines that were displaced by urban development in 1999:

- Sri Manmatha Karunya Eswarar temple, which was located at 249 Cantonment Road
- Sri Muthu Mariamman Temple, formerly at Eng Neo Avenue
- Sri Palani Aandavar Shrine, which was located at Kranji Sea.

== Management Committee ==
In the early 1990s, a pro-term committee was formed and a proposed constitution for the temple was drafted. On 26 January 1993, it was officially registered as a Society with the Registrar of Societies, which was a significant milestone in the temple's history. Subsequently, the first management committee was formed to take over the affairs of the temple under the leadership of N.K. Sundararajoo.

S.No.	Name	Role
1	Mr. N. K. Sundararajoo	President
2	Mr. S. Vivakanandan	Vice President
3	Mr. Senthiran M. Canoo	Hon. Secretary
4	Mrs. S. Sivakamasundari	Hon. Asst. Secretary
5	Mr. R. Manevannan	Hon. Treasurer
6	Mr. P. Manivannan	Hon. Asst. Treasurer
7	Mrs. D. Meenatchi	Committee Member
8	Mr. K. Kangatharan	Committee Member

== Religious and social activities ==
The Sree Ramar temple has seen a steady increase in its congregation due to the establishment of public housing estates in Tampines, Pasir Ris, Simei and the East Coast. To serve the increasing Hindu community, the management committee organizes several annual religious activities, such as:

- Ramar Navami
- Hanuman Jayanthi
- Navarathiri festival
- Thiruvilakku pooja
- Chandi homams

The temple serves the social and educational needs of the devotees by organizing activities for families and children. To serve the local community better, the temple recently underwent sculptural, repainting and general renovation work.

== Modern redevelopment and new temple project ==
The Sree Ramar Temple has undergone continuous development since the late 20th century, reflecting the growth of the Hindu community in eastern Singapore. A major rebuilding exercise in 1991 saw the installation of granite idols within newly constructed sanctums. The temple further expanded in 1999 through the incorporation of several displaced shrines, including the Sri Manmatha Karunya Eswarar Temple, Sri Muthu Mariamman Temple, and Sri Palani Aandavar Shrine.

In the early 1990s, the temple formalised its administration and was registered as a society on 26 January 1993.

In the 2020s, plans were initiated to construct a new temple complex as part of broader infrastructure redevelopment in the Changi area, which requires the existing temple site to be vacated. The new temple will be built adjacent to the current premises, with interim arrangements made to relocate the deities to a temporary site during construction.

The upcoming temple complex is designed to include expanded facilities to serve both religious and community functions. Plans indicate the inclusion of a multi-storey ancillary building housing a meditation hall, administrative offices, kitchen facilities, staff quarters, and parking spaces. The architectural design is also expected to incorporate stained glass panels depicting scenes from the Ramayana, allowing natural light into the interior spaces.

The redevelopment aims to accommodate the growing number of devotees in nearby residential areas such as Tampines, Pasir Ris, and Simei. Upon completion, the new temple is expected to continue the temple’s tradition of housing both Vaishnavite and Saivite deities, as well as shrines for non-Hindu figures such as Buddha and Guan Yin, reflecting Singapore’s multicultural religious landscape.

The new temple development is anticipated to be completed around 2030, after which religious activities will fully transition from the temporary premises to the new complex.

== Buddhist worship ==
The temple also caters to Buddhist devotees. Statues of Buddha and Guan Yin (Goddess of Mercy) have been set up for non-Hindu devotees who frequent the temple.

== See also ==
- List of Hindu temples in Singapore
