= Sri Rama Temple, Ramapuram =

Sree Rama Temple, Ramapuram
- Sree Rama Temple, Ramapuram, Malappuram, Kerala

Religion
- Affiliation: Hinduism
- District: Malappuram
- Deity: Rama
- Festival: Rama Navami

Location
- Location: Ramapuram
- State: Kerala
- Country: India
- Interactive map of Sree Rama Temple, Ramapuram
- Coordinates: 10.998071°N 76.140875°E

Specifications
- Temple: One
- Elevation: 54.39 m (178 ft)

Sree Rama temple, Ramapuram is a Hindu temple situated at Ramapuram, between Malappuram and Perinthalmanna in Kerala state, India. The temple is dedicated to the god Rama. There are shrines for Ganapathi, Sastha and Hanuman too in this temple.

== See also ==
- Temples of Kerala
