= Sri Darma Muneeswaran Temple =

Darma Muneeswaran Temple
- Location in Singapore

Religion
- Affiliation: Hinduism
- Deity: Muneeswarar

Location
- Location: 17 Serangoon North Avenue 1, Singapore 555894
- Country: Singapore
- Coordinates: 1°22′6.6″N 103°52′11.64″E

Architecture
- Type: Dravidian architecture

Website
- https://www.dmt.org.sg/

Darma Muneeswaran Temple is a Hindu temple located at 17 Serangoon North Avenue 1, Singapore. Established around 1900, the temple is dedicated to Lord Darma Muneeswaran, a form of the Hindu deity Shiva. It also houses shrines dedicated to several other Hindu deities and conducts religious, educational and cultural activities.

== History ==
The temple originated around 1900 as a small shrine beneath a Bodhi tree in the former Kampong Hwi Yoh area. It was established by approximately 30 Indian families living nearby, many of whom were involved in cattle rearing. The shrine consisted of an inscribed granite stone and a trident dedicated to Lord Darma Muneeswaran, who was worshipped as a guardian deity.

During the 1930s, residents reportedly experienced visions of Lord Darma Muneeswaran. Following these accounts, community leaders, including Pitchai Pillai and Allagappan Konnar of the Sembawang Rubber Estate, arranged for improvements to the shrine.

In 1969, additional deities were installed, including Sri Mariamman, Sri Vinayagar, Sri Murugan, Sri Nagar and Sri Bairavar. Temporary structures were constructed to house the deities.

The temple was officially registered as the Darma Muneeswaran Temple Society in 1980. With assistance from Dr Lau Teik Soon, then Member of Parliament for Serangoon Gardens, the temple obtained a Temporary Occupation Licence backdated to 1 May 1955.

== Reconstruction and Consecration ==
On 23 September 1989, the temple society approved plans to construct a new temple complex to accommodate its growing congregation and provide additional facilities.

In 1995, the society secured a 30-year lease for the existing site and adjoining land. Construction of the new complex began on 11 May 1998, following a groundbreaking ceremony on 1 May 1998.

The new temple complex, constructed at a cost of approximately S$3.5 million, was consecrated during its first Maha Kumbhabishegam on 11 June 2000. The building incorporated traditional Hindu architectural elements while retaining the original Bodhi tree. Sculptural works were undertaken under the direction of S. Nagarajan Sthapathiyar, while the consecration ceremonies were led by Dr K. Pitchai Gurukkal.

In 2012, the temple began another phase of upgrading works, including the construction of an additional basement and improvements to its existing facilities. The project, costing approximately S$2 million, was completed in 2013.

The second Maha Kumbhabishegam was held on 1 May 2013, following the completion of the renovation works.

The temple held its third Maha Kumbhabishegam on Friday, 1 May 2026. The main consecration ceremony took place between 9:30 am and 10:30 am, followed by a Maha Abishegam for Lord Darma Muneeswaran and Sri Mariamman at 5:30 pm. Preparatory Yaaga Poojais were conducted in the days preceding the ceremony.

== Deities and Religious Practices ==
The temple's principal deity is Lord Darma Muneeswaran, a form of Shiva traditionally associated with protection and guardianship.

Other deities worshipped at the temple include Sri Vinayagar (Ganesha), Sri Murugan, Sri Mariamman, Sri Nagar and Sri Bairavar. The temple also contains representations of Rama, Sita, Lakshmana and Hanuman.

A prominent feature of the temple is its large Nāga statue, representing the serpent deity in Hindu tradition. Devotees conduct prayers and special pujas associated with Kala Sarpa Dosha, a concept in Hindu astrology. The Navagraha sanctum, dedicated to the nine celestial deities, is situated behind the Nāga statue.

The original trident remains at the Bodhi tree, while the granite stone from the earliest shrine is preserved beneath the present statue of Lord Darma Muneeswaran.

== Community and Educational Activities ==
In addition to religious activities, Darma Muneeswaran Temple organises educational, cultural and community programmes.

Since 2003, the temple has distributed more than S$500,000 in educational bursaries, benefiting approximately 1,600 students from different ethnic and religious backgrounds, according to its historical records.

The temple also established the Munneru! programme, which provides educational enrichment activities and recognises students for academic and sporting achievements. Academic and sports excellence awards were introduced in 2010.

In the same year, the temple established the DMT Music and Dance Academy to provide instruction in Indian performing arts, including music and dance.

The temple conducts religious festivals, special prayers and community events throughout the year.
