= Paloli Mohammed Kutty =

Indian politician and social worker

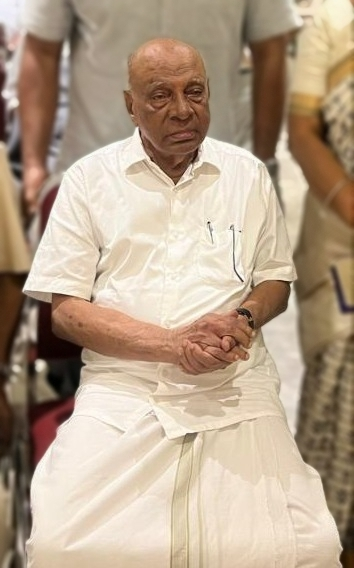

Minister for Local Administration, Kerala
- In office 18 May 2006 – 16 May 2011
- Chief Minister: V. S. Achuthanandan
- Preceded by: Kutty Ahammed Kutty
- Succeeded by: M. K. Muneer
- In office 20 May 1996 – 13 May 2001
- Chief Minister: E. K. Nayanar
- Preceded by: P.K.K. Bava
- Succeeded by: Cherkalam Abdullah

Member of the Kerala Legislative Assembly
- In office 2006–2011
- Preceded by: M. P. Gangadharan
- Succeeded by: P. Sreeramakrishnan
- Constituency: Ponnani
- In office 1996–2001
- Preceded by: E. K. Imbichi Bava
- Succeeded by: M. P. Gangadharan
- Constituency: Ponnani
- In office 1967–1970
- Preceded by: E. P. Gopalan
- Succeeded by: K. K. S. Thangal
- Constituency: Perinthalmanna

Personal details
- Born: 11 November 1931 (age 94) Kodur, Malappuram district, Kerala, India
- Party: Communist Party of India (Marxist)
- Spouse: Khadeeja
- Children: Two sons two daughters

Paloli Mohammed Kutty (born 11 November 1931) is an Indian politician, social worker, the former Minister for Local Administration in the Government of Kerala and a member of both State and Central Committee of Communist Party of India (Marxist). He was also served as Convenor of Left Democratic Front from 2001 to 2006. He represented the Ponnani constituency in Malappuram district in the Kerala Legislative Assembly from 2006 to 2011.

== Career ==
Mohammed Kutty was born on 11 November 1931 at Kodur near Malappuram, Kerala. After school education, he became a member of the Communist Party of India in 1951. During the course of a long political career, he has served at different times as Member of District Committee of CPI (M), Palakkad, District Secretary of CPI (M), Malapuram. He actively participated in the farmers movements in Kerala. He also served as State Secretary and President of Kerala Karshaka Sangham, farmers' wing of the CPI (M). He was president, Puzhakkattiri Panchayat during 1964 and Director of Kerala State Financial Enterprise during 1987–91. A pioneer in the "library movement" in Malabar area, he served also as the Director of Desabhimani Printing and Publishing Company, Kozhikode. Like many of his communist colleagues in Kerala, Paloli led an underground life for 16 months during the emergency period.

Mohammed Kutty's first electoral victory came in 1965 from Mankada constituency. He was then elected to the third Kerala Legislative Assembly in 1967 from Perinthalmanna Assembly constituency, as a CPI (M) member. After a long gap, he was again elected in 1996 to the 10th KLA contesting from Ponnani constituency. He served as the Minister for Local Administration in the Ministry headed by E. K. Nayanar & V.S. Achuthanandan during 1996–2001 and 2006-2011 respectively.

== See also ==
- Kerala Council of Ministers
