= Toa Payoh Vairavimada Kaliamman Temple =

Sri Vairavimada Kaliamman Temple
- Vairavimada Kaliamman Temple, Toa Payoh, Singapore

Religion
- Affiliation: Hinduism
- Deity: Kaliamman

Location
- Location: 2001 Lorong 8 Toa Payoh, Singapore 319259
- Country: Singapore
- Coordinates: 1.3350°N 103.8591°E

Architecture
- Type: Dravidian architecture
- Completed: 1860; 166 years ago

Specifications
- Temple: One
- Elevation: 7.18 m (24 ft)

Sri Vairavimada Kaliamman Temple is an Amman temple at Toa Payoh in Singapore. The presiding deity in this temple is Kaliamman. This temple is one of the three best temples in Toa Payoh. This temple was built by the Tamil Speaking Community

== Temple details ==
In the year 1860, this temple was established as a very small temple at the junction of Killiney Road and Orchard Road in Singapore. Later in the year 1921, due to traffic regulations, the temple was reconstructed on Somerset Road. And again in the year 1982, the temple was reconstructed at the present place in Toa Payoh. In the month of March 1986, the kumbhabhishekham (consecration) of the temple was performed.

This temple is of the importance that introduced the first pre-school in Singapore viz., Saraswathi Kindergarten.

== Location ==
This temple is located with the coordinates of (1.3350°N 103.8591°E) in Toa Payoh in Singapore.

Toa Payoh Vairavimada Kaliamman Temple (Singapore)

== Festivals ==
Brahmotsava, Chitra Poornima, Periyachi puja, Sandal kumbha abhishek and Makara Deepam are the important festivals celebrated in this temple.

== Sub deities ==
Durga, Vinayaka, Murugan, Ayyappan, Guruvayurappan, Angala Parameswari, Periyachi and Madurai Veeran are the sub deities in this temple.
