= Vadakkangara =

- village
- Location in Kerala, India Vadakkangara (India)
- Coordinates: 11°1′20.019″N 76°8′20.586″E
- Country: India
- State: Kerala
- District: Malappuram

Population (2011)
  - Total: 18,702

Languages
  - Official: Malayalam, English
- Time zone: UTC+5:30 (IST)
- PIN: 679324
- Vehicle registration: KL-53

Vadakkangara is a village in Malappuram district in the state of Kerala, India. It is located 9 km (5.6 mi) southeast of the district headquarters Malappuram.

== Education ==
The literacy rate of the village is maintained high through the literacy drive of Kerala Literacy Mission. The main educational institute is Thangal Secondary School (TSS), Vadakkangara.

== Economy ==
The economy encompasses traditional village farming, small scale business and the foreign money. The main crops cultivated are Coconut, Tapioca, Areca nut, banana, paddy.

== Demographics ==
As of 2011 India census, Vadakkangara had a population of 18702 with 8920 males and 9782 females. As of 2001 India census, Vadakkangara had a population of 15934 with 7739 males and 8195 females.

== Culture ==
Vadakkangara village is a predominantly Muslim populated area. Hindus exist in comparatively smaller numbers. So the culture of the locality is based upon Muslim traditions. Duff Muttu, Kolkali and Aravanamuttu are common folk arts of this locality. There are many libraries attached to mosques giving a rich source of Islamic studies. Most of the books are written in Arabi-Malayalam which is a version of the Malayalam language written in Arabic script. People gather in mosques for the evening prayer and continue to sit there after the prayers discussing social and cultural issues. Business and family issues are also sorted out during these evening meetings. The Hindu minority of this area keeps their rich traditions by celebrating various festivals in their temples. Hindu rituals are done here with a regular devotion like other parts of Kerala.

== Transportation ==
Vadakkangara village connects to other parts of India through Malappuram town. NH 66 passes through Kottakkal and the northern stretch connects to Goa and Mumbai. The southern stretch connects to Cochin and Trivandrum. NH 966 connects to Palakkad and Coimbatore. The nearest airport is at Kozhikode. The nearest major railway station is at Tirur.
