= P. Nandakumar =

Indian politician

P. Nandakumar is an Indian politician who served as the MLA of Ponnani Constituency from May 2021 to May 2026. Nandakumar is a prominent Kerala state leader of Communist Party of India (Marxist).
