= Panangangara, Malappuram =

Panangangara
- Place
- Country: India
- State: Kerala
- District: Malappuram

Government
  - Body: panchayath

Languages
  - Official: Malayalam, English
- Time zone: UTC+5:30 (IST)
- Postal code: 679321

Panangangara is a place located at 8.5 km from Malappuram city, on National Highway-213 (old Mangalore-Madras Trunk Road) towards Palakkad. The Malappuram showrooms of both TOYOTA, NISSAN, KIA and SCODA are located at Panangangara.
