= Indian Singaporeans =

Ethnic group

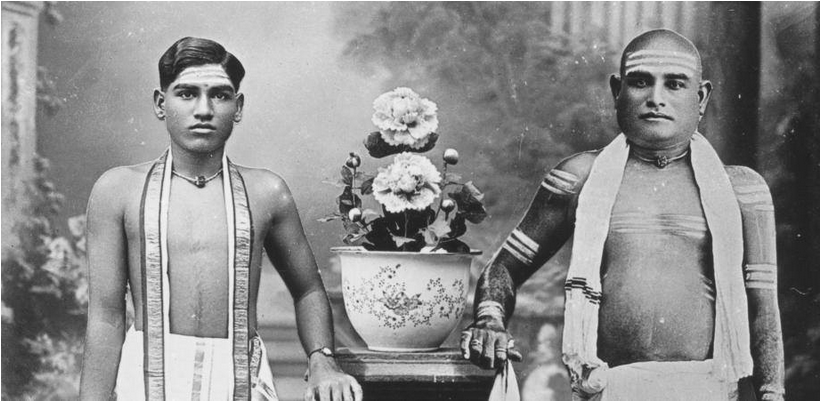
- Chettiar financiers in Singapore, circa 1920

Total population
- Indian as per National Registration Identity Card; 362,274; 9.0% of the Singapore resident (Note: In Singapore, the term "resident" refers to both citizens and permanent residents (PRs).) population (2020)

Regions with significant populations
- Singapore

Languages
- Majority: English; Singlish; Tamil/Malay Tamil; Minority: Malay Chetty; Telugu; Malayalam; Punjabi; Bengali; Sindhi; Gujarati; Hindi-Urdu; Kannada; Malay; others

Religion
- Hinduism; Islam; Christianity; Sikhism; Buddhism; Jainism; Zoroastrianism

Related ethnic groups
- Singapore Tamils; Malaysian Indians; Chitty; Indians; Indian diaspora; Tamil Malaysians; Malaysian Telugus; Malaysian Malayali; Malaysian Gujaratis; Tamils; Telugus; Malayalis; Kannadigas; Tamil diaspora; Telugu diaspora; Malayali diaspora; Indians in South Africa; Indian diaspora in Southeast Africa; Indo-Caribbeans; Indo-Mauritians; Indo-Fijians; Sri Lankan Tamil; Burmese Tamils; Tamil Mauritians; South Indians in Fiji; Punjabis; Gujaratis; Sindhis; Punjabi diaspora; Sindhi diaspora; Gujarati diaspora; Chindians; Jawi Peranakan; Eurasians in Singapore

Indian Singaporeans are Singaporeans of Indian or broader South Asian ancestry. As of the 2020 census, they constitute approximately 9.0% of the country's residents, representing the third largest ethnic group in Singapore. In Singapore, "Indian" is an umbrella term defined in both geographical and cultural contexts as pertaining to South Asia and bears no necessary relation to the contemporary Republic of India. Some Singaporeans of South Asian ancestry would simply just consider themselves "Singaporean", viewing themselves as distinct from the "India Indians" in terms of culture, identity and social reality.

Early Indian settlement was largely transient, composed primarily of male workers and soldiers. By the mid-20th century, however, the community had become more established, exhibiting a balanced gender ratio and a diversified age distribution. This period marked the emergence of a cohesive Indian Singaporean identity within the evolving social fabric of the island.

Indian Singaporeans are linguistically and religiously heterogeneous, with ethnic Tamils forming about half of the community. Over two centuries, Indian Singaporean culture has evolved distinctly from contemporary South Asian cultures, with its elements increasingly integrated into the broader Singaporean culture, alongside influences from the Chinese and Malay communities. Individuals of Indian descent have historically contributed prominently to national life, with representation in politics, education, diplomacy, law and sports.

== Definition of Indian Singaporeans ==
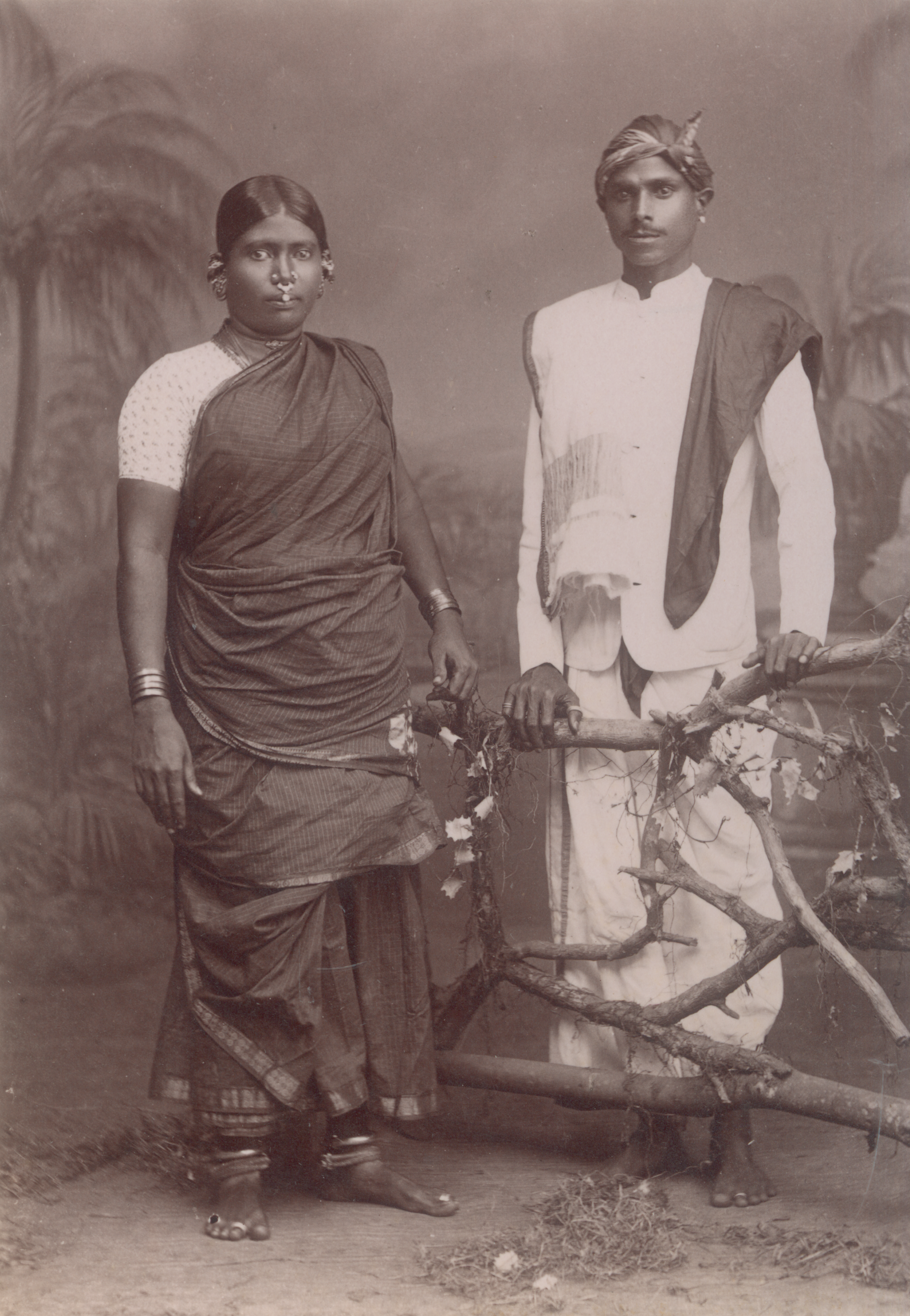
An Indian couple in Singapore, circa 1890.

The Singapore Department of Statistics broadly defines "Indian" as a "race" or "ethnic group", comprising "persons of Indian, Pakistani, Bangladeshi or Sri Lankan origin such as Tamils, Telugus, Malayalis, Punjabis, Bengalis and Sinhalese, etc."

In Singapore, the Indian population can be defined by nationality and residency status. Most ethnic Indians are Singaporeans or permanent residents, commonly referred to as "Indian Singaporean" or "local Indians". They range from second to fifth generation descendants of migrants from South Asia, many of whom retain minimal or negligible connections to the region and consider its contemporary nations as foreign. Foreign citizens of the Republic of India are generally termed "Indian nationals" or informally "Indian Indians". Foreign Indians can also be differentiated by their residency status. For instance, a significant proportion are ethnic South Asian immigrant workers in Singapore.

Demographic statistics are generally restricted to "Singapore residents", defined as both Singaporean citizens and permanent residents. Many of the statistics about Indians in Singapore in this article are restricted to this group. Scholars have noted, "(o)fficial figures for workers on temporary contracts are difficult to obtain because the Ministry of Manpower in Singapore considers the information sensitive." Consequently, there is limited information about short-term or 'non-resident' Indians in Singapore. Note that use of the term 'non-resident' Indian should not be confused with the concept of the Non Resident Indian or NRI, which the government of the Republic of India uses to describe its citizens living abroad. In Singapore, an NRI may be statistically non-resident (in the case of work permit or pass holders) or they may be considered a Singapore resident (in the case of permanent residents).

== Ethno-linguistic profile of Indian Singaporeans ==
Indian Singaporeans are grouped according to their respective ethnolinguistic backgrounds in the Indian subcontinent or 'dialect group'. Most Indians in Singapore have ancestral links to Southern India and Sri Lanka, with substantial groups from Northern India and Western India accounting for most of the remainder. These are generally the descendants of both free and indentured settlers from India during the 19th and early half of the 20th century.

In 2010, the Singapore census categorised 237,473 Singaporeans and 110,646 permanent residents into a number of 'dialect' groups. However, these groups included Sikhs, who are an ethnoreligious rather than linguistic group. Virtually all of the Sikhs are Punjabi, which was also captured as a separate 'dialect' category (comprising mainly Hindu Punjabis). Given their small absolute and relative numbers, the following table adapts the 2010 census data by combining the 'Sikh' (12,952) and 'Punjabi' (5,672) category under 'Punjabi'.

The percentages in the table refer to the proportion of each language group within the larger Resident Indian community in Singapore.

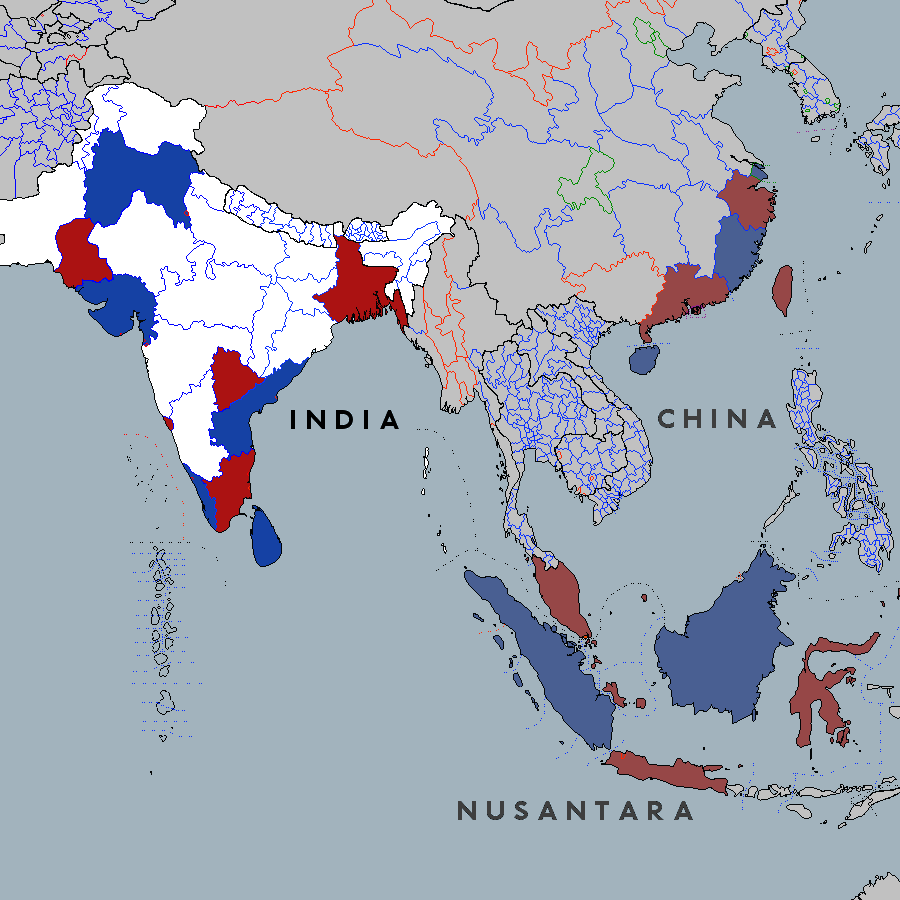
This clickable map depicts the ethno-linguistic backgrounds of the majority of Indian Singaporeans. Click on the regional subdivisions to see the name of a state, province or region. (Note: This map depicts India as an undivided entity before the partition in 1947, because some Indian Singaporeans trace their roots to regions that now fall outside the Republic of India.) (Note: The map also includes other countries in the Indian Subcontinent, as 'Indian Singaporean' a broad term that encompasses various South Asian ethnicities that fall outside India proper, like the Sri Lankan Tamils.)

Population Profile of Singapore Indian Dialect Groups (Residential population; Singaporeans and permanent residents)
Ethno-linguistic background	Ancestral origin	2010 census	Percentage
Tamil	Tamil Nadu; Sri Lanka; Puducherry	188,591	54.18%
Malayali	Kerala; Lakshadweep	26,348	7.57%
Punjabi	Punjab	18,624	5.35%
Gujarati	Gujarat	4,124	1.18%
Sindhi	Sindh	3,971	1.14%
Sinhalese	Sri Lanka	3,140	0.90%
Telugu; Bengali; Hindustani; Indo-Portuguese (Kristang); Parsi; Other or Mixed (Note: Singaporeans of heritage must identify with their paternal ethnic group under Singaporean law.)	Andhra Pradesh; Telangana; Bengal; Goa; Various	103,321	29.68%
		348,119	100%

The Singaporean Indian demographic is characterised by an ethnic Tamil majority (54.18%) and a large number of smaller groups. Ethnic Tamils in Singapore include the descendants of Tamil settlers from India and Sri Lanka (sometimes referred to as 'Ceylonese'). Ethnic Malayalees, tracing their heritage to Kerala in southern India, form the second largest community, making up 7.57% of the local Indian population. Tamils and Malayalees are the two main South Indian ethnolinguistic communities in Singapore, forming two-thirds of the Indian population. Meanwhile, the three main North Indian ethnolinguistic groups in Singapore (the Punjabi, Gujarati, and Sindhi communities) constitute 7.67% of the Singaporean Indian populace. The remaining 29.68% is composed of many smaller groups with ancestry from both southern India (such as the Telugus) and northern India (such as the Hindustanis, the Malay colloquial term for Hindi-speaking Indians), or ethnically mixed Singaporeans with paternal Indian ancestry.

== History ==
=== Pre-colonial period ===
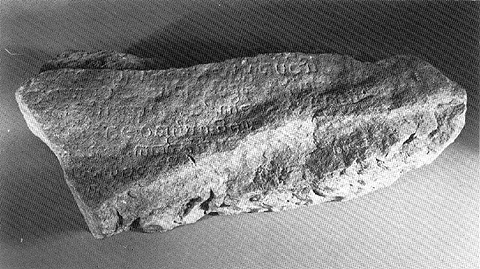
A fragment of the Singapore Stone, inscribed with an Indic script, c 10th to 13th century.

Ancient India exerted a profound influence over Southeast Asia through trade, religious missions, wars and other forms of contact. Pre-colonial Singapore was part of 'Indianised Kingdoms' like Srivijaya and the Majapahit, which formed part of a cultural region known as Greater India.

Prior to the spread of Islam, Singapore and the rest of the Malay world were Hindu-Buddhist. One of the most extensive and enduring Indian influences on Malay culture is the vast number of Indian loan words in the Malay language.

Indian influence is also seen in symbols and mythology associated with ancient Singapore. The Sejarah Melayu or Malay Annals describe the Indian prince who founded Singapore – Sang Nila Utama – as being a descendant of Alexander the Great and an Indian Princess. Meanwhile, the royal and sacred associations of Fort Canning Hill, the seat of ancient rulers, are related to the Hindu Mount Meru concept.

Archaeological digs have unearthed Hindu-Buddhist artefacts from the pre-colonial period. In 1822, John Crawfurd documented the ruins of a Hindu or Buddhist temple on Fort Canning Hill. Singapore's two most important pre-colonial artefacts are the Singapore Stone, which is inscribed with an Indic script and a gold armlet bearing the motif of a Hindu 'kala' head.

=== Colonial period: 1820s–1950s ===
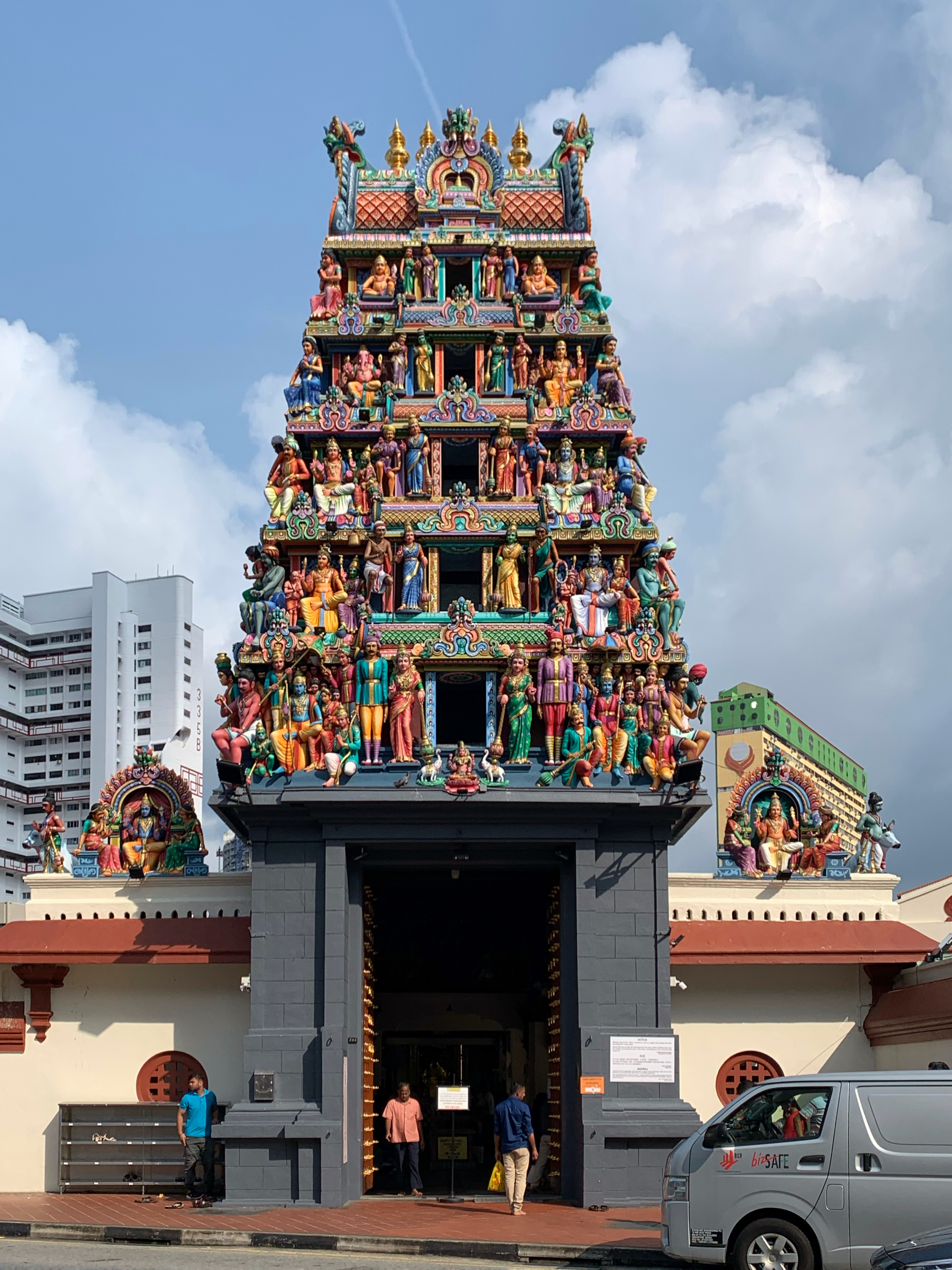
Founded in 1827, Sri Mariamman Temple is Singapore's oldest Hindu temple.

==== Migration and settlement ====
Following the Portuguese colonisation of Malacca (Malaysia) in 1511, the Portuguese government encouraged their explorers to bring their married Indian women who were converted already to Roman Catholic Christianity, under a policy set by Afonso de Albuquerque, then Viceroy of India. These people were Goan Catholics (Konkani Catholics) and Bombay East Indians (Catholics of Marathi descent). Kuparis, who were of mixed Samvedic Brahmin, Goan and Portuguese descent also arrived. Sinhalese and their children from Portuguese that include Portuguese Burghers from Portuguese Ceylon also came later. Their children are already intermarried with the Malay population, losing their ethnic identities. Indian contact was rekindled from 1819 to World War II, when both India and Singapore were under British colonial rule. Unlike earlier forms of contact, this led to mass migration and, eventually, the formation of a large, settled and distinct population. By 1824, Singapore's first census counted 756 Indian residents, or about 7% of the total population. In 1826, official figures give a total population of 13,750, of which 1,021 are Indians – 244 from Bengal and 777 from the Coromandel Coast, most of whom were males.

Initially, Indian immigrants were predominantly adult men who came from India to find work, serve military duties or serve prison sentences for several years before returning home. There was a constant flow of Indians in and out of the city, keeping the local community fairly transient. A minority of Indians were also wealthy merchants who settled in Singapore and built local commercial and social institutions. Best known amongst them was Naraina Pillai, the earliest Indian community leader and the island's first building contractor. In 1827, he also founded the Sri Mariamman Temple, Singapore's oldest Hindu place of worship.

The influx of Indians in the half century after 1819 led to a brief period when Indians, for the only time, overtook the Malays to become the second largest ethnic group. In 1860, they formed 16% of the population. However, their number then fell from 13,000 that year to 12,000 in 1880, or 8.7% of the population. Following this, Indians slowly began to settle permanently in greater numbers and the relative size of the community in colonial Singapore became stable, fluctuating between 7.7% and 9.4%.

==== Social characteristics ====
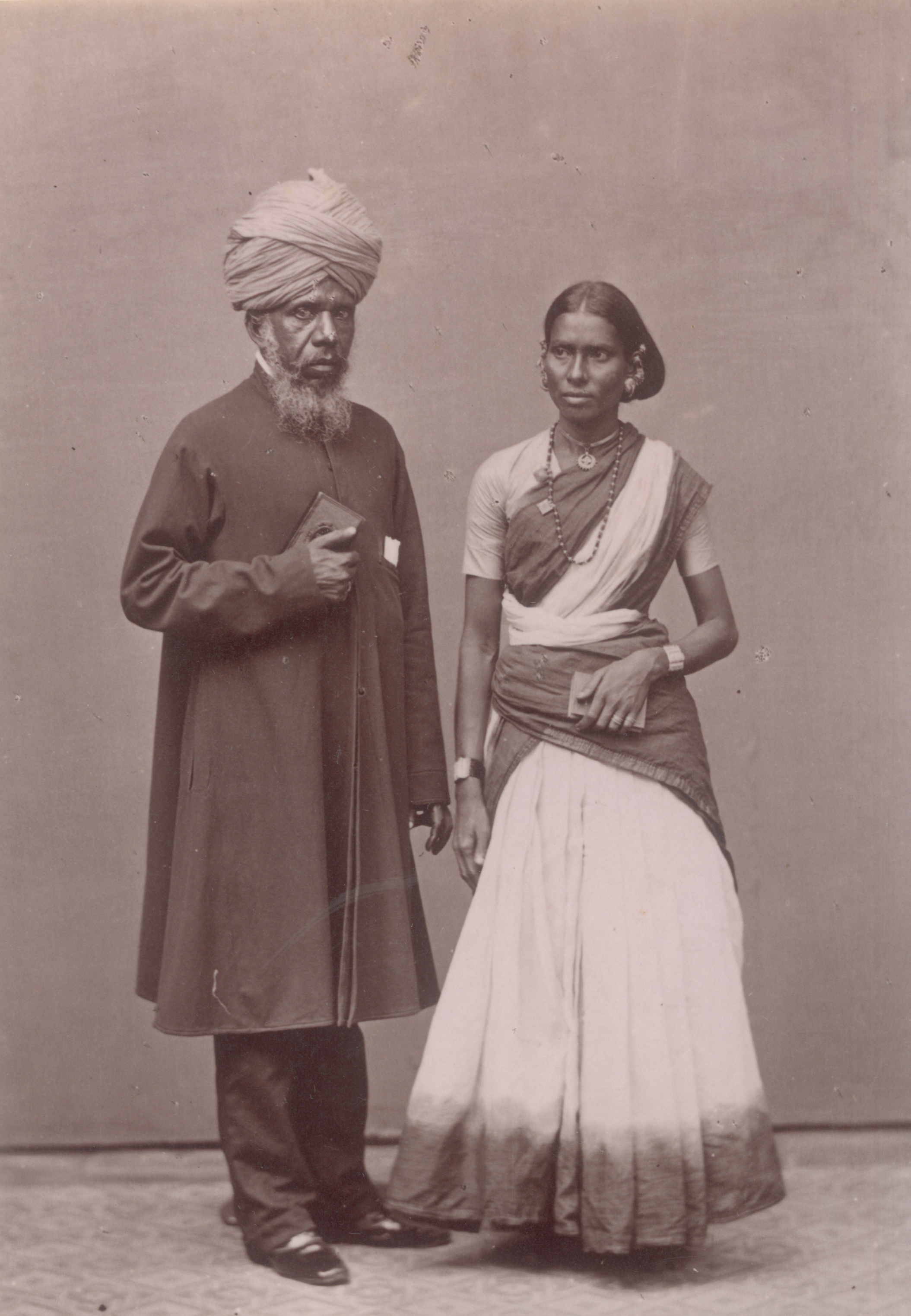
An Indian-Muslim couple in Singapore, circa 1890.

Scholars have characterised the Indian community in colonial times as being diverse and highly stratified along class lines. According to Dr Rajesh Rai, the social hierarchy comprised four main groups: the educated professional elite (over 0.5% of the Indian community), mercantile groups (under 10%), the white collar middle class (5–7%) and the uneducated labourers (over 80%).

Economic class and job functions were also aligned with the ethnic origins of immigrants. For example, Sri Lankan Tamils and Malayalees formed the core of the English educated upper middle class. Mercantile families tended to be Sindhi, Gujarati, and Tamil Muslim. South Indian upper caste Hindus tended to perform traditional skilled jobs, such as moneylenders (Chettiars) and priests (Brahmins). Sikhs were often policemen or private security guards. Most of these migrants were voluntary migrants who entered and left Singapore freely on their own resources. Unskilled coolies tended to be landless Tamil peasants from the Shudra caste as well as Adi Dravidas or 'Untouchables'. These were often indentured labourers who were brought through various labour recruitment systems to work on rubber plantations in Malaya. Many later came to work in Singapore once free of their bonds. Another group that was less than free was the military. The first Indians in Singapore were 120 sepoys in the Bengal Native Infantry and a 'bazaar contingent' of washermen, servants and others who came with Stamford Raffles on his first visit in 1819. Throughout the colonial period, military personnel came from all over India. Most returned home after their service without settling in Singapore.

Finally, there were the convicts. In the 19th century, the British shipped Indian convicts to Singapore to relieve overcrowded Indian jails. These men (and some women) were used as labour to build public buildings and roads in Singapore. Like the sepoys, they came from all parts of India. While some returned to India, several settled in Singapore after serving their sentences.

==== Social reform movements ====
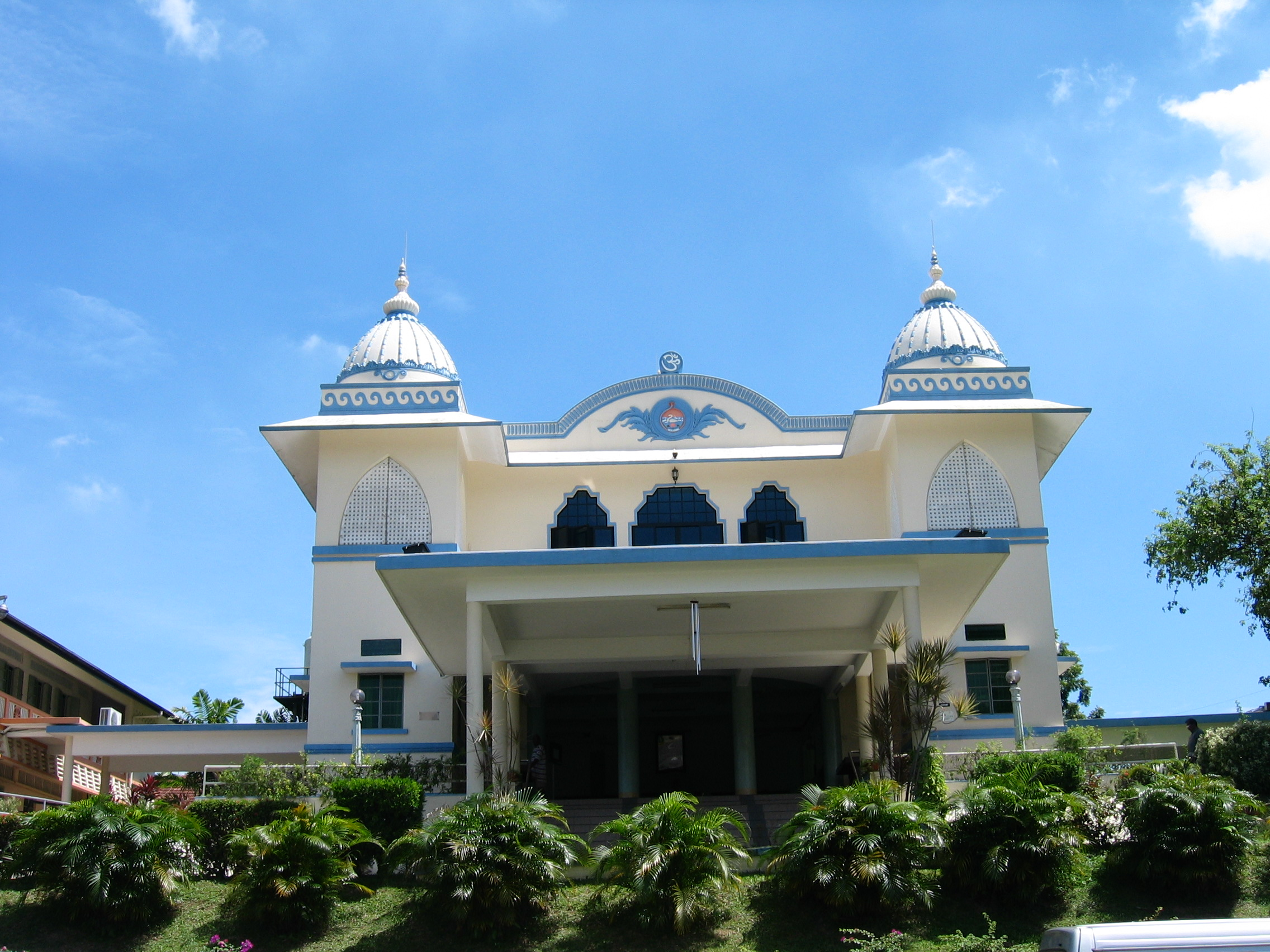
Ramakrishna Mission, Singapore.

From the 19th century, Hindu reform movements emerged in India as part of a broader cultural modernisation. These movements sought to promote what they saw as a more authentic form of Hinduism while addressing social abuses, such as the Hindu caste system. These movements spread to overseas Indian communities, including Singapore. Groups like the Ramakrishna Mission, Arya Samaj and Sree Narayana Mission were active conduits of this reform movement. Traditional religious practices, especially among lower caste Hindus, centred around various rural folk traditions, esoteric rituals and superstitions. In contrast, the new movement appealed to better educated urban Hindus by conducting religious education classes for children and adults and interpreting the values, concepts and principles behind the religion for lay people. These groups also encouraged a more direct relationship with God, unmediated by Brahmin priests and rituals, through individual devotion (stemming from the Bhakti movement), chanting Bhajans, or hymns, as well as through yoga. Charitable service was also promoted. The Ramakrishna Mission in Singapore set up a home for boys from troubled homes, while the Sree Narayana Mission set up a home for the destitute elderly.

Another social reform movement was the Self-Respect Movement, which emerged in Tamil Nadu in the 1920s to liberate Dravidian people, and especially Adi Dravidas and lower caste Tamils from what was seen as Brahmin oppression. This movement sought inspiration from Tamil history and culture. In Singapore, groups like the Tamil Reform Association were inspired by this movement. They imported publications from India that promoted the movement, and they also hosted visiting leaders of the Self-Respect Movement from Tamil Nadu when they visited Singapore. The Singapore groups focused on moral, social and religious reform. For example, they campaigned against caste distinctions and alcohol abuse. These groups also promoted the use of the Tamil language and the development of Tamil literature in Singapore through the establishment of Tamil newspapers and schools. They were also involved in the union activism, especially in those work sectors dominated by Tamils. Tamil-educated journalists and teachers were at the forefront of this movement. Leaders like Thamizhavel G. Sarangapani were especially instrumental in championing the rights of Tamils and Indians, by encouraging Indians to register for Singapore citizenship in the 1950s and by campaigning to make Tamil one of Singapore's official languages.

==== 1915 Singapore Mutiny ====
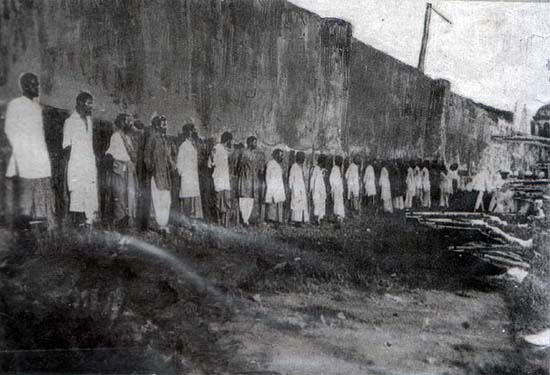
Sepoy mutineers awaiting execution in 1915.

The 1915 Singapore Mutiny, also known as the 1915 Sepoy Mutiny, was an incident concerning 850 Indian Army soldiers who mutinied against their British superiors on 15 February 1915 in Singapore, as part of the 1915 Ghadar Conspiracy (not to be mistaken for the Indian Mutiny of 1857). The predominantly Muslim soldiers mutinied because they believed they were being sent to fight against the Islamic Ottoman Empire as part of the Middle Eastern theatre of World War I. This mutiny lasted nearly seven days and resulted in the deaths of 47 soldiers and civilians at the hands of the mutineers, who were subsequently arrested and court-martialled; those who were found guilty of capital crimes were executed by the Singapore Volunteer Corps. In general, the mutiny was restricted to Muslim soldiers and did not involve the wider Indian population in Singapore. While the mutiny was a significant event in Singaporean history, and one of the most important ones specifically involving the Indian diaspora, it was somewhat distinct from the mainstream development of nationalist sentiments among the Indian population in Singapore, which emerged most prominently around the time of the Second World War.

==== Political movements ====
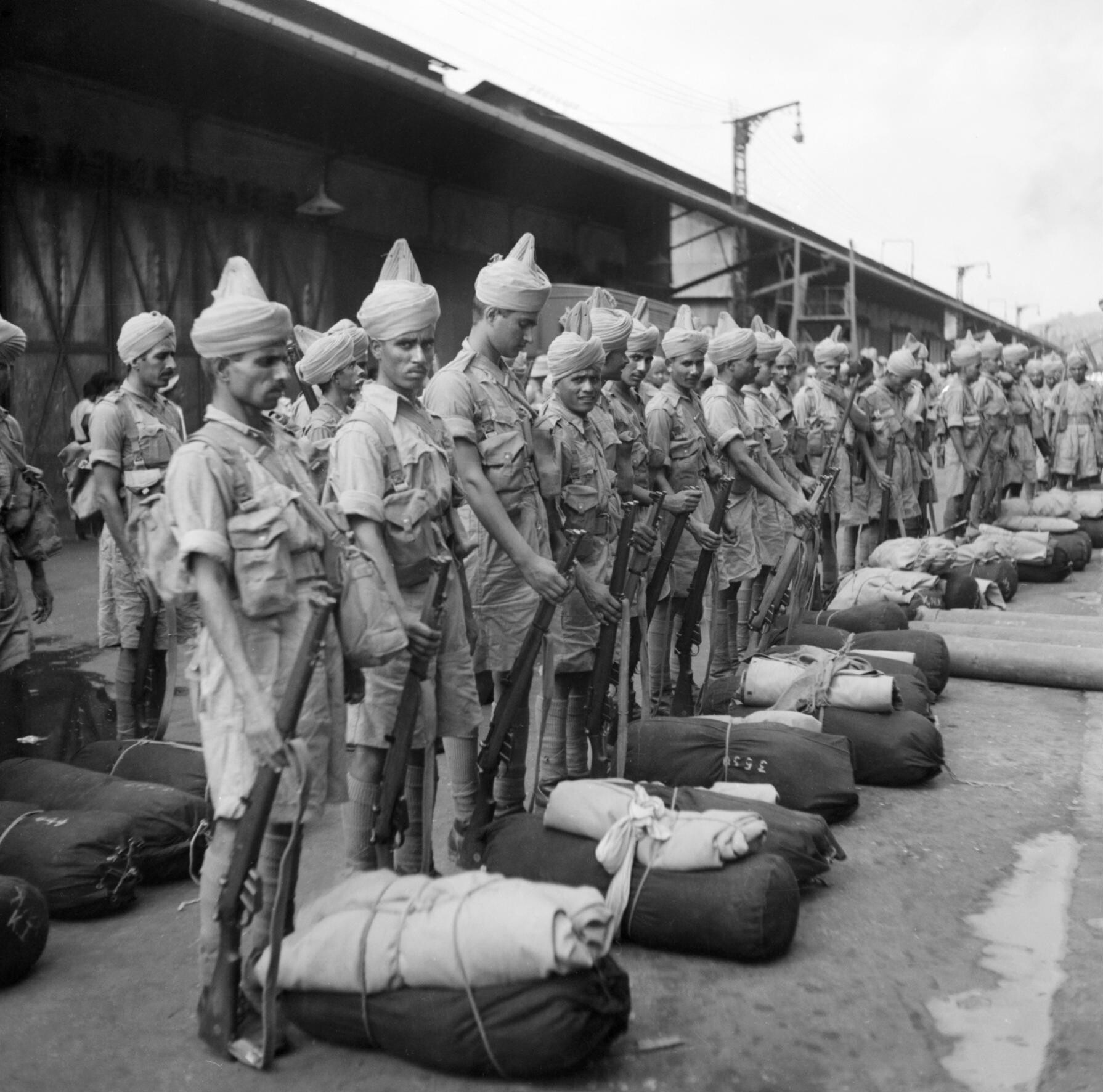
Indian troops in Singapore, 1941.

Nationalist movements in India established branch organisations in Singapore to draw on local Indian support for Indian independence. The Indian Independence League was a political organisation operated from the 1920s to the 1940s to organise those living outside of India to remove the British from India. Founded in 1928 by Indian nationalists Subhas Chandra Bose and Jawaharlal Nehru, the organisation was active in Singapore and Malaya following Japan's successful Malayan Campaign in the Second World War.

The Indian National Army (INA) was an armed force formed by Indian nationalists in 1942 in Southeast Asia, also during World War II. Their aim was to overthrow the British Raj in colonial India, with Japanese assistance. Many Indian soldiers and civilians were recruited in Singapore and Malaya to join the INA during the Japanese occupation. Many of them died fighting alongside the Japanese against the British in Burma during the war.

Indian nationalist sentiments in Singapore and Malaya were paralleled by the rise of Chinese nationalism amongst the overseas Chinese in these territories. As these colonies progressed towards independence, Indians and Chinese in Malaya organised themselves along the lines of ethnic political parties. For instance, the Indian Association in Singapore, today a social and recreational club, was one of a network of such clubs in early 20th century Malaya which came together to form what would become the Malaysian Indian Congress (MIC), the current ethnic Indian party within Malaysia's ruling Barisan National coalition government. Unlike Malaysia's delicate ethno-demographic balance, Singapore had a large Chinese majority. This rendered ethnic-based politics less viable and tended to support class-based politics instead. For example, several Indian professionals supported the more conservative pro-British parties, as they had been beneficiaries of the colonial system. In contrast, the ruling People's Action Party (PAP) espoused an ideology of social democracy which gained the support of Indian union workers. S. Rajaratnam was one of the founding members of the PAP, and he worked to define and champion its vision of a multi-racial country, in contrast to the Malaysian model.

More left-leaning Indian leaders and intellectuals, such as C.V. Devan Nair and James Puthucheary, initially supported more radically left-wing groups. They had been imprisoned by the British for their radical union activism. Later, some of these men join the more moderate wing of the PAP. Devan Nair went on to build the modern trades union movement in Singapore, the National Trades Union Congress. Consequently, Indians in Singapore tended to align themselves, both individually and as groups, with parties advocating specific political or economic ideologies, rather than along purely racial lines. This basic difference between the Indian communities of Singapore and Malaysia has endured to the present day.

=== Post-colonial history: 1960s – present ===
==== Immediate post-colonial period: 1960s – 1980s ====
Scholars have identified two phases in the development of the Indian community after Singapore's independence in 1965. The first phase, from 1965 to the early 1990s, saw a decline in the proportion of the community from 9% in 1957 to a low of 6.4% in 1980. One reason was the withdrawal of British military forces in the early 1970s, which led to the repatriation of many Indian base workers. Another factor was the retirement of older men, who chose to return to their families in India. Meanwhile, post-1965 immigration restrictions ended new migration from India. Furthermore, there was a rise in the emigration of Indian Singaporeans to the West in the late 1980s. During this time, the Indian population continued to grow in absolute terms due to natural increase. Even as it grew proportionally smaller, the community also became more settled, with several new generations born locally. A historical novel titled 'Sembawang: A Novel' explores this notion as well as traces the lives of Indian migrants who lived in an Indian enclave outside the HM Naval Base in the 1960s.

From the 1960s to 1980s, the People's Action Party government tried to cultivate a shared national identity and to end the historical tendency of Singaporeans to identify with the national – and often nationalistic – politics of their ancestral homelands. While different ethnic groups were allowed and sometimes encouraged to retain their cultural identities, they were also pushed to integrate socially, politically and economically across ethnic lines. The government pursued policies to integrate the races in public housing estates and national schools. Young men underwent two years of compulsory national service in ethnically mixed military or police camps. Traditional family businesses were superseded by government agencies or foreign multi-national corporations, which hired multi-ethnic workforces on the basis of meritocratic ability rather than kinship or ethnicity. Consequently, "the cultivation of a Singaporean identity has been largely successful in converting Indian migrants into Indian-Singaporeans." In general, Indian social patterns and political activities became aligned and integrated within the national mainstream from the 1960s.

Although the Singapore government championed public policies and a political discourse of racial integration and national identity, it came to recognise that important differences in the socio-economic profiles of the three main races continued to endure in the post-colonial period. Initially, it had set up Mendaki, a quasi-autonomous Malay community self-help group to promote educational advancement within that community to address underperformance by Malay students. In the 1980s, this approach – which was initially seen as an exceptional measure taken in the case of the Malay community – became entwined with the rhetoric of Asian values, which saw the promotion of a greater consciousness and pride in each citizen's own ethnic heritage, as a bulwark against the supposedly negative influence of Western culture. Consequently, the government established the Singapore Indian Development Association (SINDA) in 1991 to address the educational and social problems of the Indian community. Shortly after, a similar body was set up for the majority Chinese community.

Apart from ethnic self-help groups like SINDA (which remain controversial in Singapore), the government has, in the main, pursued policies emphasising racial integration and national identity. It is against this backdrop that immigration policies were liberalised in the 1990s, leading to an influx of foreigners in Singapore, particularly Indian nationals. This led to a new phase in the history of the Indian community in Singapore.

==== Contemporary period: 1990s – present ====
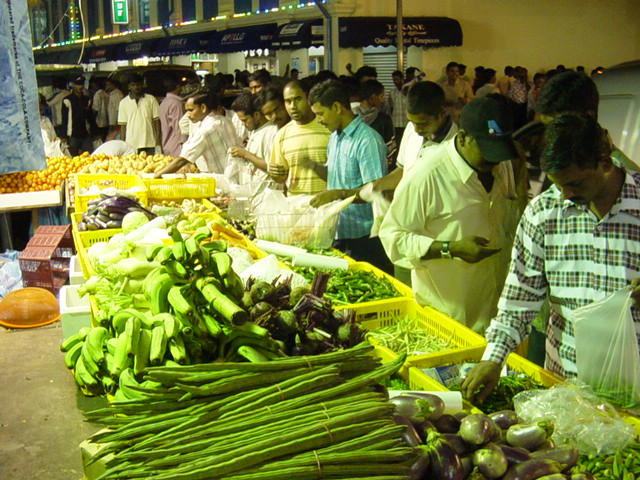
Foreign construction workers at Little India.

A second phase began in the early 1990s, when immigration policies were liberalised to attract foreign professionals to boost the size and skills of the local workforce. The government was keen to draw in well educated migrants from Asian countries who, it was hoped, would be both keen and able to settle permanently. This also addressed the problem of Singapore's extremely low fertility rates. In addition to these professionals, unskilled foreign workers were recruited as low cost manual labour for construction sites and the cleaning sector, albeit without the prospect of permanent settlement. As a result of these policies, the Indian population grew faster than other groups. The proportion of Indian citizens and permanent residents rose from 6.4% in 1980 to 9.23% in 2010. This was mainly due to rapid growth in the number of Indian nationals who acquired Singapore citizenship or permanent residency.

For some years now, the Department of Statistics has stopped providing ethnic data about the short-term or 'non-resident' foreign citizens living in Singapore (i.e. those without Singapore Permanent Residence). As of end June 2007, there were 1,005,500 such persons, or 21.5% of the total population. This group includes two-year work permit holders as well as those holding renewable Employment, Dependant and Student Passes. In 2005, Dr Rajesh Rai from the National University of Singapore has observed that "independent surveys approximate the number of South Asians on work permits to be… approximately 90,000–100,000." In November 2007, a cabinet minister said "more than 20,000 Indian professionals had set up home" in Singapore, although it is unclear if this referred only to Employment Pass holders, or if it included Permanent Residents, Student Pass and/or Dependant Pass holders. Based on these figures, the number of short-term or 'non-resident' Indians in Singapore in 2007 is likely to be in the region of 100,000. As such, the proportion of Indians in the total population is likely to range from 9% to 10% (suggesting 89,000 to 135,000 'non-resident' Indians).

The advance release figures from Singapore's 2010 Census show, for the first time, the number of ethnic Indian Singapore citizens, and ethnic Indian Singapore Permanent Residents, separately – instead of combining the two. As of 2010, there were 237,473 Indian Singapore citizens, or 7.35% of the citizen population. There were 110,646 Indian PRs, or 20.45% of the PR population. In total, ethnic Indians formed 348,119, or 9.23% of the 'resident' population of citizens and PRs.

=== In-depth studies ===
Several in-depth studies have been conducted and published in the recent years on the Indian communities in Singapore such as Rajesh Rai's, Indians in Singapore, 1819–1945: Diaspora in the Colonial Port City, Anitha Devi Pillai's, From Kerala to Singapore: Voices from the Singapore Malayalee Community, Mathew Mathews, The Singapore Ethnic Mosaic, S A Nathanji's Singapore: Nation Building and Indians' Legacy amongst others.

== Demographics ==
=== Income and education ===
DPS International School Singapore.

Alongside other ethnic groups, Indians from all social backgrounds have achieved significant advances in their educational levels, income, life expectancy and other social indicators. Singapore's extraordinary economic growth from the 1960s to 1990s lifted many out of poverty and created a broad middle class. In the process, many Indians experienced upward social mobility for the first time. Despite this progress, Indians remain somewhat stratified in terms of class relative to other ethnic groups. With the influx of highly qualified Indian Permanent Residents, the socio-economic indicators of the Indian community have improved, arguably masking the underachievement of some Indians. In 2005, both the average and median monthly income for Indian Residents (S$3,660 and $2,480, respectively) exceeded those for all Residents (S$3,500 and S$2,410, respectively). In the same year, 25% of Indian Residents had a university degree as their highest qualification attained. In contrast the national average was only 17%.

Other education statistics are less positive. In 2004, 73% of Indians among the Primary One cohort were admitted to a post-secondary institution, compared with 86% for the Chinese, and 75% for the Malays. In the same year, 73.7% of Indian students received 5 or more passes in the Singaporean GCE 'O' Level examinations, compared with 86.5% of Chinese students and 59.3% of Malays. Given their performance in the 'O' level examinations, it would appear Indians would have been under represented among students who sat for the 'A' level examination. However, those Indians who did reach the 'A' level and sat for this exam marginally outperformed the national average. 93% of Indians received 2 'A' and 2 'AO' level passes, compared with 92.6% among Chinese students, and 92.3% nationally. The socio-economic problems, and especially educational under-performance, facing Singapore Indians are addressed by the community through Singapore Indian Development Association (SINDA), the national self-help group for the Indian community.

Singapore has the following international schools for expatriate Indians:

- Global Indian International School Singapore
- DPS International School Singapore
- National Public School Singapore

=== Languages ===
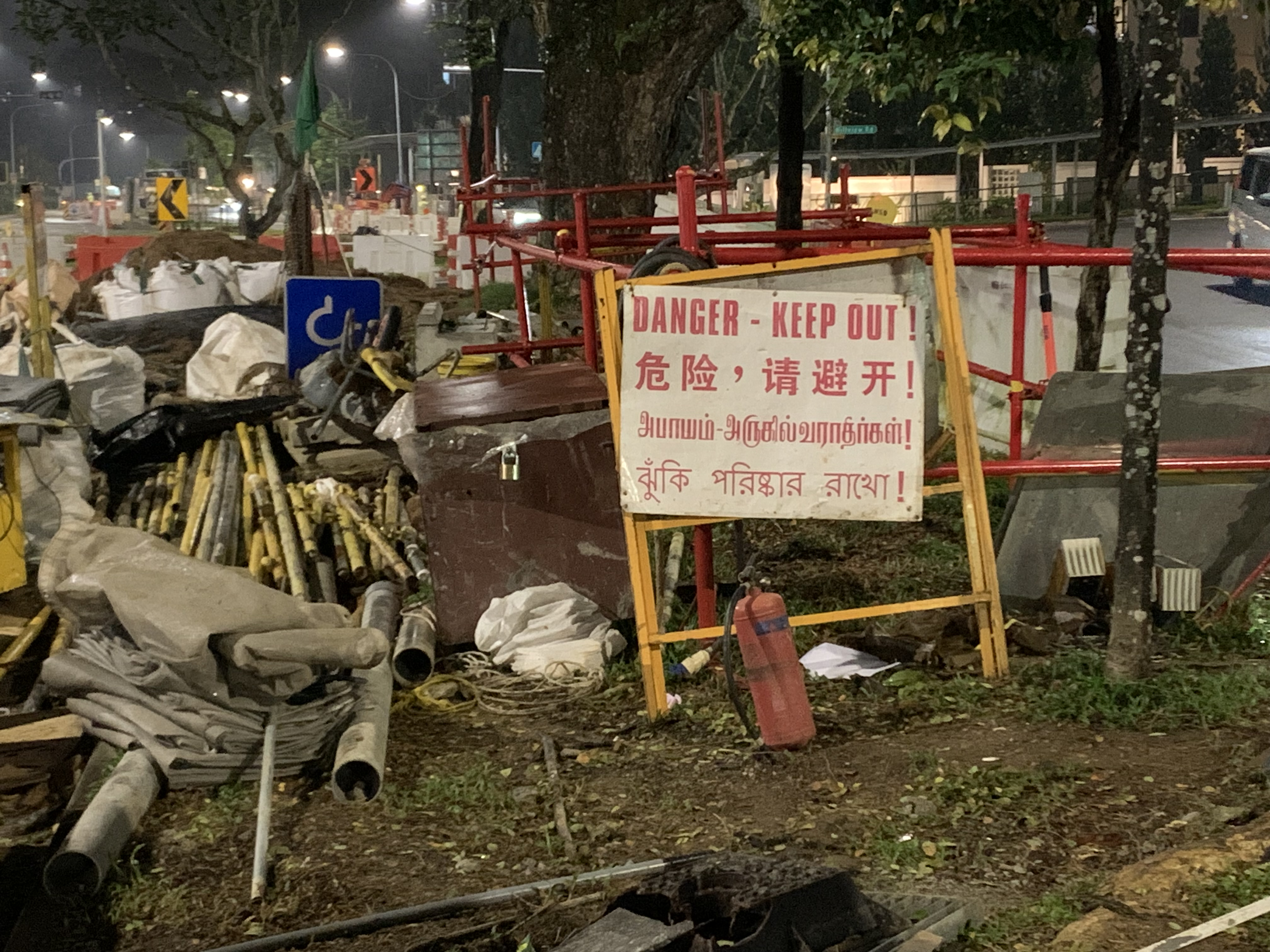
A "Danger-Keep Out" sign at a roadwork in Hillview showing four languages: English, Chinese (in Traditional Script), Tamil, and Bengali; the latter two languages are Indian

The official languages of Singapore are English, Malay, Chinese (Mandarin) and Tamil. The national language of Singapore is Malay for historical reasons, and it is used in the national anthem, "Majulah Singapura".

Persons of ethnic Tamil ancestry form about 58% of Singapore's Indian residents. Minority Indian groups include Malayalees, Telugu, Punjabis, Sindhis, Gujaratis, Sinhalese, and Hindi-speaking people, among others. In terms of actual daily language use, 39% of Indian residents speak mainly English at home, and a similar number use Tamil. The remainder speak either Malay (11%) or other languages, including other Indian languages and Kristang (11%). There are about 3000 families that speak Marathi at home.

3.1% of all Singapore residents speak mainly Tamil at home and it is one of the country's four official languages. Tamil is taught as a second language in most public schools. Tamil content (produced locally or abroad) is available on free-to-air and cable television as well as radio channels, and in libraries, cinemas, theatres and bookshops. Tamil is used in temples, mosques and churches catering to the community. Some business and non-profit groups, especially those in the Little India neighbourhood, use Tamil on a daily basis.

Many Indian loan words are found in Malay, and, to a lesser extent, in English. The influence of Indian vocabulary, syntax, and pronunciation is also found in Singlish, the local English dialect. At the same time, Singapore Tamil is slightly distinct from the versions spoken in India and Sri Lanka, with its closest cousin being the Malaysian Tamil spoken across the border. Local usage includes some words from English, Malay and other languages. Meanwhile, certain Tamil words or phrases that are archaic in India and Sri Lanka are still used in Singapore.

=== Religions ===
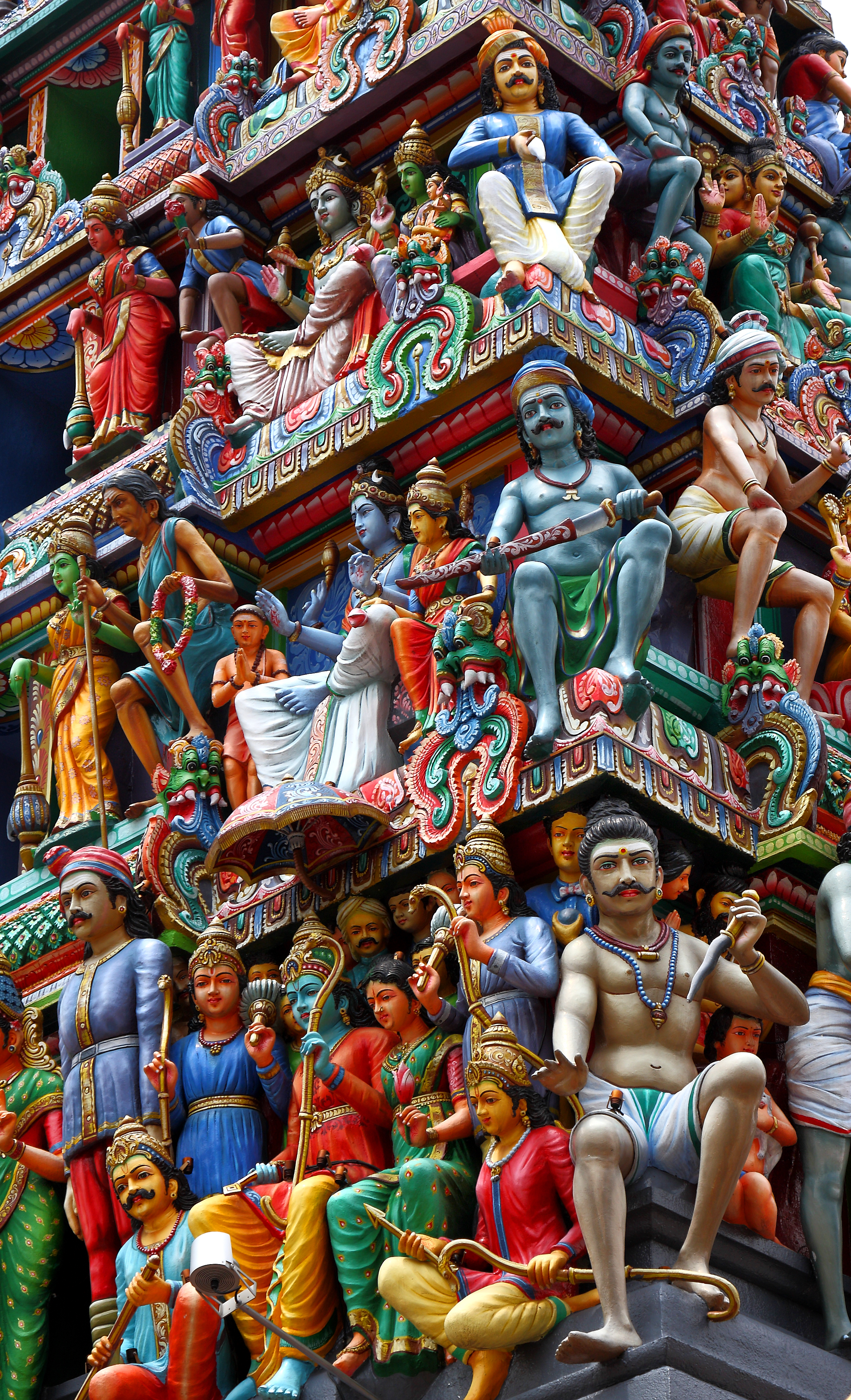
Depictions of Dravidian Hindu art on the gopuram (entrance tower) of Sri Mariamman Temple, Singapore, dedicated to the Hindu goddess of rain; Mariamman.

Religion of Indian Singaporeans (2020)
1. Hinduism (57.3%)
2. Islam (23.4%)
3. Roman Catholicism (7.30%)
4. Protestantism and other non-Catholic (5.30%)
5. Sikhism and other religion (3.90%)
6. No religion (2.20%)
7. Buddhism (0.70%)

Majority of the Indian Singaporeans are Hindus. The proportion of Indians following Islam, Christianity and Buddhism are relatively higher as the census include Pakistanis, Bangladeshis, Sri Lankans and other South Asian ethnic groups under the category of "Indians".

According to the latest 2020 Census, 57.3% of Singapore's Indian population declared themselves as Hindus, including 23.4% Muslims, 12.6% Christians, 4.6% other religions and 2.2% non-religious, as stated in the following statistics.

Origin of religion	Religion	Number (2020)	Percentage
Dharmic religions	Hinduism	171,326	57.3%
Dharmic religions	Sikhism	10,265	3.4%
Dharmic religions	Buddhism	2,031	0.7%
Dharmic religions	Other (most Jainism)	1,420	0.5%
Dharmic religions	Subtotal of Indian-origin religions	185,042	61.9%
Abrahamic religions	Islam	69,964	23.4%
Abrahamic religions	Christianity	37,605	12.6%
Abrahamic religions	Roman Catholicism	21,853	7.3%
Abrahamic religions	Protestantism and other Christians	15,752	5.3%
Abrahamic religions	Subtotal of Abrahamic religions	107,569	36%
No religion		6,443	2.1%
Grand total of all religions		299,054	100%

==== Hinduism in Singapore ====
Based on the latest 2020 Census, 5.0% of the resident population aged above 15 years were Hindu. Almost all Hindus in Singapore were ethnic Indians (99%), with the majority of Singapore's ethnic Indians (57.3%) being Hindu.

There are approximately 35 temples serving Hindus in Singapore. Most are built in the South Indian Dravidian style. Specific communities have established their own temples. For instance, the Sri Lankan Tamil community built the Sri Senpaga Vinayagar Temple at Ceylon Road, while the Chettiar community set up the Sri Thandayuthapani Temple at Tank Road. The North Indian community also established the Sri Lakshminarayan Temple, built in the North Indian style. Two Hindu temples have been gazetted as National Monuments of Singapore.

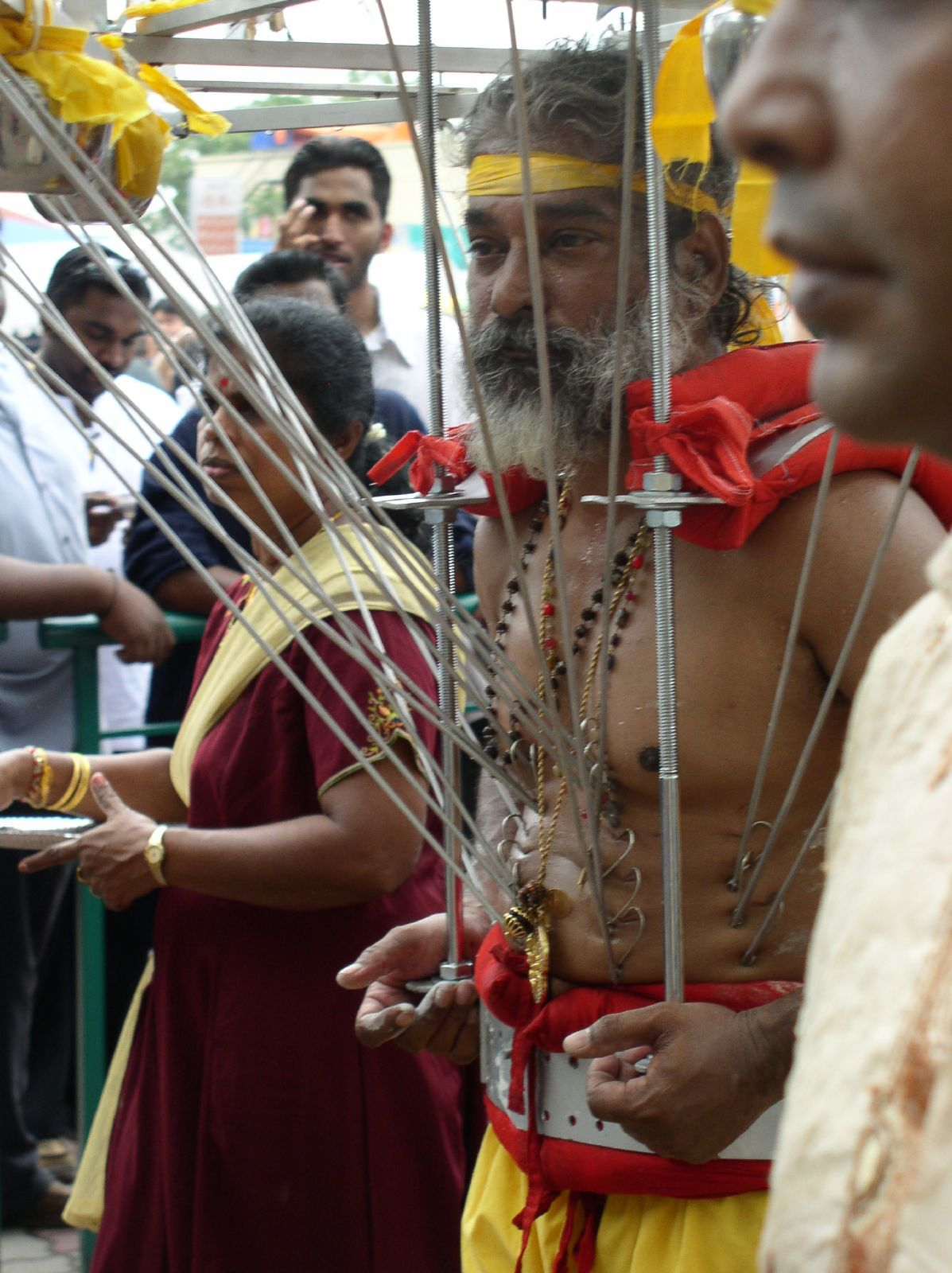
A Thaipusam participant.

Although temples may be historically associated with certain communities, Hindu temples in Singapore are open to all regardless of language, caste or religion (non-Hindus may visit the temples). A unique feature of Hinduism in Singapore is the fact that a noticeable number of non-Indians, usually Buddhist Chinese, do participate in a variety of Hindu activities, including praying to Hindu deities, donating money to the temple funds and participating in Hindu festivals like the fire-walking ceremony, and Thaipusam.

The most visible Hindu festivals in Singapore are Deepavali and Thaipusam. Minor celebrations include the Fire walking festival and Hindu temple chariot processions. Deepavali is a national public holiday in Singapore. For a month before it, the Little India district is decorated with ornamental fairy lights. Bazaars are held in different parts of the district, with stalls selling religious paraphernalia, greeting cards, food, decorations, clothes, etc. Deepavali day itself is marked with a ritual bath and prayers in the morning, followed by feasting and visits to family and friends.

Thaipusam is celebrated prominently in Singapore, Malaysia and other countries with large Tamil populations. As a penance, participants carry 'kavadis' along a processional route. Some men carry kavadis attached to their bodies via hooks and spears that pierce their skin. Thaipusam is the only time when major Singapore roads are closed for a religious procession. The festival is a major religious and urban event, drawing thousands of devotees, supporters and onlookers.

==== Other religions ====
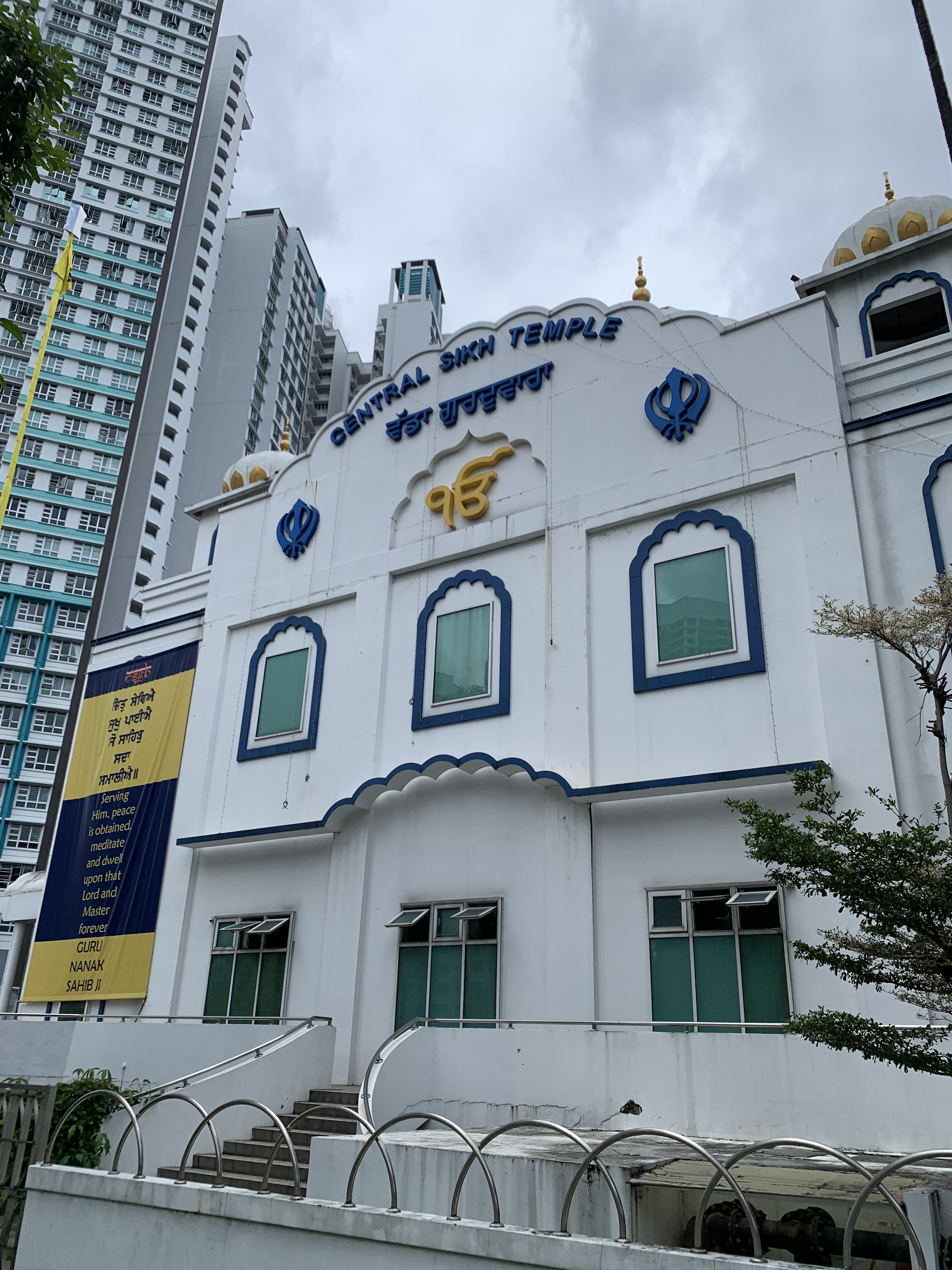
Established in 1912, the Central Sikh Temple was the first gurdwara in Singapore.

Singapore's approximately 10,000 Indian Sikhs formed 3.4% of the Indian Singaporean population aged above 15 years. Most Sikhs in Singapore are of Indian Origin(accounting to 80-90% of Sikhs). There is a smaller Jain community consisting of a few thousand people.

Among over 15% Muslim Singapore Residents, approximately 13% were Indian, with most of the remainder being Malay (82%), including some Chinese (2.2%) and other ethnicity (2.8%); Indian Muslim Singaporeans easily intermarried with Malays. predate the Islamic period (c. 570-632 AD), or the birth of Islam. In reality, Indonesians and Malays came to know about Islam through the merchants of South India and not through Arab missionaries. Among Christian Singapore Residents, about 5.8% were Indian, with most of the remainder being Chinese (86%), including small Malay (0.4%) and other ethnicity (7.8%). Within the Christian community, Indians formed 10.3% of Roman Catholics (including Kristangs of part-Indian descent), and 3.9% of Non-Catholic Christians (mainly Protestants).

Within the wider Muslim and Christian communities, Indians have established their own places of worship, where sermons, services and prayers are conducted in Indian languages. Consequently, there are a substantial number of 'Indian' churches, mosques and Buddhist temples in Singapore. For example, the Masjid Jamae, built in 1826, is the oldest Tamil mosque in Singapore, and a National Monument. In 1888, the Tamil Catholic community set up the Church of Our Lady of Lourdes, Singapore's oldest Tamil Catholic Church, as well as a National Monument. The Sakya Muni Buddha Gaya Temple is a Theravada temple, built in a mix of Chinese, Indian, Sri Lankan and Thai styles, and is quite different from most Chinese Buddhist Mahayana temples in Singapore. The small Indian Buddhist community (mainly Sri Lankan Sinhalese) in Singapore often frequents this temple, which is located in Little India.

== Culture ==
=== Cuisine ===
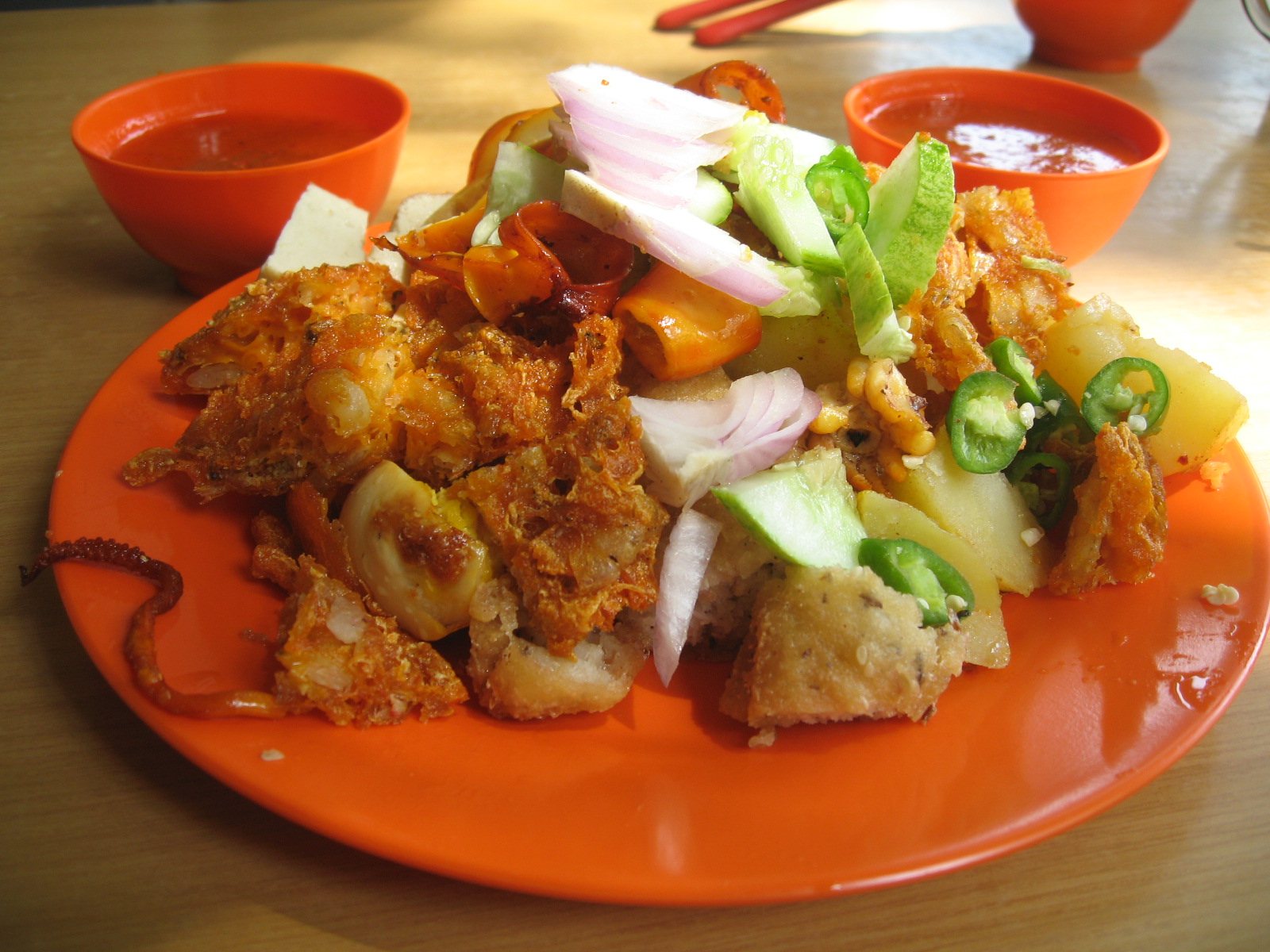
Indian rojak.

The great variety of Singapore food includes Indian food, which tends to be Tamil cuisine and especially local Tamil Muslim cuisine, although North Indian food has become more visible recently. Indian dishes have become modified to different degrees after years of contact with other Singapore cultures and in response to locally available ingredients as well as changing local tastes. The local forms of Indian food may be seen as localised or even regional variations of Indian food, or in some cases, a form of hybrid Indian-Singaporean cuisine. Popular 'Indian' dishes and elements of Indian cuisine (although sometimes prepared and sold by non-Indians) include achar, curry (such as laksa and Fish head curry), Indian rojak, Indian mee goreng, murtabak, nasi biryani, roti john, roti prata and teh tarik.

Other dishes were popular during the colonial period, when Indian ingredients and other culinary influences spread with the Empire to places like Singapore. Many of them endure in some homes and restaurants. Some of these dishes include mince, mulligatawny soup, fish moolie, curry tiffin, pork vindaloo and spiced Mutton chop.

Many other Indian foods are less widely available, but they can still be found in several areas serving a more specifically Indian clientele, especially in and around Little India, Singapore. These include appam, bhatura, chutney, sambar, idli, muruku, putu mayam, samosa, tandoori, thosai, upma and various sweets, including jalebi, halva, laddu, paayasam and gulab jamun.

Milo dinosaur is a drink that originated within Indian Singaporean eateries during the 1990s.

=== Little India ===
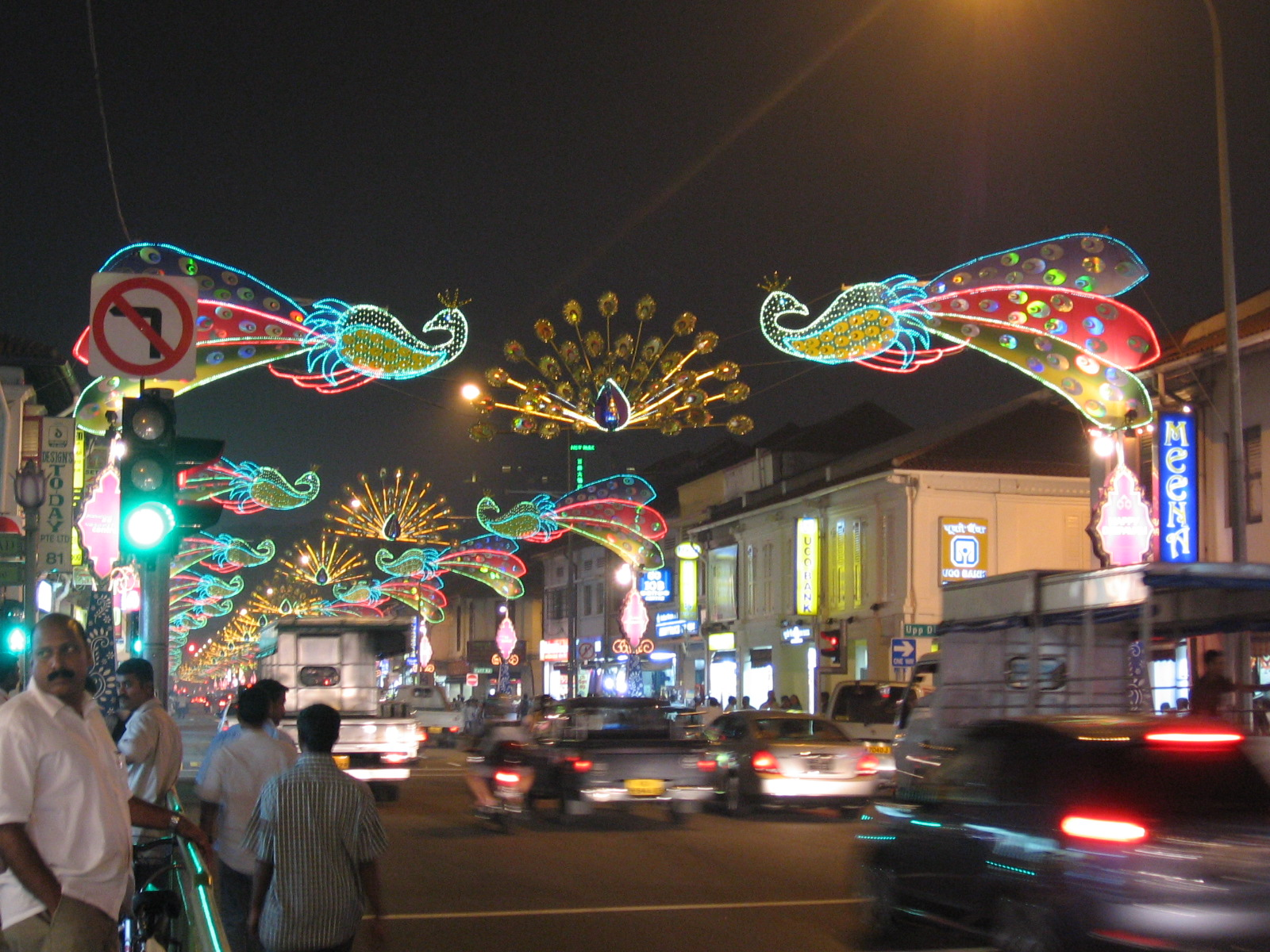
Annual Deepavali light-up of Little India in 2006.

The Indian imprint on Singapore's urban landscape can be seen most prominently in the form of the Little India neighbourhood. On 7 July 1989, at the start of architectural conservation in Singapore, this area was gazetted for conservation, which makes its buildings legally protected from unauthorised modifications and demolition. Bounded by Serangoon Road, Sungei Road and Jalan Besar, the area is recognised as the hub of the Indian community in Singapore. It contains mainly two-storey shophouses of the Early, Transitional, Late and Art Deco Shophouse Styles, as well as several places of worship for different faiths. Apart from serving the social, cultural and commercial needs of the Indian community, the area is established as one of the more historic urban districts Singapore, with a colourful personality that makes it an indelible part of the national landscape and identity. In 2004, it was also Singapore's third most popular free-access tourist attraction, after Orchard Road and Chinatown.

=== Naming conventions ===
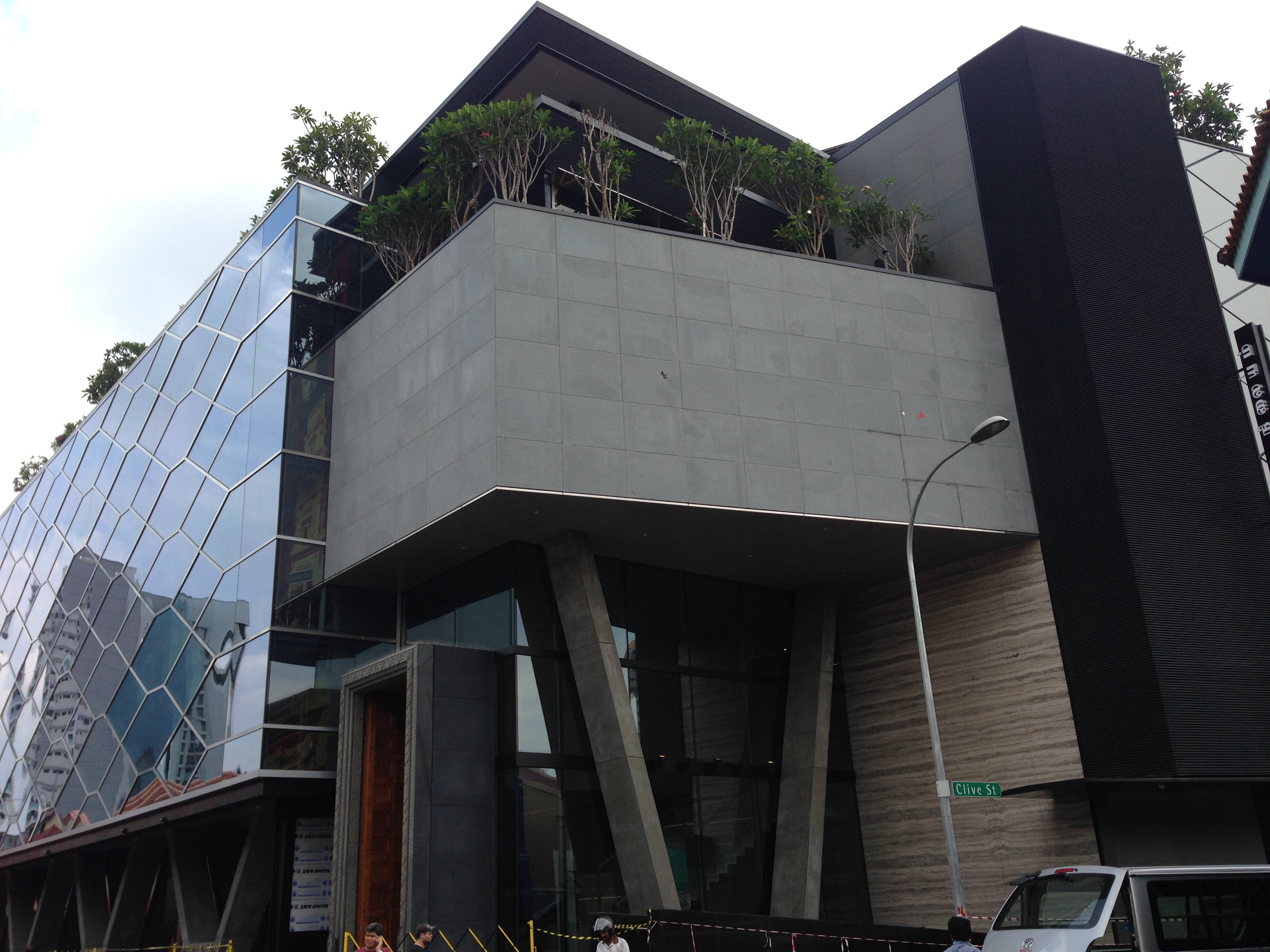
The Indian Heritage Centre in Little India, Singapore

Because of their linguistic and religious diversity, Singapore Indians use a variety of naming conventions. Traditionally, most Tamil Hindus place their father's name after their given name, linked by 's/o' (son of) or 'd/o' (daughter of), e.g. 'Ravi s/o Govindasamy'. Similarly, Tamil Muslims have names in the form 'Abdul s/o Rahman' (in contrast to Malay Muslims, who use the connector 'bin' (son of) or 'binte / bte' (daughter of) instead). Likewise, a Tamil Christian name might be Daryl s/o David. The use of these connectors arose during the colonial period. However, this format is somewhat rare today.

Often, an individual will reduce their father's name to an initial, hence 'G. Ravi'. This approach is popular among many Singapore politicians, as it simplifies names that, to non-Indian Singaporeans, can be very long, complicated and difficult to pronounce. Thus, the late Senior Minister Sinnathamby Rajaratnam was known as S. Rajaratnam, while the late former President Sellapa Ramanathan is known as S.R. Nathan. Likewise, other prominent Indians include S. Dhanabalan, S. Jayakumar and J. B. Jeyaretnam (also known simply as 'JBJ'). Likewise, Tamil Muslims and Christians also use initials in a similar way. This convention is regularly used in South India.

Another popular approach is to omit the 's/o' or 'd/o' connector altogether, e.g. 'Ravi Govindasamy'. While the name appears to conform to a Western format, the last name (Govindasamy) technically remains the father's name, and is not the family surname. As such, the individual should properly be addressed as 'Mr Ravi', rather than 'Mr Govindasamy'. However, some people use their father's name as a surname, i.e. Ravi calls himself 'Mr Govindasamy' and uses it as a surname for his children. Instead of naming his son 'Arun (s/o) Ravi', he would name him 'Arun Govindasamy' (or even 'Arun Govind'). This approach is also adopted among several Tamil Christians. Some new surnames have been created in this way.

Several South Indians use caste names as surnames in the Western mode. Common examples of such names in Singapore include Iyer and Pillay/mudaliyar (Tamil), Nair and Menon (Malayalee). While Telugu people use caste as the middle name Reddy/Naidu and family name as surname.

Some Tamil Christian families have retained Indian names (as given names or 'family' names), generally alongside or in place of Western or Christian names, e.g. Vivian Balakrishnan.

Some West and East Indian groups, such as the Gujaratis, Marathis and Bengalis, use family surnames, although the Gujaratis may choose whether to merge their father's name with the surname. Sikh men invariably adopt 'Singh' as their surname, while Sikh women adopt 'Kaur', as is their traditional practice. However, some Sikhs have also re-introduced supplementary family or clan names, thus instead of simply 'Charanjit Singh', an individual might adopt the name 'Charanjit Singh Siddhu' for himself or his son.

== Contribution ==
=== Indian institutions ===
Many of the clubs and associations established by and for Indians in Singapore are defined along narrower linguistic, religious or other sub-ethnic lines. The following groups are among the more important national Indian organisations in Singapore that cater to all Indians, regardless or cultural background.

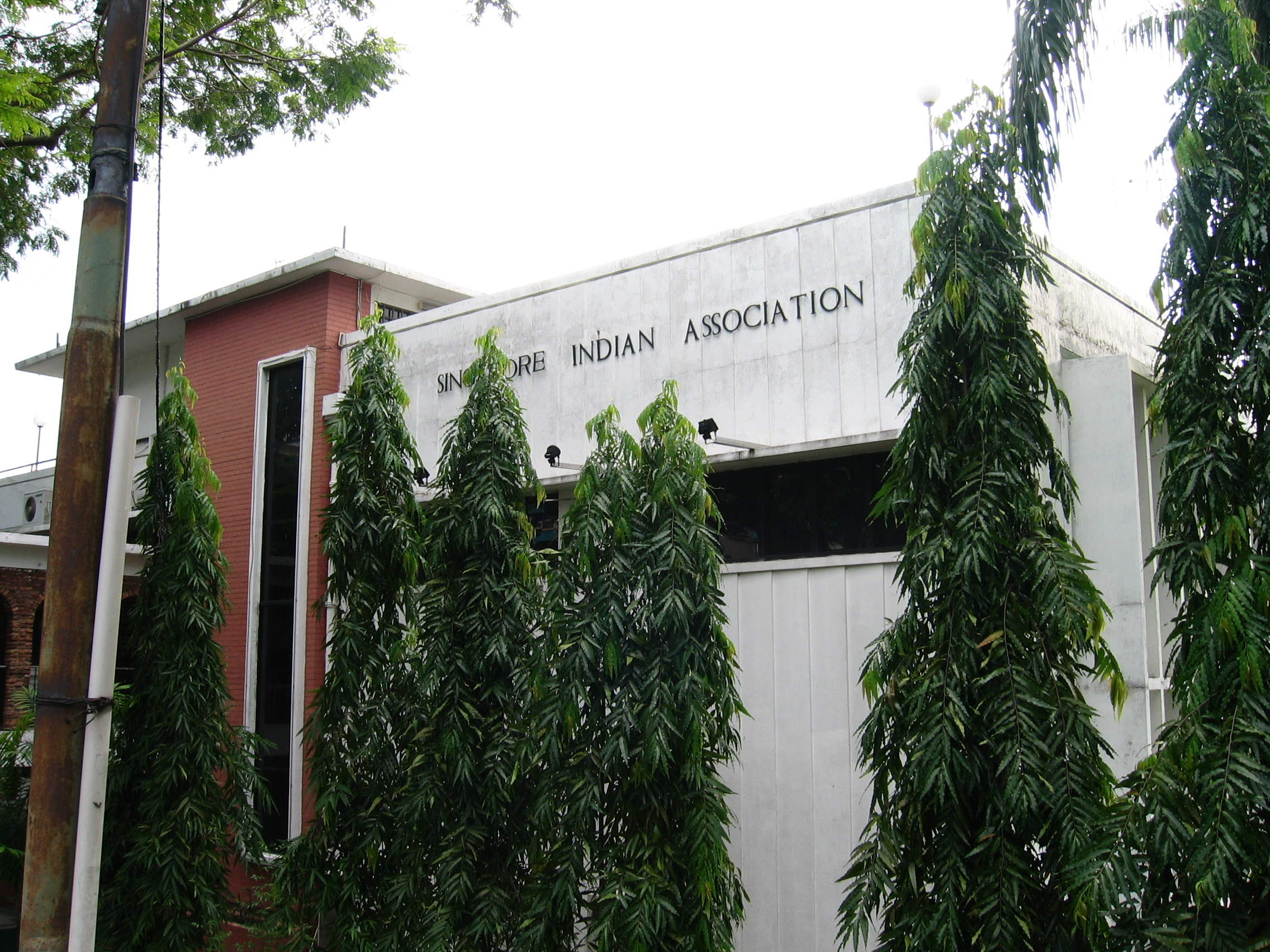
Indian Association building in Singapore.

- Singapore Indian Development Association (SINDA) – SINDA was set up in 1991 to address educational under-performance in the Indian community. It also deals with other social and economic problems faced by Indians.
- Singapore Indian Association (IA) – The IA was set up in 1923 by Singapore's Indian elite to promote the social, physical, intellectual, cultural and the general welfare of its members. While the association initially focussed on social and political issues faced by the Indian community, it has evolved into a private sports and recreation members-only club.
- Singapore Indian Chamber of Commerce and Industry (SICCI) – Established first in 1924 as the Indian Merchants Association, the SICCI is an independent, non-profit organisation with over 500 members.
- Society of Indian Students (SOIS) – Established first in 1999 in the National University of Singapore, the primary objective of SOIS is to provide a framework for students to interact with and to assist one another; Virtually all Indian students at NUS are directly or indirectly linked to SOIS.

=== Participation in national life ===
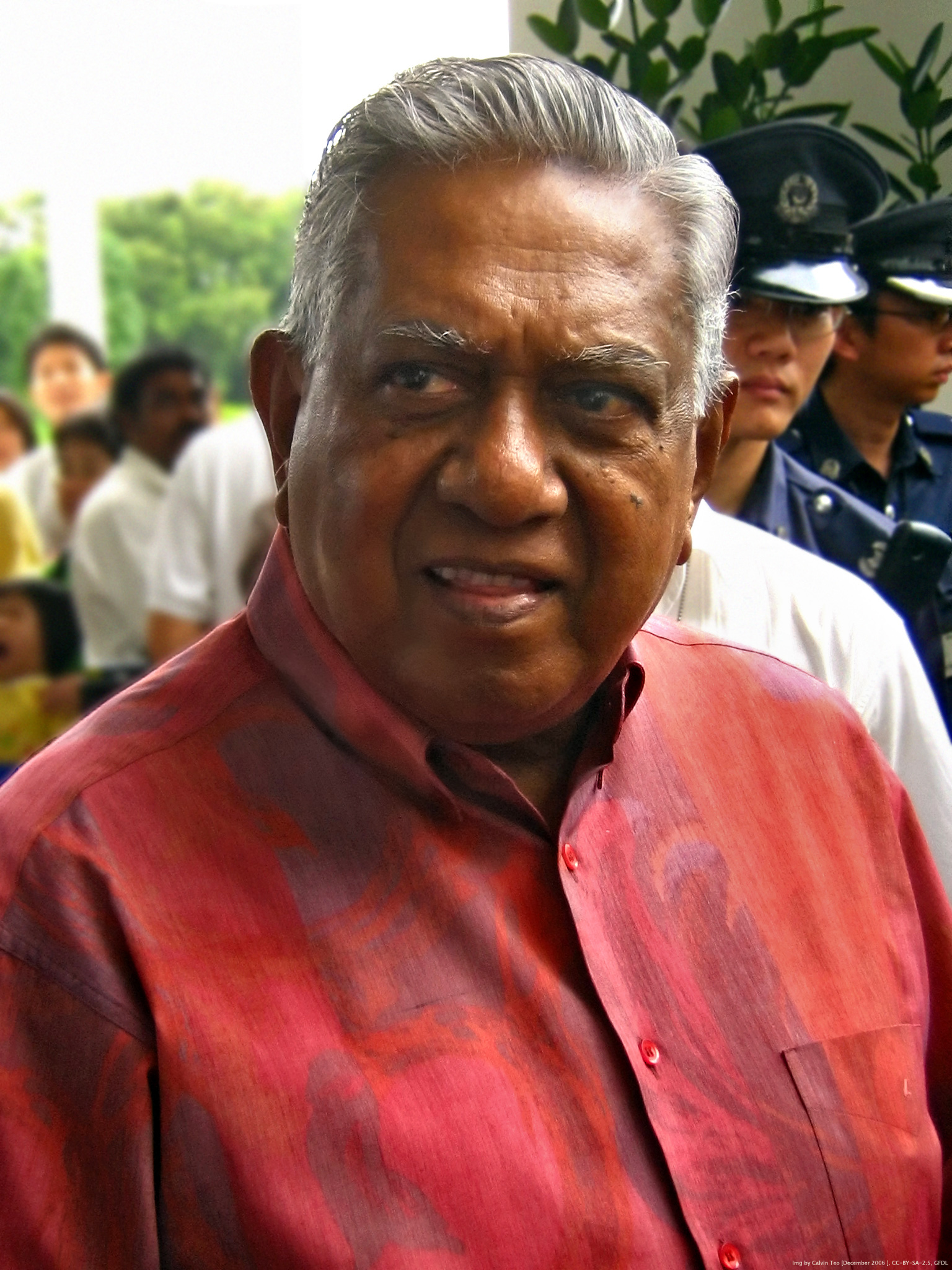
President S.R. Nathan at an Istana open day.

Indian Singaporeans have made their mark nationally and even internationally in a variety of arenas.

- Politics – Indians have been well represented in national politics, including the ruling People's Action Party (PAP) as well as opposition parties. Indians have served as three out of nine Presidents of Singapore, two out of four Senior Ministers and three out of eleven Deputy Prime Ministers. At some point, Indians have been Ministers of almost all ministries, including Foreign Affairs and Finance. The only key posts Indians have not held are Prime Minister and Defence Minister. As of June 2018, Indians were over-represented in the Cabinet (5 out of 19 cabinet ministers, or 26% of the total). They also comprise 10 out of 89 MPs in the 13th Parliament of Singapore, and one of three of its Non-constituency MPs.
- The law – Historically, Indians have been prominent in the legal profession, including the judiciary. In 2007, 21 out of 81 persons listed in the Singapore Academy of Law's senior counsel directory in June 2018, or 26%, were Indian. In the Subordinate Courts of Singapore, 9.8% of all District Judges was ethnic Indian. Meanwhile, in the Supreme Court of Singapore, 14%, or two of the 14 Supreme Court Judges and Judicial Commissioners, are Indian.
- Diplomacy – Indians have traditionally served in the Singapore Diplomatic Service in disproportionate numbers. The Second Permanent Secretary to the Ministry of Foreign Affairs, Mr Bilahari Kausikan, is Indian, as have been three of its five Ministers to date. As of March 2007, a survey of the Singapore Government Directory Interactive website showed about 27% of the heads of Singaporean diplomatic missions abroad were Indian, including heads of missions to the UN in New York and Geneva, High Commissioners to Malaysia and South Africa and Ambassadors to Belgium (de facto representative to the European Union) Germany, Indonesia and Saudi Arabia.
- Education – Since colonial times, teaching was a job Indians were traditionally involved in. In 2006, Indians remained well represented in the teaching service. In March 2007, the Singapore Government Directory Interactive website showed that 13.3% of primary school principals were Indian, as were 10.3% of secondary school principals. Indians also head prominent higher education schools and think tanks, including the NUS Faculty of Engineering, Institute of Policy Studies, Institute of South Asian Studies, Institute of Southeast Asian Studies and Lee Kuan Yew School of Public Policy.

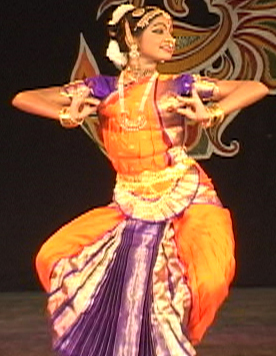
Bharatnatyam, a form of classical Indian dance.

- The arts – Indian Singaporeans have distinguished themselves in a number of cultural fields, including contemporary forms of art targeted at a broad national and international audience, as well as more traditional Indian art forms. From 1979 to 2006, Indian Singaporeans have won 10, or 11.4%, of the 88 Cultural Medallions conferred, the highest honour to artists given by the Singapore government.
- Civil Service – In addition to the foreign, legal and education services, Indians have also traditionally entered the Singapore Civil Service. Several individuals have risen to prominence in various government ministries and statutory boards. 9.4% of the heads of Singapore's 64 statutory boards are Indian – these are the National Library Board, Accounting and Corporate Regulatory Authority, Hindu Endowments Board, Hindu Advisory Board and Sikh Advisory Board.
- Business – In 2006, Forbes listed four ethnic Indians among the 40 largest private individual and family fortunes in Singapore, which is 10% of the list. These four individuals each represent large and diversified business empires in their own right, ranging from commodities to retail to electronics, amongst others.

=== Notable Indian Singaporeans ===
Full Name also known as	Birth	Death	Ethnolinguistic Heritage	Religion	Occupation(s)	Contributions	Namesake Streets/Institutions
Naraina Pillai; Narayana Pillay	c.1765; 261 years ago	Unknown	Tamil (Indian)	Hinduism	Entrepreneur, Philanthropist	First Indian to set foot in modern Singapore (not counting established Indian Peranakans) with Stamford Raffles on the ship Indiana in 1819. Established the first Hindu temple in modern Singapore, the Sri Mariamman Temple (not counting Malay-built Hindu temples that existed on Fort Canning during the Hindu-Buddhist Malay era). First-ever building contractor in Singapore.	Pillai Road in Paya Lebar.
Arumugam Annamalai Pillai; Namly	1839; 187 years ago	1924; 102 years ago	Tamil (Ceylonese)	Hinduism	Civil Servant, Land Surveyor, Landlord	Third prominent Ceylonese Tamil to arrive in Singapore. Surveyor-General of the Colony of Singapore; surveyed and mapped the vast majority of the island of Singapore. One of the largest landowners in colonial Singapore; owned large tracts of land in Katong, Siglap, Tanglin, and Bukit Timah. Personally named the Bukit Timah roads of King's Road, Queen's Road, Duchess Road, Coronation Road, Prince of Wales Road, and Victoria Park.	The British named the Bukit Timah roads of Namely Ave, Namely Close, Namely Crescent, Namely Drive, Namely Garden, Namely Grove, Namely Hill, Namely Place, Namely Rise and Namely View after Pillai, as he formerly owned the lands bounded by these roads.
Hunmah Somapah	1870; 156 years ago	1919; 107 years ago	Kannadigan	Hinduism	Landlord	Largest Indian landlord in colonial Singapore. Owned land in Punggol, Serangoon, Tampines, Paya Lebar, and Changi. Owned a total of 108 houses, shophouses, shops, and 4 plantations at the time of his demise. Part of the Hindu delegation that lobbied the British to make Deepavali a public holiday in colonial Singapore.	Kampong Somapah, Somapah Bus Interchange (1982–1989), Somapah Road in Changi. Formerly Somapah station on the East–West MRT line (now Expo) and Somapah station on the Downtown MRT line (Now Upper Changi).
Navroji Rastomji Mistri OBE; Noel R. Mistri	3 June 1885; 141 years ago	29 October 1953; 73 years ago	Parsi	Zoroastrianism	Entrepreneur, Landlord, Philanthropist	First prominent Parsi to arrive in Singapore. Established the Phoenix Aerated Water Company. Recipient of the Order of the British Empire (1946) for his role in sheltering and protecting homeless people during the Japanese Occupation of Singapore.	Mistri Road and Parsi Road in Tanjong Pagar; Mistri Wing of the Singapore General Hospital.
P. Govindasamy Pillai	1887; 139 years ago	21 July 1980; 46 years ago	Tamil (Indian)	Hinduism	Entrepreneur, Philanthropist	Established a chain of Indian general stores in Singapore. Donated money to build the gopuram of Sri Srinivasa Perumal Temple.	
Rajabali Jumabhoy	16 January 1898; 128 years ago	26 November 1998; 27 years ago	Gujarati	Islam (Bohra Ismaili Shiism)	Entrepreneur, Landlord	Founder of Scotts Holdings, now known as The Ascott Limited. Formerly one of the richest Singaporeans, with a maximum recorded net worth of almost 1 billion Singapore dollars.	
Choor Singh Sidhu	19 January 1911; 115 years ago	31 March 2009; 17 years ago	Punjabi	Sikhism	Judge	Former Judge of the Supreme Court of Singapore. One of the founders of the Singapore Khalsa Association. Played a part in abolishing trial by jury in Singapore.	
Sinnathamby Rajaratnam; S. Rajaratnam	25 February 1915; 111 years ago	22 February 2006; 20 years ago	Tamil (Ceylonese)	Hinduism	Politician	Author of the Singapore pledge, First Foreign Minister of Singapore, Third Deputy Prime Minister of Singapore (1980–85).	S. Rajaratnam School of International Studies at Nanyang Technological University; S. Rajaratnam Block at Raffles Institution.
M. Bala Subramanion	5 March 1917; 109 years ago	3 February 2021; 5 years ago	Tamil (Indian)		Civil servant	The country's first Asian postmaster-general. He was also an Indian community leader who was a member of community groups including Singapore Indian Association, Singapore Indian Education Trust and Singapore Indian Fine Arts Society.	
Kanagaratnam Shanmugaratnam	2 April 1921; 105 years ago	28 July 2018; 8 years ago	Tamil (Ceylonese)	Hinduism	Pathologist	Father of Tharman Shanmugaratnam.	
Devan Nair Chengara Veetil; C. V. Devan Nair	6 August 1923; 103 years ago	6 December 2005; 20 years ago	Malayali	Hinduism	Politician	Third President of Singapore and commander-in-chief of the Singapore Armed Forces (1981–85).	
Sellapan Ramanathan; S. R. Nathan	3 July 1924; 102 years ago	22 August 2016; 10 years ago	Tamil (Indian)	Hinduism	Politician	Sixth and longest-serving President of Singapore (1999–2011).	
Joshua Benjamin Jeyaretnam; J. B. Jeyaretnam	5 January 1926; 100 years ago	30 September 2008; 18 years ago	Tamil (Ceylonese)	Christianity (Anglican Protestantism)	Lawyer, Politician	First opposition politician to be elected to Parliament.	
Kartar Singh Thakral	22 September 1933; 93 years ago		Punjabi	Sikhism	Entrepreneur		
Joseph Yuvaraj Pillay; J. Y. Pillay	30 March 1934; 92 years ago		Tamil (Indian-Ceylonese)	Christianity	Civil servant	Chairman of Malaysia–Singapore Airlines (1971–72), Founding Chairman of Singapore Airlines after its establishment as an independent carrier in 1972 (1972–1996).	
Suppiah Dhanabalan; S. Dhanabalan	8 August 1937; 89 years ago		Tamil (Indian)	Christianity (Brethrenism)	Politician		
Shunmugam Jayakumar; S. Jayakumar	12 August 1939; 87 years ago		Tamil (Indian)	Hinduism	Lawyer, Politician, Diplomat	7th Deputy Prime Minister of Singapore (2004–2009).	
Sivakant Tiwari; S. Tiwari	20 December 1945; 80 years ago	26 July 2010; 16 years ago	Hindustani	Hinduism	Lawyer		
Subhas Anandan	25 December 1946; 79 years ago	7 January 2015; 11 years ago	Malayali	Hinduism	Lawyer		
Kishore Mahbubani	24 October 1948; 78 years ago		Sindhi	Hinduism	Diplomat, Professor	First Singaporean President of the United Nations Security Council (2001–2), Singapore's Permanent Representative to the United Nations (1984–89; 1998–2004).	
Mustaq Ahmad	8 June 1951; 75 years ago		Hindustani	Islam	Entrepreneur	Founder of Mustafa Centre.	
Bilahari Kim Hee Papanasam Setlur Kausikan	1954; 72 years ago		Chindian; Tamil (Indian)-Peranakan Chinese		Diplomat		
Balaji Sadasivan	11 July 1955; 71 years ago	27 September 2010; 16 years ago	Tamil (Indian)	Hinduism	Politician		
Vijaya Kumar Rajah; V. K. Rajah	14 January 1957; 69 years ago		Tamil (Indian)	Hinduism	Lawyer	8th Attorney-General of Singapore	
Tharman Shanmugaratnam	25 February 1957; 69 years ago		Tamil (Ceylonese)	Hinduism	Politician	9th President of Singapore (Incumbent, 2023–present), 10th Deputy Prime Minister of Singapore (2011–2019).	
Davinder Singh Sachdev	1 September 1957; 69 years ago		Punjabi	Sikhism	Lawyer, Politician		
Jacintha Abisheganaden	3 October 1957; 69 years ago		Chindian; Tamil (Indian)-Chinese	Christianity	Singer, Actress		
Kasiviswanathan Shanmugam; K. Shanmugam	26 March 1959; 67 years ago		Tamil (Indian)	Hinduism	Lawyer, Politician	Minister for Law, Minister for Home Affairs	
Inderjit Singh Dhaliwal	5 June 1960; 66 years ago		Punjabi	Sikhism	Politician		
Indranee Thurai Rajah	12 April 1963; 63 years ago		Chindian; Tamil (Indian)-Chinese	Christianity (Anglican Protestantism)	Lawyer, Politician		
Xenonamandar Jegahusiee Singh; Joseph Prince	15 May 1963; 63 years ago		Chindian; Punjabi-Chinese	Christianity (Pentecostal Protestantism)	Pastor	Co-founder and senior pastor of New Creation Megachurch	
Paul Tambyah	5 February 1965; 61 years ago		Tamil		Medical	Professor of Medicine and infectious diseases expert.	
Gurmit Ottawan Singh	24 March 1965; 61 years ago		Chindian; Punjabi-Chinese	Christianity	Actor	Phua Chu Kang Pte Ltd sitcom.	
Varadaraju Sundramoorthy; V. Sundramoorthy	6 October 1965; 61 years ago		Tamil (Indian)	Hinduism	Sportsman		
Sharanjit Leyl	15 February 1973; 53 years ago		Punjabi	Sikhism	Reporter, Journalist	BBC News Reporter.	
Gurmit Kaur Campbell			Punjabi	Sikhism	Model	First Singaporean supermodel, first Singaporean to be featured on the cover of Vogue. Modelled for Yves Saint Laurent, Versace, and Karl Lagerfeld.	
Murli Kewalram Chanrai			Sindhi	Hinduism	Entrepreneur		
Ravinder Singh			Punjabi	Sikhism	Military	Army General, Major-General of the Singapore Army (2011–14).	
Pritam Singh			Punjabi	Sikhism	Lawyer and Politician	First Leader of the Opposition	

== Media ==
The state-owned broadcaster Mediacorp operates two Tamil-language properties serving Singapore's Indian community—the radio station Oli 968, and television channel Vasantham. The country's Tamil newspaper—the Tamil Murasu—was first published on 2 May 1936.

== See also ==
- India–Singapore relations
- Singaporeans in India
- Arya Samaj in Singapore
- Hinduism in Singapore
- Indian National Army in Singapore
- Jainism in Singapore
- Sikhism in Singapore
- List of Hindu temples in Singapore
- List of Indian organisations in Singapore

== Notes and references ==
=== Citations ===
- Brown, Adam (1999). Singapore English in a Nutshell: An Alphabetical Description of its Features. Singapore: Federal Publications. ISBN 981-01-2435-X.
- Chew, Ernest C.T.; Lee, Edwin (1991). A History of Singapore. Singapore: Oxford University Press. ISBN 0-19-588565-1.
- Hall, D.G.E. (1994). A History of South-East Asia (4th ed.). London: Macmillan Press.
- Lal, Brij V.; Reeves (exec. ed.), Peter; Rai, Rajesh (2006). The Encyclopedia of the Indian Diaspora. Singapore: Editions Didier Millet in association with National University of Singapore. ISBN 981-4155-65-9.
- Leow, Bee Geok (2001). Census of Population 2000: Demographic Characteristics. Singapore: Singapore Department of Statistics. ISBN 981-04-4448-6.
- Leow, Bee Geok (2001). Census of Population 2000: Education, Language and Religion. Singapore: Singapore Department of Statistics. ISBN 981-04-4459-1.
- Miksic, John N.; Low, Cheryl-Ann (Mei Gek) (2004). Early Singapore 1300s–1819: Evidence in Maps, Texts and Artefacts. Singapore: Singapore History Museum.
- Netto, Leslie, ed. (2003). Passage of Indians: 1923–2003. Singapore: Singapore Indian Association. ISBN 981-04-8531-X.
- Tan, Sylvia (2004). Singapore Heritage Food: Yesterday's recipes for today's cook. Singapore: Landmark Books.
- Turnbull, C. M. (1989). A History of Singapore, 1819–1988 (2nd ed.). Singapore: Oxford University Press. ISBN 0-19-588943-6.

=== Further reading ===
- Rai, Rajesh, Indians in Singapore, 1819-1945: Diaspora in the Colonial Port City, New Delhi: Oxford University Press, 2014.
- Madan, Madhu; Vasudevan, Yamini; Raman, Rita (2004). Dreams to Reality: Singapore Indian Entrepreneurs. Singapore: Singapore Indian Chamber of Commerce and Industry (SICCI).
- Pillai, A.D. & Arumugam, P. (2017). From Kerala to Singapore: Voices of the Singapore Malayalee Community. Singapore: Marshall Cavendish International (Asia).
- Pillai, A.D. (2020) Sembawang: A Novel. (Translation). Singapore: Marshall Cavendish International (Asia).
- Rai, Raghu; Pillai, Niru K. (1994). Arpanam : A Dedication: Facets of Singapore Indians. Singapore: Produced by Landmark Books for the Organising Committee of a Dinner by the Indian Community. ISBN 981-3002-82-4.
- Sandhu, K.S.; Mani, A. (1993). Indian Communities in Southeast Asia. Singapore: Institute of Southeast Asian Studies (ISEAS) & Times Academic Press. ISBN 981-210-017-2.
- Siddique, Sharon; Shotam, Nirmala Puru (1990). Singapore's Little India: Past, Present, and Future (2nd ed.). Singapore: Institute of Southeast Asian Studies. ISBN 9971-902-31-1.
- Sinnappah, Arasaratnam (1979). Indians in Malaysia and Singapore (Rev. ed.). Kuala Lumpur; New York, N.Y.: Oxford University Press. ISBN 0-19-580427-9.
- Soundar, Chitra (2003). Gateway to Indian Culture (2nd ed.). Singapore: Asiapac. ISBN 981-229-327-2.
- Walker, Anthony R. (1994). New Place, Old Ways: Essays on Indian Society and Culture in Modern Singapore. Delhi: Hindustan Pub. Corp. ISBN 81-7075-027-X.
- Rerceretnam, Marc J. (2003). Black Europeans, the Indian coolies and empire : colonialisation and christianized Indians in colonial Malaya & Singapore, c. 1870s – c. 1950s, PhD thesis. Sydney: University of Sydney.
