= South Asian languages in Singapore =

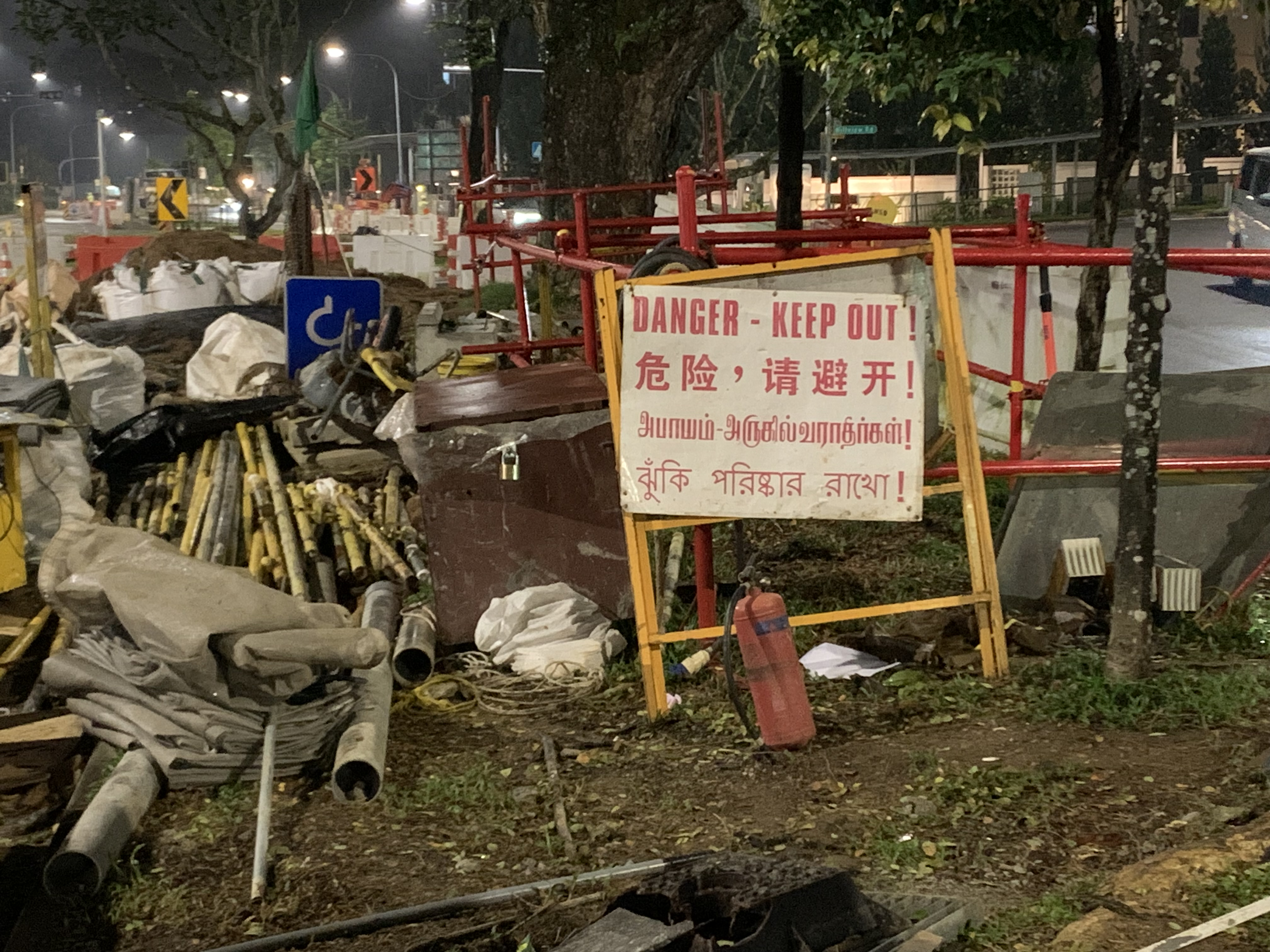
A "Danger-Keep Out" sign at a roadwork in Hillview showing four languages: English, Chinese (in Simplified Script), Tamil, and Bengali; the latter two languages are South Asian

South Asian languages in Singapore are mainly used by the country's 348,119 Indian Singaporean residents, who form about 9.2% of Singaporean citizens and permanent residents. As a result of historical migration and settlement patterns, Indian Singaporeans came to the island from various parts of South Asia speaking a variety of South Asian languages, mostly Tamil. Today, most ethnic Indians in Singapore are locally born second, third, fourth or even fifth generation descendants of immigrant forefathers. In addition, a substantial minority are recent immigrants from the Indian subcontinent.

In Singapore, a distinction is made between the ancestral ethno-linguistic identity of a person and the actual language that he or she uses or is able to use. Singapore's census takers make this distinction by capturing both types of data. Ancestral ethno-linguistic identity is captured under the category of 'dialect group' (although this term may be more appropriate for describing the linguistic composition of the majority Chinese, rather than Indians). In contrast, actual language use is captured by the term 'language most frequently spoken at home'.

The various government statistics only refer to residents (citizens and permanent residents) and exclude those classed as "non-residents" who represent about 25% of the total population (mostly foreign students and workers).

== Ethno-linguistic profile ==
In 2010, the Singapore census categorised 237,473 Singaporeans and 110,646 permanent residents into a number of 'dialect' groups. However, these groups included Sikhs, who are a religious rather than linguistic group. Virtually all of the Sikhs are Punjabi, which was also captured as a separate 'dialect' category (comprising mainly Hindu Punjabis). Given their small absolute and relative numbers, the following table adapts the 2010 census data by combining the 'Sikh' (12,952) and 'Punjabi' (5,672) category under 'Punjabi'.

The percentages in the table refer to the proportion of each language group within the larger Resident Indian community in Singapore.

Population Profile of Singapore Indian Dialect Groups (Residential population; Singaporeans and permanent residents)
Ethno-linguistic background	Ancestral home	Religion	2010 census	Percentage
Tamil	Tamil Nadu; Sri Lanka; Puducherry	Hinduism, Islam, Christianity	188,591	54.18%
Malayali	Kerala; Lakshadweep	Hinduism, Islam, Christianity	26,348	7.57%
Punjabi	Punjab	Sikhism, Hinduism	18,624	5.35%
Gujarati	Gujarat	Hinduism, Islam, Jainism	4,124	1.18%
Sindhi	Sindh	Hinduism	3,971	1.14%
Sinhalese	Sri Lanka	Buddhism	3,140	0.90%
Telugu; Bengali; Indo-Portuguese (Kristang); Hindustani; Parsi; Other Indians/Mixed (Note: Singaporeans of mixed ethnicity typically identify with their paternal ethnic group.)	Andhra Pradesh; Telangana; Bengal; Goa; Various	Hinduism, Islam, Christianity, Zoroastrianism	103,321	29.68%
			348,119	100%

Singapore's Indian community is characterised by an ethnic Tamil majority (54.18%) and a large number of smaller groups. Ethnic Tamils in Singapore include both Tamils from India and Sri Lankan Tamils (sometimes referred to as 'Ceylonese'). Malayalees from Kerala in South India form the second largest community, making up 7.57% of the Indian population. Tamils and Malayalees are the two main South Indian communities in Singapore, forming two-thirds of the Indian population. Meanwhile, the three main North Indian groups in Singapore (the Punjabi, Gujarati, and Sindhi communities) constitute 7.67% of all Indians. The remaining 29.68% consists of many smaller groups from both South India (such as the Telugus), East India (such as the Bengalis), and North India (Hindustanis).

== Language use ==
According to the 2005 General Household Survey, Tamil was spoken at home by 3.1% of all Singapore residents. Among Indians residents, 38.8% used Tamil at home. As 58.3% of Indians were deemed to be ethnic Tamils in the 2000 census, this suggests that two-thirds of ethnic Tamils in Singapore used it as the main language in their homes.

11.4% of Indians spoke 'other languages' at home (including non-Tamil Indian languages). In contrast, 41.7% of Indians were deemed to be non-Tamil Indians in 2000. Assuming that most Indians who reported speaking 'other languages' were referring to their (non-Tamil) ancestral languages, this would imply that up to a quarter of non-Tamil Indians in Singapore use mainly their ancestral language in the home.

About half of Indians in Singapore predominantly use a non-Indian language in the home. 39% spoke mainly English, in contrast to 28.1% nationally. This made English the most spoken language in Indian homes, by a small margin. A further 10.6% of Indians reported speaking mainly Malay in their homes. It is likely that most are Indian Muslims married to ethnic Malays. Although they are counted as Indian in official statistics, a substantial number of these people consider themselves to be ethnically and culturally Malay, and many of them may be racially mixed.

== Tamil language in Singapore ==
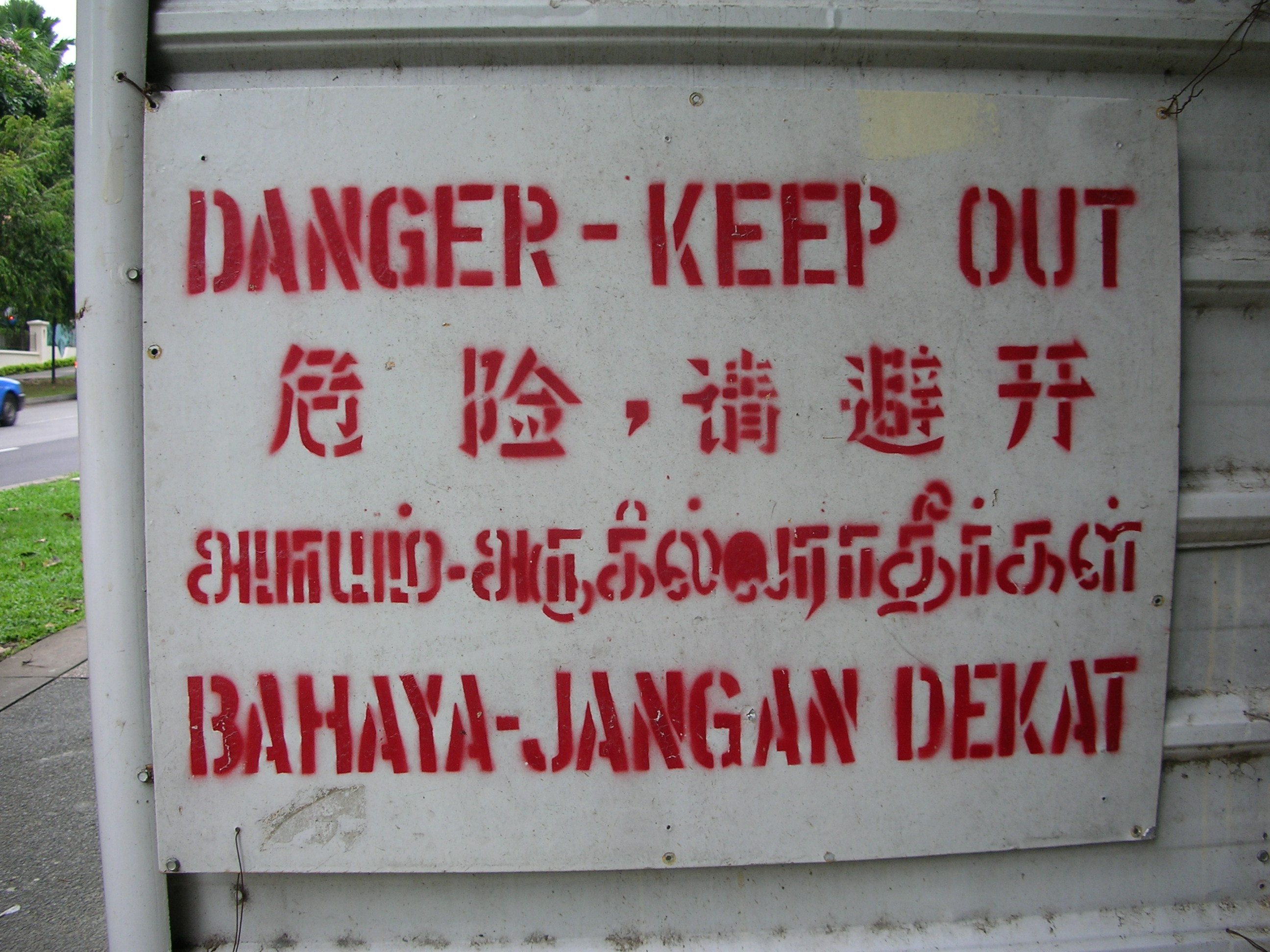
Official languages (from top): English, Chinese, Tamil, Malay.

Tamil is the most spoken Indian language in Singapore and the only Indian language among Singapore's four official languages, alongside Mandarin, Malay and English, and 3.1% of Singapore residents speak Tamil at home. Singapore is one of the three countries in the world to make Tamil an official language, the others being India and Sri Lanka.

As part of Singapore's bilingual education policy, Tamil is offered as a second language option in most public schools. As part of a policy to subsidise minority-language television programming, the government subsidises a free-to-air Tamil television channel (Vasantham). Similarly, as part of the policy of the National Library Board, community lending libraries in Singapore, as well as the national-level Lee Kong Chian Reference Library, maintain sections of books in all four official languages, including Tamil.

Singapore has a commercially run Tamil language daily newspaper, Tamil Murasu. Although Tamil Murasu was founded as an independent private newspaper by Thamizhavel G. Sarangapani, it has since become part of the Singapore Press Holdings group, which includes the Straits Times as part of its stable. Other Tamil media include the (Sun TV) cable television channel, provided by the main cable television operator in Singapore, StarHub, and the local Tamil-language radio station (Oli 96.8FM), which is run by the state-owned MediaCorp broadcasting company.

Tamil movies are screened in some cinemas, with the Rex Cinemas chain specializing in them. Major blockbusters are occasionally shown in selected Cathay and Golden Village cinemas. The country also has a Tamil theatre scene in the form of groups like Agni Koothu and the Ravindran Drama Group. There is also a small Tamil literary scene. Two Tamil language writers and two Tamil language theatre practitioners have won Cultural Medallions, the nation's highest arts award. Tamil is used in temples, mosques and churches catering to the community. Some business and non-profit groups, especially those in the Little India neighbourhood, use Tamil on a daily basis.

== Other Indian languages ==
Since 1990, public school students were able to take Hindi or some other Indian languages as their second language in major examinations, whereas previously only official languages like Tamil were offered. Students of other non-Tamil Indian language communities can choose to offer Bengali, Gujarati, Hindi, Punjabi or Urdu as their Mother-Tongue at the Primary School Leaving Examination (PSLE) and the GCE ‘N’, ‘O’ and ‘A’ level examinations Mother-Tongue Language Policy. As with the Tamil community, the other Indian communities also support a number of community groups for the promotion of social and cultural activities catering to each community. For more on this, see Jain & Wee (2018, 2019).

== Influence on other local languages ==
Given the long period of contact between India and the region, as well as the multifarious contact over the centuries between Britain, India, Malaya and China (especially Hong Kong), Indian influences have crept into a variety on non-Indian Singapore languages through a number of paths -

- Loan words in the Malay language (during the 'Indianisation' of ancient Southeast Asia). There are a very large number of such words, but a few examples include 'bumi' (or 'earth', from the Sanskrit 'bhumi'), 'kapal' (or 'ship', from the Tamil 'kappal') and 'katil' (or 'bed', from the Tamil 'kattil'). Also, some Malay words that have entered into Singlish (and sometimes Singapore Hokkien and Mandarin), are terms which were originally Indian loan words. These include 'suka' (or 'happiness'), 'roti' (or 'bread'), and 'sama' (or 'same'). In addition, there are words in the English that are derived from Malay, but which in turn are derived from Sanskrit originals. These include such words as camphor and mandarin.
- Ancient and colonial-era Indian loan words in Standard English. Examples include candy, cash, shampoo, bungalow and pyjama. Some colonial-era Indian loan words entered into Malay and/or Chinese, in addition to English. Some of these may be considered archaic in Standard English today. These include congee, godown, amah, karang guni / gunny sack, coolie.
- The influence of Indian teachers of English in Singapore schools, who brought elements of Indian English pronunciation, syntax, etc. into Singapore English. Dr Adam Brown, a professor of phonetics and linguistics, writes "It may surprise many readers to think that Singapore English is heavily influenced by Indian English. However, English had been spoken in India for at least a century before Raffles established Singapore for the East India Company in 1819, and Singapore was administered as part of India for most of the 19th century. Also, as Ho & Platt (1993) and Gupta (1994) note, many teachers in Singapore were of Indian origin. Between 1920 and 1940, for example, there were similar numbers of Indian and European teachers in English-medium schools in Singapore, and Indians have always been well represented in the teaching profession."
