= Singapore Tamils =

Migrant group from the Indian subcontinent

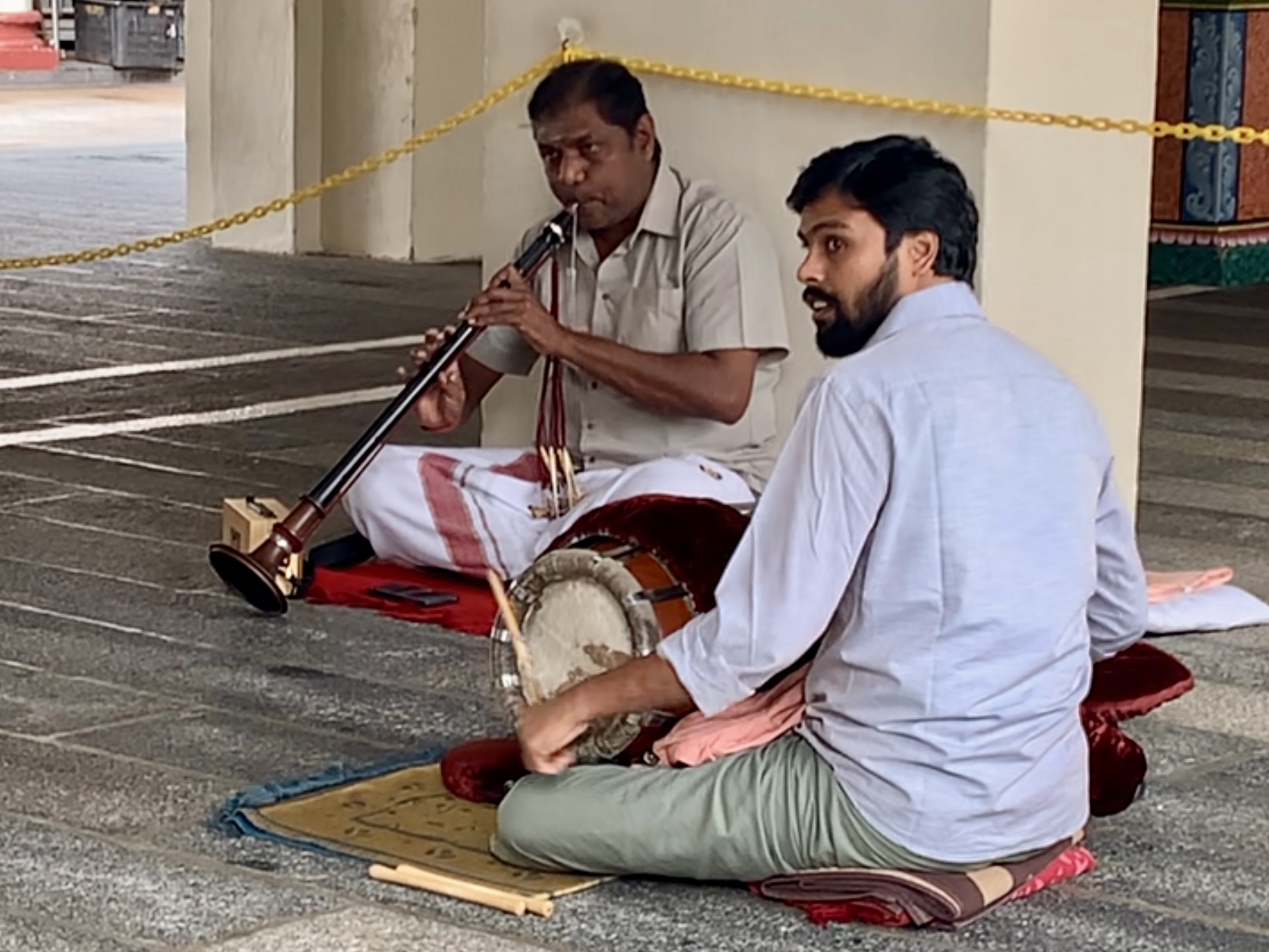
Two men performing Kirtan with a Nadaswaram and a Thavil at Sri Mariamman Temple, a prominent Tamil Hindu temple in Singapore.

Singapore Tamils primarily come from the South Indian state of Tamil Nadu and the union territory Puducherry, with some originating from Sri Lanka. Singapore has emerged as the most preferred destination among migrants from Tamil Nadu. A study has revealed that 410,000 of the 2.2 million Tamil Nadu diaspora were residing in Singapore in 2015. Ethnic Tamils also make up the majority of both Singapore's Indian and Sri Lankan communities.

== Demographics ==
According to the Singapore Census of Population 2020, ethnic Tamils constitute approximately 54 per cent of the Indian Singaporean resident population, which itself makes up 9.0 per cent of Singapore's total resident population as of 2020. Tamil is the most widely spoken Indian language in Singapore and the only Indian language among Singapore's four official languages, spoken at home by approximately 2.5 per cent of all Singapore residents in 2020.

The proportion of Indian residents speaking Tamil at home declined from 36.7 per cent in 2010 to 27.4 per cent in 2020, reflecting a broader shift towards English as the dominant home language across Singapore's Indian community.

== Status ==
Tamil is one of the four official languages of Singapore. Tamil is taught as a second language in most government schools from primary to junior college levels. Tamil is an examinable subject at all major nationwide exams. There is a daily Tamil newspaper printed in Singapore, Tamil Murasu. There is a full-time radio station, Oli 96.8FM, and a full-fledged television channel, Vasantham.

== Little India ==
Little India, Singapore is an ethnic place of Indians located in the east of Singapore and mostly follows the Tamil cultural heritage system.

== See also ==
- Indian Singaporeans
- Tamil diaspora
- Sri Lankan Tamil Diaspora
- Malayasia Tamil
