= Thamizhavel G. Sarangapani =

Thamizhavel Go. Sarangapani
- Born: 20 April 1903; Thiruvarur, Madras Presidency, British India
- Died: 16 March 1974 (aged 70); Singapore
- Other name: Ko.Sa
- Occupations: Tamil writer, journalist and publisher
- Agent: Tamil Murasu

Thamizhavel Go. Sarangapani, (Tamil: தமிழவேள் கோ. சாரங்கபாணி, 20 April 1903 – 16 March 1974) or Kosa as he was also known, a Tamil writer and publisher, was born in Thiruvarur, Tamil Nadu, on 20 April 1903. He received a good education and was effectively bi-lingual in Tamil and English. At 21, he went to Singapore to work as a bookkeeper, eventually becoming the manager at his firm.

Sarangapani was deeply influenced by E. V. Ramasami (better known as Periyar) and his Self-Respect Movement in Tamil Nadu. He was committed to rationalism and the ideal of a modern, progressive society. Sarangapani established direct contact with the Self-Respect Movement in India when he became the agent in British Malaya (then including Singapore) for the distribution of its magazine, Kudi Arasu. These links were strengthened in 1929 and 1954, when he helped to arrange Periyar's visits to Singapore and Malaya to spread his message to local Tamils.

Sarangapani was also active as a Tamil writer and publisher in his own right. In 1929 he set up the magazine Munnetram (Progress), and in 1935 he launched Tamil Murasu, which remains Singapore's only daily Tamil newspaper. He was also a founder of the Tamils Reform Association, and served as its Chairman and Secretary at various points. Through his publications and the Association, Sarangapani promoted the importance of education, as well as denouncing the Hindu caste system, superstitions and alcoholism.

Sarangapani was also a champion of the Tamil language in Singapore. He was part of campaigns to make Tamil one of the four official languages of Singapore, as well as having it taught in Singapore schools from the primary to tertiary level. He also helped set up the Department of Indian Studies at the University of Malaya in Singapore. Sarangapani also urged Tamils to embrace Singapore as their home. Former Singapore President Sellapan Ramanathan has noted that

...In the early 1950s Thamizhavel Sarangapany helped many members of the Indian community to register themselves as citizens of this country. He personally collected and distributed the application forms to those who were permanent residents and those who were stateless. The Indians who are now living in prosperous Singapore must never forget his efforts in encouraging and securing citizenships for them.

In 1937, he married Lim Boon Neo, with whom he had six children (four sons and two daughters). When he died on 16 March 1974, tributes were paid to him in Tamil Nadu, the land of his birth, in Malaysia and in Singapore. In 2004, Sarangapani's birth centenary was marked in Chennai, by tributes from leading Tamil poets, and a seminar on his life and achievements.
