= Tamil Murasu =

Tamil language newspaper in Singapore

- Type: Daily newspaper
- Format: Broadsheet
- Owner: SPH Media
- Founded: 2 May 1936; 90 years ago
- Language: Tamil
- Website: tamilmurasu.com.sg

Tamil Murasu (Tamil: தமிழ் முரசு) is a Singapore-based Tamil-language newspaper officially launched on 2 May 1936 by Thamizhavel G. Sarangapani, Tamil Murasu is Singapore's only Tamil-language newspaper. It is one of the sixteen newspapers in Singapore.

== Market Coverage ==
Readership* 154,000 (Print + Digital)
Circulation^ 16,000 (Mon-Sun)
* Media Nielsen Research Media Index 2013 ^ Average Circulation Jan-Nov 2013

== History ==
Thamizhavel G. Sarangapani officially launched Tamil Murasu on 2 May 1936 as his second publication (after Seerthirutham (Reform) in 1929 and before Munnetram (Progress) in 1939) pricing it at 1 cent per copy to accommodate the lower economic status of the Tamil community at the time. Starting as a weekly from 1937 onward it was published daily. A reformist, Sarangapani advocated for positions similar to Periyar, decrying discrimination from the British and Malays as well as calling for increased labor rights for workers and changing the political state of Tamils in Singapore. Tamil Murasu reduced the dominance of English-educated upper-class Brahmins in Singaporean Tamil journalism.

1952: Student supplement Manavar Murasu is launched.

1963: Labour unrest disrupts operations for the first time since the Japanese Occupation.

1991: Singapore Press Holdings (SPH) takes over distribution of Tamil Murasu.

1993: Hipro Printing, Tamil Murasu's family-owned publisher, is incorporated

1995: SPH and Times Publishing buy Hipro Printing. This makes Tamil Murasu the last daily paper in Singapore that was not owned by SPH.

1999: Youth page Ilyar Murasu is launched.

2000: Tamil Murasu webpage is launched.

2004: SPH buys Times Publishing's share of Hipro, making it a wholly owned SPH subsidiary.

2005: Hirpo Printing is renamed Tamil Murasu.

2006: Tamil Murasu celebrates its 70th anniversary.

2008: Weekly English tabloid tabla! is launched.

2011: Tamil Murasu celebrates its 75th anniversary.

2016: Tamil Murasu celebrates its 80th anniversary.

2017: Balar Murasu, a fortnightly supplement for pre-schoolers, is launched. Tamil Murasu becomes part of SPH's English/Malay/Tamil Media Group.

2019: The Tamil Murasu website receives a revamp.

2021: Tamil Murasu celebrates its 85th anniversary and starts distributing copies of their "Manavar Murasu" supplement to all schools in Singapore.

== See also ==
- Vasantham
- Oli 968
