= 1999 in Singapore =

- Decades: 1970s; 1980s; 1990s; 2000s; 2010s
- See also: Other events of 1999; Timeline of Singaporean history

The following lists events that happened during 1999 in the Republic of Singapore.

== Incumbents ==
- President: Ong Teng Cheong (until 1 September), S. R. Nathan (starting 1 September)
- Prime Minister: Goh Chok Tong

== Events ==
=== January ===
- January – Delhaize buys up to a 49% stake in Shop N Save, with QAF Limited retaining the rest.
- 11 January – Powergrid's 400 kV transmission system is commissioned.
- 21 January – StarHub acquires Cyberway, an ISP. It is rebranded to StarHub Internet on 3 December.
- 29 January – Construction starts on the Changi Airport Line (CAL), targeted for completion by 2001.

=== February ===
- 2 February – Creative Resource, Creative Technology's new headquarters is officially opened in International Business Park.
- 11 February – The Environmental Pollution Control Act is passed to replace the Clean Air Act, giving the Ministry of the Environment (ENV) more powers to deal with pollution.

=== March ===
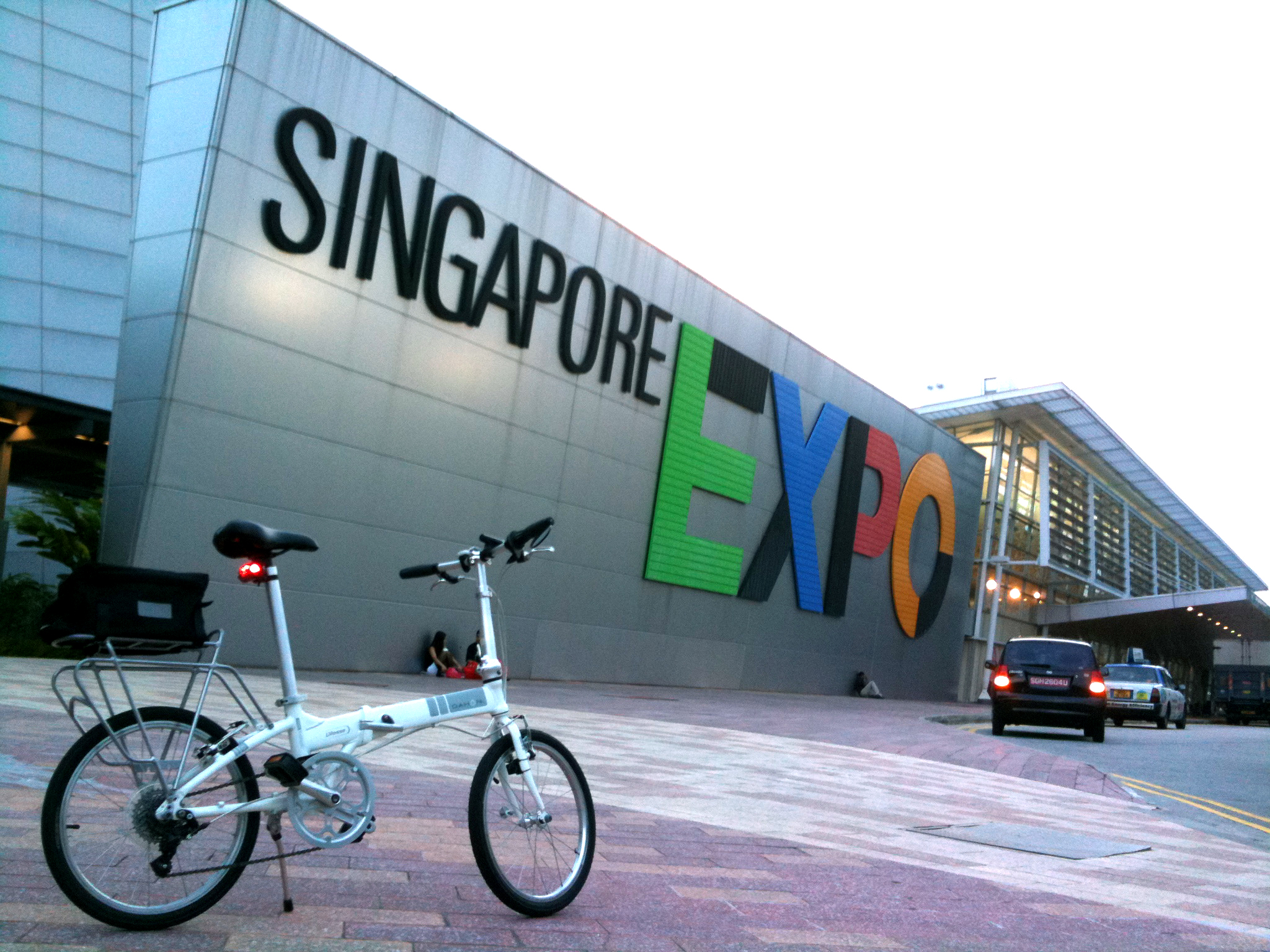
Singapore Expo

- 4 March – Singapore Expo is officially opened, making it the largest meetings, incentives, conferencing, exhibitions (MICE) venue in Singapore. This comes after some exhibition space in World Trade Centre had to make way for the North East MRT line.
- 26 March – The Civil Defence Academy is officially opened.
- 31 March – Lorong Halus Dumping Ground is closed.

=== April ===
- 1 April –
  - Semakau landfill begin operations after the closure of the Lorong Halus Dumping Ground.
  - The Building and Construction Authority is formed from a merger of Construction Industry Development Board and Public Works Department's Building Control Division to develop and regulate Singapore's construction industry and ensure safe buildings, with some functions transferred to the Urban Redevelopment Authority. On the same day, PWD Corporation (present-day CPG Corporation) is formed from a corporatisation.
  - The Juvenile Court moves to the Subordinate Courts building.

=== May ===
- 11 May – The Ministry of Education announced a new Programme for Rebuilding and Improving Existing schools (PRIME) to upgrade or rebuild existing schools, ensuring all schools have access to modern and conducive learning environments.
- 17 May – The Monetary Authority of Singapore announced rules that liberalise commercial banking and help take local banks to new heights. They include a five-year liberalisation programme with new Qualifying Full Bank (QFB) licences, increase the number of restricted banks here and greater flexibility for offshore banks' wholesale business, all local banks having Nominating Committees to strengthen corporate governance and the lifting of 40 percent limit on foreigners' shareholding in banks.
- 20 May – The North East MRT line (NEL) and the Sengkang and Punggol LRT lines are awarded to Singapore Bus Service (present-day SBS Transit) to foster competition with SMRT, the first rail lines to be operated by SBS. In addition, SMRT and Trans-Island Bus Services (TIBS) will merge. As a result, SBS will take over bus operations in Sengkang and Punggol from TIBS with TIBS taking over bus services from SBS in Choa Chu Kang and Bukit Batok.
- 30 May - Causeway Point shopping mall in Woodlands is officially opened.

=== June ===
- 1 June – The National Neuroscience Institute starts operations.
- 13–16 June – Singapore hosts the 1999 Rotary Convention.
- 21 June – SingPost and CISCO signed an agreement to create a new certification authority for e-commerce, thereby increasing security.
- 26 June – The National Sailing Centre is officially opened.

=== July ===
- 18 July – The new Woodlands Checkpoint starts operations.
- 21 July – DataOne (D1) is awarded a licence to run an ISP network in Singapore, thus making D1 the fourth operator after SingNet, Pacific Internet and Cyberway. The ISP commenced operations in November.
- 25 July – Transfer of bus services 864, 865 and 866 to SBS, and transfer of bus service 190 to TIBS.

=== August ===
- 12 August – The Underground Ammunition Facility starts construction, which will be ready by 2003. It eventually opened in 2008.
- 17 August – The SAF Basic Military Training Centre is officially opened on Pulau Tekong.
- 18 August – Nomination Day for the 1999 Presidential Election: S.R. Nathan won the election via an uncontested walkover since he was the only candidate eligible to contest in the election. Nathan was sworn in as the sixth President of Singapore on 1 September.

=== September ===
- Eng Wah closes its White Sands cinema due to low patronage.
- 9 September – The Portrait Series notes are officially launched.
- 11 September – The SAR 21 rifle is launched.
- 14 September 1999 – In the first case of kidnapping by ransom for over a decade, 33-year-old Vincent Lee Chuan Leong and his two Chinese accomplices Zhou Jian Guang and Shi Song Jing kidnapped a 14-year-old schoolgirl for a ransom of S$330,000. All three were arrested, and sentenced to life imprisonment.

=== October ===
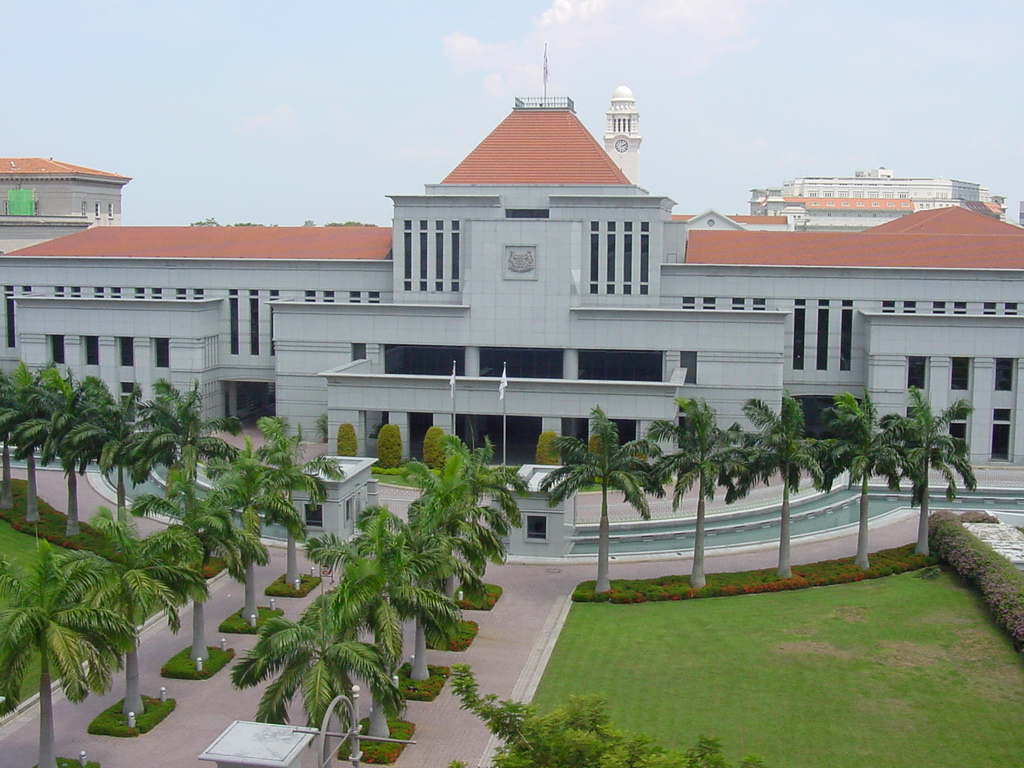
Parliament House

- 4 October – The new Parliament House is officially opened.
- 18 October – The merger between TIBS and SMRT fails to go through.
- 20 October – The Monetary Authority of Singapore awards four foreign banks with Qualifying Full Bank (QFB) licences, which are ABN Amro, Banque Nationale de Paris (present day BNP Paribas), Citibank, and Standard Chartered. Another eight banks are awarded Qualifying Offshore Bank (QOB) licences. In addition, eight new Restricted Banks (RB) are announced, with 4 RBs to start operations immediately and another 4 more from 1 October 2000. MAS will eventually award up to 20 RB licences compared to 18 previously after a high demand from banks.
- 21 October – library@orchard officially opens in Ngee Ann City, operating until its closure in 2007.
- 22 October – ST Engineering announces the acquisition of Chartered Industries of Singapore through ST Auto, now called ST Kinetics. The acquisition will help make ST Engineering a successful world-class engineering company.

=== November ===
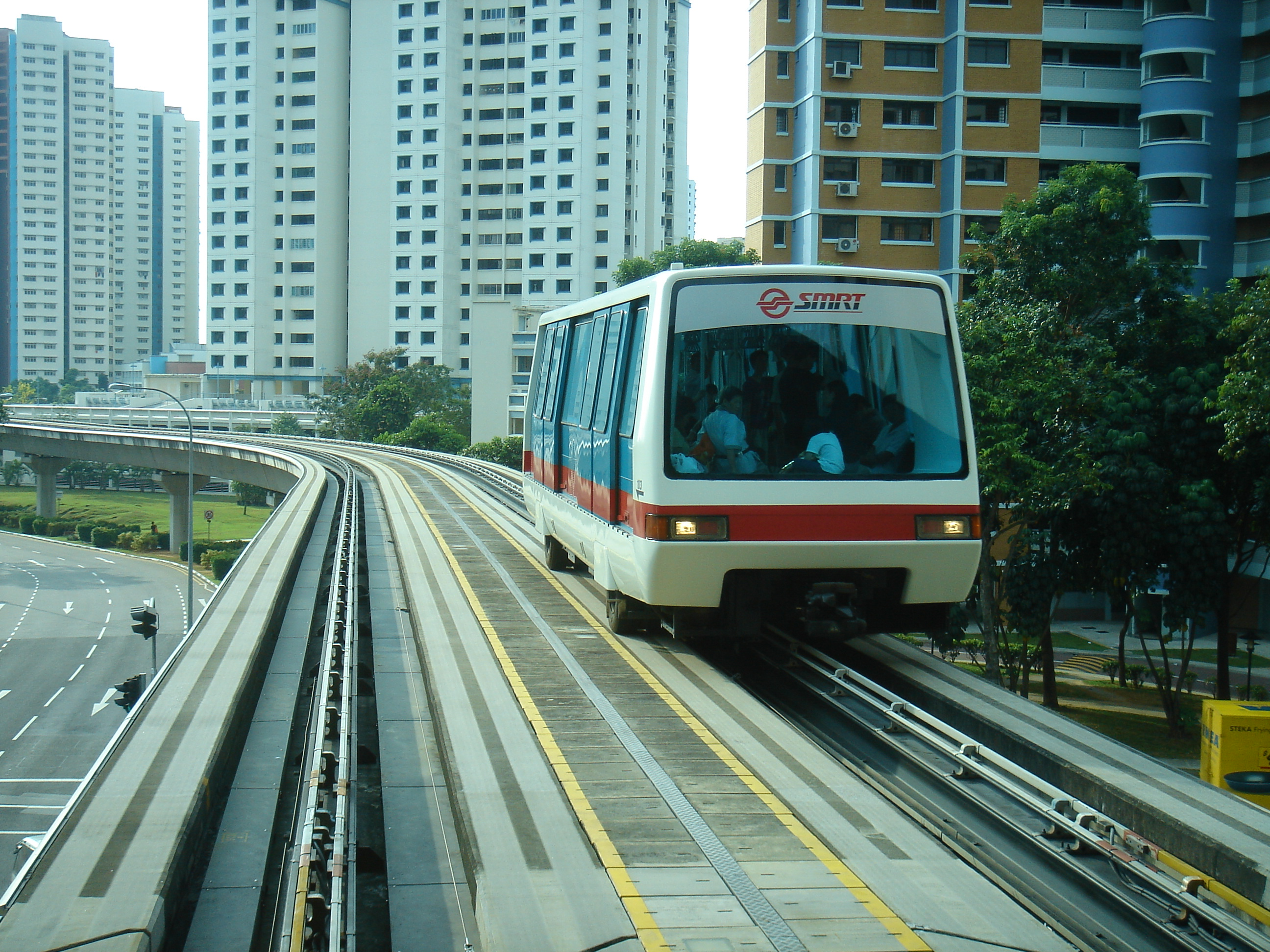
Bukit Panjang LRT

- 6 November – The Bukit Panjang LRT line opens.
- 18 November –
  - The Ministry of Health announced the formation of two healthcare clusters known as the Eastern (SingHealth) and Western (National Healthcare Group) Networks, which will take effect in 2000.
  - Golden Village opens its ninth multiplex at Eastpoint.
- 19 November – Smart Radio, a digital audio broadcasting (DAB) service is launched in Singapore.
- 30 November – Singapore Power launches a new website CAN.COM.SG.

=== December ===
- 1 December –
  - The Infocomm Development Authority of Singapore is launched from a merger between the National Computer Board and the Telecommunication Authority of Singapore to take charge of Singapore's infocomm sector.
  - The Singapore Exchange (SGX) is formed from the merger of Stock Exchange of Singapore (SES), Singapore International Monetary Exchange (Simex) and Securities Clearing and Computer Services Pte Ltd (SCCS), first announced on 4 August.
- 28 December – Keppel Land and PSA Corporation (now Mapletree) start construction of the HarbourFront office towers, which is completed in 2003.
- 31 December –
  - The redevelopment of Changi Prison starts, eventually having consolidated clusters and facilities to optimise land use.
  - The Antarctica 2000 team becomes the first Singapore team to reach the South Pole after a 1,125 km trek.

=== Date unknown ===
- The last quarry on Pulau Ubin is closed.
- Hougang 1 and Rivervale Plaza are officially opened to the public.
- Woodlands Mart and Woodlands North Plaza are completed and opened to the public.
- Agri-Food and Veterinary Authority of Singapore announced that they have banned the exports of pig blood curd, in response to the 1998–1999 Malaysia Nipah virus outbreak. The ban would last until 27 years later on 1 April 2026.

== Deaths ==
- 8 January – Punch Coomaraswamy, High Court judge and envoy (b. 1925).
- 23 February – Pan Shou, Chinese calligrapher and poet (b. 1911).
- 1 March – Khoo Eng An, 5th Commander of the Republic of Singapore Navy (b. 1926).
- 11 March – Rahmat Kenap, former PAP Member of Parliament for Geylang Serai Constituency (b. 1925).
- 20 March – G. Kandasamy, veteran trade unionist and former PAP legislative assemblyman for Kampong Kapor Constituency (b. 1921).
- 25 March – Koh Mew Chin, murder victim of Chan Choon Wai (b. 1981).
- 17 April – Ahmad Mohamed Ibrahim, 1st Attorney-General of Singapore (b. 1916).
- 21 April – T. Maniam, murder victim of Loganatha Venkatesan, Chandran Rajagopal, and Julaiha Begum (b. 1943).
- 2 May – S. Salim Ahmad, murder victim of Seah Kok Meng (b. 1943).
- 3 June – Andy Ang Wei Jie, murder victim in the Ang Mo Kio child abuse case (b. 1991–1992).
- 8 June – Muhammad Taha bin Fadhlullah Suhaimi, prominent figure in the Muslim community (b. 1916).
- 24 June – Ong Tiang Wee, former Chairman of the Straits Chinese British Association and later Peranakan Association (b. 1909).
- 28 June – Dewan Singh Randhawa, former owner, publisher and editor of Punjabi newspaper Navjiwan and a leading member of the Sikh community (b. 1911).
- 21 July – M. Karthigesu, judge of appeal (b. 1923).
- 30 July – Ling Siew May, First Lady of Singapore and wife of 5th President Ong Teng Cheong (b. 1937).
- 21 August – Paddy Chew, actor and HIV patient (b. 1960).
- 28 August – Ho Rih Hwa, businessman and ambassador (b. 1917).
- 4 September – Lee Kim Chuan, journalist, poet and member of Force 136 during WW2 (b. 1916).
- 7 September – Lim Shee Ping, former Barisan Sosialis politician (b. 1931).
- 19 September – Kee Soon Bee, national swimming and water polo coach (b. 1919).
- 28 September – A. P. Rajah, Singapore's first High Commissioner to UK and first Supreme Court judge to remain after 70 (b. 1911).
- 19 October – Robert Black, 3rd Governor of Singapore (b. 1906).
- 1 December – Hsu Tse Kwang, former tax commissioner for 21 years (b. 1929).
