= Sikhism in Singapore =

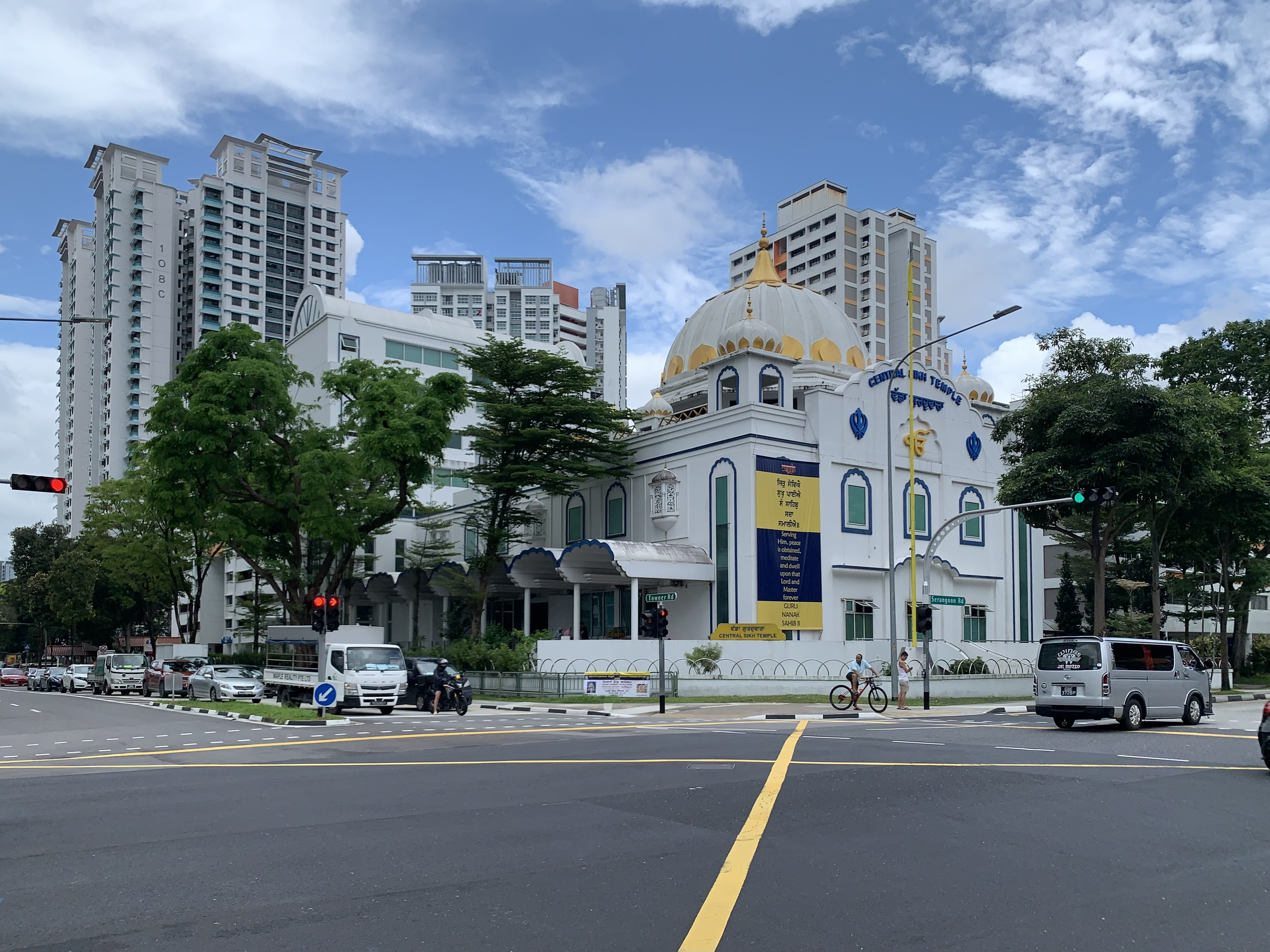
- Central Sikh Temple

Total population
- 12,000 to 15,000 (2020); 0.3% of the resident (Note: In Singapore, the term "resident" refers to both citizens and permanent residents (PRs).) population

Religions
- Predominantly Sikhism (Note: Although Sikhs are primarily defined as an ethnoreligious group, a distinction is often made between Sikh ethnic identity and religious adherence. Individuals of Sikh ancestry may identify with the community's cultural and historical heritage without practicing the faith, while others may adhere to different religions while maintaining their ethnic Sikh identity.)

Languages
- Malay • Mandarin • Punjabi • English

Singaporean Sikhs are an ethnoreligious group forming a minority community in Singapore. Sikhism has been present in Singapore for centuries, particularly through the service of Sikhs in the military and police forces of the British Empire. There are about 12,000–15,000 practising Sikhs in Singapore, most of whom are ethnic Punjabis. The community maintains eight gurdwaras, as well as a missionary society, a welfare society, two youth organisations and two sports clubs.

During the period when Singapore was part of the Straits Settlements, Sikhs migrated from the Punjab region to work as policemen under British rule. Many left their homeland due to poverty and debt, seeking better prospects across the Empire. The early Sikhs were commonly employed in law enforcement and security occupations, such as policemen, guards or watchmen. Over time, and especially after World War II, they began to enter business and white-collar professions that includes finance and law.

== History ==
=== Overview ===
Sikh settlement of Singapore was part of the greater Sikh settlement of Malaya (including the Malay states and the Straits Settlements) that was facilitated by the British Empire, with their settlement occurring in three distinct waves (minus the earliest migrants, who arrived as convicts and differed from later arrivals). The three waves are as follows:

- First wave occurred between the 1870s and 1914, with Sikhs of the British Indian Army working in Singapore for security and policing roles in the Straits Settlements Police Force
- Second wave occurred between 1914 and 1945, with educated, business-minded Sikhs coming to Singapore to work in the colonial auxiliary services and as business-owners
- Third wave occurred from 1945 to the 1950s, with it consisting of partition-refugees, family-reunifications, and regional twice-migrations, such as from Thai Sikhs

The Sikh settlers in the colonial-period mostly derived from the peasantry of the Majha, Malwa, and Doab regions of British Punjab. Most of the Sikhs of Singapore today are descended from Sikhs who arrived during the colonial-period as there has been little modern migration of Sikhs from India or elsewhere to Singapore.

=== 19th century ===
==== Earliest arrivals ====
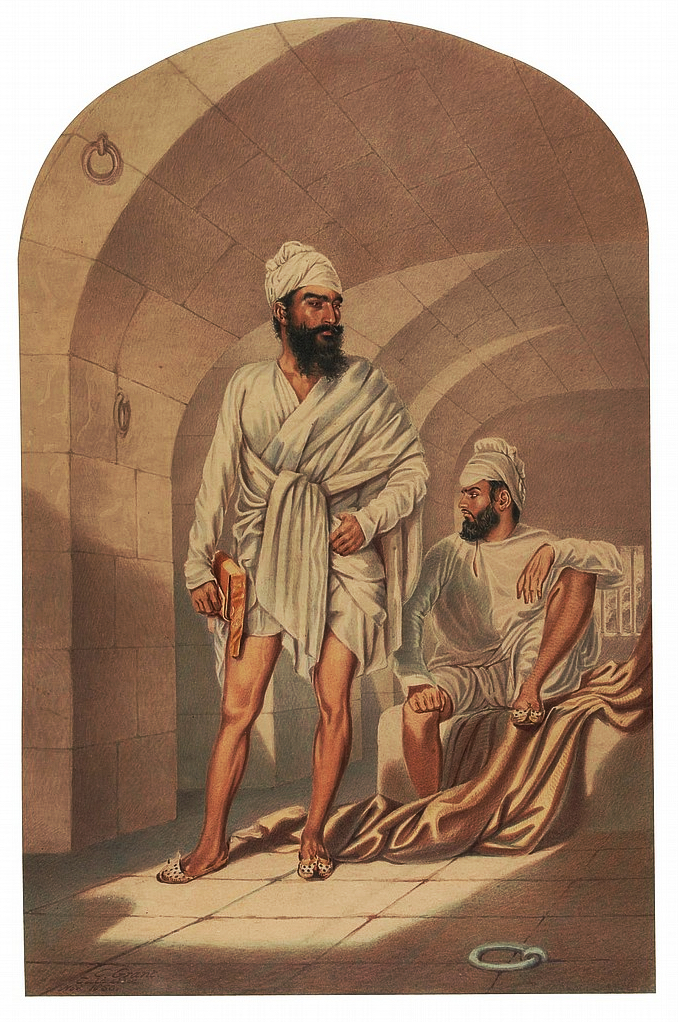
Bhai Maharaj Singh (standing) and Companion (Khurruck Singh, seated on right) in a Prison Cell. Painted in Calcutta in November 1850. Maharaj Singh and his companion were the first Sikhs in Singapore on record.

The earliest Sikhs in Singapore arrived as convicts in the 1850s. Some of the first Sikhs to migrate, albeit not voluntarily, to Singapore were Maharaj Singh and Khurruck Singh in 1850; Maharaj Singh was sent there as a political prisoner by the British Empire after the Second Anglo-Sikh War. They both arrived in Singapore on 14 June 1850 whilst other sources claim their date of arrival in Singapore to be 9 July 1850. Maharaj Singh has been positioned by the Singaporean Sikh community as their antecedent and founding figure in an effort to establish the community's historical link to Singapore. He has become a popularly venerated figure, respected as a martyr, saint, and miracle-worker.

Aside from them, there is scant evidence of a prominent Sikh presence in Singapore prior to 1881, however Tan Tai Yong speculates that some Sikhs may have been present in Singapore from the time of the earliest British settlement in the early 19th century as sepoys, domestic servants, and convicts. According to Yong, Sikhs began migrating out of the Punjab for economic reasons ever since its annexation in 1849 by the British.

In the second half of the 19th century, the majority of Sikh migrants to Singapore were employed in the police or security forces. When these migrants returned to their native villages in Punjab on vacation, they spread word about the prospects of Singapore for settlement, leading more of their kind to come, increasing the Sikh diaspora in Singapore.

This marked the start of a proper Sikh community in Singapore as prior to this, the Sikhs that were sent here were convicts as Singapore served as a convict colony, and did not form a community. However, this stopped in 1857 when Andaman Islands became the new convict colony, since then, up till the formation of the Sikh Police Contingent, there were no records of Sikh migrants in Singapore.

==== Police and military recruits ====
A factor which led to Sikhs joining the military or migrating out of Punjab was also the local economic situation in Punjab during the British-rule. Due to the political stability and economic growth in the Punjab after its annexation by the British, profits from agricultural output increased which led to the prices for arable land to rise. Thus, peasants started to use land as a collateral to borrow money from moneylenders, especially in the Majha region. They used these funds to purchase more land, fund a conspicuous lifestyle, and pay their land revenue taxes. However, there was a risk of them losing their land if they could not pay off their loans, thus these Sikhs began to join the military to supplement their income, as military service provided regular pay and pensions. The British preferred to recruit Sikhs belonging to the Jat caste from particular districts in the Majha region. Many Sikhs who were not able to be recruited in the colonial military looked elsewhere and either set westward to the canal-colonies or moved abroad looking for work, such as in North America (Canada, USA) or in southeast Asia (Thailand, Malaya and the Straits Settlements).

The Sikhs were idealized as a martial race and admired by the British, especially after encountering how the Sikhs fought during the war against British in Punjab, also known as the First Anglo-Sikh War, which happened from 11 December 1845 to 9 March 1846. Jat Sikh recruitment into the Indian British military increased after the Sepoy Mutiny of 1857. The Sikhs were known as martial Indians, known for their bravery and their well-built body. The uprising of Singapore Societies along with the local police not deemed fit by the British lead to the recruitment of the Sikhs.

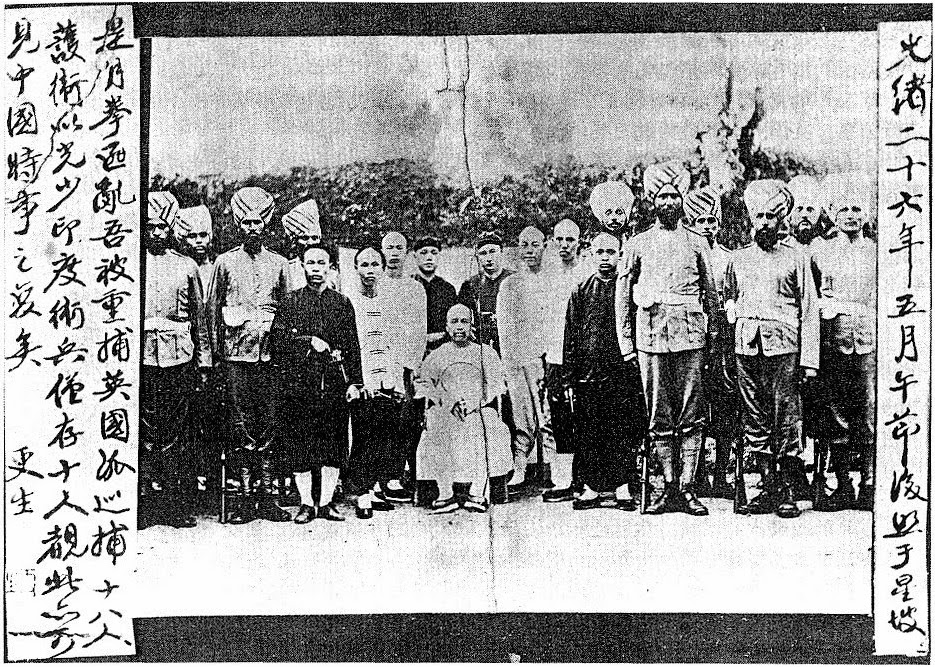
Qing-era Chinese political reformer and thinker Kang Youwei photographed with his Sikh guards in Singapore, ca.1897–1901

In 1879, the Commission of Enquiry of the Straits Settlement Police Force in Singapore made a recommendation for the recruitment of Sikhs from the Punjab for the purposes of policing Singapore. This led to the eventual establishment of the Sikh Police Contingent (SPC) in Singapore in 1881, with the first batch of 54 Sikh recruits arriving in Singapore on 26 March 1881 and another 65 in August that year. Around 200 Sikhs arrived to Singapore Island to form a new Sikh police contingent to augment the local police force. A total of 165 Sikhs from British Punjab arrived on the island to form the new police contingent in 1881. Thus, Sikhs began migrating to Singapore in-hopes of being recruited by the Straits Settlement Police Force. The Sikh policemen were deployed at the Tanjong Pagar Police Station as well as the Tanjong Pagar Dock Police Station. The Sikhs responsibility was to counter Chinese Secret Societies as well as the security of the docks, harbors and the godowns. However, not all Sikhs that arrived are recruited as policemen as the British had stringent requirements – recruit has to be younger than 25 years old, have a minimum height of 5 feet 6 inch (1.68m) and a minimum chest measurement of 33 inch (84 cm). On top of that, it was also revealed in the General Orders that only non-English educated Sikhs who came from the farming community (known as Jat Sikhs) are to be recruited. This is to ensure that the British will be able to control these Sikhs, as they were considered obedient and will follow blindly to those who they have taken the oath of obedience to. Hence, those who failed to be selected found work as security guards and watchmen with private employers.

In 1898, a Sikh from Hong Kong named Lal Singh acted as a leader for the community during meetings, successfully gathering funds for the establishment of a dharamshala.

At the time, Punjabis and Sikhs were not the only group of Indians in Singapore, there were also Tamils, Malayalis, Telugus, Ceylonese, Gujaratis, Sindhis, Biharis, and Bengalis.

=== 20th century ===
By the turn of the century, the community was still small but settled (concentrated in the town areas), and predominantly male. These were mostly transitory migrants who had no true intentions of permanently settling in Singapore, with them having the goal of eventually moving elsewhere or returning to their homeland. There were smaller amounts of Sikh females but they were usually the wives of Sikh policemen. The reason for limited amounts of Sikh females is due to the unfamiliar environment, lack of employment options, and the living standards. It was typical for married Sikh men to leave their wives back in Punjab and reside in Singapore without them or for single Singaporean-Sikh men to return to Punjab in-order to find a wife and get married, after they had saved-up enough funds for the purpose. Most Singaporean Sikhs in the early 20th century were employed as policemen, security guards, or caretakers. However, some Singaporean Sikhs at the time pursued work in agriculture, such as by being dairy farmers and bullock drivers and keeping some heads of cattle on the outskirts of town. Many of the Sikhs, especially watchmen, were working multiple jobs or side-hustles (especially in money-lending) in-order to bring-in as much income as possible and to send funds back to their homeland in the form of remittance. Some of them aimed to eventually return to Punjab as wealthy individuals and thus worked hard to achieve their dream. Often, retired policemen took-up new jobs as watchmen, which afforded them to become moneylenders as well. The Singaporean Sikh policemen were barracked at Pearl’s Hill whilst those working as watchmen or security-guards resided near their places of employment, which were usually go-downs, banks, and offices located within the municipal area.

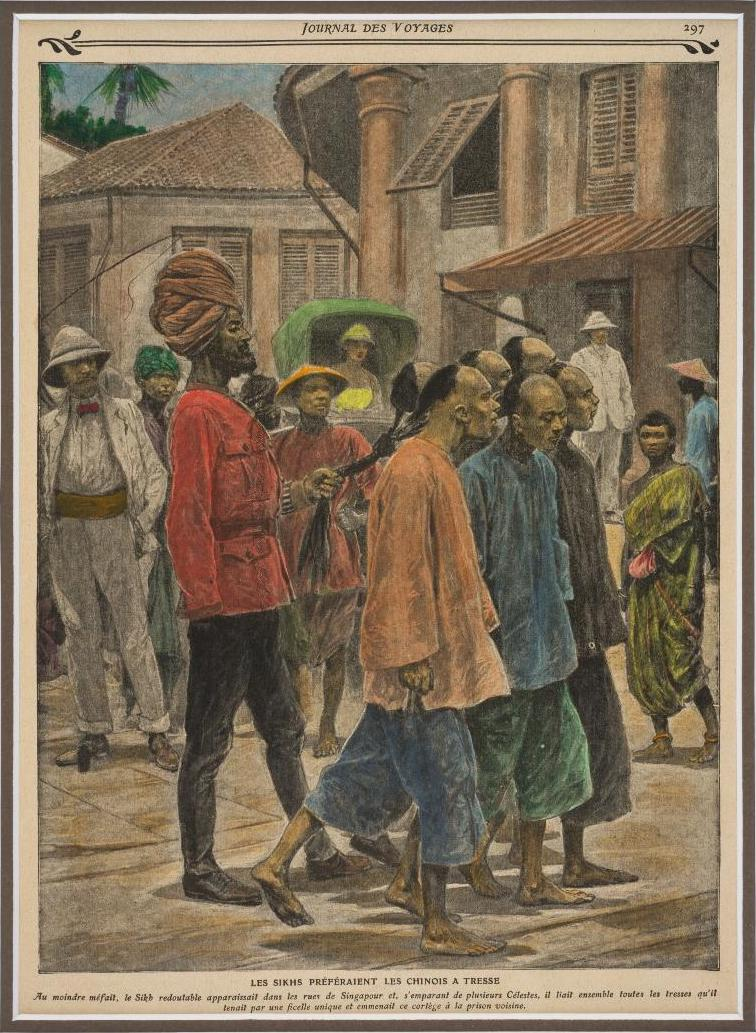
Print from Journal des Voyages depicting a Sikh policeman rounding up Chinese criminals by their queues in Singapore, made in Paris, 1912

In 1912, the Journal des Voyages published a satirical print of Sikh policemen rounding up Chinese criminals by their queues in Singapore. In 1915, the Sikh Advisory Board was formed as a government body to inform the government on issues related to Sikh religion and custom.

After WW1, especially in the 1920's and 1930's, a new type of Sikh commercial migrants started to arrive in Singapore, these were business-minded Sikhs who worked as petty traders, pedlars, shopkeepers, and merchants, particularly in textiles. They are to be distinguished from the Jat Sikh migrants sourced from the peasantry that had characterized and dominated the ranks of the prior Sikh arrivers. They started to build-up commercial enterprises, such as in textiles, which catered to both the Indian and European segments of the Singaporean population as wholesalers and retailers. Singapore was sort-of a second-choice for Sikh textile workers, as they preferred Bangkok in Thailand, which was the distribution centre of the textile trade in SE Asia. In 1931, the Singapore Khalsa Association was founded by young Sikh Singaporeans who wanted an organisation that met their needs, such as by hosting educational lectures and discourses on Sikh topics and also sports.

During the Japanese occupation of Singapore from 1942–45, the Gurdwara Sahib Silat Road housed war widows and orphans. The Sikh Police Contingent of Singapore was abolished in 1945.

Post-1945, more Sikh commercial migrants arrived due to the aftermath of the partition of Punjab, with some urban Sikh refugees from West Punjab moving abroad to Singapore, Malaya and Thailand, and also due to increased business opportunities as the Korean War raged-on. From 1950–52, many Sikh businessmen from Bangkok moved to Singapore to benefit from the better banking system. Some of the Sikh-owned textile business in this era were Hardial Singh & Co. and Gian Singh & Co. After the independence of India in 1947, it became difficult for Indian Sikhs to migrate to Singapore due to the imposition of Indian citizenship on inhabitants of India and the enactment of the 1953 Immigration Ordinance introduced by the British colonial authorities in Malaya, thus Indian Sikh migration to Singapore mostly ended in the late 1950s.

After the creation of Singapore in 1965, local Sikhs worked in the paramilitary and civilian police forces, the railways, in road construction, as dairy farmers, security guards, clerical staff, and as cart drivers, with lesser numbers being involved in small businesses and money-lending. Lee Kuan Yee praised the Singaporean Sikh community in 1967 for their efforts in developing Singapore. The Sikh Advisory Board became a statutory body under the Ministry of Community Development of the Singaporean government. Sikhs are on good-terms with the Singaporean government but there was strain during the 1984 Operation Blue Star incident and Punjab insurgency. However, the Sikh Advisory Board conducted the Seminar on Sikh Youth and Nation Building in the 1980s to deal with the controversies of the era related to Sikh radicalisation and Khalistani separatism. In 1979, the Sikh revivalist organization Sikh Sewaks Singapore was established, which operates sammelans (religious/cultural camps) to cater to the Sikh youth, such as the Youth Kirtan Darbar and its Bahadur Bachey ("brave children") camps. The group worked with the Sikh Dharma of the Western Hemisphere (3HO) organization at some points, which led to the introduction of yoga and bhajan to Singaporean Sikhs.

In 1989, the Singaporean government declared the Punjabi language as a mother tongue to be studied. The facilitate the learning of the language, the Singapore Sikh Education Foundation was founded in 1990, with four Punjabi learning centres being established by the early 1990s. One school is the Khalsa Punjabi School of the Singapore Khalsa Association. In 1995, the Sikh Welfare Council was set up to assist downtrodden sections of the community.

=== 21st century ===
The Sikh Centre was established in 2000 to cater to the religious, cultural, economic, and educational needs of the Singaporean Sikhs. It hosts the Gurmat Sangeet Academy. For parental and children's education and development, it hosts the Sikhi for Children and Raising a Sikh Child programes. In 2003, the Young Sikh Association was founded to help the youth navigate modern Singapore while maintaining their Sikh identity. The Central Sikh Temple was built to commemorate the 518th anniversary of Guru Nanak, the first Sikh guru. The temple boasts a skilful blend of modern and traditional architecture. The Guru Granth Sahib, or holy book, is enshrined in a prayer hall which has a 13-metre wide dome. The Singapore Khalsa Association manages the observances of Vaisākhī and Lohṛī. The association has a women's wing and a youth wing (Young Khalsa). Some prevalent Singaporean Sikhs include Kartar Singh Thakral (Thakral Holdings), Choor Singh (supreme court judge), Daveinder Singh (member of parliament), Inderjit Singh (member of parliament), Pritam Singh (member of parliament), and Ravinder Singh (chief of army).

Whilst in the latter half of the 20th century Indian Sikh migrants have settled in Western countries, they have seldom settled in Singapore and other southeast Asian countries due to the local governments of these countries discouraging transnational migration of Indian Sikhs to their state. However, the IT industry and the financial and services sectors in the 21st century has attracted some Indian Sikh immigrants to Singapore but they do not interact much with the local Sikh descended from colonial-era settlers. The community has been praised for its advancements made in Singaporean society whilst still holding onto its cultural and religious traditions. The Sikhs are heavily integrated professionally and economically and have comparatively high amounts of resources when compared to other Indo-Singaporean communities. They place a heavy focus on English-language education. However, there is a decline of Punjabi and Sikh cultural traditions, especially amongst the younger generations, due to this globalization of their lifestyle, declining attendances at gurdwaras and other Sikh sites/festivals, and also issues related to drugs, crimes, sexual abuse, and religious conversion. The Marriage Preparatory Course was introduced at the Central Sikh Temple to assist Sikh couples experiencing relationship issues. Whilst caste and regional divisions still exist amongst the Singaporean Sikh community, these issues are less influential amongst the younger cohort of Sikhs, with a common division being based upon generations.

== Gurdwaras ==
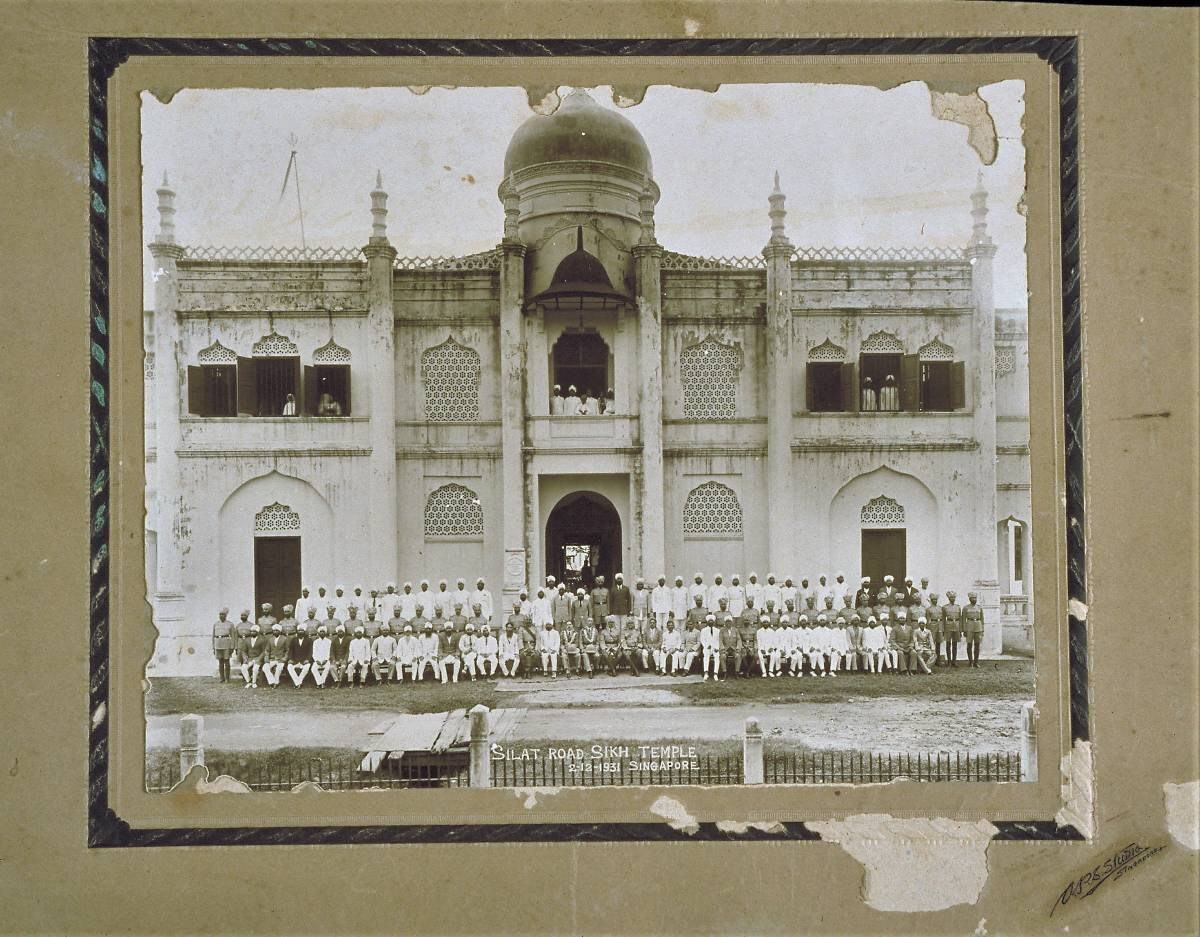
Photograph of members of the Sikh Police Contingent in-front of Gurdwara Sahib Silat Road in 1931. The gurdwara is also known as Singapore Sikh Police Temple. Also pictured is the inspector/general of police.

With the increasingly stable settlement of Sikhs in Singapore, gurdwaras began to be established in locations where the Sikhs were present. The gurdwaras were not only places of worship but also functioned as community-centres for the Sikh community. Within the gurdwaras, there were social, educational, and other charitable activities ongoing and the gurdwara space was used as a place for the community to hold dialogue about important topics both locally and regarding their homeland. New immigrants freshly landed in Singapore were welcomed at the gurdwaras, which helped them set-up their new life in Singapore by giving them initial shelter and lodging and the temples provided free meals in the form of langar (communal kitchen) to travellers and immigrants.

In the 1880s, a Sikh place of worship was built at the Pearl Hill Barracks. The first known gurdwara was established by the Sikh Police Contingent at Pearl’s Hill. Prior to this temple's establishment, the Sikh policemen of Pearl's Hill and their relatives held Sikh religious services within the confines of their barracks but this became a difficult situation with the increasing Sikh population, thus the need for a dedicated-structure for Sikh religious activities grew. The civilian Sikh population at the time wanted their own gurdwara that was separate from the police-gurdwara, thus a civilian gurdwara was established at Queen Street. This gurdwara formed out of the purchase of a large compound (with a bungalow) in 1912 by a committee of Sikhs led by the Sindhi merchant Wassiamull Assomull Mahtani. The gurdwara shifted from Pearl Hills to a bungalow on Queen Street and was named the Wadda Gurdwara ("big gurdwara"). In 1986, the gurdwara moved from Queen Street to Towner Road due to government urban development plans, and is now known as the Central Sikh Temple. On the temple's site is hosted the Central Sikh Gurudwara Board, Singapore Sikh Education Foundation, and the Sikh Youth Centre.

Another gurdwara was founded at Arson Road but shifted to Silat Road in 1912. The Pearl's Hill and Tanjong Pagar police-gurdwaras were demolished and a new gurdwara, Gurdwara Sahib Silat Road replaced their purpose, with its construction being completed in 1924, at the cost of SGD 54,000. On 12 October 1966, the Bhai Maharaj Singh Memorial in the Singapore General Hospital area was shifted to the front of Gurdwara Sahib Silat Road, which helped increase the congregation numbers of the gurdwara at a time when it was struggling. In 1995, the Gurdwara Sahib Silat Road was renovated at the cost of SGD 8.3 million. The gurdwara claims to have the largest gurdwara dome outside of India and the largest pālkī (palanquin) in the world. The gurdwara complex contains the Bhai Maharaj Memorial and Sikh Heritage Centre.

As for the other gurdwaras, Gurdwara Sahib Sri Singh Sahib was associated with Majhai Sikhs, the Khalsa Dharmak Sabha was associated with Malwai Sikhs, and the Pardesi Khalsa Dharmak Diwan was associated with Doabi Sikhs. The gurdwaras of Jalan Kayu and Sembawang were merged to form the Gurdwara Sahib Yishun. There is also the Katong Gurdwara.

The Sikhs of northern Singapore were served by three gurdwaras: Naval Base Sikh Temple (est. 1925); Sembawang Sikh Temple (est. 1936), and Jalan Kayu Sikh Temple (est. 1930's). These gurdwaras were all amalgamated over the years until a single gurdwara was constructed in Yishun New Town in 1995 to serve the northern Sikhs of Singapore: Gurdwara Sahib Yishun. The Sikh Advisory Board of the Singaporean government enacted the Central Sikh Gurdwara Board Act in 1981 to oversee and manage the gurdwaras of Singapore. There are eight operational gurdwaras in Singapore presently.

=== List of operational gurdwaras ===
There are currently seven gurdwaras operating in Singapore, with the most revered being Gurdwara Sahib Silat Road as it contains the tombstone of Bhai Maharaj Singh. At-least two of the gurdwaras are under the management of the Central Sikh Gurdwara Board established by the Central Sikh Gurdwara Act, namely the Central Sikh Temple and Gurdwara Sahib Silat Road. A list of the operation gurdwaras of Singapore is as follows:

- Central Sikh Temple
- Gurdwara Sahib Silat Road
- Gurdwara Sahib Yishun
- Gurdwara Sri Guru Singh Sabha
- Gurdwara Silat Road Sikh Center
- Gurdwara Khalsa Dharmak Sabha
- Gurdwara Pardesi Khalsa
- Gurdwara Katong Sri Guru Nanak Satsang Sabha

=== List of former gurdwaras ===
- Pearl’s Hill Gurdwara
- Tanjong Pagar Dock Sikh Police Gurdwara (demolished in 1912)
- Naval Base Sikh Temple (1925–1971)
- Sembawang Sikh Temple (1936–1995)
- Jalan Kayu Sikh Temple (1930's–1995)

== Festivals ==
A local Singaporean Sikh festival is the Barsi of Bhai Maharaj Singh, celebrated annually at the Bhai Maharaj Singh Memorial. An akhand path is held during it.

== Influence of Sikhs on Singaporean culture ==
=== Bukit Brown ===
Bukit Brown ("Brown's Hill") is a Chinese cemetery in Singapore that features 25 pairs of guardian statues depicting Sikh men guarding the tombs. The height of the Sikh guardian statues in the cemetery ranges from 3 to 6 feet. They are placed to the front-right and front-left of the tombstone, with one exception of the Sikh guardian statue being placed behind the tombstone. They were arranged in this manner as per feng shui principles. The Sikh guardian statues were positioned just after the guardian statues of Chinese faeries. The Sikh guardian statues of the Chinese cemetery are a reflection of the Singaporean Sikh community's reputation in the early 20th century of being superb watchmen.

Sikh guardian statues of Bukit Brown Cemetery

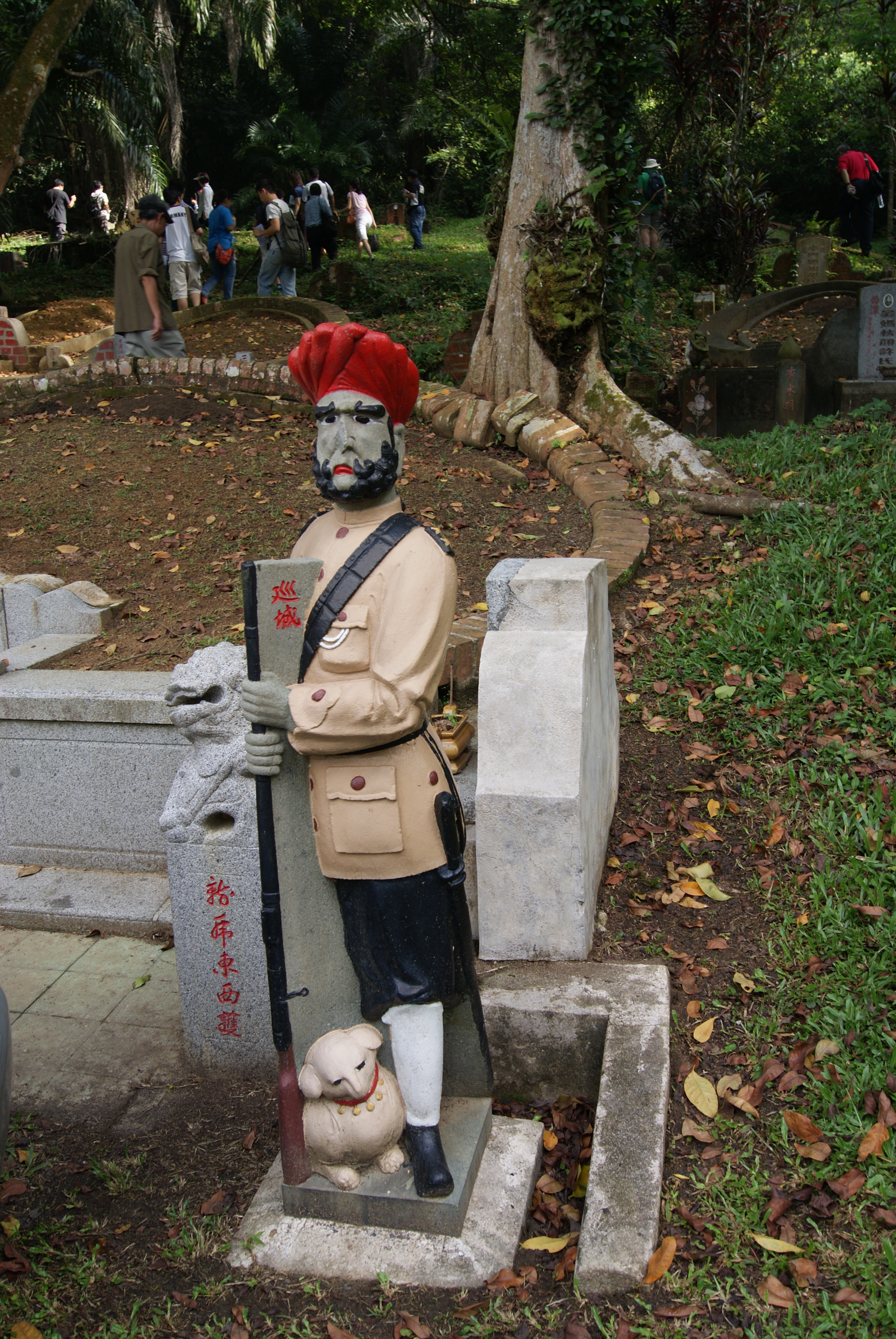

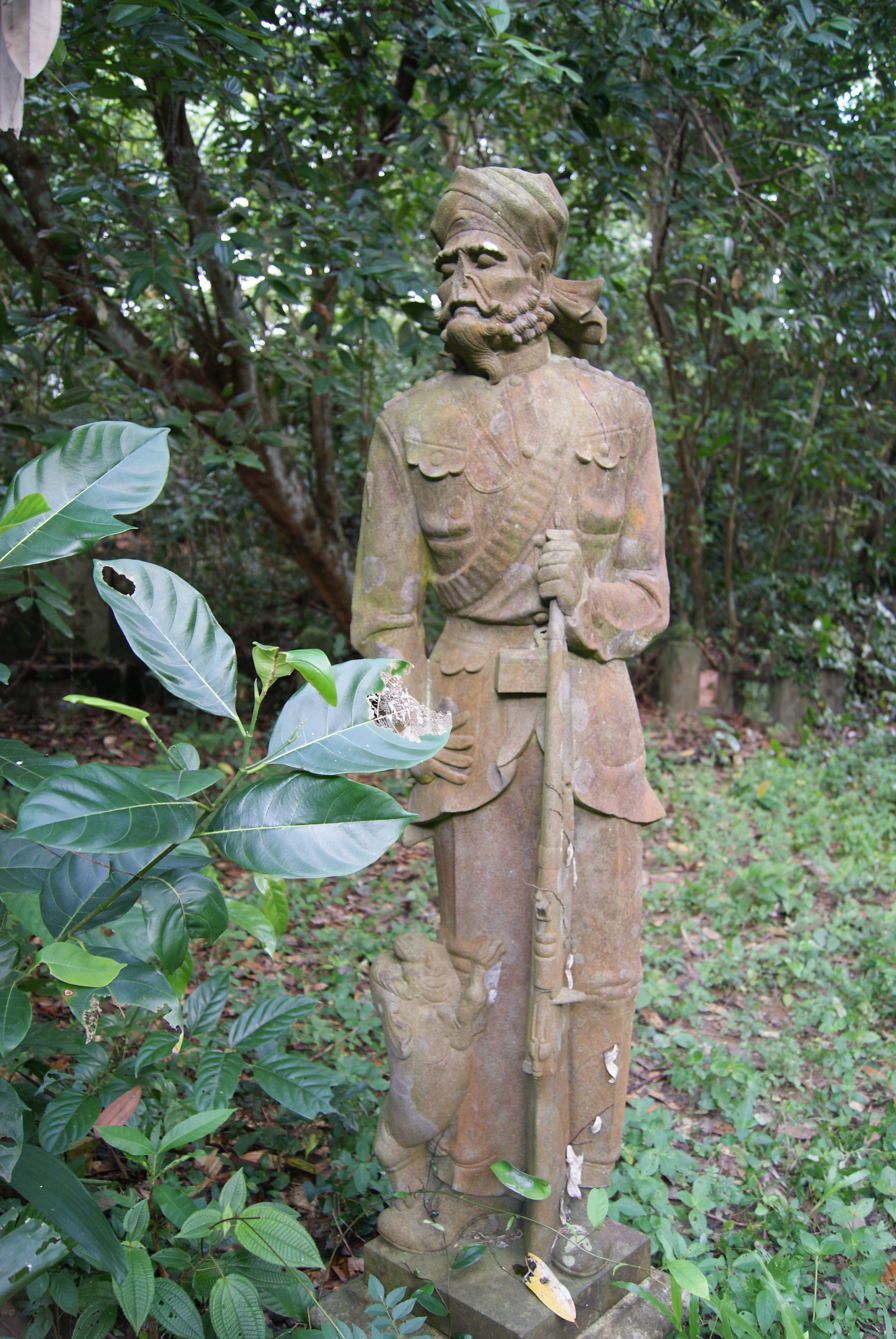

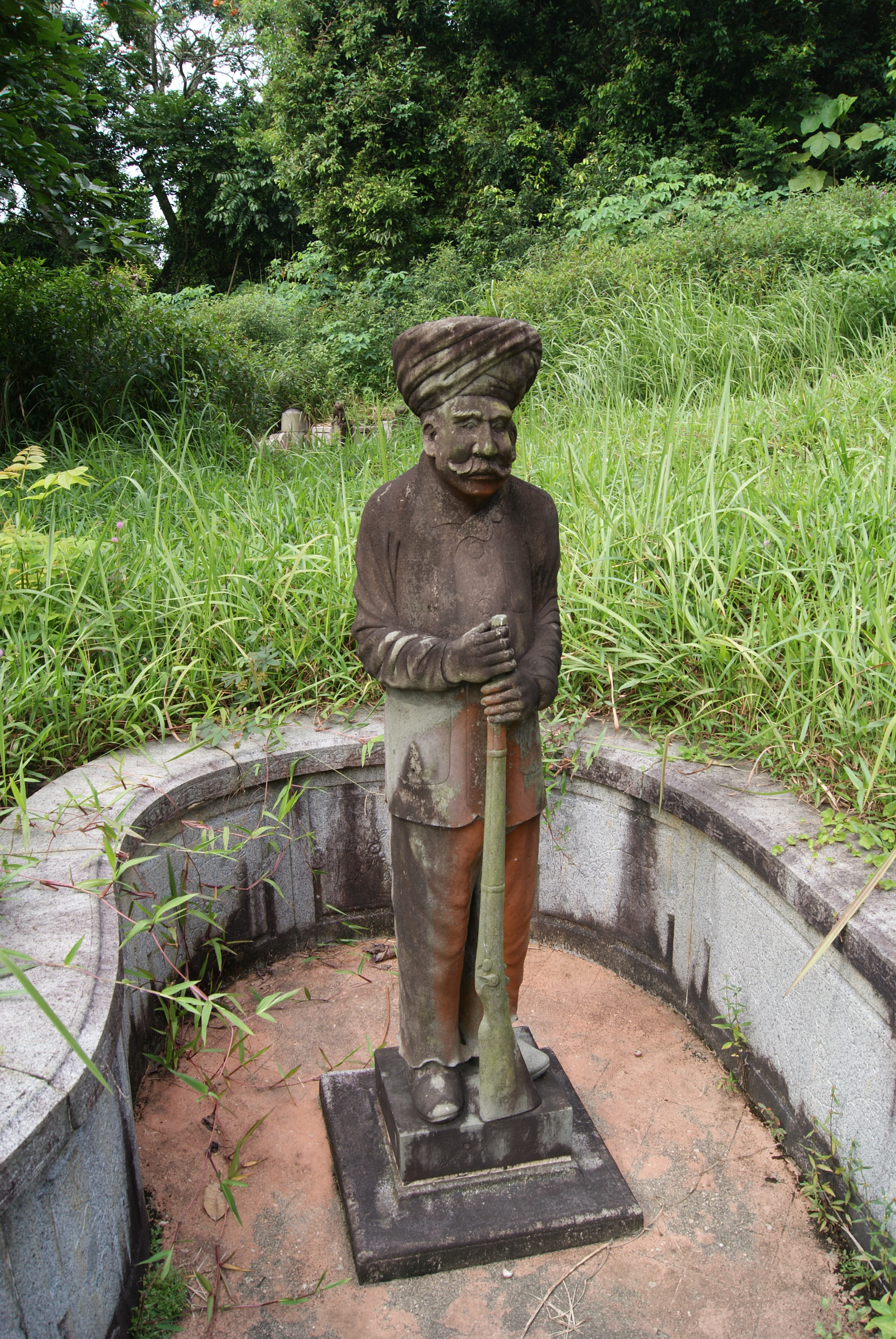

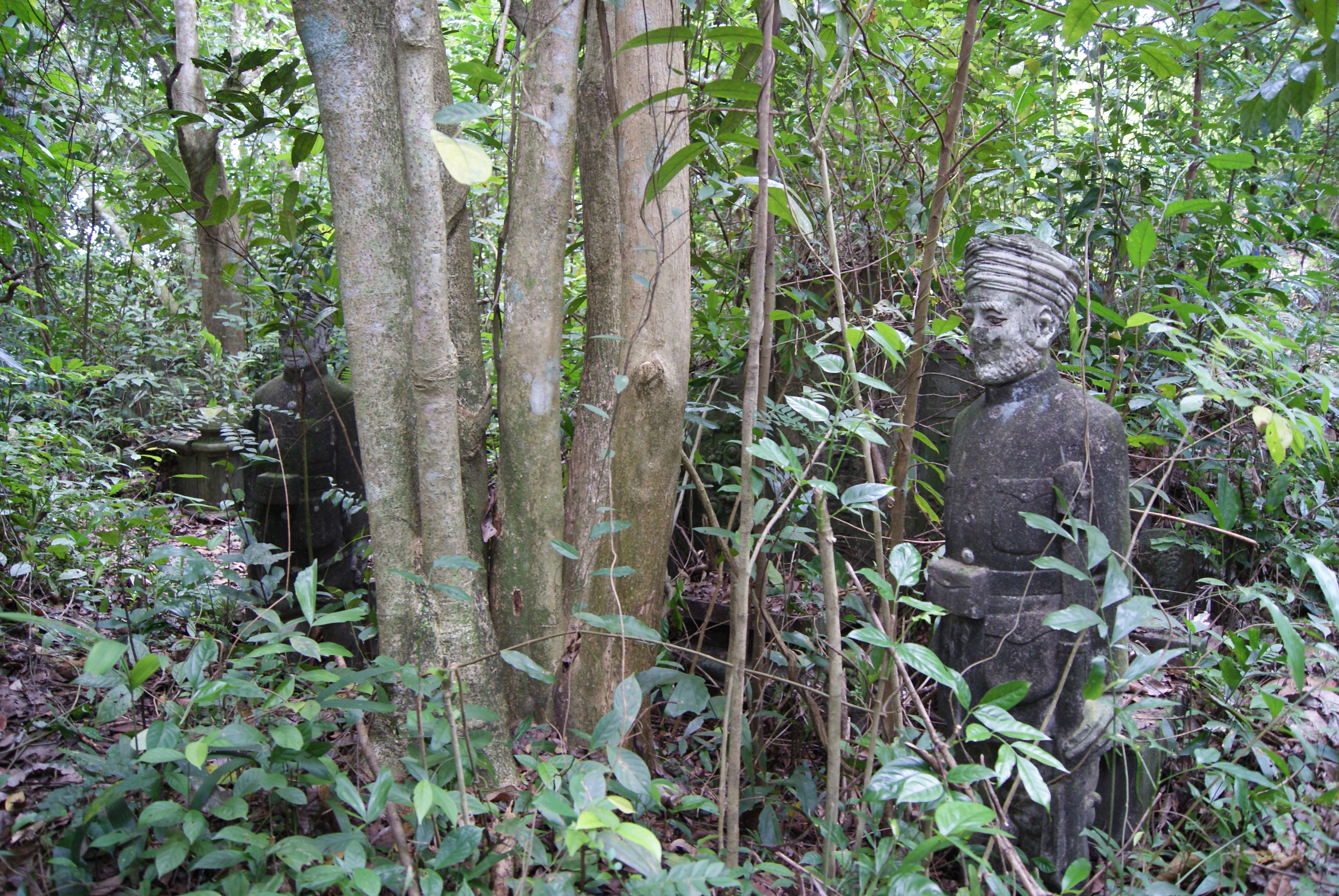

== Prominent Sikhs ==
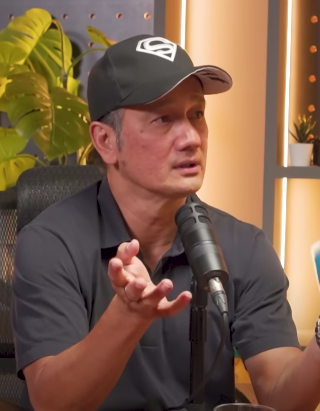
Gurmit Singh

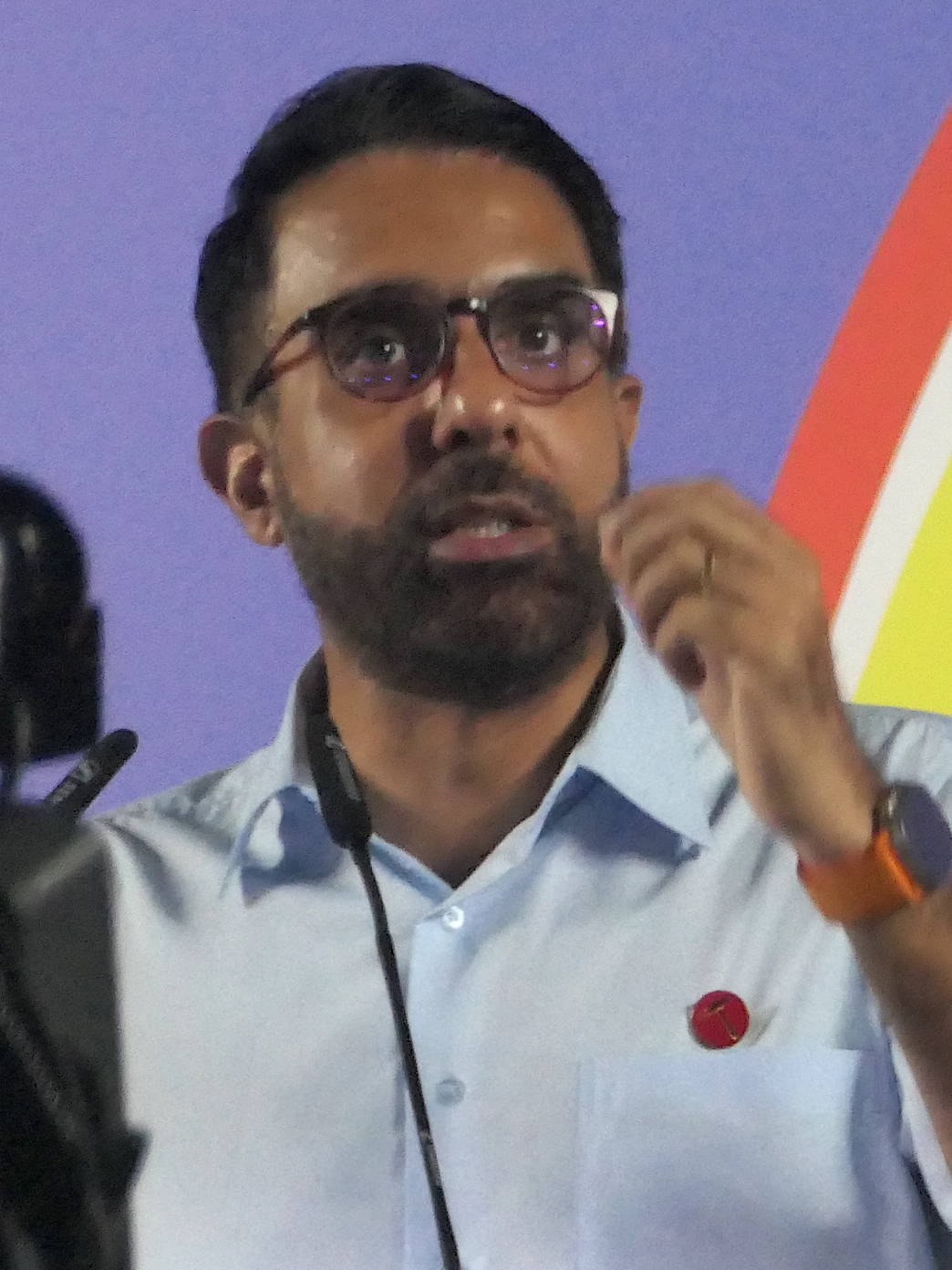
Pritam Singh

The Sikh Foundation and The Punjabi Foundation of Singapore are prominent associations that are promoting Sikh heritage and Punjabi language there. Some prominent Sikhs who earned name in public life are:

- Choor Singh, first Sikh Judge of Supreme Court
- Kanwaljit Soin, first female Nominated Member of Parliament (NMP), orthopaedic surgeon and co-founder of the Association of Women for Action and Research (AWARE)
- Jaswant Singh Gill, first commander of Singapore Navy
- Kartar Singh Thakral, founder of Thakral Corporation Ltd
- Gurmit Singh, actor and comedian who acted in Phua Chu Kang Pte Ltd series. Converted to Christianity in 1985.
- Major-General Ravinder Singh, former chief of the Singapore Army
- Inderjit Singh, former People's Action Party (PAP) Member of Parliament (MP) for Ang Mo Kio Group Representation Constituency (GRC)
- Davinder Singh, former PAP MP for Bishan–Toa Payoh GRC
- Pritam Singh, Workers' Party (WP) MP for Aljunied GRC and Leader of the Opposition from 2020 to 2026
- Ajit Singh Gill, hockey player, sportsperson and Olympian

== Demographics ==
Population figures and estimates for the number of Singaporean Sikhs vary, ranging from 7,000 – 13,000. In the 1931 Singapore census, there was a total of 2,988 Sikhs recorded, with 2,666 living in the municipal area and 322 living outside the town areas. According to the 2000 Singapore census, 5% of Indian-Singaporeans were Sikhs.

Population of Singaporean Sikhs
Year	Figure	Citation(s)
1881	165	
1921	195	
1931	2,988	
2010	12,952	
2020	12,051	

=== Ethnic breakdown ===
Below are the ethnic breakdown of Sikhs according to the 2020 Singapore Census of Population as follows:

Ethnic Group	Total Resident Population of Ethnic Group	Population of Resident Ethnic Group registered as Sikhs	Percentage of Resident Ethnic Group registered as Sikhs	Percentage of Sikh Residents by Ethnic Group
Chinese	2,606,881	11	0.0004%	0.09%
Malays	447,747	80	0.02%	0.66%
Indians	299,056	10,265	3.43%	85.18%
Others	105,410	1,695	1.61%	14.07%
Overall	3,459,093	12,051	0.35%	100%

== See also ==
- Jainism in Southeast Asia
- Hinduism in Southeast Asia
