= Thukral =

Thukral is an Indian surname from the Arora (Khatri) community of Punjab. Variant spellings of the name include Thakral and Thukraal.

== Notable people ==
Notable people with this surname include:

- Karan Singh Thakral (born 1955), Singaporean businessman
- Latika Thukral (born 1967), Indian banker and environmental activist
- Nikita Thukral (born 1981), Indian film actress and model
- Rajkumar Thukral, Indian politician and member of the Bharatiya Janata Party
- Sandeep Thakral (born 1973), Indian bridge player
- Santi Thakral (1942–2011), Indo-Thai judge and royal advisor
- Sarla Thukral (1914–2008), Indian female aviation pioneer

== See also ==
- Thukral & Tagra, Indian artist duo
- Thakral Corporation, Singaporean conglomerate
