= Central Sikh Temple =

Gurdwara in Singapore

Coordinates: 1.3166°N 103.8587°E

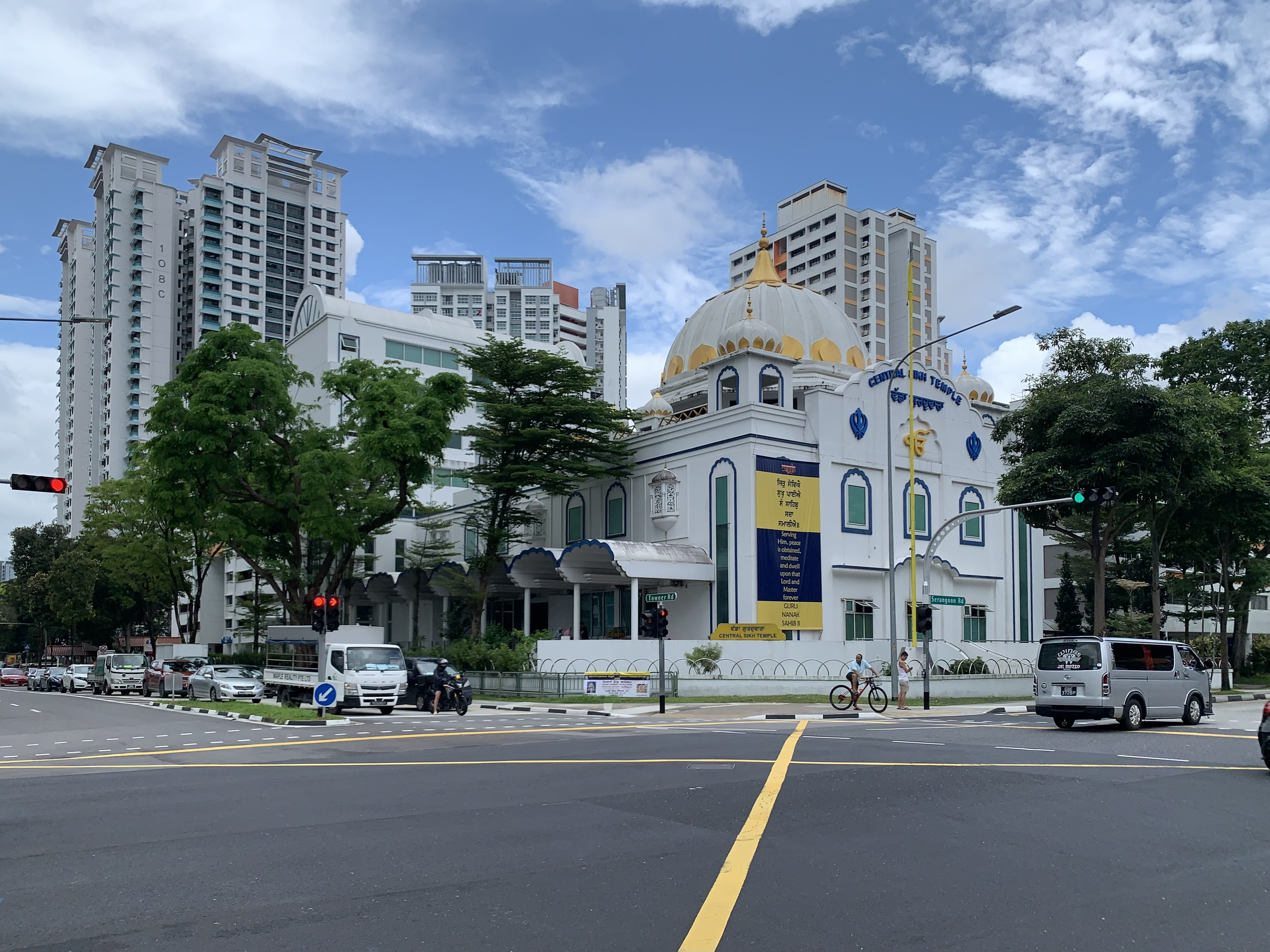

Religion
- Affiliation: Sikhism

Location
- Location: 2 Towner Road, Singapore 327804
- Interactive map of Central Sikh Temple

Architecture
- Completed: 1912; 114 years ago
- Construction cost: S$6.5 million

Central Sikh Temple or Central Sikh Gurdwara is a Sikh gurdwara in Singapore. Established in 1912, the temple had relocated several times before moving to its current site at Towner Road at the junction of Serangoon Road in Kallang in 1986 near Boon Keng MRT station. It is one of the seven Sikh temples located in Singapore. Beside the temple is a seven-story structure of the Sikh community that hosts cultural activities and religious classes.

== History ==
The Singaporean Sikh community was using the Police Gurdwara Sahib at Pearl’s Hill until the community decided to construct a new temple in 1912 with support from Sindhis and the Straits Settlements Police, Singapore Branch. As the number of Sikh immigrants in Singapore increased, a group of Sikhs purchased a bungalow at Queen Street, Singapore with the help of Wassiamull, a Sindhi merchant, to have a place of worship. The bungalow eventually became a gurdwara and established as the Queen Street Gurdwara Sahib, or Wadda Gurdwara, which meant "The Big Temple".

Due to regionalist, factional in-fighting within the Sikhs between Majhais, Malwais, and Doabis, control over the temple was confiscated from the Sikhs by government on 12 June 1917 and handed-over to Muslim and Hindu Endowment Board, leading to a decline of the gurdwara's services. Sikhs, led by Sham Singh Rumi, protested for the return of the gurdwara's control to their community in the 1930s. Eventually, the government passed the Queen Street Gurdwara Ordinance on 24 October 1940, which created a Sikh board of trustees to manage the complex, with the new board being appointed on 1 November 1940, known as the Queen Street Gurdwara Sahib Board of Trustees, being more representational of various regions of origin rather than favouring any particular one.

In 1955, the gurdwara began plans for expansion, with it purchasing nearby properties on Queen Street. Architectural plans were prepared in 1963 for the planned work. However, in 1977 the government acquired the Queen Street Gurdwara Sahib was situated as part of its urban redevelopment programme and shifted the site of a Sikh place of worship at Towner Road (at the junction adjoining Serangoon Road). The Guru Granth Sahib was kept at Bukit Ho Swee Community Centre at Seng Poh Road in 1979. The foundation-stone for the new shrine was placed by Sikh priest Sant Baba Nahar Singh Ji Sunehranwale of Punjab on 1 April 1983. Construction started in 1984 and ended two years later on 1986 during the occasion of Guru Nanak Gurpurab, costing S$6.5 million. In April 1986, the Guru Granth Sahib became housed at the new temple. The temple was officially opened by President Wee Kim Wee on 16 November 1986. It was designated as a historical site by the National Heritage Board on 8 May 1999.

== See also ==
- Religion in Singapore
