= Murder of S. Salim Ahmad =

1999 murder of a rag-and-bone man in Singapore

S. Salim Ahmad
- S. Salim Ahmad, the 56-year-old murder victim
- Born: S. Salim bin Ahmad; 1943; Japanese Occupation of Singapore
- Died: 2 May 1999 (aged 56); Geylang, Singapore
- Cause of death: Fatal skull fractures
- Occupation: Rag-and-bone man
- Known for: Murder victim

On 2 May 1999, at a coffeeshop in Singapore's Geylang, 56-year-old rag-and-bone man S. Salim Ahmad was brutally battered to death by a man whose girlfriend was allegedly harassed by Salim. The murderer, identified as Seah Kok Meng (Chinese: 佘国明; pinyin: Shé Guómíng; Pe̍h-ūe-jī: Siâ Kok-mêng), fled Singapore for Malaysia, where he remained in hiding for a year before his arrest in May 2000. Seah, who claimed that he was acting under sudden and grave provocation and had no intent to fatally assault Salim, was found guilty of murdering Salim and sentenced to death in November 2000. Seah's appeal was dismissed and he was hanged on 30 November 2001.

== Murder ==
On 2 May 1999, an elderly man was battered to death outside a coffeeshop in Geylang, Singapore.

The victim was 56-year-old S. Salim Ahmad, a rag-and-bone man who was allegedly bashed up by about three people. According to witnesses, Salim was seen running towards the coffeeshop and he was pursued by about three men, and two of them were allegedly armed with wooden sticks. After pursuing Salim for a distance of around 500m, the attackers, described to be Chinese people aged in their 30s who sported fair complexions, had caught up with Salim nearby a public pay phone outside the coffeeshop, and they had beaten Salim up. After the assault itself, the three perpetrators fled the coffeeshop and two of the assailants ran towards Lorong 3 Geylang, while the third and final suspect headed towards Lorong 7 Geylang.

An autopsy was conducted by forensic pathologist Dr Paul Chui, and he found three severe skull fractures on Salim's head, and each of these injuries were sufficient in the ordinary course of nature to cause death. Aside from the skull fractures, Dr Chui found injuries over Salim's right shoulder, chest, right forearm, right thigh and right ankle. He concluded that these injuries were caused by blunt force trauma as inflicted by a stick with a square or rectangular cross-section, and a moderately severe amount of force was used by the killer(s) during the course of the assault. After the completion of the autopsy, Salim's body was not immediately recovered by his family for burial.

== Investigations ==
The death of S. Salim Ahmad was classified as murder. The police conducted their investigations to identify the assailant(s) and interview the witnesses, including the owner of the coffeeshop, with regards to the fatal assault of Salim. Although it was initially determined that three people were involved in the murder, the investigations ultimately concluded that a sole attacker was responsible for murdering Salim. Soon after, the police received an informant's tip-off about the suspected murderer. Based on information provided, the police identified the suspect as 31-year-old Seah Kok Meng (alias Ah Meng), a Singaporean and labourer. However, Seah was no longer in Singapore by the time the police established his identity, and efforts were made to trace his whereabouts and arrest.

In the same month when Salim was murdered, Singaporean crime show Crimewatch re-enacted the murder of Salim (as well as an unrelated sexual assault case) and it aired on television. The police also sent a public arrest notice on the television programme, appealing for information to seek the whereabouts of Seah, as well as revealing his personal particulars in an effort to arrest him.

On 12 May 2000, the Royal Malaysia Police arrested Seah in Malaysia and the Singapore Police Force were notified of his arrest. The next day, an extradition order was issued and Seah was handed over to the Singaporean authorities. Upon his arrival in Singapore, Seah was charged with murder in the Subordinate Courts of Singapore, about a year after he killed Salim.

== Trial of Seah Kok Meng ==
Seah Kok Meng, who was accused of murdering Salim, who allegedly molested Seah's girlfriend

On 14 November 2000, Seah Kok Meng was officially brought to trial for the murder of S. Salim Ahmad at the High Court. Seah was represented by Surian Sidambaram and M. Mahendran, while the prosecution consisted of both David Khoo and Raymond Fong. The trial was presided over by Justice Kan Ting Chiu.

The trial court was told that on the night of 1 May 1999, at a hawker centre at Lorong 2 Geylang, Seah, his girlfriend Bok Swee Hoon (alias Ah Hoon) and a friend named Chan Kam Seong (alias Ah Xiang) were having drinks, and during the session itself, Seah and Bok had an argument with each other before Seah and Chan left the hawker centre, leaving Bok alone at the hawker centre. Bok, who was then in prison for drug-related offences, was summoned as a witness, and she testified that on the night before the incident, after she argued with her boyfriend and was left alone, she decided to head to a coffeeshop at the junction of Sims Avenue and Lorong 5, where Seah was a regular patron. On the way, Bok encountered the victim Salim, who followed her and even molested her on her breasts and shoulder. Although Bok warned Salim not to do so, Salim persisted and followed her to the coffeeshop. Bok did not find her boyfriend at the area, but Salim continued to harass her. Bok sat down at a vacant table inside the shop and tried calling her boyfriend, and Salim asked her repeatedly to go home with him.

Unable to take the harassment, Bok decided to seek help. She first used the telephone at the coffeeshop to call the flat she shared with Seah, but no one answered the call. Subsequently, Bok used her mobile phone to call Seah, who took the call. Bok then told her boyfriend that she had been harassed and molested by Salim, and she told him of her location. About ten to 15 minutes after the phone call, Seah arrived at the shop, and he probed her on where and who was the man that harassed her, and Bok pointed at Salim. According to Bok, she saw Seah wielding an object resembling a pole and smacked it at Salim twice, causing Salim to collapse. Even after Salim was downed by Seah at that point, Bok testified she saw Seah inflicting another two blows at Salim before he stopped. Afterwards, Seah grabbed Bok, and they left the coffeeshop together. Based on the other evidence adduced by the prosecution, Seah left for Malaysia a day after the killing, and he remained on the run for one year before he was caught in May 2000.

Chan, who was at the coffeeshop at the time of the murder, also came to testify as a witness. Chan told the court that he and Seah went wandering from Lorong 2 to Lorong 12 after the quarrel between Bok and Seah, and both men received the phone call from a distressed Bok, who informed them she was molested and stalked by a Malay man (referring to Salim). Chan followed Seah into a taxi to the coffeeshop and he heard Seah expressing that he wanted to wallop the molester up. Chan also saw Seah going into a back lane after they alighted the taxi nearby the shop, and he saw Seah returning with a wooden pole about 2 feet long with a cross-section of two inches square. Chan also said he saw Seah asked Bok where the molester was, and when Bok pointed at Salim, he saw Seah violently bring the pole down onto Salim twice. Even after Salim had fallen to the ground, Seah persisted in the assault by bludgeoning at Salim two more times before he left the scene. Chan revealed that throughout the onslaught, Salim never once spoke or retaliated. It was also revealed in court that Chan was arrested in November 1999 at the Woodlands Checkpoint for his connection to the crime but ultimately, he was let off after no further action was taken against him.

Seah elected to enter his defence at the close of the prosecution's case. On the stand, Seah testified that he never intended to cause death due to alcohol intoxication, and he only acted in both self-defense and a sudden and grave provocation. Seah testified that he was angered when he received Bok's phone call about her being harassed by Salim, and after reaching the coffeeshop, he met up with his girlfriend and he confronted Salim, who angrily spewed some Malay words at Seah, who did not understand what he said. Seah said afterwards, everything fell silent and both he and Salim stared at each other. Feeling frightened, Seah thus headed to the back lane behind the coffeeshop and he picked up a wooden plank, and he wanted to use it for self-defense in case he and Salim might have a fight.

After arriving back at the coffeeshop, Seah saw that Salim remained standing in front of Bok, and he gave a harder stare at Seah, and it appeared to Seah that Salim wanted to beat him. And upon seeing Salim about to raise his hand, Seah made his first move by striking Salim on the arms twice before he proceeded to hit at Salim (who by then fell down) on the head and body several times. Seah said that he stopped after Salim ceased any retaliation. With Bok pleading with him to stop, Seah decided to take his leave with Bok on a taxi to her flat at Ang Mo Kio and he eventually fled to Malaysia. Overall, Seah said that he was not in his right mind or full control of his faculties as a result of the alcoholic beer he drank when he murdered Salim, and that the provocative anger he felt at Salim's actions drove him into killing Salim under a loss of self-control. He also said he never intended to cause death but just to teach Salim a lesson.

However, there was one significant discrepancy between the court testimony and police statements of Seah. In his statements, which were recorded by Inspector David Ang with the help of a Hokkien interpreter, Seah said that when he approached Salim, Salim never showed any signs of wanting to attack Seah, and without warning, Seah raised the wooden pole and violently hit Salim several times, before and after Salim collapsed, which contradicted his account in court. Seah replied during the prosecution's questioning that Salim's attempt to fight might have not been recorded by the police investigators, although this was not put to Inspector Ang or the interpreter. Also, Seah denied telling Chan that he wanted to wallop Salim or grabbed the pole before entering the shop to confront Salim. When Seah was asked by the prosecution why he did not simply chose to leave when Salim stared at him and frightened him, Seah only replied that he did not do so since Bok was not going to leave and was on her phone, and Salim himself also did not leave.

On 24 November 2000, Justice Kan Ting Chiu delivered his verdict. In his judgement, Justice Kan found that Seah was not suffering from an impaired mind as induced by alcohol intoxication, which was supported by Seah's full awareness of his surroundings and actions at the material time. Justice Kan also stated that Seah did not commit murder while under sudden and grave provocation, since by the time of his arrival, the molestation had stopped and while Seah may be reasonably enraged, he would have had simmered down at that point and Seah did not prove that the anger he felt at Salim's actions had made him sufficiently lose his self-control and drive him to kill Salim. Furthermore, Seah had attacked Salim without warning and Salim did not start the fight or even fight back in return, and Seah's court testimony of Salim about to fight him were inconsistent with the statements he gave to the police, and hence he rejected Seah's court defence and ruled that his statements were the true version of events and not recorded incorrectly as Seah claimed. Having determined that Seah intentionally inflicted head injuries onto Salim, such that the injuries were sufficient in the ordinary course of nature to cause death, Justice Kan concluded that there were sufficient grounds to return with a guilty verdict of murder.

Therefore, 32-year-old Seah Kok Meng was found guilty of murder and sentenced to death by hanging. At the time of Seah's sentencing, the Singaporean law allowed the mandatory death penalty for murder upon an offender's conviction.

== Appeal ==
On 23 April 2001, the Court of Appeal heard the appeal of Seah Kok Meng, before they dismissed it and upheld both Seah's murder conviction and death sentence. In a judgement dated 21 May 2001, the three appellate judges - Chief Justice Yong Pung How, Justice L P Thean (Thean Lip Ping) and Justice Chao Hick Tin - stated that they agreed with the original trial judge Kan Ting Chiu that Seah indeed retained his self-control at the time of the murder and while he may not have intended to cause death during the battering of the victim S. Salim Ahmad, he had the clear intention to cause the skull fractures that ultimately led to the death of Salim. The three judges also noted that aside from staring back at Seah, Salim did not arm himself with any weapon and did not make a move when Seah struck him on the head and killed him, which contradicted Seah's court testimony that Salim was about to make a move, which prompted Seah to wield the plank and hit him. Hence, the appellate court rejected Seah's appeal.

== Execution ==
Seah Kok Meng was hanged in Changi Prison on the Friday morning of 30 November 2001. On the same day when Seah was executed, one male drug trafficker was put to death at the same prison.

== See also ==
- Capital punishment in Singapore
