= Underground Ammunition Facility =

Military installation in Singapore

Coordinates: 1.4047°N 103.7603°E

The Underground Ammunition Facility is an ammunition depot in Singapore. It is the world's first large-scale underground containerised facility to be designed and developed within a densely developed urban area. This underground facility for storing ammunition requires 90% less land to be sterilised when compared with a traditional above-ground ammunition depot of similar capabilities.
