= Murder of Koh Mew Chin =

1999 murder of a Malaysian teenager in Singapore

Koh Mew Chin
- Koh Mew Chin, who was 18 when she was killed
- Born: Koh Mew Chin c. 1981; Perak, Malaysia
- Died: 25 March 1999 (aged 18); Pasir Ris, Singapore
- Cause of death: Strangulation
- Occupation: Factory worker (former)
- Known for: Murder victim

On 25 March 1999, an 18-year-old Malaysian woman named Koh Mew Chin (Chinese: 许妙珍; pinyin: Xǔ Miàozhēn; Pe̍h-ōe-jī: Khó͘ Miāu-chin) was found murdered in her rented flat at Singapore's Pasir Ris, where she lived with her boyfriend and several other Malaysians working in Singapore. A day after the killing, Koh's 19-year-old boyfriend Chan Choon Wai (Chinese: 陈俊伟; pinyin: Chén Jùnweǐ; Jyutping: Can4 Zeon3 Wai5), also Malaysian, was arrested and charged with murder.

The trial court heard that prior to Koh's murder, she was estranged from Chan, and met another man who treated her better, and on the day of her death, Koh tried to persuade Chan that their relationship should end due to their personality differences in spite of Chan's intention to reconcile their relationship. This led to Chan strangling Koh to death before he attempted suicide by slitting his wrists. Chan, who claimed that he committed the crime out of sudden and grave provocation, was found guilty of murder and sentenced to death a year after killing Koh.

== Murder investigation ==
On 25 March 1999, at a rented flat in Pasir Ris, a Malaysian tenant named Quah Chin Aun noticed a small trail of blood outside the room of one of his fellow tenants, and informed the flat owner Tan Puay Chin (also spelt Tay Puay Chin) about it. Tan entered the room and discovered another male tenant lying side by side with his girlfriend (also a tenant of the flat). The woman, who was motionless with bruises around her neck at the time of the discovery, was later pronounced dead by ambulance officer Norbayah Md Yasin upon the arrival of the paramedics, while the man, who had slit wounds on both his wrists, was brought to the hospital and later arrested.

The woman was 18-year-old Koh Mew Chin, a Malaysian who came from Perak. The man found lying beside her was her 19-year-old boyfriend, Chan Choon Wai, who was also Malaysian but born in Ipoh and most recently from Kuala Lumpur. Both Koh and Chan worked in Singapore but were unemployed when Koh was found dead in her room, which she shared with Chan and two other female tenants - Lim Sew Foung and Goh Lee Lee - who were also Malaysians.

Professor Chao Tzee Cheng, the senior forensic pathologist, conducted an autopsy on Koh and found that Koh was strangled to death, and her death occurred roughly between eight and ten hours prior to his examination of the corpse. Based on the strangulation marks and bruises around Koh's neck, jaw and face, Professor Chao determined that the assailant(s) had used both a ligature and his own bare hands to strangle Koh, who died from suffocation and lack of oxygen to the brain due to the considerable amount of pressure applied to Koh's neck. Professor Chao would eventually come to court in January 2000 to testify regarding the victim's cause of death, before he died a month later at the age of 67, making this likely his last major case.

Chan, who was the last person seen with Koh, was arrested the next day for allegedly killing Koh. Chan was charged with murder.

== Trial of Chan Choon Wai ==
Chan Choon Wai, the boyfriend of Koh Mew Chin and suspect of her murder

On 17 January 2000, 20-year-old Chan Choon Wai stood trial at the High Court for the murder of 18-year-old Koh Mew Chin. Karen Loh Pei Hsien and Amarjit Singh were both in charge of prosecuting Chan for murder, while Tan Teow Yeow represented Chan as his defence counsel in court. Judicial Commissioner (JC) Amarjeet Singh presided over the trial hearing of Chan's case.

The court was told that prior to the murder (as pieced together by the female tenants Lim Sew Foung and Goh Lee Lee, and a third friend named Wendy Lim Geok Mui), just fifteen days before she was killed, Koh became interested in a Malaysian man named Sam Hooi Sau Ching, who was first introduced to Koh by Wendy Lim. Koh, who first met Chan in September or October 1998 before they began dating, noticed that Hooi was a better person than Chan, as Hooi treated her better than Chan (who often exhibited a violent temper); Hooi even gave her S$250 to spend despite having only met each other. Koh went to Genting Highlands with Hooi at one point, and her interactions with Hooi made her feel more attracted to Hooi. The three witnesses also testified that Chan was not happy with Koh spending time with Hooi and tried to bring her back to no avail, and he was also fearful that Koh would leave him for Hooi. Hooi, who was unaware of Koh's relationship with Chan up until the trial, confirmed the witnesses' version of how he came to know Koh, whom he grew to like as well. The prosecution contended that Chan had murdered Koh before he was found with his wrists slit.

Chan, who elected to give his defense, initially told police that on the afternoon of 25 March 1999, he and Koh met up and had sex in their rented room together. After this, Koh, for unknown reasons, was depressed and she told Chan that they should suicide together. Koh consented to Chan strangling her and Chan planned to slit his wrists. However, in his later statements, Chan retracted the original story and said that on that afternoon, after the couple had one round of sexual intercourse, Koh once again told Chan (like she previously had) that she wished to end their relationship because she felt that they were unsuitable for each other and she had developed feelings for Hooi, who treated her better than Chan and had better job prospects than Chan. Chan, who at first intended to make use of their meeting (which occurred after he threaten to kill himself if Koh did not show up) to convince Koh from breaking up with him, was incensed at her remark and he used his bare hands to strangle Koh to death (he denied using a ligature to do so). He then used a fruit knife to cut his wrists to attempt to join Koh in death out of guilt for killing her, but survived. Based on the revised version of events recounted by Chan, the defence counsel attempted to raise the defence of grave and sudden provocation to rebut Chan's murder charge, arguing that due to the hurtful comment made by Koh, Chan was provoked into anger and loss of self-control. He thus committed the killing and should not be convicted of murder, but of manslaughter. Chan added that he initially lied about the suicide act out of his struggle to accept the fact that his girlfriend was dead. He also denied strangling the victim to death despite the prosecution's arguments against him.

On 29 January 2000, the trial judge Amarjeet Singh delivered his verdict. In his judgement, JC Singh rejected Chan Choon Wai's defence of grave and sudden provocation. He found that in the previous occasions before her death, Koh Mew Chin made it clear that her relationship with Chan should end in view of the circumstances and contextually, Chan had plenty amount of time to ponder over the future of the couple's relationship. Koh's single remark of wanting to break up with Chan right before she died was merely a mild form of provocation and did not warrant Chan losing his self-control to the extent of strangling his girlfriend to death; his actions were merely an over-reaction mixed with jealousy towards Koh's verbal rejection. Also, based on the medical evidence of Professor Chao Tzee Cheng, the bruises around Koh's neck showed that Chan had not only used both his bare hands to strangle Koh, but had also used a ligature to strangle Koh until she died. Chan's decision to slit his wrists was just a ploy to give a false impression to the police that there was a suicide pact between him and Koh, rather than him doing so out of guilt for killing his girlfriend. JC Singh further cited that at the time of the offence, Chan never suffered from diminished responsibility or unsoundness of the mind, as confirmed by the psychiatric evidence provided by the government psychiatrist Dr Stephen Phang.

20-year-old Chan Choon Wai was found guilty of the murder of 18-year-old Koh Mew Chin and sentenced to death. Under the Penal Code of Singapore, the death penalty was mandatory for offenders guilty of murder and the sentence was carried out by hanging if it was not commuted by either the higher courts or the President of Singapore. After his sentencing, Chan reportedly smiled at his relatives as he was led away from the courtroom.

== Appeal ==
On 22 May 2000, Chan Choon Wai's appeal was heard at the Court of Appeal by three judges - two Judges of Appeal Chao Hick Tin and L P Thean, and Chief Justice Yong Pung How.

Chan's lawyer Edmond Pereira tried to raise the same defence of sudden and grave provocation and the same arguments as the ones made in the trial to prove that at the time of the killing, Chan lost his self-control and had killed Koh while under an impaired state of mind, and sought to overturn his murder conviction. However, the appeal was dismissed after the three judges agreed with the trial judge's findings that Chan had deliberately and intentionally strangled Koh to death, and it was an over-reaction to Koh's single comment of her preferring to date Sam Hooi rather than Chan.

== Chan's fate ==
After his death sentence was upheld through appeal, Chan Choon Wai was hanged in Changi Prison sometime between late 2000 and early 2001 for murdering Koh Mew Chin.

On 23 February 2001, sometime after Chan was put to death, a prison counsellor, who counselled every inmate on death row for the past five years, was interviewed about his past experiences in this job. The counsellor revealed that he counselled Chan for more than a year prior to Chan facing the gallows. He revealed that during his interactions with Chan, he observed that Chan was gradually harbouring remorse for killing Koh, and Chan was noticeably resigned to his fate, knowing that he would inevitably be executed and similarly, Chan's family were also resigned to the likelihood of Chan undergoing execution for his offence despite their lament that he would die at an early age as a result of committing murder.

In February 2000, the case of Koh's murder was one of the ten most high-profile acts of violence against women in Singapore that happened during the past year.

== See also ==
- Capital punishment in Singapore
