= Wassiamull Assomull =

19th-century Sindhi businessman

Wassiamull Assomull, also known as Seth Wassiamull Assomull Mahtani, was a Sindhi workie who established overseas trading-firm businesses in Singapore, the Dutch East Indies (Indonesia), Hong Kong, China, and Australia. (Note: His name is also spelt as 'Wassiamull Asoomull' and 'Wassiamall Assomull'.) His international company was known as Messrs. Wassiamull Assomull & Co. The company had around fifty-two branches worldwide, with specialization in the trade of Chinese, Japanese, and Indian products (especially silk and curios). Other companies, such as those associated with D. Chellaram, M. Dialdas, J. T. Chainrai, Wassiamull Assomull, and Chotirmal, operated on a similar model based around a transnational Sindhi-origin family.

== Career ==
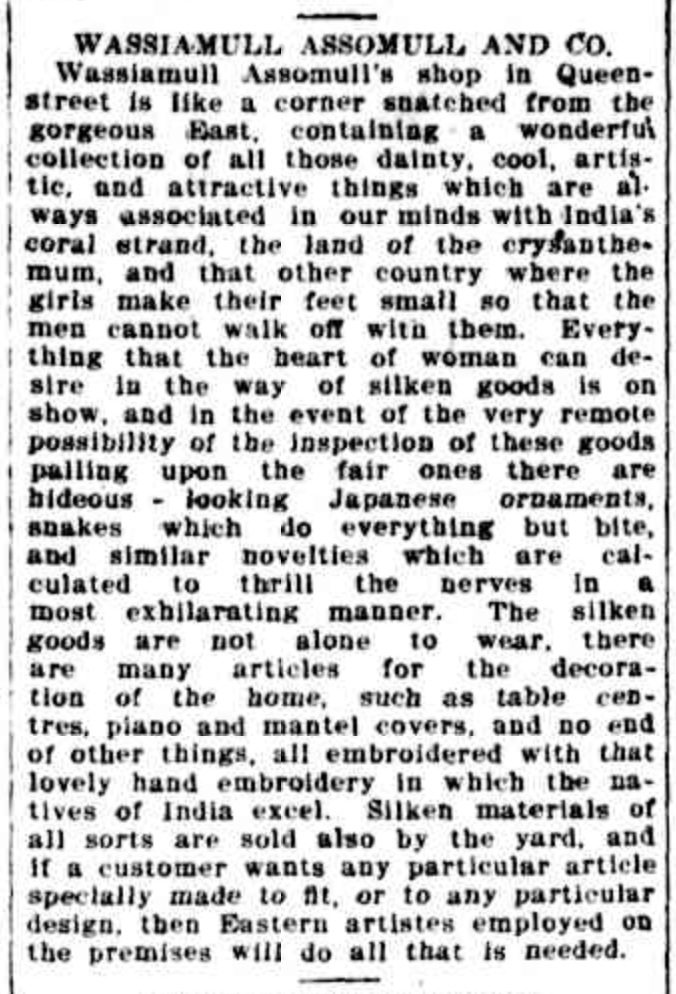
Wassiamull Assomull & Co. advertisement published within The Brisbane Courier (Wednesday, 17 December 1902)

Wassiamull's family originated from Hyderabad in Sindh but migrated overseas in 1840. In 1864, Wassiamull began a textile business in Singapore and is believed to have been the first Sindhi to visit Singapore. According to Dayal N. Harjani, Wassiamull founded his company in 1866. In 1868, the company established itself in Hong Kong and began selling and exporting Chinese products, such as raw-silk, silk piece-goods, and curios, but also Indian products. The Chinese products were exported worldwide, including in India. They avoided dealing with grains, yarns, opium, and cassia. In the 1890's, Wassiamull's company began trading in Hong Kong. By the 20th century, his company grew to have sixty-four branches around the world, with twenty of them being in China. In Australia, the company had branches in Sydney, Melbourne, Brisbane, and shortly in Adelaide. The company also helped establish educational institutions in Bombay.

== Establishing diasporic Sikh gurdwaras ==
A civilian gurdwara was established at Queen Street in Singapore in 1912 on property purchased by a committee of Sikhs led by Wassiamull. The Sindwork firm Wassiamall Assomull donated funds toward the construction of a gurdwara in Manila in the Philippines in 1933.

== See also ==
- R. D. National College
