= Murder of T. Maniam =

1999 killing of a retired police officer in Singapore

T. Maniam
- Born: Madavamani s/o Thuraisamy Thagavelu c. 1943; Singapore
- Died: 21 April 1999 (aged 56); Phoenix Garden, Singapore
- Cause of death: Murdered
- Occupations: Police officer (Singapore; 1963–1993); Security guard (Singapore; 1993–1999)
- Employer: Singapore Police Force (1963–1993)
- Known for: Murder victim
- Spouses: Laxhmi (m. 1966; div. 1991) Julaiha Begum (m. 1991)
- Children: Two sons (with Laxhmi) and two stepdaughters (from Julaiha's first marriage)

On the early morning of 21 April 1999, a 56-year-old former police officer named T. Maniam was ambushed by two men who used weapons to brutally beat him to death on the road between his house and his neighbour's home in Phoenix Garden, Singapore. His death was witnessed by his elder stepdaughter and one of his neighbours, together with the neighbour's maid. Following police investigations, three suspects, including Maniam's second wife Julaiha Begum, were arrested for the alleged murder, and the remaining two suspects, Loganatha Venkatesan and Chandran Rajagopal, were identified to be the men seen at the scene of the crime.

When the trial of the three killers started in December 1999, it was charged that Julaiha, who was having a soured relationship with her husband and got into legal disputes with him, and it was said that she plotted to kill her husband with the two other defendants and another two men (one still at large as of today and another had backed out of the plan before the murder) in order to get full ownership of the flat and the proceeds from the sale of the house. On 14 March 2000, the High Court found all three guilty of murder and sentenced them to death by hanging. The trio were hanged in Changi Prison on 16 February 2001 after the loss of their appeals against the death sentence.

== Murder ==
On the early morning of 21 April 1999, 55-year-old former police officer T. Maniam was about to go to work. When he reached his car, he noticed that a truck was driving towards his car. Suddenly, the truck hit the back of Maniam’s car, and two men stepped out of the mysterious vehicle and took Maniam by surprise.

Armed with blunt instruments, the two men went forward and attacked Maniam, who fell down and was brutally beaten until he died while he was lying on the road between his house and his neighbour's home in Phoenix Garden, Singapore. At the same time, from her bedroom window, Maniam’s elder stepdaughter Fairos, then aged 29, witnessed the horrifying scene of her father being beaten to death on the road outside her neighbour’s house, much to her shock. Fairos was not the only one who witnessed the gruesome crime. A maid named Aurea David and her employer, Geraldine Tan Poh Choo (陈惠珠; Chén Huìzhū; Tân Hūi-chu), also saw what happened to Maniam.

After the short but swift attack, the two men left in their truck. An ambulance arrived at around 7.25 am, and the paramedics pronounced Maniam dead at the scene. Dr Teo Eng Swee, the forensic pathologist from the Health Sciences Authority, conducted an autopsy and found that the cause of Maniam’s death was due to severe head injuries. The base of Maniam’s skull was cracked from ear to ear, and there were at least four blows inflicted to the left side of his head and one to the right, and another to the neck. A part of Maniam’s right middle finger was also being hacked off by the blows as he raised his right hand to defend himself. Defensive injuries were also concentrated on his arms and hands.

== Investigations ==
Inspector Gordon Toh, a police officer who was formerly mentored by Maniam, became in charge of the case when the police were contacted about the alleged murder. When Toh began his investigations into his mentor’s death, he heard from Fairos that she recognized one of the two assailants as 25-year-old Loganatha Venkatesan, the boyfriend of her mother and Maniam’s estranged second wife, 51-year-old Julaiha Begum.

Based on this information, the police tried to look for Venkatesan in Little India. An informant contacted the police and told them that Venkatesan was about to fly out of Singapore very soon, and he was right at the moment at his lawyer’s office to settle his affairs before he was due to board his flight. The police managed to arrive on time at the lawyer’s office to arrest Venkatesan as a suspect in relation to the murder of Maniam. Later, the police managed to arrest a former neighbour of Julaiha, and the neighbour told the police where to find Julaiha before he was released. Based on the address given, the police arrived at a Tah Ching flat occupied by an ethnic Malay family, who rented a room to both Julaiha and Venkatesan. Julaiha, who was at the flat when the police arrived, became the second person to be arrested as a suspect in her husband’s murder.

Forensic evidence also revealed that there was some blue paint found on the back of Maniam’s car and broken plastic pieces found on the ground near Maniam’s car. The truck seen at the scene of crime was eventually located, and both the broken plastic pieces and paint were matched to the truck. When he was questioned by the police, the owner of the truck, Sarveshvaran Ratnasamy, told the police that he was not driving it on the day of Maniam’s murder, and he said that he actually loaned the truck to his two friends, known to him as Chandran and Mani respectively, the former whom said he wanted to use it for carrying a fridge.

After Sarveshvaran told them that Chandran lived in a rented room in Changi Road, both police officers, Staff Sergeant Erulandy Guruthevan and Inspector Zainal Abidin Ismail, led a group to conduct a police raid to apprehend Chandran. At around 5.30 am, on 28 April 1999, the police found Chandran’s place of residence, and they arrested Chandran, who shared the room with his friend Narayanasamy Tamilvanan and three other Indian males. Tamilvanan and the three other tenants were later released, while Chandran remained in police custody, and a police search yielded the discovery of Maniam’s photograph and written vehicle numbers in Chandran’s wallet. Chandran, whose full name was Chandran Rajagopal, was Venkatesan’s 24-year-old childhood friend, and both of them came from the same village of Pudukuppam, India. Chandran, Venkatesan and Julaiha were all charged with murder.

Mani, who allegedly helped drive the truck on the day of Maniam’s death, was not caught, and the police placed his name on the wanted list.

== Background ==
=== Early life and career of Maniam ===
Madavamani s/o Thuraisamy Thagavelu, better known as T. Maniam, was an ethnic Indian born in Singapore in 1943 during the Japanese Occupation of Singapore, which ended in August 1945. He later grew up and joined the local police force at the age of 20 in 1963. During his early years in the police force, Maniam became married to a woman named Laxhmi in 1966, and the couple had two sons.

Aside from this, Maniam was known to have investigated and cracked several murder cases, and sent several murderers to the gallows. One case investigated by Maniam was the murder of Lim Lee Tin, a woman who often dressed up as a man and was killed in 1989 by both Chin Yau Kim and his friend Ng Kim Heng for repeatedly harassing Chin’s older sister Seow Noi, who plotted Lim’s murder after she had had enough of her harassment. The Chin siblings and Ng were convicted and hanged on 31 March 1995. Another case was a schizophrenic killer named Neo Man Lee, who murdered Judy Quek in a public bathroom on 4 September 1984. Neo, who happened to suffer from a relapse of his illness when he killed Quek, was sentenced to life imprisonment for culpable homicide in March 1989.

During his years of service in the force, Maniam had also mentored a few police officers, including former artist Gordon Toh, who was the same investigating officer that caught his mentor’s killers. Toh, who retired in November 2017, said to a newspaper in 2018 that he had a close relationship with his mentor and was at first shocked to hear that he was assigned to investigate Maniam's death.

=== Relationship with Julaiha Begum ===
==== Affair and second marriage ====
In 1981, Maniam first met Julaiha Begum, who reported to the police about alleged spousal abuse. Back then, Julaiha had recently divorced her first husband, Abdul Kareem s/o Mohamed Shariff, with whom she had two sons and two daughters, Fairos and Sairah. Julaiha took custody of her younger son and two daughters, while Abdul Kareem had custody of their elder son. Since then, Maniam began to see more of Julaiha, and their relationship slowly grew intimate. Fairos and Sairah, who were five and eleven years old respectively when they first met Maniam, remember him fondly as he brought them up well and took good care of the two of them, as well as Julaiha's second son.

Later, Maniam became estranged from his wife and continued his affair with Julaiha, with whom he had fallen in love. He moved in to live with Julaiha and eventually divorced his wife, Laxhmi. Despite his divorce, Maniam remained in contact with his sons and ex-wife, and his sons still considered him as a good father. Julaiha and Maniam then became married in 1991. Unknown to the newly-wedded couple, their happiness would not last long.

==== Deterioration of relationship ====
Two years later, sometime in 1993, Maniam, who reached his 50th birthday, officially retired from the police force after 30 years of service. After his retirement, he began to open his own security business. Unfortunately, at around this time, his relationship with Julaiha began to decline. In combination to her prior disappointment that their new family home at Jurong Kechil was bought solely under Maniam's name two years before, Julaiha was insecure as Maniam’s retirement had posed a threat to her lavish lifestyle, and she often posed unstable moods over the situation. Still, Maniam did not mind as he still loved Julaiha.

Later, Maniam purchased a house at Phoenix Garden, this time under both his and Julaiha’s names. Still, there were more conflicts that brought the couple’s relationship into further decline. Firstly, Julaiha began to be more possessive of Maniam, as she grew jealous of her daughters for growing more attached to her husband as they grew older, as well as the relationship between Maniam and his two sons from his first marriage. She was also insecure that Maniam would leave her one day. Whenever she was upset, she was said to have gone into the room to beat her daughters up and throw objects around. Besides, whenever the couple argued, Julaiha would be the aggressor and pick a one-sided physical fight. Julaiha also went as far as to accuse her daughters of having an affair with their stepfather, which hurt all three of them.

The relationship between Julaiha and her family would deteriorate even further in mid-1995. The family of four went to India for a short holiday trip, but due to some unknown problems with the Indian authorities, both Sairah and her mother were detained in India for half a year and did not return to Singapore as scheduled. At that time, Sairah was enrolled as a tertiary student in an Australian university, and Maniam, who returned to Singapore with Fairos as scheduled, had to apply on behalf of Sairah to defer her studies until she returned in the end of 1995. During their time in India, Julaiha had unjustifiably blamed Sairah for their detention in India.

==== Julaiha’s affair and legal disputes ====
Later, sometime in 1996, during these unsettled times, 48-year-old Julaiha first met 22-year-old Loganatha Venkatesan, who was asked to come to the Maniam household to cut down a mango tree in the family's house garden. Despite the 26-year difference, Venkatesan became attracted to Julaiha, who still looked youthful and elegant even in her forties. It was then that both began an illicit affair.

It was in one evening in October 1996 when the affair between Venkatesan and Julaiha was discovered by Maniam and his stepdaughters, and the lovers were discovered holding hands while walking on a street in Teck Whye. Upon discovering it, Maniam became physical and assaulted Venkatesan, who also fought him. Venkatesan later sued Maniam and the girls for assaulting him, and Julaiha testified against her husband and daughters. Maniam was later fined $500, while the girls were acquitted. Not satisfied with the outcome, Venkatesan also raked up civil lawsuits against Maniam over the Teck Whye incident and another alleged event where Maniam sent people to physically hurt Venkatesan, and these lawsuits were still pending as of the time Maniam was killed.

In the early hours of the following morning, Julaiha arrived at her matrimonial home with her two male acquaintances, wanting to collect her belongings and leave the house, but a furious Maniam refused to allow it, and the two sides engaged in a fierce quarrel. The neighbours were disturbed and thus called the police, who arrived and ordered the men to leave. Julaiha was also allowed to leave after she took her belongings, but not before she threatened Maniam and her daughters that she would kill Maniam. After leaving her house, Julaiha shared a rented room with Venkatesan in Tah Ching Road.

Later, Julaiha and Maniam engaged in a legal lawsuit over the sale of the house. It was started first by Julaiha demanding 50% of the proceeds from the sale of the house. Maniam, on the other hand, offered her 40% of the proceeds, but Julaiha did not accept it. John Abraham, a lawyer and friend of Maniam who managed the civil lawsuit, heard from Julaiha that she wanted to get hold of the full share and it would be possible if Maniam died. The lawsuit was brought to court in 1998, where it was ultimately ruled that Julaiha would only get 20% while Maniam got the remaining 80% of the proceeds. The house was also ordered to be sold by June 1999. Angered over the unfavourable outcome, Julaiha began to plot her husband’s murder.

== Trial ==
The trial of Loganatha Venkatesan, Chandran Rajagopal, and Julaiha Begum began on 6 December 1999, with Judicial Commissioner (JC) Choo Han Teck hearing the case in the High Court of Singapore.

=== Prosecution witnesses ===
==== Sairah and Fairos ====
The prosecution’s first two witnesses were Julaiha’s two birth daughters, Fairos and Sairah, who were also Maniam’s stepdaughters. Both of them gave their account of what happened, including the background of their mother’s relationship with Maniam and how it gradually broke down in the face of jealousy, greed and legal disputes. In the court, the judge observed that the girls, in contrast to the normal expectation of parental loyalty which daughters had, were courageous in testifying against their mother and were both firm and clear in their testimonies and cross-examination, and they also expressed their resentment towards their mother for causing Maniam's death.

In addition, Fairos also told the court about what she had witnessed outside the house when her stepfather was attacked and killed. She said that she was not able to clearly see the faces of Venkatesan and Chandran, but she could tell that one of them was taller than the other by a head, and from the slim build of the taller assailant, she could tell that the taller man was Venkatesan, especially from his distinct slouch. As for how she identified Chandran as the shorter killer, she said that when she went to the police identification parade, she recognised him as the one from his haircut, which resembled a mushroom, in her own words.

Fairos’s testimony was corroborated by both her neighbours, Aurea David and Geraldine Tan. However, Aurea and Tan gave different versions of what they saw at the scene of the crime. Aurea said she saw only one male Indian using an object to swing at Maniam’s head, and her employer, whom the maid alerted and also went over to see what happened, said that she saw two Indians using weapons, which she described as an axe and a pole, to attack Maniam, and described one of them to be a head taller than the other. Luke Lee and N K Rajarh, the two lawyers representing both Venkatesan and Chandran respectively, tried to discredit the three witnesses’ evidence as non-identical and thus unreliable, given that all three did not give an exact number of assailants.

==== Govindasamy Ravichandran ====
Julaiha, Venkatesan, Chandran and Mani were not the only four participants in the plot of Maniam’s murder. There was a fifth man, 28-year-old fisherman Govindasamy Ravichandran, a childhood friend of both Chandran and Venkatesan who also came from Pudukuppam, the same village where Chandran and Venkatesan grew up. The bulk of the prosecution’s case against Julaiha and the two men was largely based on Ravichandran’s testimony, which was made in the middle of the trial after Fairos and Sairah.

When he first took the stand, Ravichandran told the court that he first knew of the plan to murder Maniam when he was recruited on 14 April 1999, and heard about it from Julaiha as the conspirators sat in a HDB void deck in Geylang. At first, Ravichandran was reluctant to help commit murder as he was then just married with a daughter who was born one year earlier. But Julaiha reassured him that she would pay him, and they would go to India together once she sold the house and got the money. It was with some persuasion that Ravichandran barely agreed to help assault Maniam. Over why did he knew it was to murder Maniam, he said that Julaiha wanted him to “finish off” Maniam, which he took to mean killing Maniam. The fourth man and driver, Mani, was only recruited a day after Ravichandran.

On 16 April 1999, the first attempt began. After the men went to watch a film in Sultan Plaza the night before, they prepared weapons and drove to the neighbourhood where Maniam lived. At that time, Ravichandran recounted, Venkatesan left the group, saying that he was recognisable and might add unnecessary risk to their plan, hence, he left it up to both Chandran and Ravichandran to kill Maniam. Later, the three men saw Maniam stepping out of the house to go to work. Both Chandran and Ravichandran thus prepared themselves with weapons and began to head out towards Maniam. Unlike Chandran, who was more inclined to commit the murder, Ravichandran was more fearful and hesitant to do so, given he was worried about his family. When Chandran gave him the signal to move forward and launch their attack, Ravichandran fearfully backed out and escaped, leading to Chandran being forced to follow suit and thus the first attempt failed.

After this failed attempt, Ravichandran testified that he had second thoughts about carrying out the plan and he secretly told himself if Venkatesan ever asked him for help in the plot again, he would cheat them of their money and escape to India. Two days later, while on the way to visit a friend, Ravichandran ran into Venkatesan and Chandran, who took him and his brother Rajesh to visit Julaiha in the flat where she rented a room. Over there, Ravichandran was told to once again finish off Maniam in the next morning. Ravichandran was also paid $3,000 by Chandran, who told him that Julaiha would supplement another sum once their plot succeeded.

The next morning, in the early hours of 19 April 1999, Ravichandran followed Venkatesan, Mani and Chandran to Maniam’s neighbourhood again. After Venkatesan left, Ravichandran, who still did not want to execute the murder, wanted to delay it and asked the three to go drink beer. They went together to a coffee shop where they had some drinks before returning to Maniam’s neighbourhood, where they found Maniam’s car missing. The trio then realised that their second attempt also failed. After a heated row between Venkatesan and Ravichandran, the latter began to secretly make plans to back out of the plot and return to India.

Ravichandran first informed his Japanese employer by telephone about his plans to return to India. He also sought assistance from the Ministry of Manpower for an expedited payment of his wages from the employer. Ravichandran also told his two friends Shanmugam and VJ Velu that Venkatesan and Chandran wanted him to murder Maniam when he met them for drinks, and he said that Shanmugam told him not to get involved in the plan. Similarly, another friend of Ravichandran, Saravanan Vasudevan, also told him not to get involved. Ravichandran was called the next day to go to Chandran’s residence to make preparations for another attempt to murder Maniam, and when he was alone in Chandran’s room, Ravichandran stole $3,000 from Chandran’s wallet. When Venkatesan told him to get a change of clothes for the plotters, Ravichandran pretended to do so but instead of going back to his room, he secretly fled to Tekka where he had a meal before continuing on his journey to his Tuas workplace. He avoided using his usual route of transport to work as he spotted Chandran among those waiting for Ravichandran’s employer’s hired driver and used the MRT to go to Tuas, where the same Japanese supervisor bid him farewell and gifted him $150 and a watch. Soon after, Ravichandran went to Shenton Way and bought a Singapore Airlines ticket to go back to Madras by plane that same day.

Ravichandran said that after he returned to India, he was approached by Chandran’s mother who demanded him to return Chandran’s $6,000, and also the Singaporean police officers who came to India to question him. He said that some of the villagers, upon knowing that he was originally involved in the plot to murder Maniam, suspected that Ravichandran had murdered Maniam and ran off from Singapore with the money, and this led to him agreeing to return to Singapore to testify in the trial of Maniam’s three killers to dispel his villagers’ erroneous beliefs. The lengthy account of Ravichandran were partially corroborated by his brother and his friends who heard about the plot of Maniam’s murder from him, and even Chandran’s roommate Tamilvanan, who happened to be present during the conversation between Ravichandran and the plotters about killing Maniam before the former fled Singapore, also told the court about what he overheard from the men, which corroborated Ravichandran’s account.

=== Defence ===
==== Venkatesan's and Chandran's joint defence ====
After the prosecution finished presenting their case, all three defendants elected to go to the stand. Venkatesan and Chandran went to testify first.

Both men put up a common defence. They denied any conspiracy to commit Maniam's murder, and while they do admit that they were at the scene of the crime, both men said that it was their hired truck driver, Mani, who killed Maniam. They added they had no intent to assault or cause harm to Maniam. Venkatesan, who also denied having an affair with Julaiha, told the court that he was quite anxious to get some money for personal matters but the civil proceedings against Maniam regarding the prior assault incident had dragged on for too long, which made him wanting to ask Maniam to negotiate with him for a peaceful settlement, in which he hoped that a sum can be given to him, but expressed his fear that Maniam would go physically hostile on him at the sight of him. Venkatesan also said that he brought along Chandran, Ravichandran and Mani as he needed their help in negotiating the settlement, but Ravichandran backed out.

From both Venkatesan and Chandran's accounts, they said that on the fateful day of 21 April 1999, when they arrived at Maniam's house before he was about to leave for work, both Chandran and Mani alighted the truck to express their intention to ask Maniam if he could give money to help Venkatesan's ailing father as to settle their feud. However, from their versions of what happened, Maniam behaved in a rude manner and used vulgarities on the two men. He also added that if Chandran wanted him to pay, he wanted both Chandran and Mani to bring their respective mothers to sleep with him. Chandran said that Mani was enraged upon hearing it, and thus went berserk and armed himself with a weapon to attack Maniam, and subsequently beaten him to death in spite of Chandran's pleas to Mani to stop attacking.

==== Julaiha's defence ====
Julaiha was the last of the three defendants to take the stand. On the dock, Julaiha firmly denied that she had a motive to kill her husband. She also denied that she had met Ravichandran or his brother, and denied having an affair with Venkatesan, and also insisted that the family life was peaceful and it was due to the threats of her daughter to kill her in order to marry her stepfather that led to Julaiha having to leave the house and turned to Venkatesan for help, thus forging a close relationship with him. Julaiha’s lawyer, Selva Kumara Naidu, also sought to discredit Ravichandran’s credibility as a witness given that he lied on several occasions (eg. he lied to the Indian authorities that he got $3,000 from Chandran and used a fake name in his previous passport) and had also stole from Chandran, which affected the validity of his testimony against Julaiha and the other two accused.

=== Judgement ===
On 14 March 2000, after a trial lasting 35 days, JC Choo Han Teck of the High Court released his final verdict on the case.

In his 18-page written verdict, JC Choo found that the three accused persons were clearly guilty of murder based on the evidence adduced in court. He stated that he accepted Ravichandran as a truthful witness despite the situation being solely his own word against all three, because Ravichandran was speaking with “the assuredness that comes only from a person who has been where he said he has been, and done what he said he has done”, and he gave a very detailed and complete account, and he was able to recall even the most minor details, including the name and date of the film he watched with the male plotters before his recruitment (which was confirmed by the cinema manager). Aspects of his account were also supported by other minor witnesses, which gave rise to Ravichandran’s truthfulness.

For the common defence of Venkatesan and Chandran, JC Choo disbelieved the weak defence they made, given that they were being seen by witnesses when committing the crime. He said that he did not believe that it was solely the missing driver Mani who fatally attacked Maniam and their arrival was not conducive for any supposed negotiation for peace since it was an early morning and there was the ongoing situation and mood of unsettled scores between Maniam and Venkatesan, which clearly concluded that this negotiation was not going to be in accordance to Venkatesan’s terms, since Venkatesan said himself, he was fearful of invoking Maniam’s rage and wrath should he presented himself within Maniam’s sight.

This fear was more apparent to show why he backed out in the early attempts to murder Maniam, and since one of his hired killers, Ravichandran, abandoned the plan and fled Singapore, it forced Venkatesan to, notwithstanding his fear of Maniam, become directly involved out of necessity. Venkatesan would not have become the driver and drove the truck up so close to Maniam when it would have shown his face, and from the evidence of the broken plastic pieces on the ground, it was consistent with the fact that Mani deliberately drive the truck against Maniam’s car to prevent the latter from escaping. There was no clear explanation from Venkatesan as to why the collision happened if it was true that he came for the purpose of peace. Since the defence failed, JC Choo said it was also impossible for Mani, who played the most minor of all the roles in the murder plot, would suddenly take on a significant role and go berserk and attack Maniam on his own accord.

Furthermore, with regard to the number of people seen at the scene, JC Choo judged that the discrepancies in the account of Fairos and both her neighbours did not affect the prosecution’s case, as taking into account of the time when the murder happened, the three witnesses were watching what was to them a horrible scene, viewed from different angles, each recalling different aspects of a quick and traumatic event. The judge rejected the fact that Fairos’s identification of Chandran and Venkatesan was unreliable, as he said that even before the police identification parade, Fairos was able to tell the police Venkatesan’s identity, and both the men had admitted that they were at the scene of the crime. Besides, the photograph of Maniam and the list of his vehicle numbers were also found in Chandran’s possessions, which would be more probable to say that they were used for the purpose of identifying Maniam for the kill.

With regard to the mens rea of the charge of murder against both Venkatesan and Chandran, while there was no need to prove any motive to return with a guilty verdict of murder, JC Choo highlighted that firstly, there was sufficient evidence to prove that the men arrived at Phoenix Garden with an intention to kill Maniam. Secondly, Chandran and Venkatesan had inflicted the injuries on Maniam in furtherance of their common intention to kill, hence, it was not necessary to identify who inflicted the fatal blow or blows, and they also intended to cause death by inflicting the blows on Maniam’s head. Thirdly, referring to the pathologist Dr Teo Eng Swee’s autopsy report, it was highlighted that the wounds inflicted on Maniam would, in the ordinary course of nature, result in death. Hence, based on each of these three grounds, both Venkatesan and Chandran would be guilty of murder, and in JC Choo’s comment, they had committed Maniam’s murder three times over.

Turning to Julaiha’s role in the murder, the judge acknowledged that she was not a direct participant but she masterminded and abetted her male accomplices to murder her husband. He accepted that Ravichandran did not mishear Julaiha when she said “finish off” her husband, which Ravichandran took to mean murder Maniam, and it was not discredited despite the denial from Julaiha. JC Choo conceded that it is not the law that no one may be condemned to death solely on the testimony of a lone witness, given the risk of such a reliance and the fact that a wrongful miscarriage of justice involving an innocent person executed was not amendable or subject to any compensation. The clear, correct description of the flat where Julaiha rented her room and the landlady’s subscribed television channel, as given by Ravichandran and his brother, had consolidated the former’s credibility.

Besides, even though Julaiha herself had expressed that she hope for a chance to reconcile with her husband, the other evidence like her threats to kill Maniam and her declaration to the landlady and other people that the house belonged to her prior to her husband’s death, and the discrepancies in her statements and testimony had largely proven the opposite, and since she clearly had a motive to engineer her husband’s death, Julaiha should be guilty of murder.

As such, JC Choo convicted all three defendants of murder, and sentenced all three of them to death by hanging.

=== Appeals ===
After the conclusion of the trial in the High Court, Venkatesan, Chandran, and Julaiha appealed against their respective death sentences to the Court of Appeal. All of them argued against Ravichandran’s credibility as a witness and they raised the same arguments and defences as they did in the High Court. The appeals were all rejected in July 2000.

Later, Julaiha appealed for clemency from the President of Singapore, which was the last resort for death row inmates in Singapore to escape execution, as it would allow their sentences to be commuted to life imprisonment if successful. On 5 February 2001, it was confirmed by her new lawyer, R Palakrishnan, that President S R Nathan declined her appeal for clemency, thus finalizing her death sentence, and she was set to hang in a short period of time.

== Execution of convicts ==
On 16 February 2001, the three convicts - Venkatesan, Chandran and Julaiha - were hanged in Changi Prison at dawn.

By then, Julaiha had one final wish before she was hanged, which was to see her daughters for the final time. However, she never got to fulfill her last wish as her daughters declined to visit her one last time. When asked in a documentary about why she did not go see her mother, Fairos did not give an explicit answer but told the interviewer that her mother gave her and Sairah a father who loved them, and ultimately, she took him away from them. She stated that while she did not hate her mother, she despised what she had done.

== Aftermath ==
In the aftermath of the case, the case of Maniam's murder was re-enacted by Crimewatch in 2001. In the episode, the police posted a photo of the missing accomplice, Mani the driver pickup, and asked the public to contact the police hotline if they had any information of his whereabouts, and the information will be kept strictly confidential. It is currently viewable via Mediacorp's website meWATCH.

Another local crime show True Files also re-enacts the murder of the retired police officer and the trial of the killers. The producers of the show also interviewed both Maniam’s ex-wife Laxhmi and his elder stepdaughter Fairos, with their faces concealed to protect their identities. John Abraham, the lawyer in Maniam’s civil suit, was also approached to speak out about his feelings towards the case. The episode, which first aired on 23 September 2003, has also been available on meWATCH since 5 February 2016.

== See also ==
- Capital punishment in Singapore
- Columbine High School massacre, which took place one day before the murder.
- Rolex watch murder, which took place one year and one day before the murder.
