= Karan Singh Thakral =

Singaporean businessman (born 1955)

- Born: April 7, 1955 (age 70); Singapore
- Occupation: Businessman
- Title: Executive Director, Thakral Group
- Spouse: Devinder Kaur
- Children: 5

Karan Singh Thakral (born April 7, 1955) is the Executive Director of the Thakral Group of companies, a family business. The group is 117 years old with businesses in real estate, technology, consumer product distribution, manufacturing, and retail. The group is headquartered in Singapore and has offices running across 30 countries.

== Business career ==
Karan serves as Chairman and Director of several companies in Thakral Group. His primary focus is on India, Singapore and Indonesia.

He is Singapore's Non-Resident Ambassador to Denmark. Previously, he served as Singapore's Non-Resident Ambassador to Sri Lanka. He has held positions for both private and government sectors in Singapore. He has served on the board of various Singapore Government related organizations.

== Early and personal life ==
Karan is married and has five children and seven grandchildren.
