= Thakral Corporation =

Singaporean logistics corporation

Thakral Corporation Ltd. (Chinese: 德加拉集团) is a diversified company listed on the Singapore stock exchange (SGX: T04 ) involved in manufacturing, logistics and property development in India, China and south-east Asia.

Kartar Singh Thakral is the Executive Chairman of the Board — he joined his family's trading business in 1949, which now includes Singapore-listed Thakral Corp., which distributes tech gear such as iPods in China and India, and Australian property group Thakral Holdings. Son Inderbethal helps run the business. Forbes ranked him as the 25th richest person in Singapore in 2006, with a fortune of $175 million.

The company is engaged in the supply chain management in the consumer electronics sector, electronic manufacturing services (EMS), creation of technology products, as well as property and equity investments. It has four core activities: supply chain management, marketing and brand building; EMS; property holding division, and others. Its brand portfolio includes Apple, Asus, Canon, Casio, Cisco, Fuji, Kodak, Lenovo, Nikon, Nokia, Olympus, Orion, Panasonic, Pentax, Samsung and Sony. Some of the products distributed under these brands include digital video cameras, digital still cameras, plasma televisions, desktop and notebook computers, personal digital assistants, data projectors, electronic accessories, mobile phones and audio products, including Moving Picture Experts Group layer-3 audio/ Moving Picture Experts Group layer-4 audio/ Moving Picture Experts Group layer-5 audio (MP3/MP4/MP5) players. It also creates and markets consumer products under its own brand name, YES.

== Chinese subsidiary ==
CAV Thakral Home Entertainment Co, Ltd. (Chinese: 中录德加拉家庭娱乐有限公司) is a Chinese company that distributes DVDs, VCDs and CDs. It has released many DVDs and VCDs with movies from Disney, Warner Bros. Pictures, MGM, 20th Century Studios and Paramount Pictures. It is the largest distributor of Hollywood films on video in China. In 2006, CAV Thakral was defunct and absorbed into Excel Media.

== See also ==
- Karan Singh Thakral
