= Farrer Park address =

The Farrer Park address was an assembly of the surrendered Indian troops of the British Indian Army held at Farrer Park (now the Farrer Park Field) in Singapore on 17 February 1942, two days after the Fall of Singapore. The assembly was marked by a series of three addresses in which the British Malaya Command formally surrendered the Indian troops of the British Indian Army to Major Fujiwara Iwaichi representing the Japanese military authority, followed by transfer of authority by Fujiwara to the command of Mohan Singh, and a subsequent address by Mohan Singh to the gathered troops declaring the formation of the Indian National Army to fight the Raj, asking for volunteers to join the army.

== Early Japanese efforts ==
At the onset of the war, the Japanese IGHQ in October 1941 sent intelligence missions, notably the Fujiwara Kikan, or the F-kikan headed by Major Fujiwara Iwaichi, in Bangkok. The kikan was tasked with intelligence gathering and contacting the Indian independence movement, the overseas Chinese and the Malayan Sultan with the aim of encouraging friendship and cooperation with Japan and destabilising the British war effort in Malaya. Fujiwara successfully established contact with Indian revolutionaries living in exile in Thailand, notably with Swami Satyananda Puri and Giani Pritam Singh, which saw the foundations of the Indian Independence League being formed. With Pritam Singh, Fujiwara sought to establish contacts within the British Indian Army at Malaya.

After the war started in South east Asia and Japan successfully invaded the Malaya, Fujiwara came to meet with Capt. Mohan Singh. Mohan Singh had, as a captain in the British Indian Army, seen action with the 1/14th Punjab Regiment against Japanese forces at Jitra, where his troops were outgunned and shattered by Japanese tanks. Captured by Japanese troops after several days in the Jungle, Singh was taken to Alor Star to Fujiwara and Pritam Singh at a joint office of the F-Kikan and the IIL. Fujiwara, later self-described as "Lawrence of the Indian National Army" (after Lawrence of Arabia) is said to have been a man committed to the values which his office was supposed to convey to the expatriate nationalist leaders, and found acceptance among them. Even before Singapore fell, the Japanese troops had started the process of identifying Indian troops among the captured and separating them from the Australian and British troops. On a number of occasions, it was noted, British and Australian officers were killed, while the Indians were spared.

Singapore surrendered on 15 February 1942. On the evening of the 16th, the Indian troops of the now amalgamated 1/14th and 5/14th Punjab were ordered by the Malaya command (of the commonwealth forces) to assemble at Farrer Park Field. The British officers were, in the meantime, ordered to assemble east to Changi.

== The Farrer Park addresses ==
On the morning of 17 February 1942, some 45,000 Indian POWs who gathered at Farrer Park where addressed by in turns, first by a Col Hunt of the Malaya Command, who handed over the troops to Japanese command under Fujiwara.

Fujiwara spoke to the troops in Japanese which was translated into English and then Hindustani. In his speech, Fujiwara is said to have told the troops of the Asian co-prosperity sphere under the leadership of Japan, of Japanese vision of an independent India and its importance to the co-prosperity sphere, and of the Japanese intentions to help raise a "liberation army" for the independence of India. He invited the troops seated at the park to join this army. Further, he told the troops, they were going to be treated not as PoWs, but as friends and allies. Fujiwara ended his speech stating he was passing on their responsibilities and command to Mohan Singh.

Mohan Singh's speech, in Hindustani, was short. He told the troops of forming the Indian National Army to fight for an independent India, and invited the troops to join it. As an Indian Jawan present at the time remembers, Mohan Singh's speech was powerful and touched a chord, and the troops responded with wild enthusiasm and excitement.

The Japanese forces, eager to engage the co-operation of the troops and further lacking the man-power, did not have the men impounded. The supreme command of the INA was set up at Mount Pleasant suburbs in the Northern part of the City. The PoW headquarters, along with the largest PoW camp was set up at Neesoon under M. Z. Kiani. Other smaller PoW camps housing Indian troops were set up at Bidadari, Tyersall, Buller, Seletar and Kranji. To Lt. Col N.S Gill went the overall direction of PoW.

== Significance ==
Controversy exists as to what was actually said by Hunt in the first of the three speeches, while handing over the troops to Japanese authority. Fay writes in 1993 that a number of the troops gathered at the park remembers Hunt as having told the troops that they now belonged to the Japanese army and should obey their orders while Hunt only remembers having said that they were all Prisoners of War of the Japanese. Nevertheless, Fay also points out that the fact that they were all POWs was already self-evident, and the fact that they were addressed separately implies some significance. A number of INA veterans present at the event also insist that Hunt's speech effectively told them they were under Japanese control and command. This also fed a feeling of devaluation (handed over like cattle, as Shah Nawaz Khan later put it), abandonment and of dishonour on part of the British high command that they perceived to have served loyally. In the days and years to come, a number of INA men cited this act of abandonment a major reason to join the first INA. It is estimated that nearly half of those present at Farrer Park Field later joined the first INA. Significantly however, a large number of Indian officers decided not to, which also kept those under their command disinclined.

During the Red Fort Trials, one of the arguments made by Bhulabhai Desai for the defence was that the Malayan command had abandoned the responsibility it had to these troops, allowing the Indian troops to be separated from the rest against the laws of treatment to Prisoners of War and formally handing them over to Fujiwara. This, Bhiulabhai argued, legitimised the subsequent adoption of allegiance to Azad Hind by the troops since their original oath to the King emperor had been nullified by this act of the Malaya Command. Hunt, who was in England during the trial, was called to give evidence but refused on grounds of ill-health.

== See also ==
- Cathay Building, where Subhash Chandra Bose proclaimed Free India
- Farrer Park Field, site of Farrer Park Address
- Former Indian National Army Monument,
- INA Martyrs' Memorial
- Indian National Army in Singapore
- Tyersall Park, INA camp commandeered by General Gurbaksh Singh Dhillon
