= First Indian National Army =

Indian National Army as it existed between February and December, 1942

The First Indian National Army (First INA) was the Indian National Army as it existed between February and December 1942. General Mohan Singh was the leader of the First Indian National Army. It was formed with Japanese aid and support after the Fall of Singapore and consisted of approximately 12,000 of the 40,000 Indian prisoners of war who were captured either during the Malayan campaign or surrendered at Singapore. It was formally proclaimed in April 1942 and declared the subordinate military wing of the Indian Independence League in June that year.

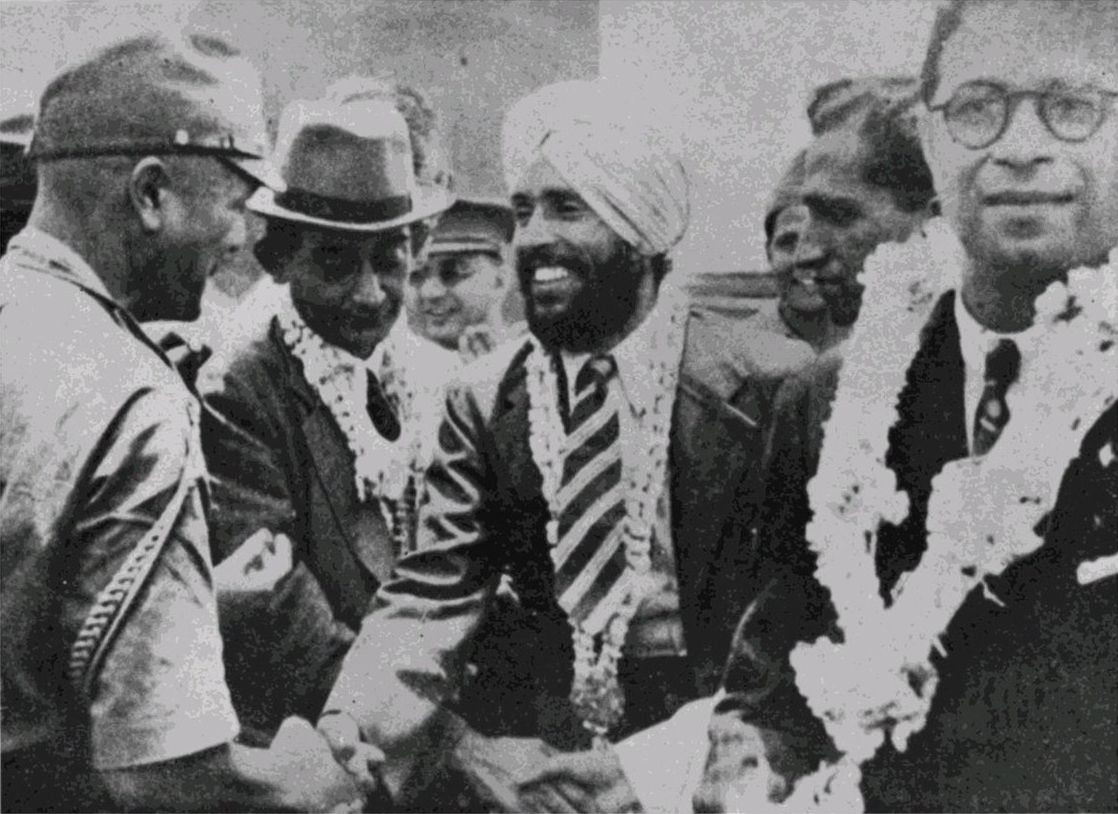
General Mohan Singh (in turban), leader of the first Indian National Army being greeted by the Japanese Major Fujiwara, April 1942.

This first incarnation of the Indian National Army was involved in operations of espionage in the Burma frontier which, according to some military historians and allied generals, threatened the morale of Indian troops and fed discontentment and was partly responsible for the failure of the first Burma offensive. Operatives of the INA were also landed in the Indian coast by submarine for planned espionage operations within India. Coming at the time that the Quit India Movement had raised turmoil within British India, the threat of the INA affecting British Indian troops and INA operatives mounting espionage within India saw the start of a propaganda campaign in the British Indian Army and a news ban on the unit that was not to be lifted till after the war ended.

The unit was dissolved in December 1942 after apprehensions of Japanese motives with regard to the INA led to disagreements and distrust between Mohan Singh and INA leadership on one hand, and the League's leadership, most notably Rash Behari Bose. Later on, the leadership of the Indian National Army was handed to Subhas Chandra Bose. A large number of the INAs initial volunteers, however, later went on to join the INA in its second incarnation under Subhas Chandra Bose.

== Background ==
=== Indian nationalism in World War II ===
With the onset of the Second World War all the three major Axis powers, at some stage of their campaign against Britain, sought to support and exploit Indian nationalism. They aided the recruitment of a military force from within Indian expatriates, and from disaffected Indian prisoners-of-war captured while serving with the British Commonwealth forces. Italy in 1942 created Battaglione Azad Hindoustan, formed of ex-Indian Army personnel and Italians previously resident in India and Persia, led by Iqbal Shedai. This unit ultimately served under Raggruppamento Centri Militari, but the effort proved unsuccessful. It was overtly propagandist nature that ultimately found little acceptance among the Indian soldiers, while Shedai's leadership was seen to be lacking legitimacy by the troops. By November 1942, following the defeats in El Alamein, the Italian efforts had failed.

German motives and intentions with relation to India were more complex. The German Foreign office wanted to support Indian revolutionaries and nationalists, but there is consensus that, ultimately, Hitler held the belief that the British had to rule over the unfit Indian masses. However Subhas Chandra Bose, who was one of the most prominent leaders of the Indian movement at the time (rivalling Gandhi in stature), arrived in Germany in April 1941 after escaping from house arrest in Calcutta. He met with Hitler (with whom he had one meeting) and the Nazi high command, making the case for raising an Indian unit from Rommel's Indian prisoners of war from the battlefields of Europe and Africa, as the nucleus of an Indian Liberation force. The Indische Legion was thus formed. In January 1942, a small contingent parachuted into Eastern Iran with a Brandenburg unit to commence sabotage operations against the British. Most of the legion however only ever saw action in Europe, fighting as a Heer unit and later incorporated into the Waffen SS (as were other national legions of the Wehrmacht) after the Allied invasion of France. Nearly thirty, including the leadership and the officer corps, were also transferred to Azad Hind after its formation, and saw action in the INA's Burma Campaign. A segment of the Free India Legion fought against British and Polish Forces in Italy in 1944.

=== British-Indian army in Malaya ===
Large number of Indian troops had begun arriving in Malayan peninsula and Singapore by 1941, as a part of defensive preparations for possible war with Japan. It was estimated that were some 37 000 Indian troops stationed in these areas, making up roughly about the 40 percent of the total military strength of the British forces. The British-Indian troops swelled from 200 000 to 900 000 between 1939 and 1941. However, these deployments were beset with a number of problems. The troops were spread too thinly, with insufficient resources and supplies in the Malay Peninsula and Singapore. Further, a large proportion of the British-Indian troops were very young recruits (as a result of the open recruitment policy of the British) who had very little or no combat training and experience, leading to anxiety amongst the British-Indian forces. Feelings of discrimination amongst British Indian soldiers, compared to the pay and service conditions for European soldiers created acrimony. Indiscriminate recruitment by the Indian government in order to maintain the numbers for its army, meant that it was no longer carefully curating its selection for the armed forces. By 1941, both verbal and physical abuse directed by European soldiers towards their Indian counterparts was rampant.

== Japan and Indian nationalism ==
India and Japan, especially from the last decade of the 19th century, had enjoyed a growing exchange of cultural, religious and philosophical ideas. India, as the home of Hinduism and from the second decade of the 20th century, the home of Gandhian philosophy, had been an attraction for Japanese and Buddhist and literary figures. India, in the meantime, looked to Japan as an inspiration of a model industrialised, advancing Asian society and nationhood. The Japanese victory over Russia in 1905 had furthered the inspiration Japan infused, especially among Indian nationalists. Noted Indian and Japanese cultural figures, including Okakura Tenshin and Rabindranath Tagore acknowledged the connection of the two Asian nations, their heritage, and the vision of pan-Asianism.

After the end of World War I, Japan increasingly became a haven for radical Indian nationalists in exile, who were protected by patriotic Japanese societies. Notable among these included Rash Behari Bose, Taraknath Das, A M Sahay as well as others. The protections offered to these nationalists effectively prevented British efforts to repatriate them and became a major policy concern.

By the end of the war however, the pan-Asiatic vision gradually shifted away from prominence as the independence movement in India became engrossed in the issues facing post-war India. Agitations against the Rowlatt act, the Khilafat Movement protesting the removal of the Ottoman Caliph (an inflammatory issue among India's huge Muslim population), as well as Gandhi's Non-cooperation movement in 1922 demanding home rule took the centre stage. By the time that the pan-Asiatic regained any prominence, Japan's aggressive and often nihilistic war in China had robbed her of the high ground that Japan held among the Indian population, and among Indian nationalist leadership.

=== Japan's India Policy ===
At the outbreak of the war in south-east Asia, Japan had not formulated any concrete policy with regard to India. Its headquarters lacked any India experts, while civilian experts on India were few in Japan. India was peripheral to Japanese war plans at least through 1941. It did not feature in the plans for Greater East Asia Co-Prosperity Sphere, which focused on south-east Asia up to the Indo-Burmese border.

From late 1941 the Japanese began to profess increasing support for the Indian Independence movement. Exiles like Rash Behari Bose had already voiced their demands to the Japanese authorities that support and pursuit of Indian Independence be an aim of the Japanese campaign, but neither the government nor the Imperial Japanese army were able to commit to these earlier. Militarily, India was important as the origin (from Assam) of the Ledo road which supplied Nationalist Chinese and American forces, as well as the supplies airlifted over The Hump. Also, the idea that the western boundary of Japan's empire would be controlled by a more friendly government was attractive. It would also have been consistent with the idea that Japanese expansion into Asia was part of an effort to support Asian government of Asia and against western colonialism. Nonetheless, the task of establishing a stable orderly state if the independence movement succeeded would be enormous. The army would be occupied in China and the Manchuria-Russia border and in the newly occupied territories. It was widely accepted that the Congress was anti-Japanese. Gandhi, even during the intense Quit India Movement, had categorically warned the Japanese

"Make no mistake. You will be sadly disillusioned if you believe that you will receive a willing welcome from India"

However, in April 1941, the Consul General to Calcutta had noted activities of the Forward Bloc. From Berlin, ambassador Oshima Hiroshi had reported on Subhas Bose's organisation of the Free India Legion.

The successful Malayan campaign, and the subsequent Burma campaign brought under Japanese administration a large number of Indian expatriates. Although not essentially sympathetic to the Japanese (some were even hostile), they held substantial nationalist motives, and sought to exploit the window offered by the reversal faced by the British forces to drive them out from the Indian sub-continent. In these circumstances, the Japanese military administration encouraged the various disparate Indian nationalist groups in East Asia to form an anti-British alliance. These came together to form the Indian Independence League (IIL), with its headquarters in Singapore. The IIL was also responsible for the welfare of Indian communities in East Asia. From the Japanese point of view, this was primarily a propaganda move of initiating anti-British sentiments among civilians and soldiers in South-east Asia, and some Indian organisations like the Thai-Bharat Cultural Lodge held mistrust of the Japanese, and of local Indians who worked with them. The lodge preferred to work independently, and used Thai-donated equipment and the German embassy in Bangkok to Liaise directly with Subhas Chandra Bose.

=== F Kikan ===
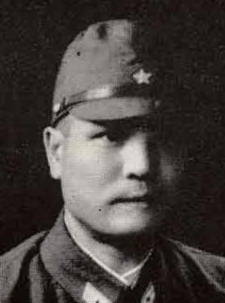
Maj. I Fujiwara, who spearheaded Japanese intelligence mission in South-east Asia early in the Malayan Campaign.

By the end of 1941, India had started featuring prominently in the Japanese policies. By early 1942, Tōjō's speeches to the Diet included specific references to the independence of India and to decisions to strike the British colonial authority in India. Specific plans for the invasion of India were, however, not formulated. The Japanese IGHQ in October set up the Fujiwara Kikan, or the F-kikan, in Bangkok, headed by the Major Fujiwara Iwaichi, chief of intelligence of the 15th army. Tasked with intelligence gathering and contacting the Indian independence movement, the overseas Chinese and the Malayan Sultan with the aim of encouraging friendship and cooperation with Japan, Fujiwara's staff included five commissioned officers and two Hindi-speaking interpreters. Fujiwara, later self-described as "Lawrence of the Indian National Army" (after Lawrence of Arabia) is said to have been a man committed to the values which his office was supposed to convey to the expatriate nationalist leaders, and found acceptance among them. His initial contact was with Giani Pritam Singh and after the outbreak of the war and the Malayan invasion, with Capt. Mohan Singh. Mohan Singh had, as a captain in the British Indian Army, seen action with the 1/14th Punjab Regiment against Japanese forces at the Battle of Jitra, where his troops were outgunned and shattered by Japanese tanks. Captured by Japanese troops after several days in the Jungle, Singh was taken to Alor Star to Fujiwara and Pritam Singh at a joint office of the F-Kikan and the IIL. Along with Pritam Singh, Fujiwara with his sincerity of purpose and belief, convinced Mohan Singh to unite with the Japanese mission for the greater motive of Indian independence. This included the promise that he would be treated as an ally and a friend, and not a PoW. Singh initially helped Fujiwara to take control of the situation of looting and arson that had developed in Alor Star. By January 1942, Fujiwara was able to give positive reports on the success of Japan's India policy and suggested an eight-point policy that included aid for both the IIL and the INA, as well as encouragement of the independence movement within India. A liaison conference declared among other aims the "stimulation of the Indian independence movement". With Fujiwara's encouraging feedbacks in early 1942, the Japanese government and high-command sought to expand the scope and support for the evolving INA as well as the Japanese support for the independence movement. For this it sought the counsel of Rash Behari Bose. Rash Behari Bose had lived in self-exile in Japan since the 1920s. He encouraged the formation of the INA, but also sought to attach it to a central civilian authority speaking for and encouraging Indian civilian Indian population of the region to become a part of it. The framework of local Indian associations that existed before the war reached Malaya were rekindled.

== The first INA ==
In December 1941, after meeting with the Japanese commanding general, Rash Behari Bose was convinced of the feasibility of raising an armed Indian unit. Between himself, Rash behari Bose, Pritam Singh and Fujiwara, formulated plans of contacting Indians in the British Indian Army in South-east Asia. The fall of Malaya further brought under Japanese control approximately 45,000 regular Indian troops from Gen. Percival's command in Malaya, including a large numbers of the remnants of the Indian III Corps. Even before Singapore fell, the Japanese troops had started the process of identifying Indian troops among the captured and separating them from the Australian and British troops. On a number of occasions, it was noted, British and Australian officers were killed, while the Indians spared. Singh began recruiting from amongst these captured Indian soldiers. Thus the nucleus what came to be the Indian National Army was born.

The units that were formed in this predecessor of the INA numbered about 200. They were volunteers from within the British Indian soldiers captured in Malaya. They were issued rifles and given armbands bearing the letter "F". They were organised into units and trained and worked along with those already under Pritam Singh in Malaya and Thailand. They were further tasked to work amongst fighting British-Indian Army units to foment dissent and encourage defection. Before the fall of Singapore, these troops grew to number nearly 2,500. There was significant deviation from the British Indian Army. Officers were organised into a single class, a common kitchen (opposed to caste-based kitchen as had been the norm), common slogans were adopted. All these efforts attempted to bridge any communal and casteist rivalries that were accepted or even institutionalised in the British Indian Army.

On 10 March 1942, the Indian soldiers at Christmas Island mutinied, allowing the Japanese forces to land unopposed at the Battle of Christmas Island. This was followed by a mutiny in the Ceylon Garrison Artillery in the Cocos Islands. However, the Cocos Islands Mutiny failed after it was quickly put down by the Ceylon Light Infantry. Sri Lankans in Singapore and Malaya formed the 'Lanka Regiment' of the Indian National Army. An abortive plan was made to land these troops in Sri Lanka by submarine.

=== Farrer Park ===
Singapore surrendered on 15 February 1942. On the evening of the 16th, the Indian troops of the now amalgamated 1/14th and 5/14th Punjab were ordered by the Malaya command of the Commonwealth forces to assemble at Farrer Park. The British officers were, in the meantime, ordered to assemble east to Changi. On the morning of 17 February 1942, some 45,000 Indian POWs who gathered at Farrer Park where addressed by in turns, first by a Col Hunt of the Malaya Command, who handed over the troops to Japanese command under Fujiwara.

Fujiwara spoke to the troops in Japanese which was translated into English and then Hindustani. In his speech, Fujiwara is said to have told the troops of the Asian co-prosperity sphere under the leadership of Japan, of Japanese vision of an independent India and its importance to the co-prosperity sphere, and of the Japanese intentions to help raise a "liberation army" for the independence of India. He invited the troops seated at the park to join this army. Further, he told the troops, they were going to be treated not as PoWs, but as friends and allies. Fujiwara ended his speech stating he is passing on their responsibilities and command to Mohan Singh.

Mohan Singh's speech, in Hindustani, was short. He told the troops of forming the Indian National Army to fight for an independent India, and invited the troops to join it. As an Indian Jawan present at the time remembers, Mohan Singh's speech was powerful and touched a chord, and the troops responded with wild enthusiasm and excitement. It is estimated that nearly half of those present at Farrer Park later joined the first INA. Significantly however, a large number of Indian officers decided not to, which also kept those under their command disinclined.

The Japanese forces, eager to engage the co-operation of the troops and further lacking the man-power, did not have the men impounded. The supreme command of the INA was set up at Mount Pleasant suburbs in the Northern part of Singapore. The PoW headquarters, along with the largest PoW camp was set up at Neesoon under M. Z. Kiani. Other smaller PoW camps housing Indian troops were set up at Bidadari, Tyersall, Buller, Seletar and Kranji. To Lt. Col N.S Gill went the overall direction of PoW.

It would not be until 9 May 1942 that the INA would come into full effect. However, following the events of Farrer Park, Indians in Singapore begun to enjoy special privileges during the Japanese 'pacification' of Singapore . The Japanese treated the Indians and Chinese differently during this period. During these early months, it was reported that roughly 50 000 Chinese in Singapore and the Malayan Peninsula were brutally killed in what is now known as the 'Sook Ching Massacre' . In contrast, the Indians received far more lenient treatment. However, this is not to say that the Indians felt no fear at all. In fact, the attitudes of the Japanese forces towards the Chinese population did instill some fear in the general Indian civilian population as well as leaders such as Pritam Singh. This was significant or the Indian leaders, during the Farrer Park meeting who had expressed reservations about collaborating with the Japanese as these incidents further cemented their initial beliefs about the cruel nature of the Japanese and would further affirm their decision to not join the INA in May 1942.

=== Indian Independence League ===
In April 1942, as the discussions and the process of setting up the Indian Independence League and defining the aims of the movement carried on, Mohan Singh convened a meeting of a group of his officers to frame what is now called the Bidadary resolution. This resolution announced that:

Indians stood above all differences of caste, community, or religion. Independence was every Indian's birthright. An Indian National Army would be raised to fight for it.

The resolution further specified that the army would go to battle only when the Congress and the people of India asked it to. It did not, however, specify the army was to interact with the Japanese forces. This resolution was circulated among the Indian PoWs, followed by tour of the mainland camps by Mohan Singh and Fujiwara. The PoW headquarters was subsequently dissolved and the staff were transferred to Mohan Singh's supreme command. On 9 May, Singh began recruiting for the INA. The process involved identifying units that were most likely to come up with volunteers. These units were transferred to Neesoon and Bidadary, while the other units were shipped away to other camps.

In April 1942— the same month as Mohan Singh formally declared the formation of the Indian National Army— he and other representatives of the INA and IIL, were invited to attend a conference in Tokyo at Rash Behari Bose's invitation. Rash Behari Bose also invited members of the Indian National Council to this meeting, which saw the declaration of the formation of the All-Malayan Indian Independence league. The League became the liaising organisation with the local Indian population and the Japanese. In June, the formation of an all-Indian IIL was proclaimed at Bangkok. In June 1942, a second conference was held in Bangkok with Rash Behari Bose as chair. This conference saw the adoption of a resolution declaring the INA sub-ordinate to the League. K.P.K Menon, Nedyam Raghavan were civilian members among the civilian members of the council while Mohan Singh and an officer by the name of Gilani were to be the INA's members. The Bangkok resolution further reaffirmed the Bidadary resolution that the INA was only to go to war when the Congress and the Indian population wished it to.

=== Autumn 1942 ===
On the back of the success of the INA, Fujiwara suggested in January 1942 expanding the work of the F-Kikan to all parts of Asia. In the spring of 1942, based on Fujiwara's own proposals, he was replaced by Col. Hideo Iwakuro. The Iwakuro Kikan (I-Kikan) was considerably larger, with some 250 officers and with offices in Rangoon, Penang, Saigon and Hong Kong. Iwakuro, the founder of the Army intelligence school Rikugun Nakano Gakko, was aware that the IGHQ did not have immediate plans to invade India. Using his expertise in intelligence and special missions, Iwakuro sought to train the Indian forces in sabotage, espionage and special operations. The I-Kikan and the League trained a number of INA recruits —and civilian volunteers from Malaya— in intelligence and subversion activities. Some of these training schools were opened in Burma and Singapore, the latter under the direction of N. Raghavan were called Swaraj (Independence in Hindi) schools. Graduates from these schools were sent by submarine or parachuted into India for starting intelligence work, subversion, and sabotage activities. Some historians suggest the intelligence services played a significant role in the failure of Noel Irwin's First Arakan Offensive.

Earnest organisation of the INA in preparation for the battle began after news of Quit India had reached South-east Asia. This uprising within India was taken to be the signal from Congress and Indian people that the INA and the league had been waiting for. Iwakuro visited Tokyo in August 1942, and on his return had expected to train and equip 15,000 men over three months. These men were to be moved to Burma in stages to avoid concentrating in Singapore. Mohan Singh's ambition, however, outpaced Iwakuro. Lists of men intending to enlist were collected from individual camp commanders. Hugh Toye, a British intelligence officer in South-east Asia during the war, noted in his 1959 history of the army that although Mohan Singh may not have personally approved forcible recruiting, the Bidadary "Concentration Camp" became notorious for beatings by "sweeper Nimbu". Mohan Singh himself, however, admitted to severity when it came to recruiting, warning non-volunteer officers to not influence their men. Persistent offenders were separated from their men. Over one hundred officers were separated from their men for such reasons. Some 40,000 men proceeded to pledge their allegiance to Mohan Singh for Indian independence. The British-Indian army sub-unit structure was preserved to hasten operational deployments. Almost 16,000 men comprised this first division of the INA. According to the reviews available, the INA was to be organised of twelve infantry battalions of 650 troops, organised into four guerrilla regiments of 2000 men. Battalion and regimental commanders were appointed on 5 September, and assumed their commands on 8 and 9 September. A few days later it was reviewed by Rash Behari Bose and Mohan Singh. The first of these was the Hindustan Field Force, under the command of J.K. Bhonsle. The unit was formed at Singapore and comprised three battalions derived from troops of the 17th Dogra Regiment, Garhwal Rifles and the 14th Punjab Regiment (now a part of the Pakistani Army) and had a strength of nearly 2000 troops. The Hindustan Field force was also to include a heavy gun battalion, a company each of transport corps, signal corps, engineering corps and a company of medical corps. The remaining four regiments, designated Gandhi, Nehru and Azad regiment, were to be a part of what was called the Sherdil Guerrilla group, each with three battalions. An additional Special Services Group was intended for long-range infiltration, and a reinforcement group to promote defection amongst the British Indian Army and recruit new members from PoWs. 50 officers and nearly 24,000 men were "surplus volunteers". Armament consisted of 5000 rifles, 250 light machine-guns, 500 sub machine-guns, 30 cars and 50 lorries. Toye points out in his 1959 history of the army that all of these were British armaments captured by Japanese, which were not subsequently replaced.

=== The end of the first INA ===
It was mainly from the intelligence and subversion training schools that the first frictions arose between the Indians and Japanese, as the trainees began to be sent before completing their training and without knowledge or consent of the Indian leaders. By late 1942, the divisions appeared as the Indian troops increasingly felt as pawns in the hands of the Japanese. Anticipating a thrust towards Imphal, both the Japanese strategists and INA command envisaged a role for the Indian troops. Initially, this was to begin with intelligence gathering missions. Niranjan Singh Gill was in charge of intelligence and long-range penetration groups being deployed in the Burma-India border. Amongst operatives, Gill sent to Burma was a close associate who subsequently defected back to Commonwealth forces, followed by nearly eight other men. This was followed by the capture of a number of other operatives by Commonwealth forces. Both Hugh Toye and Joyce Lebra conclude in their research that Gill was, in fact, intending to escape back to commonwealth forces also. However, he was summoned back from Burma to Singapore by this time in November. Other members of the Indian Council also voiced their concerns and displeasure at what was seen as Japanese intrusion into INA's work. Raghavan, in charge of Swaraj schools training intelligence and espionage agents in Singapore, was enraged to find a number of his students dispatched to India without his approval or permission. Japanese efforts to censor Indian broadcasting in Singapore also brought forth rank disagreements which had culminated in the arrest of the Indian director of broadcasting. In addition to this, non-committal replies from Japan on the points raised by the council for action in the Bangkok resolutions raised the ire of Mohan Singh and League members. The final straw to this was a report to the council by an officer of the situation in Burma, where Japanese military administration refused or prevaricated to handover abandoned Indian property to the league, as demanded n the Bangkok resolutions. A group of Japanese officers meeting league members had very candidly declined to attach any importance to the Bangkok resolutions or to Indians. Amidst worsening tensions, a repeated attempt by the council for action to obtain Japanese reassurance and commitment was rebuffed by Iwakuro. By November, Mohan Singh and K.P.K. Menon refused to send a previously planned batch of INA soldiers to Burma, with the council for action rallying behind them. Despite Rash Behari Bose's attempts to smooth over differences between the INA and Japanese, a second demand for 900 INA men by the Japanese was refused. This was followed by a Japanese attempt to take command of Indian troops who had not enlisted in the INA, who had so far been under the custody of INA. In December N.S. Gill was arrested from Mohan Singh's home in Singapore, precipitating resignations of both the INA command and members of the council for action, along orders from Mohan Singh for the INA to disband. Mohan Singh was subsequently arrested by the Japanese and exiled to Pulau Ubin. A number of the Indian troops who chose to revert to PoW were subsequently sent away to labour camps in New Guinea or to work in the Death railway. Between December 1942 and February 1943, Rash Behari Bose tried but failed to keep the IIL and INA going. Thousands of INA soldiers returned to the status of POWs(prisoners of war) again and most of the IIL leaders resigned.

== Operations involving the first INA ==
=== Southeast Asia ===
The first INA, especially at the time of its inception with F Kikan, was involved in espionage and sabotage. From the time of initial Japanese landings in Malaya, INA volunteers infiltrated British-Indian battle lines inducing Indian soldiers to defect to the INA. This it did with the considerable success of hundred men each, under the command of Capt Allah Ditta, to the Singapore operations, accompanying the Konoe Imperial Guards. This token force played a marginal but significant role in the Battle of Singapore, helping the Konoe guards feint the attack on Ubin island on 7 and 8 February. In the subsequent fighting in Burma, the INA continued to operate espionage to draw Indian soldiers out of the commonwealth forces. The activities of these agents were addressed at the Sepoys and these found enough support to successfully encourage defection without attracting the attention of the officers commanding the units. Soon, defection by British Indian troops had become a problem significant and regular enough in the Burma theatre to form a regular part of the intelligence summaries in the first half of 1943.

The Quit India movement had reached a crescendo within India, while the continuing British reversals at Burma further affected the morale of the army. The Irwin's First Campaign had been contained and then beaten back by inferior Japanese forces at Donbaik. Intelligence analysis of the failure, as well as Irwin's own personal analysis of the campaign, attributed significant demoralisation and rising discontentment amongst Indian troops due to the subversive activity of INA agents at the frontline, as well as rising nationalist (or "Pro-Congress") sentiments.

=== Espionage in India ===
Although the Congress had conditionally supported the Allied war effort, following failure of the Cripps mission, the Quit India Movement was launched in India on 8 August 1942 that called for the British Raj to leave India or face a massive Civil Disobedience. Forewarned, the Raj quickly arrested the Congress leadership. However, foreplanning on the part of the Congress meant the movement continued at the local level, and quickly deteriorated into a leaderless act of defiance and descended into violence and general anarchy and mayhem. The movement created alarm amongst the high-command and significantly hindered the Allied war effort. In south-east Asia, this was perceived as the signal that the INA and the League expected to receive to start its war.

Intelligence summaries initially did not believe the INA to be a substantial force or have any purpose more than propaganda and espionage purposes. However, by the end of 1942, they had become aware of trained Indian espionage agents (of the INAs Special services group) who had infiltrated into India for the purpose of collecting intelligence, subversion of the army and the subversion of civilian loyalty. This information was derived to a large extent from some of the agents themselves who gave themselves up to the authorities after reaching India. However, the intelligence was also aware at this point of misinformation being spread about the INA itself by the agents who concealed their purpose and professed to pass on intelligence from local knowledge. More troubling for the military command were the activities of the INA agents in the battlefields of India's eastern frontier in Burma.

== Interactions ==
=== Japan ===
The army's co-existence with Imperial Japan was an uneasy one. Misgivings about Japanese intentions existed from early in the history of the army. Col N.S. Gill, in overall charge of Pow Camps, regarded Japanese overtures and intentions with caution Further, the close relation of Fujiwara and Mohan Singh was not replicated after the I-Kikan replaced Fujiwara's office. Iwakuro was considered less idealistic and romantic than Fujiwara. Iwakuro took his post at a time the Pacific War faced a higher priority among Japanese forces for materiel. and did not use his expertise to encourage the "true Indian army" that Fujiwara had envisioned. By some accounts he only engaged in as much development of the INA as would keep Mohan Singh happy. Within the league, members of the original Indian delegation to the Tokyo conference held reservations about serving Rash Behari Bose, and of ultimate Japanese intentions with regard to independent India. Rash Behari Bose had lived in Japan for a considerable length of time, married a Japanese woman, and his son had enlisted in the Imperial army. Among the thirty-four points of the Bangkok resolution, the INA and the IIL raised a number of questions and sought clarifications. These included the role and position of India in Japan's co-prosperity sphere, Japan's intentions in – and towards – an independent India. These were presented via the Iwakuro Kikan after the Bangkok conference, and a point-by-point answer were demanded for each. Tokyo, however, was not able to give assurances of the kind sought by the league and the INA, which was seen as unacceptable to the council formed at the time of the Bangkok conference.

The Indian National Congress had conditionally supported the Allied war effort, and the Indian expatriate nationalists were concerned during this early phase that they might be seen as Quislings. This was particularly strong amongst members of the Thai-Bharat Cultural Lodge, which together with the IIL formed what was called the Indian National Council. Swami Satyananda Puri, a prominent member of the Lodge reportedly mentioned before the Tokyo conference that Nehru had forbidden Indians residing outside India from interfering in her internal politics. It was in this context that in a meeting in Singapore in March 1942, a unanimous decisions were taken to seek approval of the Indian National Congress for taking Japanese assistance, and to press for Subhash Chandra Bose to assume leadership of the movement.

=== British Indian Army ===
British intelligence was unaware of the formation of the army until around July 1942. The existence of "fifth columnists" influencing Indian troops had been noted even during the Malayan campaign. In some units, British officers were shot by their own troops during the Japanese onslaught in Malaya. Even then British intelligence was unclear of the scale, purpose and organisation of the INA till much later. The propaganda threat of the INA, coupled with the lack of concrete intelligence on the unit early after the fall of Singapore, led to considerable consternation among the political and military leadership of the Government of India when first reports started reaching it. In operational terms, the work of the Hindustan field force threatened to destroy the Sepoy's loyalty in the British Indian Army, This threat was perceived significant enough that the failure of the First Arakan Offensive was attributed by Commonwealth commanders to the "lack of martial skills of eastern races". British intelligence began the Jiffs propaganda campaign after this to preserve the sepoy's moral and loyalty. At this time also began efforts to improve morale the Sepoy in order to consolidate and prepare for defence of Manipur. These measures included imposing a complete news ban on the INA, that was not lifted till four days after the fall of Rangoon two years later. Notably however, a number of the units first deployed forward by the INA (most of which were intelligence and espionage units) either defected back to British or were captured on intelligence given away by defectors. The allegiance and loyalty of Indian officers trained in Sandhurst may have played a part in this conflict of loyalties.

== Second INA ==
Between December 1942 and February 1943, Rash Behari Bose struggled to hold together the INA. On 15 February 1943, the Army itself was put under the command of Lt. Col. M.Z. Kiani. A policy forming body was formed with Lt. Col J.R. Bhonsle, Director of the Military Bureau, in charge and clearly placed under the authority of the IIL. Under Bhonsle served Lt. Col. Shah Nawaz Khan as Chief of General Staff, Major P.K. Sahgal as Military Secretary, Major Habib ur Rahman as commandant of the Officers' Training School and Lt. Col. A.C. Chatterji (later Major A.D. Jahangir) as head of enlightenment and culture. A number of the officers and troops who had returned to PoW camps, or had not volunteered in the first place, made it known that they would be willing to join the INA only on the condition that it was led by Subhash Chandra Bose. Bose was a hard-line nationalist, previously having won the presidency of Indian National Congress in the 1930s in the face of staunch opposition from Gandhi, who disagreed with Bose's approach to radical nationalism. Bose had, at the start of the war in Europe, escaped from house arrest to make his way first to the Soviet Union and then to Germany, reaching Berlin on 2 April 1941. In a series of meetings between the INA leaders and the Japanese in 1943, it was decided to cede the leadership of the IIL and the INA to Subhas Chandra Bose. In January 1943, the Japanese invited Bose to lead the Indian nationalist movement in East Asia. He accepted and left Germany on 8 February. After a three-month journey by submarine, and a short stop in Singapore, he reached Tokyo on 11 May 1943, where he made a number of radio broadcasts to the Indian communities, exhorting them to join in the fight for India's Independence. The INA was revived, and the units of dissolved INA were incorporated into Bose's army. The Hindustan Field Force formed the nucleus of the new INA's 2nd division, to form the 1st Infantry regiment. The first INA, therefore, formed the nucleus of the army under Bose's leadership, which he proclaimed the army of his Provisional Government of Free India. It drew a large number of civilian volunteers from Indian diaspora in south-east Asia, eventually growing to a unit of almost forty thousand soldiers.

== See also ==
- Iwaichi Fujiwara
- Mohan Singh
- Rash Behari Bose
- Battle of Singapore
- Joyce Lebra
- Peter Fay
- Hugh Toye

== Bibliography ==
- Aldrich, Ricjard J (2000), Intelligence and the War Against Japan: Britain, America and the Politics of Secret Service, Cambridge University Press, ISBN 0-521-64186-1.
- Allen, L. (1971), (in Reviews) Modern Asian Studies, Vol. 5, No. 1. (1971)pp. 89–92., Cambridge University Press., JSTOR 311662.
- Brown, Emily (1986), "(in Book Reviews; South Asia). The Journal of Asian Studies, Vol. 45, No. 2.", Pacific Affairs, Pacific Affairs, University of British Columbia., ISSN 0030-851X.
- Cohen, Stephen C. (1983), (in Book Reviews) Pacific Affairs, Vol. 56, No. 2. pp. 350–352, New York, Columbia University Press, ISBN 0-231-03995-6.
- Dignan, Don. (1983), The Indian revolutionary problem in British Diplomacy,1914–1919., New Delhi, Allied Publishers..
- Fay, Peter W. (1993), The Forgotten Army: India's Armed Struggle for Independence, 1942–1945., Ann Arbor, University of Michigan Press., ISBN 0-472-08342-2.
- Friedman, Irving S. (1940), "Pacific Affairs, Vol. 13, No. 1.", Pacific Affairs, Pacific Affairs, University of British Columbia., ISSN 0030-851X.
- Ghosh, K.K (1969), The Indian National Army: Second Front of the Indian Independence Movement., Meerut, Meenakshi Prakashan.
- Green, L.C. (1948), The Indian National Army Trials. The Modern Law Review, Vol. 11, No. 1. (Jan., 1948), pp. 47–69., London, Blackwell..
- Hauner, Milan (1981), India in Axis Strategy. Germany, Japan and Indian Nationalists in the Second World War, Stuttgart, Klett-Cotta., ISBN 3-12-915340-3.
- Kaushik, Karuna (1984), Russian Revolution (1917) and Indian nationalism:Studies of Lajpat Rai, Subhash Chandra Bose and Ram Manohar Lohia, Delhi, Chanakya Publications..
- Kurowski, Franz (1997), The Brandenburgers Global Mission., Fedorowicz (J.J.), Canada., ISBN 0-921991-38-X.
- Lebra, Joyce C. (1977), Japanese trained armies in South-East Asia, New York, Columbia University Press, ISBN 0-231-03995-6.
- Lebra, Joyce C. (2008), The Indian National Army and Japan, Institute of Southeast Asian Studies., ISBN 978-981-230-806-1.
- Littlejohn, Davis (1987), Foreign Legions of the Third Reich, Vol 4: Poland, the Ukraine, Bulgaria, Romania, Free India, Estonia, Latvia, Lithuania, Finland and Russia, San Jose, Bender Publishing., ISBN 0-912138-36-X.
- Lundari, Giuseppe (1989), I paracadutisti italiani 1937/45, Milan, E.M.I..
- Moreman, T.R. (2005), The Jungle, the Japanese and the British Commonwealth Armies at War 1941–1945: Fighting Methods, Doctrine and Training for Jungle Warfare., London and New York: Frank Cass., ISBN 0-7146-4970-8.
- Munoz, Antonio J. (2002), The East Came West: Muslim, Hindu & Buddhist Volunteers in the German Armed Forces, 1941–1945., Axis Europa Books., ISBN 1-891227-39-4.
- Slim, W. (1961), Defeat into Victory., New York, David McKay., ISBN 1-56849-077-1.
- Tojo, Hideki (Premier) . (1943), Axis War Makes Easier Task of Indians. Chandra Bose's Berlin Speech. Syonan Simbun, Domei.
- Toye, Hugh (1959), The Springing Tiger: A Study of the Indian National Army and of Netaji Subhas Chandra Bose, Allied Publishers.
