= Bidadari Resolutions =

1942 Indian National Army resolutions

The Bidadari Resolutions were set of resolutions adopted by the nascent Indian National Army in April 1942 that declared the formation of the INA and its aim to launch an armed struggle for Indian independence. The resolution was declared at a prisoner-of-war camp at the Bidadari (Bidadri PoW camp) in Singapore during Japanese occupation of the island.

== Fall of Singapore ==
The fall of Singapore on 15 February 1942 brought under the Japanese occupation approximately 45,000 Indian PoWs. The surrender of these PoWs were accepted by Major Fujiwara Iwaichi, separately from that of British PoWs, on the morning of 17th at Farrer Park Field. Fujiwara passed on their command to Mohan Singh, who had formulated the conception of a liberation army for India's Independence, accepted their command and invited the PoWs to join his proposed army. A large number of the troops volunteered. Following this, the plans to formally establish the Indian National Army as the armed unit of the Indian Independence League were started. However, officers within the Indian Pow sought to establish clearly the Japanese intentions and designs for the army and clarification of its goals.

== Bidadary resolution ==
In April 1942, even as the discussions and the process of setting up the Indian Independence League and defining the aims of the movement carried on, Mohan Singh convened a meeting of a group of his officers to frame what has now come to be known as the Bidadary resolution. The resolution, declared by Mohan Singh Deb, announced that:

Indians stood above all differences of caste, community, or religion. Independence was every Indian's birthright. An Indian National Army would be raised to fight for it.

The resolution further specified that the army would go to battle only when the Congress and the people of India asked it to. It did not however, specify the how army was to interact with the Japanese forces.

== Effects of the resolution ==
Following the Bidadari resolutions, the Indian PoW camps were dissolved and the staff were transferred to the INA supreme command under Mohan Singh. On 9 May, recruiting for the INA began. Mohan Singh had copies of the resolution circulated among the Indian jawans, followed by tours of the mainland camps by Mohan Singh and Fujiwara to encourage the troops to join the INA. In June, a conference was held in Bangkok that saw the proclamation of the Indian Independence League and clearly established the relationship between the INA and the Japanese army and established the IIL as the master organisation of which the INA was to be the armed wing of. The Bidadary resolutions therefore formed the basis on which the subsequent organisations and orders of the first INA was built.

== See also ==
- Indian National Army in Singapore
- INA related context
  - 1915 Singapore Mutiny
  - First Indian National Army
  - Royal Indian Navy mutiny
  - Royal Air Force mutiny
  - History of Singapore
- General context
  - 1915 Singapore Mutiny
  - Greater India
  - History of Indian influence on Southeast Asia
  - History of Singaporean Indians
  - Hinduism in South East Asia
  - Indian diaspora
  - Indianisation
  - Indian Singaporeans
  - List of Hindu temples in Singapore
  - List of Indian organisations in Singapore
