= Bangkok Conference =

Indian nationalists form All-India Independence league

The Bangkok Conference was a conference held on 23 June 1942 by Indian Nationalist groups and local Indian Independence leagues at Bangkok to proclaim the formation of the All-India Independence league. The conference further saw the adoption by the league of a thirty-four set resolution known as the Bangkok resolutions that attempted to define the role of the league in the Independence movement, relations with the nascent Indian National Army, and clarify the grounds and conditions for obtaining Japanese support for it. The resolution further attempted to clarify the relations of Japan and the Greater East Asia Co-Prosperity Sphere with a free India.

== Indians in South-East Asia ==
=== Indian Independence League ===
The Indian Independence League was a political organisation operated from the 1920s to the 1940s to organize those living outside of India into seeking the removal of British colonial rule over India. Some accounts indicate it was founded in 1928 by Indian nationalists Subhas Chandra Bose and Jawaharlal Nehru, By the start of the war the organisation was located in various parts of South-East Asia and included Indian expatriates, and later, Indian nationalists in-exile under Japanese occupation following Japan's successful Malayan Campaign during the first part of the Second World War. Among the most prominent of the leaders was Giani Pritam Singh. The IIL also had links with local Indian clubs.

=== Indian National Council ===
The Indian National Council was founded in December 1941 in Bangkok by another group of Indian nationalists resident in Thailand. This organisation was founded from the Thai-Bharat Cultural Lodge on 22 December 1941. The founding president of the Council was Swami Satyananda Puri, along with Debnath Das as the founding secretary. Along with the Indian Independence League, it came to be one of the two prominent Indian associations that corresponded with I Fujiwara's F Kikan on the scopes of Japanese assistance to the Indian movement. However, the Indian National Council emphasised solidarity with the Indian National Congress and, at a time when Japan began its successful Malayan Campaign, the council reflected the Congress leadership's reluctance to appear Quisling of the Japanese. The council also had differences with the Indian Independence League, with Puri openly questioning Tokyo's anti-imperialist credibility in light of her actions in Korea and China. Puri was killed in a plane crash, along with Giani Pritam Singh en route to the Conference in Tokyo in 1942 that saw Rash Behari Bose accepted as the leader of the expatriate Indian movement in South-east Asia. Later, the council sent delegates to attend the Bangkok Conference.

=== First INA ===
The Indian National Army was initially formed under Capt Mohan Singh with Japanese aid and support after the Fall of Singapore and consisted of approximately 20,000 Indian prisoners of war who were captured either during the Malayan campaign or surrendered at Singapore. Although not formally proclaimed until September 1942, the unit rapidly came to be an important component of the Indian movement in South-east Asia and of Japanese projects and agenda in the region, especially with regards to her subsequent plans in the South-east Asian theatre.

=== Tokyo Conference ===
Following the end of the Malayan Campaign, and after Thailand's support to the Japanese campaign, these organisations were encouraged by Japan to unify the overseas Indian movement. Although differences existed between the organisations, they met at the Tokyo Conference in March 1942. It was while en route to this conference that the plane carrying Pritam Singh and Satyananda Puri crashed. However, although divided on the interests of different communities and regions and on the scopes and limits of Japanese interventions, the delegates agreed to a reorganisation of the Indian Independence League and accepted Rash Behari Bose as the leader of the organisation. The Tokyo conference, however, failed to reach any definitive decisions. A number of the Indian delegations held differences with Rash Behari, especially given his long connection with Japan and the current position of Japan as the occupying power in South-east Asia, and were wary of vested Japanese interests. The conference agreed to meet again in Bangkok at a future date. The Indian delegation returned to Singapore in April with Rash Behari.

The Bangkok conference opened on 22 June 1942 at the Silpakon theatre in Bangkok with an opening address by the Thai deputy foreign minister Wichit. Amongst the guests to this conference were the Japanese Ambassador Tsubokami Teiji, German minister Ernst Wendler, and the Italian minister Guido Crolla.

=== Outcomes ===
The conference defined the structure of the league as consisting of a Council for Action and a Committee of representatives below it. Below the committee was to be the territorial and local branches. Rash Behari Bose was to chair the council, while K.P.K Menon, Nedyam Raghavan were among the civilian members of the council. Mohan Singh and an officer by the name of Gilani were to be the INA's members. The committee of representatives took members from the 12 territories with Indian population, with representation proportional to the representative Indian population. The Bangkok resolution further decided that the Indian National Army was to be subordinate to it.

=== Bangkok Resolutions ===
The introduction to the resolution states:

That Indian be considered as ONE and indivisible. That all activities of this movement be on a national basis and not on sectional, communal or religious bases. That in view of the fact that the Indian National Congress is the only political organisation which could claim to represent the real interests of the people of India and as such acknowledged as the only body representing India, this conference is of the opinion that the program and plan of action of this Movement must be so guided, controlled and directed as to bring them in line with the aims and intentions of the Indian National Congress.

The resolution itself adopted a thirty-four point resolution, to each of which it expected the Japanese government to respond to. These included the demand that the Japanese government clearly, explicitly and publicly recognize India as an independent nation and the league as the nation's representatives and guardians. Other points also demanded assurances from the Japanese on Free India's relation with Japan, respect for her sovereignty and her territorial integrity, to all of which the council unanimously demanded that Japan clearly and unequivocally commit themselves before the league proceeded any further in collaboration. The resolution further demanded that the Indian National Army be accorded the status of an allied army and treated as such, and that all Indian Prisoners of Wars be released to the INA. The Japanese must help the army with loans, and not to ask it to march in any other purpose than for the liberation of India.

The resolution was duly passed on to what was then the Japanese liaison office, the Iwakuro Kikan.
