= Habib ur Rahman (Indian National Army officer) =

Indian National Army officer

Fateh-e-Bhimber Habib-ur-Rahman
- Born: 22 December 1913; Panjeri, Jammu and Kashmir, British India
- Died: 26 December 1978 (aged 65); Panjeri, Pakistan Occupied Kashmir, Pakistan
- Spouse: Badshah Begum
- Children: 2
- Military career
- Allegiance: British Raj (1936-1942); Free India (1942-1945); Pakistan (1947-?
- Awards: Sitara-e-Pakistan; Nishan-e-Imtiaz; Tamgha-e-Imtiaz; Tamgha-i-Khidmat

Habib-ur-Rahman (1913–1978) was an army officer in the Indian National Army (INA) who was charged with "waging war against His Majesty the King Emperor". He served as Subhas Chandra Bose's chief of staff in Singapore, and accompanied Bose on his alleged last fatal flight from Taipei to Tokyo, sharing the last moments of his life. Habib also played an important role in the First Kashmir War. Convinced that Maharaja Hari Singh was out to exterminate the Muslims of Jammu and Kashmir, he joined Major General Zaman Kiani, in launching a rebellion against the Maharaja from Gujrat in Pakistani Punjab. Rehman and his volunteer force launched an attack on the Bhimber town. But, the records of the 11th Cavalry of the Pakistan Army indicate that their efforts did not succeed, and eventually the Cavalry was responsible for conquering Bhimber.

== Early life and education ==
Habib ur Rahman, son of Raja Manzoor Ahmad Khan was born in the village of Panjeri, Mirpur District in Jammu and Kashmir, British India (now Bhimber District, Pakistan) on 22 December 1913. Born in a Muslim Rajput family, his maternal grandfather Raja Rahamdad served in the court of Maharaja Pratap Singh of Jammu and Kashmir. He was educated in schools in Panjeri and went to obtain graduation in Jammu. Afterwards, Rahman was enrolled at the Prince of Wales Royal Indian Military College, Dehradun and subsequently the Indian Military Academy.

== Military career ==
Rahman was commissioned a Second Lieutenant on the Special List, Indian Land Forces on 15 July 1936 and was attached to the 2nd battalion of Duke of Wellington's Regiment from 10 August 1936. He was appointed to the British Indian Army and was posted to 1st Battalion of the 14th Punjab Regiment, which was called "Sher Dil Paltan" on 10 August 1937. He was promoted Lieutenant 1 December 1937. His battalion moved from Lahore to Secunderabad in September 1940.

=== Overseas move ===
Soon after the second week of February 1941, Rahman and his battalion were ordered to move overseas. He left Secunderabad on 3 March 1941 for Penang Island and from there to Ipoh, north of Kuala Lumpur in Malaya. After about two months stay at Ipoh, their Battalion moved to Sungei Pattani in South Kedah as a part of the 5th Indian Infantry Brigade under Brigadier Ragnar Garrett.

The 3rd Cavalry was allotted the defence of the Island of Penang. He disembarked at Singapore and reported at 7 MRC, Mixed Reinforcement Camp at Bidadari. From Singapore he was sent to Jitra situated on the main road to Thailand, 26 kilometres (16 miles) south of the border. He arrived in Jitra on 5 December 1941.

=== World War II ===
Following the attack on Pearl Harbor and the bombing of Singapore on the early morning of 7 December 1941, the United States declared war on Japan. The Japanese forces completely destroyed the squadrons of the Royal Air Force at Sungei, (Note: Sungei is not a known town documented today, possible going by a different name, it may not be specific/complete enough or a writing mistake and misunderstanding of language by a foreign army, Sungei may possibly not actually refer to a town name) Alor Star and Kota Bharu airfields. On 11 December 1941, 1/14th Punjab Regiment fought a pitched battle at Changlun near the Thai frontier. Rahman was Battalion Signal Officer with his C.O. Col. L. V. Fitzpatrick who remained nearest to the front line. The Battle of Changlun went on for eight hours and was lost. The 1/14th Punjabs were not reformed after this battle. The town of Alor Star had also fallen.

On 13 December 1941 they arrived at Miami Beach near Penang. They were taken to 3 M.R.C. in Penang. At this time Penang was hurriedly evacuated. They were given the duty to guard a railway bridge at Nibong Tabol. They guarded the bridge for another two days till the arrival of the Japanese. Then they were ordered to withdraw to Ipoh where Rahman fell ill with malaria. He was hospitalised and sent to Singapore.

By the dawn of 9 February 1942, almost two divisions of the Japanese had landed on the soil of Singapore. On 10 February 1942, 7 MRC was moved to Raffles Square, a business area. By that time it was apparent that the surrender of Singapore was imminent. On 13 February 1942, Raffles Square was bombed. 7MRC suffered heavily with about 300 killed and many more wounded. The second-in-Command of 7 MRC, a British major and Rahman had a difficult job disposing of corpses. They dropped them in the ocean. Singapore capitulated on 15 February 1942 and its garrison surrendered unconditionally to the Japanese.

The defeated and demoralised Indian soldiers collected themselves at Farrer Park in Singapore. Major Fujiwara addressing the POWs expressed that it was his firm belief that world peace and the liberation of Asia could not be achieved and maintained without a free and independent India. He further said that if Indian POWs in Malaya were prepared to fight the British for the cause of achieving the independence of their motherland, the Imperial Japanese Government would advance all out-support. He suggested the formation of the Indian National Army. He handed over all the POWs in Malaya to Capt. Mohan Singh, the G.O.C. of the Indian National Army.

== Indian National Army ==
=== Formation of the INA ===
At the stage on Farrer Park Capt. Mohan Singh addressed the POWs and decided to form an organised and disciplined power in the form of Indian National Army. The erstwhile POWs were to become now the soldiers of India's "Army of Liberation", the army that was to fight under its own leadership, with a real and just cause to wage war.

Mohan Singh was from the same unit from which was Rahman. He was a close friend of Rahman. On 17 February 1942, Rahman decided to join the Indian National Army. Next morning Capt. Mohan Singh issued orders to march off all the units of various camps on the island where the units were to occupy their allotted accommodation. Rahman's unit was to proceed to Nee Soon Camp. Nee Soon village was situated 21 km (13 mi) away from the main town of Singapore. This camp was the Regimental Centre of the Singapore Royal Artillery.

The Japanese Headquarters had asked the Supreme Headquarters to provide 200 officers to guard the British and Australian prisoners of war at Changi Camp. Rahman took the risk and volunteered his services for this unpleasant task. At Changi Camp, Rahman and other Indians were asked by the Japanese to give up the British drill and words of command and adopt Japanese ones. Within a fortnight they learnt the Japanese drill and words of command. Here they kept the Allied POWs in five separate Camps – Australian Camp, Hospital area, 9th Indian Division Camp, 11th Indian Division Camp and 18th British Camp. Its own officer, usually a General residing in the Camp, commanded each Camp. Changi was under military control of Japanese as well as Rahman. Rahman inculcated amongst the prisoners the feelings of national unity, discipline and keen sense of duty through daily lectures personally delivered by him. After some time at Changi Camp Rahman fell seriously ill. He was released from the command of the Changi Garrison and sent to Seletar Camp and was admitted to POW Hospital.

=== Shaping the INA ===
Rahman's health improved at Seletar Camp. He along with over thirty important senior officers from among the Indian prisoners of war attended the Bidadari Conference called by Captain Mohan Singh at Bidadari Camp in Singapore on 24 April 1942. The resolutions of this Conference, came to be known as the Bidadari Resolutions, formed the backbone of formation of INA. As resolved at the Tokyo Conference, a representative conference of the Indians who lived in East Asian countries was held at Bangkok on 15 June 1942, which continued for 10 days. Thirty INA volunteers nominated by Mohan Singh among the Indian prisoners of war attended it. A resolution was passed at this conference known as Bangkok Resolution. Rahman got his National Commission on 1 September 1942 and was posted as major on 10 September 1942. He was still ill so he was attached to the Reinforcement Group.

The first review of INA was held at Singapore Padang in front of the Municipal Buildings on 2 October 1942, Rahman attended this function as an observer. The progress in recuperating Rahman's health was slow. He was recommended a month's leave and sent to Penang. He returned to Singapore in the middle of November 1942. The Japanese had not yet ratified the Bangkok resolutions not recognised the INA as an independent army. General Mohan Singh had lost confidence in the Japanese. In the beginning of December 1942, the Japanese asked the INA Headquarters to dispatch an advance party to move to Burma so as to prepare camps and accommodation for the main body of INA. Meanwhile, differences developed between Mohan Singh and the Japanese. The Japanese arrested General Mohan Singh on 29 December 1942. There was a period of crisis due to suspense and indecision. On the advice of Rash Behari Bose Rahman continued in INA. They went all over the Island and up-country to urge men to remain in the INA.

Meanwhile, Subhas Chandra Bose (Netaji) was trying to come to the East. In anticipation of Netaji's arrival, the revived INA was reorganised under its new headquarters known as Directorate of Military Bureau (DMB) with Col. J. R. Bhonsle as the Director. Rahman was appointed as Deputy Quartermaster General (DQMG) in the "Q" Branch at the Army Headquarters. He was to look after the Technical Branch and was responsible for the accommodation also. The Army Headquarters was organised by the middle of March 1943 and was duly gazetted on 17 April 1943. On appointment Rahman took up the task of collection of kit and clothing of those personnel who decided to leave the INA. When Netaji arrived on 2 July 1943 in Singapore and the Army was enlarged in December 1943, Rahman was transferred to be the 2nd-in-Command of the 5th Guerilla Regiment.

=== The 5th Guerrilla Regiment ===
Rahman was appointed Second-in-Command in December 1943, and raised the 5th Guerrilla regiment at Bidadari in Singapore. Apart from helping in raising the regiment Rahman was responsible for training, discipline, morale and welfare of the troops. The 5th Guerrilla Regiment was formed as part of the 2nd INA Division, which was organised under the command of Col. N.S. Bhagat consequent on the 1st Division's move to the Front.

On 30 March 1944, the 5th Guerrilla Regiment moved to Ipoh in Perak state of Malaya. Rahman proceeded with the advance party to make necessary arrangements for the Regiment.

=== Move to Burma ===
Rahman was sent to front at Alor Star in Infantry Regiment at Jitra. On 15 July 1944 they left Jitra for onward journey Kawashi, (Note: Kawashi is not a known town documented today, possible going by a different name, it may not be specific/complete enough or a writing mistake and misunderstanding of language by a foreign army, Kawashi may possibly not actually refer to a town name) Mergui and Tavoy through Thailand and then to Moulmein and Rangoon in Burma. They had a period of long stay at Bangkok. From Bangkok they flew on 21 August 1944 over to Rangoon by Netaji's personal aircraft, the "Azad Hind". At Rangoon they were accommodated in Mingaladon Camp about 23 km (14 mi) from Rangoon. Rahman was here officiating as the Deputy Adjutant General (DAG) and also the Deputy quartermaster General (DGMG)as well as the Commandant of the officer training school of INA when the first anniversary of the Provisional Government of Azad Hind came about. As part of the celebrations of the anniversary, the review of the 2nd Division of the INA was arranged at Mingaladon. It was part of duties of Rahman to make arrangements and issue orders for the ceremonial parade at the vast parade ground. The parade was held on 18 October 1944.

=== Subhas Chandra Bose ===
Rahman met Subhas Chandra Bose on 15 October 1944 at his residence in Rangoon. He again met him on 26 October 1944 after which Rahman was made Brigade Commander of the Jawaharlal Nehru Brigade. Towards the end of 1943, "The Nehru" was put under the First Division. It moved to Burma in early 1944 and arrived at Mandalay. The Nehru Brigade was deployed in the Myingyan area with the object of defending it against enemy attack, which appeared imminent consequent on their withdrawal from Imphal.

In the middle of December 1944, the Japanese Army Commander General S. Katamura visited The Nehru Brigade along with the general came Col. I. Fujiwara, the greatest supporter of the INA and one of the originators of the idea among the Japanese. Rahman was advised to expect the worst so that there was no disappointment later. Towards end of 1944, Netaji Subhas Chandra Bose gave Rahman the command of 4th Guerrilla Regiment also called the Nehru Brigade. His regiment distinguished itself in the battlefield. The Nehru Brigade was to hold the Irrawaddy River from Nyaungu in north to Pangan in south, both towns inclusive, and to hold the enemy crossing the Irrawaddy at those places.

Rahman formed an advance party from 9th Battalion and left for Pagan on 29 December 1944. Rahman ordered the move of battalions to leave Myingyan by 4 February 1945 so as to be in their respective positions by 8 February 1945. Rahman ensured all the arrangements. The Nehru Brigade held the Irrawaddy as planned. Rahman kept his Headquarters at Tetthe during this operation. On 12 February 1945 the enemy planes carried out saturation bombing on INA defences. On 13/14 February night enemy launched an assault in front of the 8th battalion deployed at Pagon. These assaults were failed and the enemy had to withdraw. The Nehru Brigade kept on holding the Irrawaddy and this was the first victory of INA. After the failure at Pagan the enemy tried another assault crossing opposite Nyaungu by using outboard motors and rubber boats. This assault was also failed and hundreds of enemies were killed or drowned. Having failed the enemy had no other choice but to retreat. This was another victory of INA. This could not sustain and INA had to withdraw and Rahman had to proceed to Pagan.

Rahman reached Pagan on 17 February 1945. On 23 February 1945, Col. Shah Nawaz visited the Commander of Khanjo Butai and discussed co-ordination of Indo-Japanese operations in the Popa and Kyauk Padaung area. Col. Sahgal was given the task to prepare Popa as a strong base with the view to take up an offensive role. Rahman's Regiment, the 4th Guerrilla, was assigned the duty to check the enemy advance on to Kyauk Padaung from the west, where the British had established a strong bridgehead at Nyaungu. This was to be achieved by carrying out an extensive and persistent guerrilla warfare in the area between Popa, Kyauk Padaung line in the east and as far forward towards the Irrawaddy as possible as to deny the enemy the use of Nyaungu-Kyauk-Padaullg-Meiktila metalled road for supplying reinforcements and supplies to his forces fighting in the battle of Meiktila. Shah Nawaz arrived Popa on 12 March 1945 and relieved Rahman forthwith to join his regiment.

On 4 April 1945 his Division Commander, Colonel Shah Nawaz Khan, asked Rahman to return from Khabok to Popa. By then 4th Guerrilla regiment had been in that area waging guerrilla warfare for over five weeks. Mount Popa and Kyaukpadaung was one pocket of resistance, which had so far defied all British attacks. Under constant raids by INA the British forces were forced to use longer routes that caused the British loss of time, greater consumption of petroleum products and frequent breakdowns of vehicles.

From the beginning of April 1945 the strategic situation began to change rapidly. The enemy launched a three-pronged attack on Mount Popa and Kyaukpadaung area. On 5 April 1945 Rahman was allotted the defence of Kyaukpadaung, south of Popa. In the second week of April there was daily bombing from air. Under the cover of this barrage the British forces advanced in their heavy tanks and armoured vehicles. There were very heavy casualties. The INA could not organise any defence. 2nd Division of the INA was to withdraw to Magwe, 160 km (100 mi) south on Irrawaddy. After completing the task of withdrawing from Magwe, they came to a village called Kanni.

In the meantime, the Burmese army has declared war against Japan, and as such, the villagers did not co-operate with INA. Their retreat was fully under the control of General Aung San's Army under the new name of People's National Army, after having established a parallel government extending their hold over about 50 villages. They crossed Irrawaddy at Kama to reach Prome on 1 May 1945. Most of INA officers and men could not cross the river and they were stranded on the east bank of Irrawaddy. It was apparent by then, that they had lost the war. Rangoon had already been vacated. From Prome they took southeasterly direction to retreat through the jungles of the Pegu Yomas. Eleven days after leaving Prome, they reached at village called Wata about 30 km (20 mi) west of Pegu. There they learnt that Germany had surrendered. Japan was being heavily bombed daily. The British forces had occupied Pegu. Rangoon fell during the last week of April. Herein they decided that the surviving forces of INA should surrender to the British. Officially, Bose died in a plane crash over Taiwan, while flying to Tokyo on 18 August 1945. It is believed that he was en route to the Soviet Union in a Japanese plane when it crashed in Taiwan, burning him fatally. However, his body was never recovered, and many theories have been put forward concerning his possible survival. One such claim is that Bose actually died in Siberia, while in Soviet captivity.

Rahman was the only Indian accompanying Subhas Chandra Bose and thus the only Indian witness at the time of his death in a plane crash in Taihoku on 18 August 1945. Rahman was taken prisoner by Allied forces and at the end repatriated to India. Several committees have been set up by the Government of India to probe into this matter.

=== Surrender of the INA ===
On 17 May 1945 the enemy encircled the Indian National Army. So they surrendered without any surrender ceremony. They were put into prison at Pegu. Shah Nawaz and Dhillon were taken to No. 3 Field Interrogation Centre under command of Major C. Ore on 18 May 1945. Later on 31 May, they were sent to Rangoon Central Jail. On 1945 Rahman was brought to Calcutta by plane and from there, sent to Delhi by train. On 1945 he was put in the Red Fort and interrogated by Mr. Bannerjee of the Central Intelligence Department. The interrogation was over by the third week of July. On the August 1945, Shah Nawaz, Sahgal, Dhillon and Rahman were jointly summoned to the Combined Services Detailed Interrogation Centre for the first time. It was the beginning of the first INA trial at Red Fort. On 17 September 1945 they were served a copy of charge sheet. The main charge was waging war against the King. The news of trial was made public through the press and All India Radio.

=== Trial ===
At the conclusion of the war, the government of British India brought some of the captured INA soldiers to trial on treason charges. The prisoners would potentially face the death penalty, life imprisonment or a fine as punishment if found guilty. After the war, Lt. Col. Shahnawaz Khan, Col. Habib ur Rahman, Col. Prem Sehgal and Col. Gurbaksh Singh Dhillon were put to trial at the Red Fort in Delhi for "waging war against the King Emperor", i.e., the British sovereign. The four defendants were defended by Sir Tej Bahadur Sapru, Jawaharlal Nehru, Bhulabhai Desai and others based on the defence that they should be treated as prisoners of war as they were not paid mercenaries but bonafide soldiers of a legal government, the Provisional Government of Free India, or the Arzi Hukumate Azad Hind, "however misinformed or otherwise they had been in their notion of patriotic duty towards their country" and as such they recognised the free Indian state as their sovereign and not the British sovereign.

The historical trial of Gurbaksh Singh Dhillon, Prem Kumar Sahgal, Shah Nawaz Khan and Habib ur Rahman at the Red Fort began on 5 November 1945 by a General Court Martial for the charge of waging war against the King. When the trial began a mass demonstration was going on outside the Red Fort. People gave voice to their resentment on the trials by shouting:

Lal Qile se aaee awaz,

Sahgal Dhillon Habib Shah Nawaz,
Charoon ki ho umar daraz

(Meaning – Comes the voice from the Red Fort Sahgal, Dhillon, Habib, Shah Nawaz, May the four live long)

New Year's Eve, 31 December 1945, was the last day of trial. The trial marked a significant turning point in India's struggle for Independence and Col. Rahman along with his three colleagues Col. Prem Kumar Sahgal, Col. Dhillon and Maj. Gen. Shah Nawaz Khan became symbol of India fighting for freedom.

The verdict of trial came on 1 January 1946. All four were found guilty of waging war against the King Emperor. Having found the accused guilty of the charge of waging war, the court was bound to sentence the accused either to death or to deportation for life. No finding or sentence by court-martial is complete until confirmed by the Commander-in-Chief, Claude Auchinleck. Auchinleck, taking into consideration the prevailing circumstances, decided to treat all four accused in the same way in the matter of sentence, and decided to remit the sentences of deportation of life against all of the three accused, and they were later released.

The incidence of release the four members of the INA was of momentous significance at national level. The unprecedented publicity in the national papers and the media during the proceedings of trial enhanced the credibility and legitimacy of the freedom struggle launched by Indian National Army. On the following day of the release, 4 January 1946 the whole of Delhi and its neighbourhood had gathered to participate in a rally never organised in the history of Delhi.

=== Enquiry into Bose's death ===
In 1956, the government constituted a committee to look into the circumstances around Subhas Chandra Bose's death. Major General, Shah Nawaz Khan, headed the committee, whose members included Suresh Chandra Bose. The committee began its work in April 1956 and concluded four months later when two members of the committee, Shah Nawaz Khan and S. N. Maitra said that Netaji had indeed died in the air crash at Taihoku (Japanese for Taipei) in Formosa (now Taiwan), on 18 August 1945. They stated that his ashes were kept in Japan's Renkoji Temple and should be reinstated to India. The third member, Suresh Chandra Bose, submitted a separate report of dissent, saying that there was no air crash at all. The Government of India accepted the majority decision.

== First Kashmir War ==
After Independence Muhammad Ali Jinnah was delighted with Rahman joining the government service and advised him in writing to visit and report about the current situation of the state of Jammu and Kashmir in Srinagar. Following this request he went to visit the Prime Minister of Jammu & Kashmir Ram Chandra Kak and Maharaja Hari Singh to better understand their views on the State of Jammu and Kashmir joining Pakistan, as Jammu and Kashmir was a Muslim majority state. In 1947 it was clear that an alternative plan was needed to bring Kashmir under Pakistan's control. Rahman tried his best to organise all of the ex-army people to wrest control of Jammu and Kashmir. Rahman led many battles against the Dogra forces, particularly in Bhimber and Kotli. Under the leadership of Rahman the Muslims of Bhimber rose against the Dogra rulers and separated Bhimber from the state of Jammu & Kashmir.

A GHQ Azad (General Headquarters of Azad Kashmir) was formed in Gujrat, Pakistan, with General Zaman Kiani as the commander-in-chief and Habib ur Rahman as the chief of staff.

== Administrator ==
Following the Indo-Pakistani War of 1947, Rahman joined the Central Superior Services of Pakistan. He worked in several positions such as the Deputy Commissioner of Bannu, Chief Administrator of Northern Areas (Gilgit-Baltistan), Additional Defence Secretary in the Government of Pakistan, and as a member of the Azad Kashmir Council.

== Awards and honours ==
In recognition of his contribution to the "independence movement" the Azad Jammu and Kashmir Government awarded Rahman the following honours:

- Fateh-e-Bhimber (Conqueror of Bhimber).
- Fakhr-e-Kashmir (Pride of Kashmir).
- Ghazi-e-Kashmir (Holy Warrior of Kashmir).

The Degree college of Bhimber is named after him.

Government of Pakistan awarded him the civil and military honours:

- Sitara-e-Pakistan
- Nishan-e-Imtiaz (military),
- Tamgha-e-Imtiaz
- Tamgha-i-Khidmat (military)

== Death ==
Rahman died and was buried on 26 December 1978 in his ancestral village of Panjeri, in Channi Pir Taj Ud Din Graveyard Bhimber, in Pakistan administered Kashmir.

== Bibliography ==
- Bose, Sugata (2011), His Majesty's Opponent, Harvard University Press, ISBN 978-0-674-04754-9
- Effendi, Col. M. Y. (2007), Punjab Cavalry: Evolution, Role, Organisation and Tactical Doctrine 11 Cavalry, Frontier Force, 1849-1971, Karachi: Oxford University Press, ISBN 978-0-19-547203-5
- Defence Media 1991, Inter Services Public Relations, 1991
- Suharwardy, Abdul Haq (1983), Tragedy in Kashmir, Lahore: Wajidalis
- Zaheer, Hasan (1998), The Times and Trial of the Rawalpindi Conspiracy, 1951: The First Coup Attempt in Pakistan, Oxford University Press, ISBN 978-0-19-577892-2
  - Zaheer, Hasan (2007) [1998], The Times and Trial of the Rawalpindi Conspiracy, 1951: The First Coup Attempt in Pakistan, Sang-e-Meel Publishers, ISBN 978-9693519921
