= Indian National Council =

The Indian National Council was an organisation founded in December 1941 in Bangkok by Indian Nationalists residing in Thailand. The organisation was founded from the Thai-Bharat Cultural Lodge on 22 December 1941. The founding president of the council was Swami Satyananda Puri, along with Debnath Das as the founding secretary. Along with the Indian Independence League, it came to be one of the two prominent Indian associations that corresponded with I Fujiwara's F Kikan on the scopes of Japanese assistance to the Indian movement.

However, the Indian National Council emphasised solidarity with the Indian National Congress and, at a time when Japan began her successful Malayan Campaign, the council reflected the Congress leadership's reluctance to appear Quisling of the Japanese. The council also had differences with the Indian Independence League, with Puri openly questioning Tokyo's anti-imperialist credibility in light of her actions in Korea and China. Puri was killed in a plane crash, along with Giani Pritam Singh en route to the Conference in Tokyo in 1942 that saw Rash Behari Bose accepted as the leader of the expatriate Indian movement in South-east Asia. Later, the council sent delegates to attend the Bangkok Conference.
