= 1942 Tokyo Conference =

The Tokyo Conference was a conference held between March 28 and 30, 1942 at Tokyo by South-East Asian Indian Nationalist groups including the Indian Independence League, the Indian National Council, and smaller local Indian associations and clubs. This conference led to the decision to establish an all-unifying Indian Independence League. The conference was held at the invitation of Rash Behari Bose who was instrumental in persuading the Japanese authorities to stand by the Indian nationalists and ultimately to support actively the Indian freedom struggle abroad. Bose was also elected the leader of the Indian movement in South-East Asia during this conference. However, the Tokyo conference failed to reach any definitive decisions due to the differences between various regional factions, and also because of differences both with Rash Behari especially given his long connection with Japan and the current position of Japan as the occupying power in South-east Asia, and also because many were wary of vested Japanese interests. The Tokyo conference however, did agree on the decision to meet again in Bangkok to establish an all-unifying IIL at a future date. Rash Behari arrived in Singapore in April with the returning Indian delegation.

== Notes ==
- Green, L.C. (1948), The Indian National Army Trials. The Modern Law Review, Vol. 11, No. 1. (Jan., 1948), pp. 47-69., London, Blackwell..
- Fay, Peter W. (1993), The Forgotten Army: India's Armed Struggle for Independence, 1942-1945., Ann Arbor, University of Michigan Press., ISBN 0-472-08342-2.
- Bose, Sisir (1975), Netaji and India's Freedom: Proceedings of the International Netaji Seminar., Netaji Research Bureau.
- Corr, Gerald H (1975), The War of the Springing Tiger, Osprey, ISBN 0-85045-069-1.
- Ghosh, K.K (1969), The Indian National Army: Second Front of the Indian Independence Movement., Meerut, Meenakshi Prakashan.
- Kratoska, Paul H (2002), Southeast Asian Minorities in the Wartime Japanese Empire., Routledge., ISBN 0-7007-1488-X.
