= Nakkar Shamali (North) =

Village in Azad Kashmir

Nakkar Shamali (North) نکر شمالی
- Nakkar North
- Location within Azad Kashmir
- Coordinates: 33°02′07″N 73°54′39″E
- Country: Pakistan
- Territory: Azad Kashmir
- District: Bhimber District

Area
  - Total: 0.96 km^{2} (0.37 sq mi)
- Elevation: 290 m (950 ft)

Population (2016)
  - Total: 700
  - Density: 730/km^{2} (1,900/sq mi)
- Time zone: UTC+5 (PST)
- Postal code: 10040
- Calling code: 05827

Nakkar Shamali (North) is a small village in Bhimber District with a population over 700, out of which nearly 80 are living abroad, mostly UK. Literacy rate is above 90%. Over 60 families reside in this village. A majority of the population are Jats. The Government High School Panjeri is few kilometers from this village where people from many nearby villages get their primary and even secondary schooling. For higher studies, people move to the nearby cities, specially Mirpur, Azad Kashmir. Masjid Pir Taj Ud Din is the Jamia Masjid of this village and many other nearby villages.

== Etymology ==
"Nakka" in southern part of Kashmir commonly means a high peak of a small hill or mountain. A village situated on a nakka is known as Gurah Nakka, Gora Nakka or simply Nakkar. Because this place is a high peak of a small hill, it was known as Nakka only. But as the population increased, the place got a shape of a village and with the passage of time derived its name as Nakkar. Another village across the valley towards south of it, at the same height, was also given the name of Nakkar. Until the 1950s, a confusion of "Parli Nakkar" (The Other Nakkar) existed. Either side of the Nakkar used to call other one as Parli Nakkar and it was difficult to understand which Nakkar was being referred to. An educated notable, Chaudhary Fazal Karim (1926–1997) of this village started giving its present recognition as Nakkar Shamali (North) and similarly the other side as Nakkar Janubi (South).

== History ==
The history of the village is traced about 300 years back. In the 1830s, a local notable of the area (originally from a nearby village Kund), Chaudhary Imam Baksh became rebellious against tyranny of a jagirdar in the Sikh rule, became absconder and sneaked away in the mountains of Kus Gopal. In the 1850s after having spent years in jungle, he came back and preferred to get settle in Nakkar. At that time Mochis, Kasaais, Parayis, Telis and Heers used to live in the village. In the 1860s, Bukhari Sayyids migrated from Srinagar and also got settled in the same village. In the 1950s, a family of Darzis migrated from Nowshehra (held Kashmir) and became part of this village and in the 1970s one of the families of Tarkhans from Kund village too settled here. Major (R) Jahangir Ahmed Chaudhary (s/o Chaudhary Fazal Karim), a renowned writer and a notable person in Bhimber Azad Kashmir, is also from this village.
