= Prafulla Kumar Sen =

Indian revolutionary

Prafulla Kumar Sen (died 24 March 1942), also known as Swami Satyananda Puri, was an Indian revolutionary and philosopher.

== Biography ==
Puri, had in his youth taught Oriental philosophy at the University of Calcutta and later at Rabindranath Tagore's Visva-Bharati University at Shantiniketan. Encouraged by Tagore, he arrived in Thailand in 1932, and in 1939, he founded the Thai-Bharat Cultural Lodge, a cultural forum. Arriving in Thailand, Puri was appointed a professor at the Chulalongkorn University, lecturing in ancient Indian and Thai languages, and is said to have mastered the Thai language in six months and went on to translate a number of Indian philosophical works and biographies, including the Ramayana and biographies of Gandhi to Thai. His literary work eventually was more than twenty volumes.

At the onset of World War II in 1939, Puri also came to form the Indian National Council that, along with Giani Pritam Singh's Indian Independence League, was instrumental in stimulating the evolving Japanese interest in supporting armed Indian resistance for the Indian independence movement. Singh and Puri were amongst the first people to negotiate with Fujiwara Iwaichi and the F Kikan regarding Japanese policies in an effort to obtain a commitment about the support of the movement that ultimately saw the foundation of the Indian Independence League and the Indian National Army. Both Puri and Pritam Singh were among the Indian delegates killed in a plane crash en route to the Tokyo conference in March 1942. The Swami Satyananda Puri foundation was established by the Thai-Bharat Cultural Lodge in 1942 in his honour. The SSPF library today is a reference library that houses many old and rare Indian texts. The foundation is also involved in promoting work on Indian culture, especially on the Ramayana.

== Sources ==
- Indian National Army in East Asia. Hindustan Times
- Kratoska, Paul H (2002), Southeast Asian Minorities in the Wartime Japanese Empire, Routledge., ISBN 978-0-7007-1488-9
