= Mohammed Zaman Kiani =

Pakistani military officer and politician

Major General Mohammed Zaman Kiani
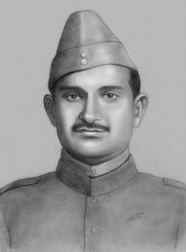
- Kiani in the 1940s

Minister of Information of Pakistan
- President: Muhammad Zia-ul-Haq

Personal details
- Born: 1 October 1910 Village Atyal, Rawalpindi District, British India (Now Islamabad, Pakistan)
- Died: 4 June 1981 (aged 70)
- Education: Indian Military Academy

Military service
- Allegiance: British Raj (1931-1942); Free India (1942-1945); Pakistan (1947-1981)
- Branch/service: British Indian Army; Indian National Army; Pakistan Army
- Rank: Major General
- Battles/wars: World War II; Battle of Malaya; Burma Campaign; Indo-Pakistani War of 1947

Mohammed Zaman Kiani (Urdu: محمد زمان کیانی; c. 1 October 1910 – 4 June 1981) was a Pakistani military officer and politician. He is known for commanding the Kashmir rebels during the first Indo-Pakistani war (1947–1948) against Indian forces, and later serving as Pakistan's information minister under Mohammad Zia-ul-Haq.

During the Second World War, Kiani was an officer in the British Indian Army and was deployed to Malaya to fight the Japanese forces. However, he was captured by the Japanese and taken as prisoner. Consequently, he joined the Indian National Army (INA), an Indian nationalist anti-British paramilitary force led by Subhas Chandra Bose, co-opted by Japan.

Following the partition of India, Kiani opted for Pakistan and joined the Pakistan Army. His contributions to the INA in World War II were later acknowledged and he was posthumously awarded the Netaji Medal by the Indian Government as a result.

== Early life ==
Mohammad Zaman Kiani was born in the village of Atyal, near Bara Kahu in the Rawalpindi District, now part of Islamabad, Pakistan.

A keen hockey player in his youth, Kiani joined the British Indian Army in 1931 at the Indian Military Academy at Dehra Dun. He won the Sword of Honour & Gold Medal for the most outstanding Cadet in 1935 from the Indian Military Academy, and was commissioned in the 1st Battalion 14th Punjab Regiment as a Second Lieutenant.

== Second World War and the Azad Hind ==
In March 1941 the 1st Battalion 14th Punjab Regiment was sent to Malaya and he fought in the Battle of Malaya during World War II and was taken prisoner of war. He later joined the First Indian National Army (INA), when it was formed in 1942 under the command of Mohan Singh. After this army collapsed due to disagreements with the Japanese, the Indian Independence League placed Kiani as Army Commander of the remains, with Jaganath Rao Bhonsle as Director of the Military Bureau.

After the arrival of Subhas Chandra Bose in 1943 and the revival of the Indian National Army (INA), as well as the proclamation of the Free India government, Kiani was appointed the commander of the first division, which he led during the invasion of India in 1944. At the time of the fall of Rangoon, Kiani led the personnel of the Indian National Army and the Azad Hind Government who, along with Bose, marched to Bangkok. After Bose flew to Tokyo in August 1945, Kiani surrendered to the British 5th Division at Singapore on 25 August 1945 as the commander of the INA, along with the rest of his troops. He was repatriated to India and interned until 1946, before being cashiered and discharged from the British Indian Army.

== Poonch Rebellion ==
Following the Partition of India, Kiani returned to Rawalpindi after the independence of Pakistan from British rule in 1947.

In September 1947, the Pakistani prime minister Liaquat Ali Khan and the Punjabi minister Shaukat Hayat Khan put him in charge of the southern wing of the Pakistan's effort to overthrow the Maharaja of Jammu and Kashmir. General Kiani established a General Headquarters, GHQ Azad, based in Gujrat City. From here, Kiani's forces organised raiding operations on Kashmir border and directed the Kashmiri rebels in Poonch, eventually leading to the formation of Azad Kashmir. Brigadier Raja Habib ur Rahman Khan served as his chief of staff and was responsible for the capture of strategic towns and cities such as Bhimber and Mirpur.

== Later life ==
Kiani was later appointed the political agent of the Government of Pakistan at Gilgit. He wrote his memoirs while in retirement in Rawalpindi. They were published after his death:

- Kiani, M. Z. (1994), India's Freedom Struggle and The Great INA - Memoirs of Maj Gen Mohammad Zaman Kiani Foreword by Sisir Kumar Bose., Reliance Publishing House, New Delhi, ISBN 81-85972-04-4

== Sources ==
- Bose, Sugata (2006), A Hundred Horizons: The Indian Ocean in the Age of Global Empire, Harvard University Press, ISBN 978-0-674-02857-9
- Bose, Sugata (2011), His Majesty's Opponent, Harvard University Press, ISBN 978-0-674-04754-9
- Mercado, Stephen C. (2002), The Shadow Warriors of Nakano: A History of the Imperial Japanese Army's elite intelligence school., Brassey's., ISBN 1-57488-538-3
- Nawaz, Shuja (2008), Crossed Swords: Pakistan, Its Army, and the Wars Within, Oxford University Press, ISBN 978-0-19-547660-6
- Saraf, Muhammad Yusuf (2015) [first published 1979 by Ferozsons], Kashmiris Fight for Freedom, Volume 2, Mirpur: National Institute Kashmir Studies – via archive.org
