= Farrer Park Field =

Park in Singapore

Coordinates: 1.3113°N 103.8491°E

Farrer Park Field (known formerly as Farrer Park) is an open field managed by Sport Singapore in Kallang, Singapore. It was the location of Singapore's first race course, Serangoon Road Race Course, as well as where its first-ever aircraft landing took place in 1919. It is a significant location for Singapore's aviation, sporting and political histories.

== Etymology ==
Farrer Park Field was named after Roland John Farrer, former President of the Municipal Commission of Singapore, in 1935.

== History ==
Farrer Park Field used to occupy a much larger area than it does today, stretching as far north as Owen Road. At its greatest extent, the field extended across the present-day planning areas of Kallang and Rochor. The modern field, however, is wholly located within Kallang.

Sport Singapore, which now manages Farrer Park Field, will return the land to the government by mid-2020 for future residential development. Members of the public have voiced concerns over the possible loss of heritage, considering Farrer Park Field is notable for its contribution to Singapore's sporting, political and aviation spheres.

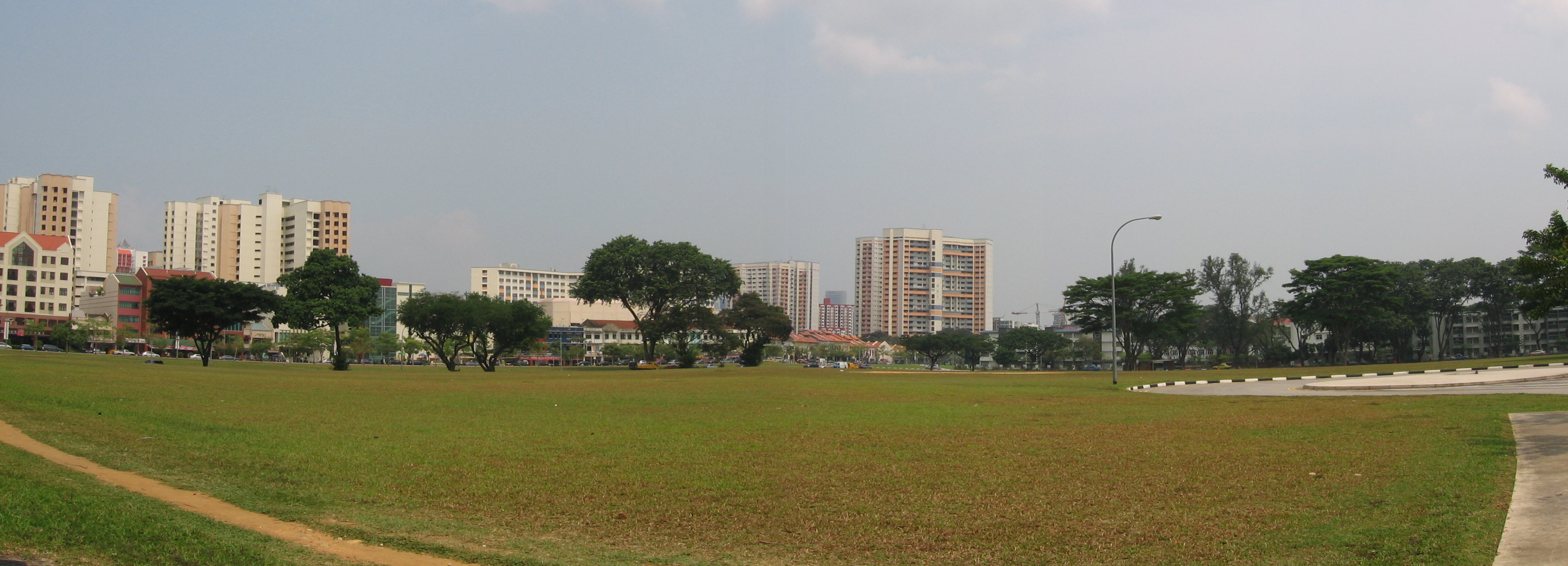
Farrer Park Field is located at 3 Rutland Road, within the planning area of Kallang.

== Use ==
=== Serangoon Road Race Course ===
Serangoon Road Race Course was established in December 1842, making it the first race course in Singapore. Operated by the Singapore Sporting Club and named after the nearby Serangoon Road, horse races were held mostly during the weekends and targeted primarily at the European communities. On non-race days, the race course doubled as a golf course, grazing pasture and rifle range.

On 6 February 1919, a grand fair was held at the Farrer Park Field as part of a series of celebrations for Singapore's centenary. The race course grounds were used as an airstrip.

In 1924, Singapore Sporting Club was renamed Singapore Turf Club. The race course would remain at Farrer Park Field until 1933 when it was superseded by the Bukit Timah Race Course. Farrer Park Field eventually opened for public use, with new developments including playing fields and a building called "Sports House".

Today, Race Course Road and Race Course Lane bear witness to the area's horse racing past. Farrer Park MRT station took its name from this field.

=== Politics ===
Farrer Park Field was the location of numerous political gatherings during Singapore's turbulent pre-war and post-war years. In 1942, following the Japanese takeover of Singapore, soldiers from the British Indian Army were rounded up at Farrer Park Field to urge them to switch allegiance to the Japanese. This event is now known as the Farrer Park address which eventually led to the formation of the Indian National Army in Singapore and Subash Chandra Bose proclaimed a Free India at Cathay Building on 21 October 1943.

In the post-war struggle for independence, many political rallies were held at Farrer Park Field. On 15 August 1955, the People's Action Party (PAP) campaigned for self-governance at Farrer Park Field.

=== Military ===
In February 1966, the 2nd Battalion of the Singapore Infantry Regiment (2 SIR) was based at Farrer Park Field for over six weeks following their return to Singapore from Sabah during the period of Konfrantasi. The original barracks of 2 SIR was then occupied by the 5th Battalion Royal Malay Regiment (5 RMR).

=== Sports ===
The park was associated with Football in Singapore and was nicknamed the "cradle" and "spiritual home" of football in Singapore. Many national footballers and Malaysia Cup-winning teams started their football career in the park.

It was also the home stadium for the Farrer Park United football club.

== See also ==
- Padang, Singapore, historic place for the events of national importance in Singapore
- NS Square, newer place for the events of national importance in Singapore
