= Desh Sevak Party =

- Dissolved: October 1949
- Merged into: All India Forward Bloc

The Desh Sevak Party was a political party in India. It was led by veteran leaders of the Indian National Army, General Mohan Singh and Col. Gurbaksh Singh Dhillon. In October 1949 it merged with the All India Forward Bloc. Singh became the Forward Bloc chairman of AIFB and Dhillon the general secretary.
