= Roland John Farrer =

British colonial administrator (1873–1956)

Roland John Farrer CMG
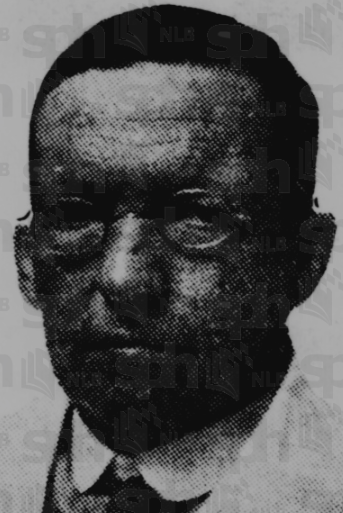
- Farrer from a 1934 publication
- Born: 1873; London
- Died: 24 July 1956 (aged 84); Saint John's Island, Singapore
- Burial place: Bidadari Cemetery
- Education: Eton College; Balliol College, Oxford
- Occupation: Colonial administrator

Roland John Farrer (1873 – 24 July 1956) was a British colonial administrator who served as President of the Municipal Commission of Singapore from 1919 to 1931.

== Early life and education ==
Farrer was born in 1873 in London, the son of Frederick Willis Farrer. He was educated at Eton College and Balliol College, Oxford.

== Career ==
Farrer joined the Straits Settlements civil service as a cadet in 1896. From 1897 to 1907, he served in Province Wellesley, except for the period 1901–02 when he served in the Singapore Secretariat. From 1908 to 1911, he served in the Land Office in Singapore, and from 1911 to 1915, served as Municipal Assessor. In 1915, he was transferred to Kelantan where he served as acting British Adviser until 1919.

In 1919, Farrer returned to Singapore where he served as President of the Municipal Commissioners, remaining in office until 1931. In 1928, due to his valuable services, his term was extended by special request for a further three years.

During his 12 years as Municipal President, he played a leading role in the civic life and progress of Singapore in the post-War period, overseeing its almost complete transformation. Major public works carried out during his administration included the construction of the Municipal Building; the St James's Power Station; Gunung Pulai Public Water Works; the Fort Canning Reservoir; rebuilding and expansion of the sewerage system, and many new roads and bridges including Elgin Bridge. Trams were replaced by trolley-buses which reduced noise and the cost of upkeep of the roads. His term as president also saw Municipal revenue increase from $3 million to $16 million, and an increase in personnel in municipal services. He was succeeded by William Bartley on his retirement in 1931.

== Personal life and death ==
Farrer died on 24 July 1956 at the home of his son on Saint John's Island, Singapore, aged 84, and was buried at Bidadari Cemetery.

== Honours and legacy ==
Farrer was appointed Companion of the Order of St Michael and St George (CMG) in the 1930 New Year Honours.

Farrer Park and Farrer Road in Singapore were named after him.
