= Farrer Park =

- Subzone of Rochor Planning Area

Name transcription(s)
  - Chinese: 花拉公园
  - Pinyin: Huālā gōngyuán
  - Malay: Taman Farrer
  - Tamil: ஃபேரர் பார்க்
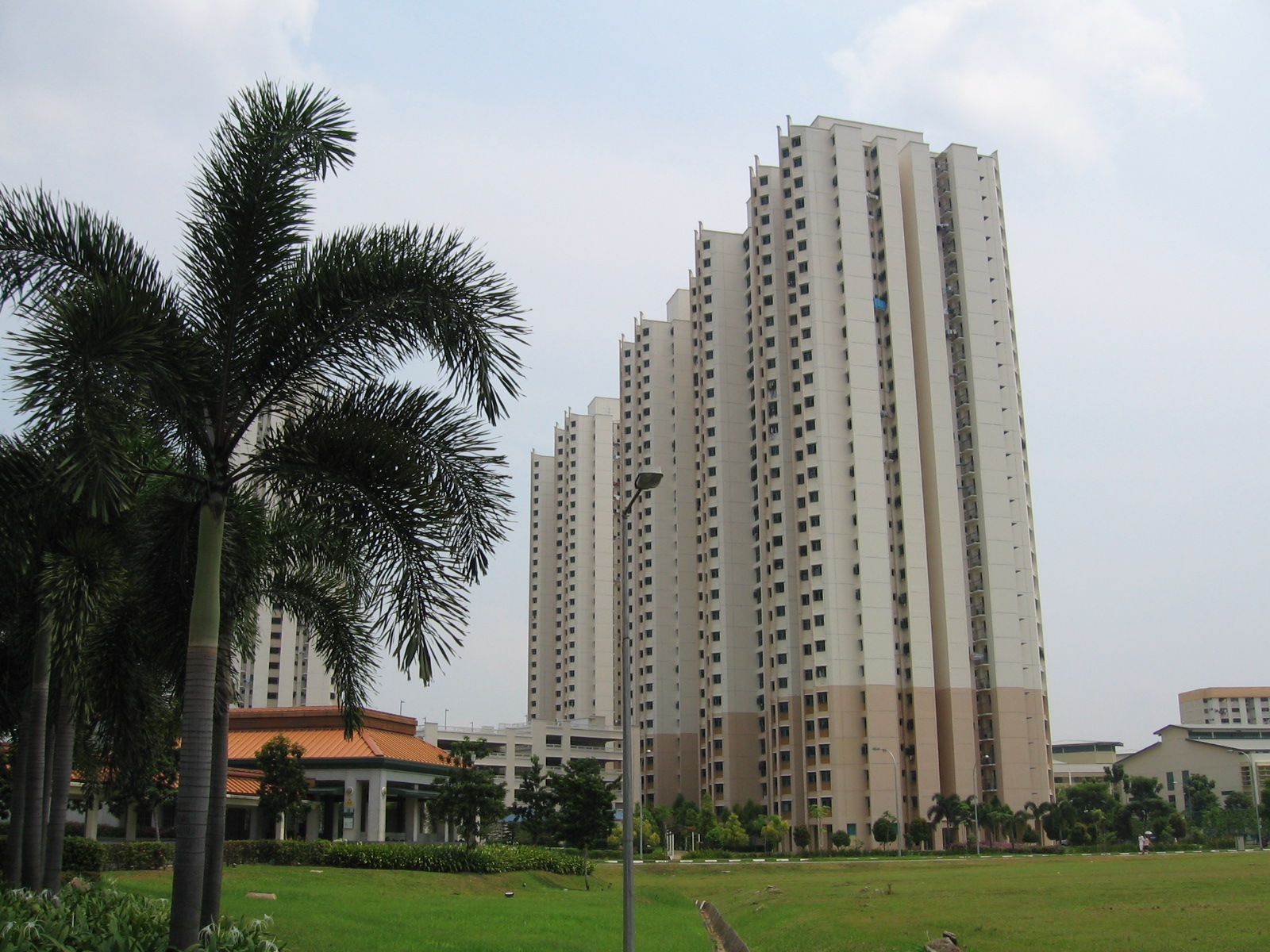
- Farrer Park in 2006
- Interactive map of Farrer Park
- Coordinates: 1.309°N 103.853°E
- Country: Singapore

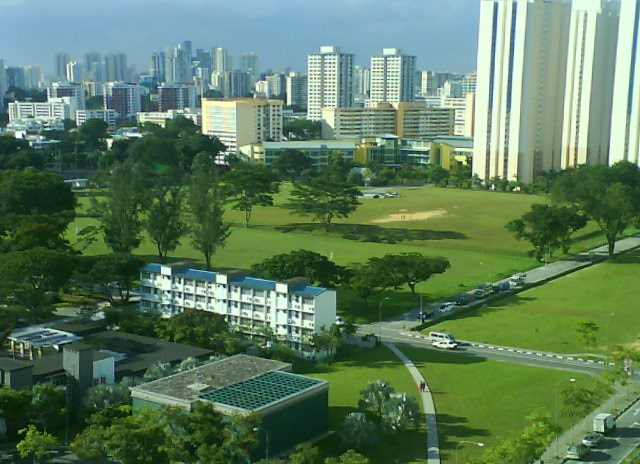
Farrer Park field and the surrounding buildings (clockwise starting from the top): Farrer Park Secondary School, Farrer Park Estate and LTA office.

Farrer Park (IPA: /ˈfærər/) is a subzone of the Rochor planning area in the Central Region of Singapore, as defined by the Urban Redevelopment Authority bounded by Serangoon Road, Rangoon Road, Race Course Road, Northumberland Road, Tekka Lane and Bukit Timah Road.

The name "Farrer Park" historically referred to an open field situated to the west of this subzone, now commonly known as Farrer Park Field, located within Kallang planning area.

== Etymology ==
Farrer Park and Farrer Road were named after R. J. Farrer (died 1956), who was Municipal Assessor and later President of the Municipal Commissioners in the 1920s. In 1952, there was an unsuccessful attempt to change the name of Farrer Road in order to avoid confusion with Farrer Park, situated in a different location.

== See also ==
- Little India, Singapore
- Rochor
- Farrer Park MRT station
- Piccadilly Grand
