= Panjeri =

Village in Azad Kashmir, Pakistan

Panjeri پنجیڑی
- Village
- Panjeri
- Location in Pakistan
- Coordinates: = 33.0243°N 73.9154°E
- Pakistan: Pakistan
- Region: Azad Kashmir
- Bhimber: Bhimber District
- Elevation: 430 m (1,410 ft)

Population
  - Total: 18,000
- Time zone: UTC+5 (PKT)
- Area code: 10400

Panjeri (Urdu: پنجیڑی)(Punjabi: پنجیڑی /ਪੰਜੇੜੀ) is a village in Bhimber District of Azad Kashmir, Pakistan, with a population of about 18,000 people. It is halfway between Bhimber and Mirpur. It has a union council of 39 sub-villages.
