= Mohan Singh (military officer) =

Indian military officer and politician

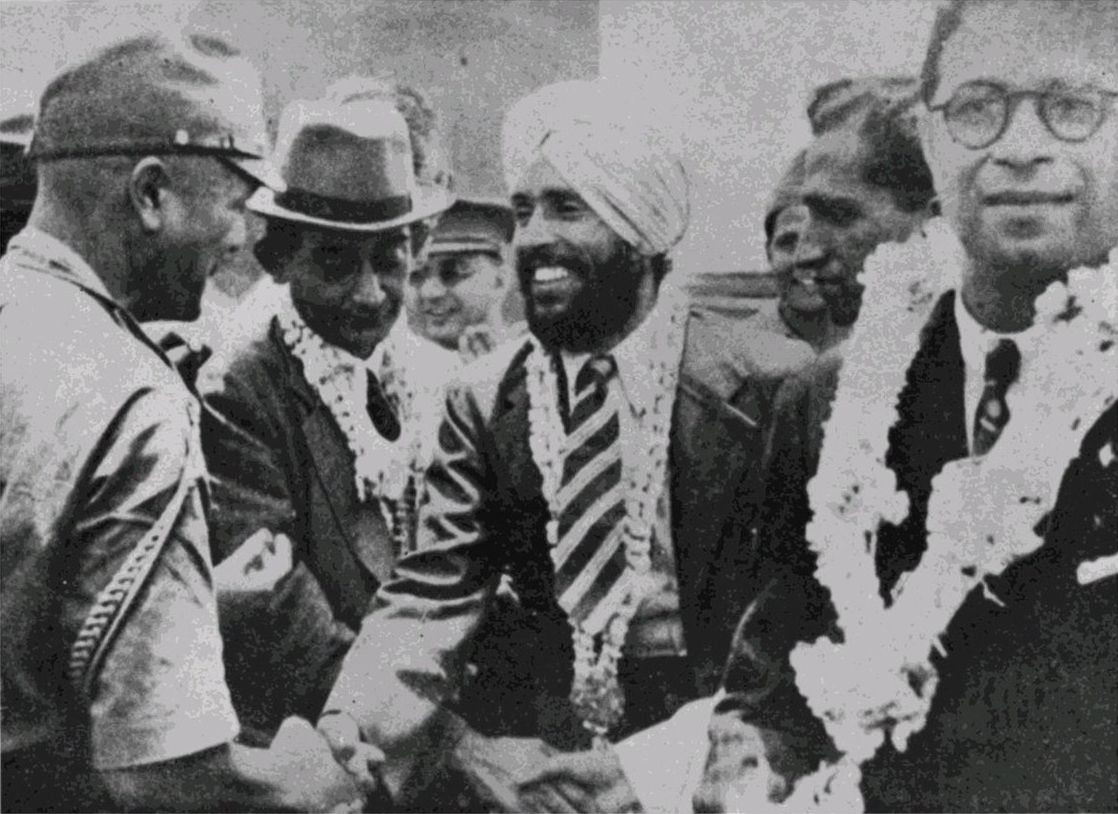
- Singh (in turban) being greeted by the Japanese Major Fujiwara Iwaichi, April 1942

Founder of First Indian National Army
- In office September 1942 – December 1942
- Preceded by: Position established
- Succeeded by: Subhash Chandra Bose

Personal details
- Born: Mohan Singh Ghumman; 3 January 1909 Ugoke, Sialkot, Punjab, British India
- Died: 26 December 1989 (aged 80) Jugiana, Ludhiana, Punjab, India
- Parents: Tara Singh (father); Hukam Kaur (mother)
- Known for: Indian independence movement

Military service
- Rank: General

General Mohan Singh Ghuman was an Indian military officer and politician. Mohan Singh was the founder and leader of the Indian National Army in South East Asia during World War II.

== Early life ==
Mohan Singh was born in a Ghumman Jat Sikh family, the only son of Tara Singh and Hukam Kaur, a couple from Ugoke village, near Sialkot (now in Pakistan). His father died two months before his birth, and his mother moved to her parents' home in Badiana in the same district, where Mohan Singh was born and brought up.

== Military career ==
Mohan Singh passed secondary school and enlisted in the 14th Punjab Regiment of the British Indian Army in 1927. After the completion of his recruit training at Hrozpur, he was posted to the 2nd Battalion of the Regiment, then serving in the North-West Frontier Province. He was selected as a potential officer in 1931, and after six months' training in Kitchener College, Nowgong (Madhya Pradesh), and another two and a half years in the Indian Military Academy, Dehradun, he received his commission 1 February 1935, and was posted for a year to a British Army unit, the 2nd battalion Border Regiment. He was then posted to 1st Battalion, 14th Punjab Regiment on 24 February 1936, which at that time happened to be stationed at Jhelum.

Mohan Singh had been promoted temporary Captain when his battalion was earmarked for operational service in the Far East. The battalion was still carrying out intensive training at Secunderabad in December 1940 when he married Jasvant Kaur, the sister of a fellow officer. He left for Malaya with his unit on 4 March 1941.

== Second World War ==
Japan entered the War with her surprise attack on the American Naval base at Pearl Harbor, Hawaii, on 7 December 1941 and overran Southeast Asia within a few weeks. The Japanese Imperial General Headquarters in October set up the Fujiwara Kikan, or the F-kikan, in Bangkok, headed by Major Fujiwara Iwaichi, chief of intelligence of the 15th army. Tasked with intelligence gathering and contacting the Indian independence movement, the overseas Chinese, and the Malayan Sultan with the aim of encouraging friendship and cooperation with Japan, Fujiwara's staff included five commissioned officers and two Hindi-speaking interpreters. His initial contact was with Giani Pritam Singh. Pritam Singh was a leader of such an organisation. He and Major Fujihara, a Japanese officer, requested Mohan Singh to form an Indian Army comprising captured Indian soldiers. Mohan Singh hesitated, but ultimately agreed. Fujihara handed over about 40,000 Indian soldiers, who had surrendered to him, to Mohan Singh. This was the initial step towards the formation of the first Indian National Army (INA).

=== Action in Malaya ===
The British force in the northern part of the Malaya Peninsula, including Mohan Singh's battalion, 1/14 Punjab Regiment, was fleeing towards the South. Mohan Singh's own forces had been outgunned and destroyed by Japanese forces at Jitra. Captured by Japanese troops after several days in the jungle, Singh was taken to Alor Star to Fujiwara and Pritam Singh at a joint office of the F-Kikan and the IIL. Fujiwara, later self-described as "Lawrence of the Indian National Army" (after Lawrence of Arabia) is said to have been a man committed to the values which his office was supposed to convey to the expatriate nationalist leaders, and found acceptance among them.

=== Indian National Army ===
Mohan Singh was the main founder of the Indian National Army. Although Pritam Singh was involved to a large extent, it was Fujiwara who, with his sincerity of purpose and belief, convinced Mohan Singh to betray his oath to the British Crown by uniting with the Japanese mission for the greater motive of Indian independence. This included the promise that he would be treated as an ally and a friend, and not a prisoner of war. For public related or political matters, Singh always looked towards Subhash Chandra Bose. Bose was considered the Man of Destiny, in which they, Singh, was willing to shed their blood and also let the Japanese attain leadership and support. Singh initially helped Fujiwara take control of the situation of looting and arson that had developed in Alor Star; in December 1941, after meeting with the Japanese commanding general, Singh was convinced of its feasibility of raising an armed Indian unit. Between himself, Pritam Singh and Fujiwara, Mohan Singh set about contacting Indians in the British Indian Army in Southeast Asia and also began recruiting from among those captured by the Japanese in Malaya. All Indian prisoners of war and stragglers were placed under his charge, and he was asked to restore order in the town of Alor Star. From there, he began to conduct what was known as "patriotic education" to raise the army. Thus the nucleus of what came to be the Ajad Hind Fauj also known as Indian National Army was born. Kuala Lumpur fell on 11 January 1942 with 3,500 Indian prisoners of war, and Singapore on 15 February with 85,000 British troops, of whom 45,000 were Indians. Mohan Singh asked for volunteers who would form the Ajad Hind Fauj (literally translates to Free India Army) to fight for Indian independence from the British rule. For him, the army was to be only formed by Indians, and intended only for use by India.

A large number of men came forward to join what came to be termed as the Ajad Hind Fauj (National Army of independent India). The new set-up came into being on 1 September 1942 by which time the strength of volunteers had reached 40,000. Mohan Singh, now their general, was to command it. During a conference on 15–23 June 1942, the Indian Independence League was created under the leadership of Rash Behari Bose, an Indian revolutionary who had escaped to Japan in June 1915. Through one of the 35 resolutions passed by the conference, Mohan Singh was appointed commander-in-chief of the "Army of Liberation for India," i.e. the Indian National Army.

=== Disagreements with Japan ===
Though Mohan Singh had kept a good relationship with the members of Fujiwara Kikan, he was soon disenchanted with the headquarters of the Japanese Army and doubted their intentions based on their orders. It appeared that they wanted to use the Indian National Army only as a part of the Japanese army and were deliberately withholding recognition and public proclamation about its existence as an independent army. Some supreme commanders of the Japanese army had disagreements with him. On 29 December 1942, Mohan Singh was removed from his command and taken into custody by the Japanese military police.

It was only after the arrival of another Indian leader of great political standing, Subhas Chandra Bose, from Germany to the Far-Eastern front in June 1943 that the Indian National Army was revived in the form of Azad Hind Fauj. However, Mohan Singh could not be reinstated to the revived army.

Upon Japan's defeat, Mohan Singh was taken into custody by the British and repatriated to India to face trials. However, due to public pressure, roused by the INA Red Fort trials, Mohan Singh was only cashiered from the Army. He subsequently served in the Indian Parliament as a member of the Rajya Sabha (Upper House).

== Partition of India ==
=== Desh Sewak Sena ===
He had to leave his hearth and home in what then became Pakistan and came to India a homeless refugee. He was allotted some land in the village of Jugiana, near Ludhiana, where he settled permanently.

During the Partition of Punjab, on 21 October 1947, at Majithia House, Amritsar, he had established the Desh Sewak Sena (D.S.S.) to help protect and escort Muslim caravans out of India and help Sikh and Hindu refugees into India. It was originally founded in May 1946. All Sikh jathas had gathered at Sultanwind to propose a common plan for the future of the Sikh community, to which Mohan Singh had a more far-sighted plan than Kartar Singh Jhabbar and Master Tara Singh. The Sena's top brass consisted of all former Indian National Army soldiers like himself (the Senapati), Col. Naranjan Singh Gill, Capt. Rattan Singh, Col. G.S. Dhillon and others included Capt. Surat Singh, Col. Jagir Singh, Bishan Singh, Col. Sri Ram, Col. Fauja Singh and many more. Their war cries were "Desh Sewak Sena, Sada Jeev", "Hamara Desh, Sada Jeev" and "Desh Shastru Nash Karenge." Gurdial Singh Dhillon established a newspaper known as "Hamara Desh" in December 1947. The volunteer uniforms included a Grey shirt, pajamas and turbans of a similar colour and the soldiers was a Mazri shirt with a turban of the same colour. Their army consisted of an overwhelming majority of Sikhs, but Hindus were also permitted into the force. A women's wing (Istri Sena) and youth wing (Bal Sena) were also formed. By December 1947 the riots had died down to a small ebb, but the organization took a new turn.

Originally the Indian Government took the D.S.S. as a beneficial force, Mahatma Gandhi, C. Rajagopalachari, Jawaharlal Nehru and Sardar Patel all gave their blessings and the brigadier based in Amritsar at the time, Brig. Mohindar Singh Chopra, had provided the organization with aid, ammunition and helped them train youth and women in the countryside. By earning the trust of the Indian Government his force was not disbanded and continued.

In January 1948 Sardar Patel had made a speech which offended many Sikhs commenting about the turban and the beard; at this instance Mohan Singh took to arms. He made Bombay and Jodhpur as his secondary bases where Anti-India speeches were made targeting Sardar Patel. Capt. Bhag Singh (ex-I.N.A.) had commanded twenty of his troops to take over Kangra Fort in the Kangra Incident of May 1948, he was shot dead by police near the fort as well as his associates. The East Punjab Government during Partition gave him large amounts of land in Hissar, Rohtak and Gurgaon for the D.S.S.'s operation, which he used as bases against the government. His main plans were to create a secular dictatorship in Punjab which came through the form of the Desh Sewak Movement, which played a dubious role in Operation Polo.

== Political career ==
Following Indian independence, Mohan Singh later served in public life as a Member of Parliament in the Rajya Sabha (Upper House) of the Indian Parliament. Though the D.S.S. was abolished in 1948, he created the Desh Sewak Party as the successor- it was socialist and authoritarian in nature- though noted to be a personality cult of Mohan Singh. His following increased during the Kotwal Murder Case, it was a case wherein a Kotwal (high ranking-police officer) had raped an innocent Muslim girl who was going to be married in ten days in Malerkotla. Mohan Singh had arrived as soon as he heard of the case and gathered a frenzied mob of his Sikh followers who beat the Kotwal to death on public display. He was christened as a new savior of the Punjab, and his fame and stature outmatched that of even Master Tara Singh. Directly after the incident he had to make a speech at Rataul on the founding anniversary of the Desh Sewak Sena so he had left. In Malerkotla a reign of police terror ensued, 80 citizens of Malerkotla were arrested and many beaten up and injured. Mohan Singh called Socialist Tilak Raj Bhasin to fight cases to free the citizens and free all of them.

The Desh Sewak Movement died down after Mohan Singh declared involvement in the Punjab elections. His followers, the swathes of military-minded youth, wished for Punjab to be soaked in bloodied revolution which Mohan Singh could not support. The Desh Sewak Party had merged with the All India Forward Bloc in 1950. Chairman of All-India Forward Bloc till its merger with Indian National Congress in 1950. From 1956, he became a member of Punjab CC and its executive and election committees, AICC. He was treasurer of the Punjab Congress since 1966.

During the 1962 Sino-Indian War, Mohan Singh raised a rural volunteer force called the Punjab Raksha Dal for further reinforcement and manpower, and with the help of the Punjab Government enlisted an American firm towards the construction of an air suspension factory in Punjab. General Mohan Singh was the first leader of this force which was supported by the Shiromani Akali Dal's Sikhs (at that time headed by Maharaja Yadavindra Singh) and the Indian National Congress' Sikhs (headed by Partap Singh Kairon). They were to create jathas with thousands of Sikhs willing the enlist, with training on the lines of 1947's jathas, to send to Aksai Chin to fight against China (they already had 200,000 willing Sikh recruits). Although the Arya Samajist lobby would decry these efforts as a "consolidation of Sikh strength" and a steps towards a power seizure, and under such characterizations Kairon was told by the central government to merge the Punjab Raksha Dal with the Home Guard; factory plans were cancelled.

He was elected a member of the Punjab Legislative Assembly in 1967. He was a member of the Rajya Sabha for six years and was re-elected to the Rajya Sabha in April 1972.

In and out of Parliament he strove for the recognition of the members of his Azad Hind Fauj as "freedom fighters" in the cause of the nation's independence.

== Literary Works ==
- Congress Unmasked
- Mahapurbi Punjab
- Leaves from my Diary
- Soldiers Contribution to Indian Independence

== Death ==
Mohan Singh died at Jugiana on 26 December 1989 due to cancer.

== Bibliography ==
- "Mohan Singh, General, Soldiers Contribution to Indian Independence Delhi, 1974"
- Lebra, Joyce C. (1977), Japanese trained armies in South-East Asia, New York, Columbia University Press, ISBN 0-231-03995-6.
- Fay, Peter W. (1993), The Forgotten Army: India's Armed Struggle for Independence, 1942-1945., Ann Arbor, University of Michigan Press., ISBN 0-472-08342-2.
