= Thai-Bharat Cultural Lodge =

Emblem of the Thai-Bharat Cultural Lodge

The Thai-Bharat Cultural Lodge (Thai: อาศรมวัฒนธรรมไทย-ภารต) is one of the most prestigious Indian cultural organisation in Thailand that seeks to promote comparative studies and exchange between Thai and Indian history and culture. It was founded in 1940 in Bangkok by Swami Satyananda Puri with encouragement from the Indian Nobel Laureate Rabindranath Tagore. The Swami Satyananda Puri foundation was established by the Thai-Bharat Cultural Lodge in 1942. Today, the SSPF library is a reference library that houses many old and rare Indian texts. The foundation is also involved in promoting work on Indian culture, especially on the Ramayana.

Today, the TBCL promotes Indian cultural affairs in Thailand and supports Thai and Indian students, studying both in Thailand as well as for studies in India. The Indian government also provides assistance to the Cultural lodge for promoting Indian languages and culture.
