= F Kikan =

Fujiwara Kikan
- 藤原機関
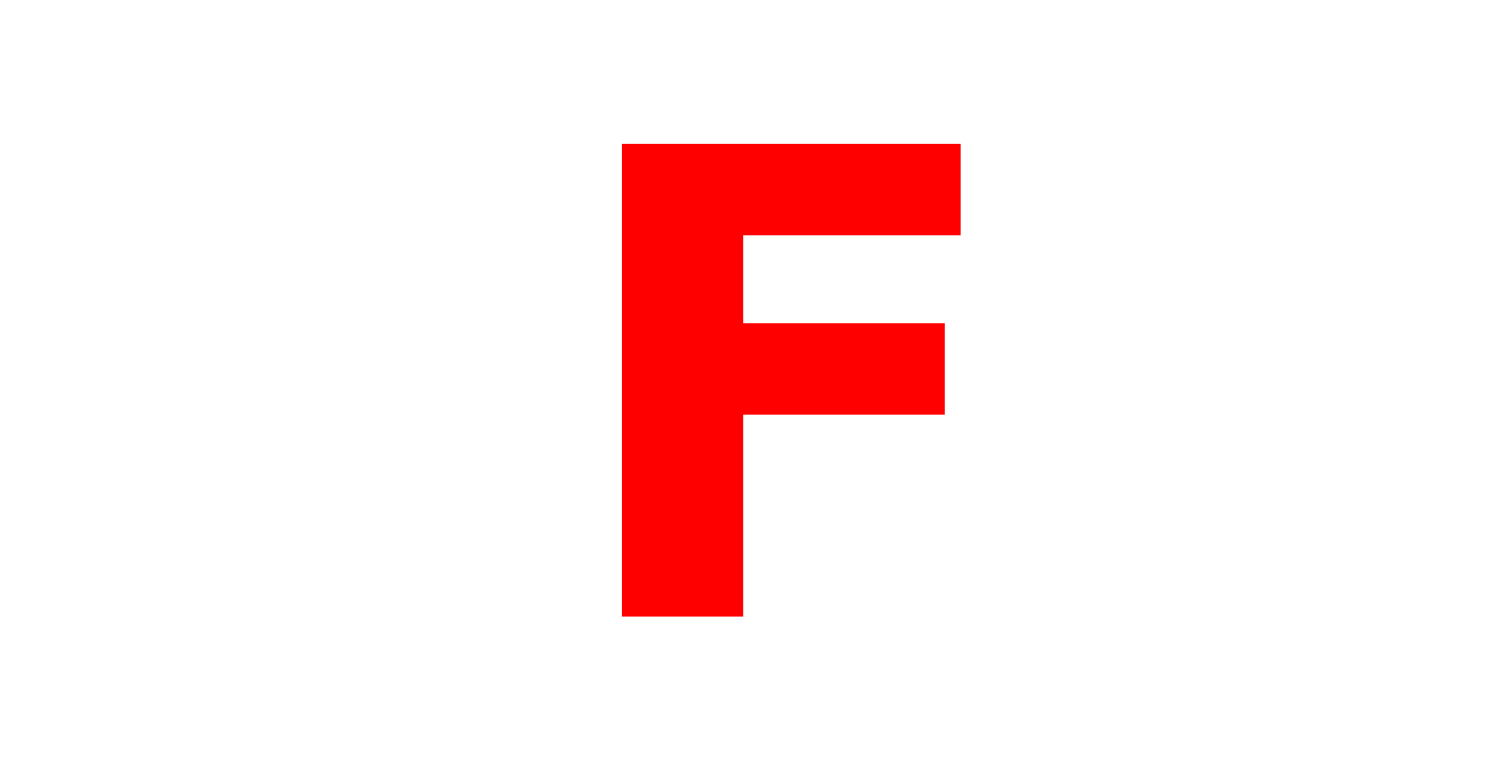
- F-Kikan logo found on officers' armbands
- Active: 1941–1942
- Disbanded: 16 February 1942
- Country: Empire of Japan
- Branch: Imperial Japanese Army
- Type: Military intelligence Command
- Role: Clandestine operation Counterinsurgency; Counterintelligence; Covert operation Espionage; Force protection HUMINT; Intelligence assessment Internal security Interrogation; Jungle warfare Law enforcement PSYWAR; Public security Raiding; Reconnaissance; Tracking
- Part of: Imperial General Headquarters
- Motto(s): 究極の誠意 ("ultimate sincereness")

Commanders
- Notable commanders: Major Iwaichi Fujiwara

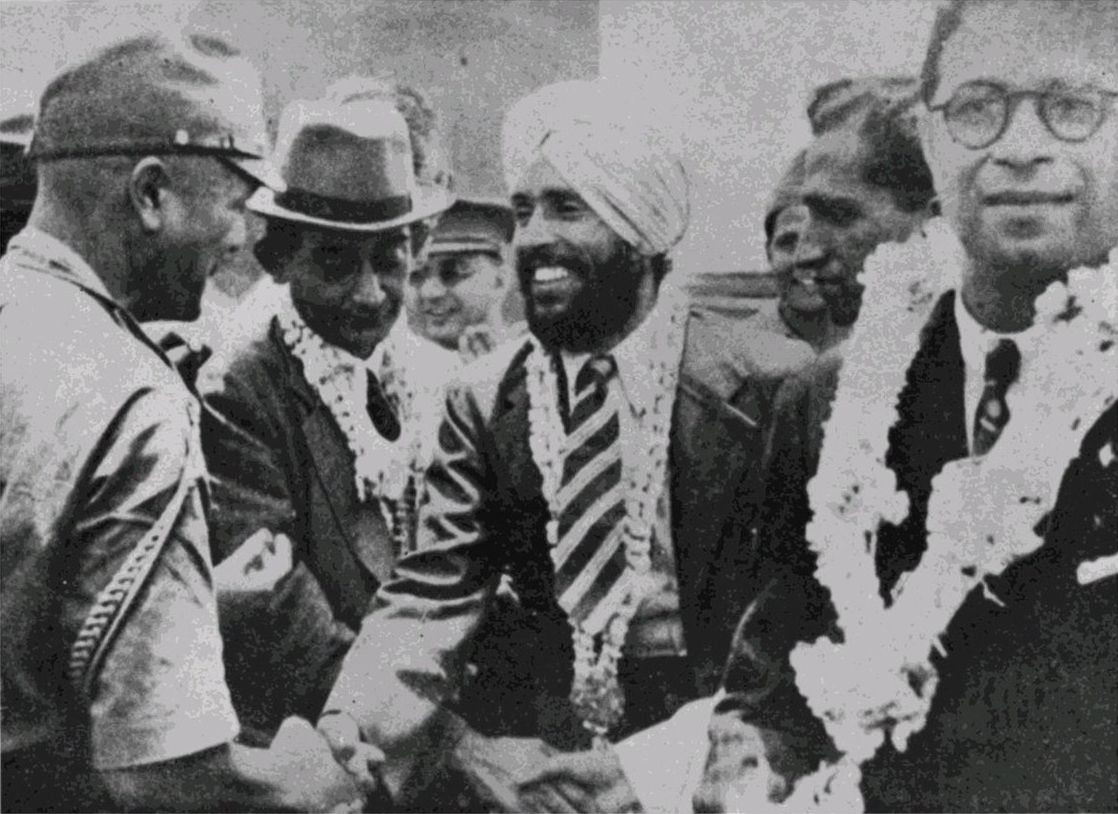
Major Fujiwara greets Captain Singh of the Indian National Army, April 1942

Fujiwara kikan (藤原機関, Fujiwara or Efu (F) Kikan) was a military intelligence operation established by the IGHQ in September 1941. The Unit was transferred to Bangkok at the end of that month and headed by Major Fujiwara Iwaichi, chief of intelligence of the 15th army. Its task was to contact the Indian independence movement, the overseas Chinese and the Malayan Sultans with the aim of encouraging friendship and cooperation with Japan. The unit was notable for its success in establishing cooperative ties between the Empire of Japan and the Indian independence movement, overseas Chinese and various Malay sultans.

== History and development ==
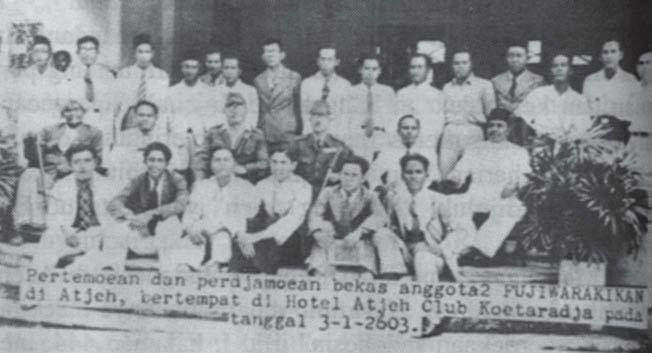
Former F-Kikan Aceh members pose with their Japanese leader, Masabuchi, 3 January 1943. Many of them later became civil servants in the Japanese occupation government in Indonesia.

Based on experiences in China, the Imperial Japanese Army established a semi-autonomous unit to carry out liaison duties with local independence movements in Southeast Asia and transmit intelligence gathered from these movements back to the army command. Two such units were established before the outbreak of World War II in South-East Asia: the Minami Kikan and the F Kikan.

The F-Kikan was named after its leader, Major Fujiwara Iwaichi, chief of intelligence of the Japanese 15th Army, initially stationed in Bangkok in late 1941. Fujiwara's staff included five commissioned officers and two Hindi-speaking interpreters. Fujiwara's motto was that the intelligence activity for Imperial Japanese Army is "ultimate sincereness".

After the attack on Pearl Harbor, the 15th Army was tasked with the invasion of Malaya, during which time F-Kikan rescued Sultan Abdul Hamid Halim of Kedah and his family. His son (and future Malaysian Prime Minister) Tunku Abdul Rahman made a radio announcement urging the Malay people to cooperate with Japan. F-Kikan also attempted to mobilize the anti-British Kesatuan Melayu Muda, but since most of its leadership had been arrested by the British authorities shortly after the start of the war, its impact was minor.

The F-Kikan was also instrumental in establishing relations with Indonesian resistance movements against Dutch colonial rule, especially in Aceh in northern Sumatra which formed a backdrop to the Japanese occupation of the Dutch East Indies. The F-Kikan movement also had massive amounts of resources in West Sumatra, strongly established within the province prior to the Invasion of Sumatra in large numbers as migrants, later also recruiting local recruits. The agency managed to create a pro-Japanese sentiment within West Sumatra and infamously tracked down Sukarno's hiding place in Padang.

However, F-Kikan's greatest success was in its contacts with Indian independence leader Giani Pritam Singh Dhillon and Captain Mohan Singh, and recruitment of some 40,000 Indian prisoners of war into what eventually became the Indian National Army. This development was a tremendous coup for the Japanese government, and was a direct threat to the British position in India.

After the British surrender of Singapore in 1942, F-Kikan was dissolved, and replaced by a new liaison agency, the Iwakuro Kikan, or "I-Kikan", to coordinate activities between the Indian National Army and the Japanese army.

== See also ==
- Japanese migration to Malaysia
- Japanese occupation of West Sumatra ‒ F-Kikan played a significant role in establishing the occupation in Sumatra
- Kempeitai
