= Giani Pritam Singh Dhillon =

Indian freedom fighter (died 1942)

Giani Pritam Singh Dhillon was an Indian freedom fighter and Sikh missionary who, as a member of the Ghadar Party, was instrumental in the planning of the failed 1915 Ghadar conspiracy in the British Indian Army. Giani Pritam Singh Dhillon was a close friend of Gurbaksh Singh Dhillon, famous Sikh Indian independence movement leader and prominent member of the Indian National Army. He was also close associate of Subhas Chandra Bose. Pritam Singh is also remembered for reviving the same idea during World War II by seeking Japanese support in the establishment of what came to be the Indian National Army. Pritam Singh died in a plane crash in 1942.

== See also ==
- Indian Independence League
- Indian National Army in Singapore
- Mohan Singh (general), INA
- Japanese occupation of Malaya
