= Indian Independence League =

Political organization

The Indian Independence League (also known as IIL) was a political organisation operated from the 1920s to the 1940s to organise those living outside British India into seeking the removal of British colonial rule over the region. Founded by Indian nationalists, its activities were conducted in various parts of Southeast Asia. It included Indian expatriates, and later, Indian nationalists in-exile under Japanese occupation following Japan's successful Malayan Campaign during the first part of the Second World War. During the Japanese Occupation of Malaya, the Japanese encouraged Indians in Malaya to join the League.

Established primarily to foster Indian nationalism and to obtain Japanese support for the Indian Independence Movement, the League came to interact and command the first Indian National Army under Mohan Singh before it was dissolved. Rash Behari Bose handed over the INA to Subhas Chandra Bose. Later, after the arrival of Subhas Chandra Bose in South East Asia and the revival of the INA, the League came under his leadership, before giving way to Azad Hind.

== Background ==
With the occupation of South-East Asia, a large expatriate Indian population had come under the Japanese occupation. A framework of local Indian associations had existed even before the war reached Malaya. The biggest of these included the likes of the pre-war Central Indian Association, the Singapore Indian Independence league and other organisations, and had amongst their members eminent Indian expatriates, e.g. K. P. K. Menon, Nedyam Raghavan, Pritam Singh, S.C. Goho and others. With the occupation authority's encouragement, these groups began amalgamating into the local Indian Independence leagues and became the predominant liaising organisation between the local Indian population and the Japanese occupation force.

Joining the Indian Independence League brought security and perks. Displaying an IIL card smoothed the purchase of a railway ticket and allowed purchase at the IIL headquarters of hard-to-get items like tooth paste and soap at reasonable prices. It was also the means by which rations were issued. In addition, since the IIL was allowed to work with the Swiss Red Cross, members could receive and send letters to then hard to reach places, such as Ceylon.

== Rash Behari Bose ==
Rash Behari Bose was an Indian revolutionary noted for his planning of the Delhi-Lahore conspiracy of 1912 to assassinate the then Viceroy Lord Hardinge, and his involvement in the Ghadr Conspiracy of 1915. Sought by the Raj, Rash Behari fled to Japan where he found sanctuary among Japanese patriotic societies. Rash Behari subsequently learned the Japanese Language, married a Japanese woman, and became a naturalised Japanese citizen.

Before and during the Malayan Campaign, Rash Behari had tried to interest Japanese efforts to aims of the Indian Independence movement. With encouraging reports from Fujiwara and the establishment of the local Independence leagues, the IGHQ sought Rash Behari's help to expand and amalgamate the Indian movement taking shape.

Rash Behari advised the IGHQ to attach the evolving INA to a political organisation that would also speak for the civilian Indian population in South-east Asia.

== The Tokyo Conference ==
In March 1942, he invited the local leaders of the Indian Independence leagues to a conference in Tokyo. This invitation was taken up and the delegation met at a Tokyo hotel in late March 1942.

The Tokyo conference, however, failed to reach any definitive decisions. A number of the Indian delegation held differences with Rash Behari, especially given his long connection with Japan and the current position of Japan as the occupying power in South-east Asia, and were wary of vested Japanese interests. The conference agreed to meet again in Bangkok at a future date. The Indian delegation returned to Singapore in April with Rash Behari.

== All Malayan Indian Independence League ==
In Singapore, Rash Behari was invited to chair a public meeting that saw the proclamation of the All-Malayan Indian Independence League. The League was headed by Nedyam Raghavan, a Penang Barrister and a prominent Malayan Indian. The governing board included K.P. Kesava Menon and S.C Goho, the latter the chairman of the Singapore Indian Independence League. The league made a number of proposals including creation of a Council of Action as the executive arm, formation of a body which the regional leagues would report to, as well as the relations between the INA and the council as well as those between the council and the Japanese authority. The decision was made to vote on these proposals by a representation larger than that had met at Tokyo, and meeting elsewhere than on Japanese soil. There also remains suggestions that members of the League, including Niranjan Singh Gill who directed the PoW camps, were apprehensive about Japanese intentions with regards to the league, and the Independence movement.

The league found widespread support among the Indian population; membership was estimated to be close to a hundred-thousand at the end of August. Membership in the league was of advantage for the population in the middle of war-time emergency and when dealing with the occupation authorities. The League's membership card identified the holder as Indian (and thus an ally), it was used to issue rations. Further, the League took efforts to improve the conditions of the local Indian populace, including the cause of the now jobless plantation labourers.

== Bangkok Conference ==
In June 1942, the Bangkok conference was held. This saw the constitution of the Indian Independence League. The league consisted of a Council for Action and a Committee of representatives below it. Below the committee was to be the territorial and local branches. Rash Behari Bose was to chair the council, while K.P. Kesava Menon, Nedyam Raghavan were among the civilian members of the council. Mohan Singh and an officer by the name of Gilani were to be the INA's members. The committee of representatives took members from the 12 territories with Indian population, with representation proportional to the representative Indian population. The Bangkok resolution further decided that the Indian National Army was to be subordinate to it.

The Bangkok conference adopted a thirty-four point resolution to and expected the Japanese government to respond to each point. These included the demand that the Japanese government clearly, explicitly and publicly recognise India as an independent nation and the league as the nation's representatives and guardians. Other points also demanded assurances of Japanese respect for her sovereignty and her territorial integrity, to all of which the council unanimously demanded that Japan clearly and unequivocally commit themselves before the league proceeded any further in collaboration. The resolution further demanded that the Indian National Army be accorded the status of an allied army and be treated as such, and that all Indian POWs be released to the INA. The Japanese must help the army with loans, and not to ask it to march in any other purpose than for the liberation of India. The resolution was duly forwarded to what was then the Japanese liaising office, the Iwakuro Kikan.

== Greater East Asia Conference ==
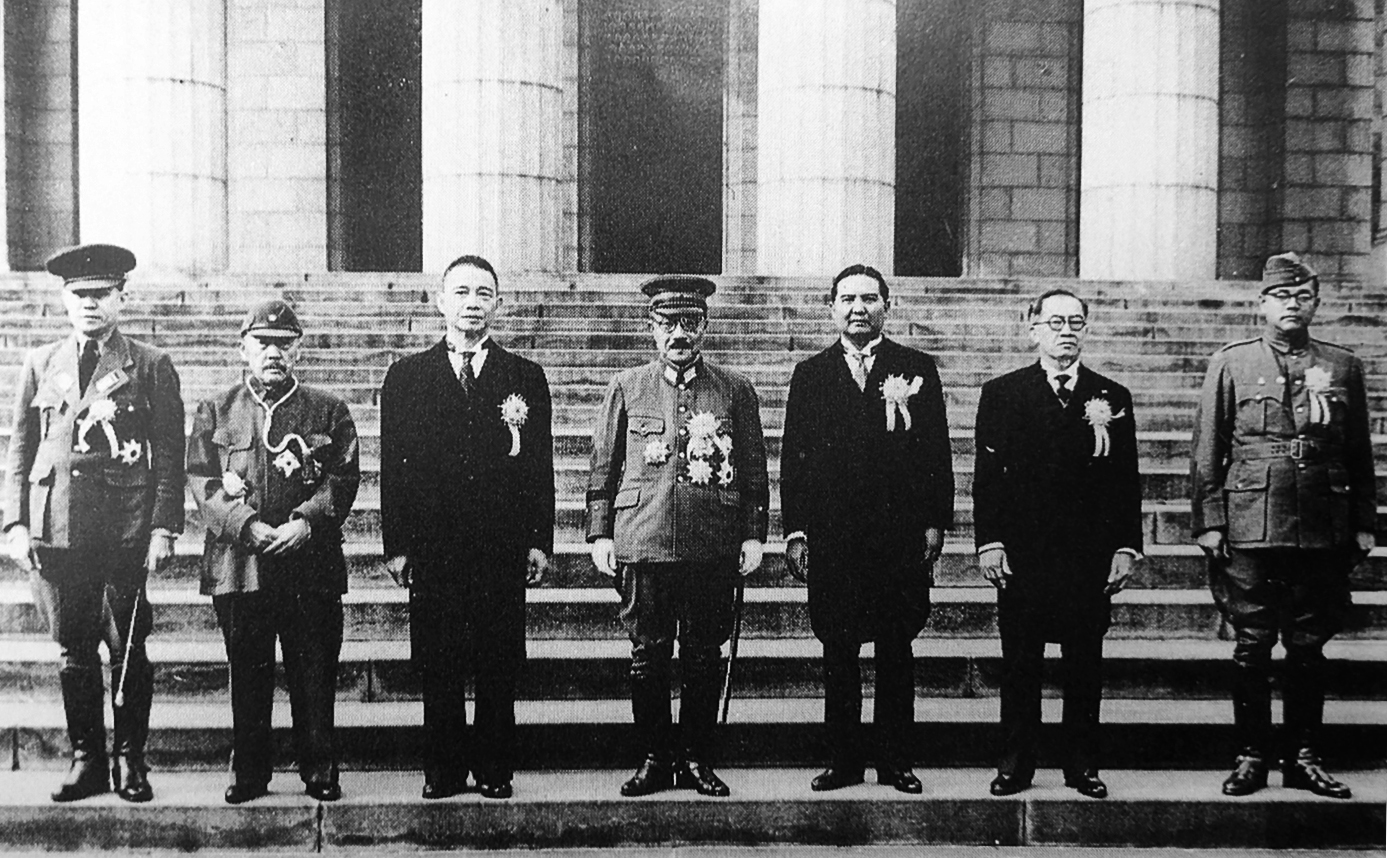
Participants of the Greater East Asia Conference

In November 1943, the Greater East Asia Conference was held in Tokyo. The head of state who were the member of the Greater East Asia Co-Prosperity Sphere was gathered. Subhas Chandra Bose participated as a Head of State of Provisional Government of Azad Hind.

== Later in time ==
In 1945, noted Jakarta's Indian community leader Pritam Singh took part in both the Indian Independence League and also Indonesia's struggle for independence.

In 1972, the Centre introduced the Swathantra Sainik Samman Pension Scheme through which independence activists were entitled to a pension. However, there was significant resistance to implementing the scheme. For example, it took 24 years of legal fighting for S. M. Shanmugam to finally receive his pension in August 2006.

== Popular culture ==
Indian Independence League received a prominent role in film maker K. A. Devarajan's 1998 film "Gopuram." In the film, the maternal grandfather of an Indian journalist is a 1930s independence activist in Japan who is wanted by the Imperial Police. Eventually, the grandfather joins the Indian Independence League in Japan and his exploits are presented.

In Amitav Ghosh's novel The Glass Palace (2000), Ghosh chronicles the fictional Rangoon teak trade fortunes of Rajkumar Raha and his extended family. In that book, Uma Dey is a widow and Indian Independence League activist. Her appearance in the later half of the book is used as a device to characterize the post-colonial divisions for the remainder of the novel.
