= Iwaichi Fujiwara =

IJA and JGSDF officer (1908–1986)

- 藤原 岩市
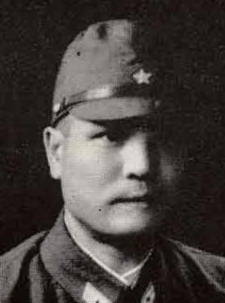
- Born: March 1, 1908; Taka District, Hyōgo, Japan
- Died: February 24, 1986 (aged 77); Musashino, Tokyo, Japan
- Education: Imperial Japanese Army Academy; Army Staff College
- Military career
- Allegiance: Japan
- Branch: Imperial Japanese Army; Japan Ground Self-Defense Force
- Service years: 1931–1945 (IJA); 1954–1964 (JGSDF)
- Rank: Lieutenant colonel (IJA); Lieutenant general (JGSDF)
- Units: 37th Infantry Regiment, 21st Army, Imperial Japanese Army General Staff, Southern Expeditionary Army Group, 15th Army, 2nd Army, 57th Army
- Commands: F Kikan; Home Defense Force; 1st Division
- Conflicts: Second Sino-Japanese War; World War II; Dutch East Indies campaign; Burma campaign; Operation U-Go
- Other work: Author

Iwaichi Fujiwara (藤原 岩市, Fujiwara Iwaichi; March 1, 1908 − February 24, 1986) was a lieutenant colonel in the Imperial Japanese Army during World War II, and later a lieutenant general in the post-war Japan Ground Self Defense Force.

== Biography ==
A native of Hyōgo Prefecture, Fujiwara graduated from the 43rd class of the Imperial Japanese Army Academy in 1931 and was assigned to the IJA 37th Infantry Regiment. After serving a tour of duty in Tianjin, China, he returned to the Army Staff College and graduated from the 50th class in 1938, whereupon he was assigned to the IJA 21st Army.

In 1939, Fujiwara was transferred to the military intelligence unit within the Imperial Japanese Army General Staff, tasked with planning operations in south and Southeast Asia. He traveled to Bangkok in 1941, and joined the Japanese Southern Expeditionary Army Group as Chief of Staff the same year. In 1941, Fujiwara established the F Kikan, a Japanese special operations unit tasked with developing and assisting independence movements in British India, Malaya and the Dutch East Indies. In 1943, Fujiwara and his unit were transferred to the IJA 15th Army. F-Kikan greatly assisted in the establishment of the Indian National Army.

Knowing of the long struggle of the Dutch to subdue Aceh province in northern Sumatra, and the ongoing resistance of the Acehnese period against Dutch rule, Fujiwara was ordered to make contact with the Aceh independence movements preparatory to the Japanese invasion of the Dutch East Indies. One of his first contacts was Sahid Abu Bakar, a religious teacher who lived in Kedah, who assisted him in recruiting a small organization to gather military intelligence, secure supplies, spread pro-Japanese propaganda, and hinder Dutch efforts to sabotage local infrastructure. He also made contact with PUSA, the Islamic nationalist organization in Aceh, to start an armed rebellion. On the night of 11 March 1942, F-Kikan operatives and PUSA irregulars captured the Aceh capital of Banda Aceh. Thus, when the Japanese Imperial Guard Division landed the following morning, the city was already in Japanese hands.

Fujiwara subsequently served as Intelligence Officer on the staff of the Fifteenth Army in Burma. He reconnoitered much of the northern part of the country in preparation for Operation U-Go, the offensive into British India. Following its failure, nearly the entire staff of the Fifteenth Army was transferred, although Fujiwara was the last to be reassigned, in December 1944.

After his recall to Japan, Fujiwara taught at the Army Staff College for a year, and was then transferred back to the field as Chief of Staff of the IJA 2nd Army in April 1945 and IJA 57th Army in June 1945. He was based in Singapore at the end of the war.

Fujiwara was one of the few officers of the Imperial Japanese Army to make the transition to the postwar Japan Ground Self-Defense Force, commanding the Home Defense Force in 1955, and the 1st District Corps in Tokyo (predecessor of 1st Division) in 1956, before his retirement as lieutenant general in 1964.

Later in life, Fujiwara authored the book F. Kikan: Japanese Army Intelligence Operations in Southeast Asia during World War II, in which he described himself as the "Lawrence of Arabia of Southeast Asia".

== In popular culture ==
In the Amazon Prime Video Original Series The Forgotten Army - Azaadi Ke Liye, Iwaichi Fujiwara is portrayed by a London-based Japanese actor Junichi Kajioka. In the Malaysian 2000 film Leftenan Adnan Fujiwara is portrayed by Farid Amirul.
