= Raag Desh (film) =

- Directed by: Tigmanshu Dhulia
- Written by: Pramod Singh; Tigmanshu Dhulia
- Screenplay by: Tigmanshu Dhulia
- Produced by: Rajya Sabha TV - A public sector entity
- Starring: Kunal Kapoor; Amit Sadh; Hikaru Ito; Vijay Varma; Mrudula Murali
- Cinematography: Rishi Punjabi
- Edited by: Geeta Singh
- Music by: Songs; Rana Mazumder; Siddharth Pandit; Background Score; Dharma Vish
- Production company: Rajya Sabha TV
- Distributed by: UFO Moviez
- Release date: 28 July 2017
- Running time: 137 minutes
- Country: India
- Language: Hindi
- Box office: ₹33 lakh (US$34,000)

Raag Desh (transl. Love the country) is a 2017 Indian historical action drama film directed by Tigmanshu Dhulia and produced by Gurdeep Singh Sappal and Rajya Sabha TV. The film is based on Indian National Army trials, the joint court martial of Indian National Army officers Colonel Prem Sahgal, Colonel Gurbaksh Singh Dhillon, and Major Shah Nawaz Khan on charges of treason against the British Empire during World War 2. The leading roles in Raag Desh have been played by Kunal Kapoor, Amit Sadh, Mohit Marwah and Mrudula Murali. The film was released on 28 July 2017. Rishi Punjabi is the cinematographer of the film.

== Premises ==
A period film based on the historic 1945 Indian National Army Red Fort Trials.

== Cast ==
- Kunal Kapoor as Shah Nawaz Khan
- Amit Sadh as Gurbaksh Singh Dhillon
- Hikaru Ito as Japanese Army officer
- Vijay Varma as Jamal Kidwai
- Keneth Desai as Bhulabhai Desai
- Kenny Basumatary as Netaji Subhas Chandra Bose
- Mrudula Murali as Captain Laxmi Sahgal
- Alexx O'Nell as Col. P. Walsh
- Zakir Hussain as Lt. Nag
- Kanwaljit Singh as Prem's Father
- Rajesh Khera as Jawahar Lal Nehru
- Deepraj Rana as Afzal Khan
- Amrita Rai as Col. Dhillon's Mother
- Kuldip Sareen as Col. Dhillon's Father
- Vishwas Kini as Mohan Singh
- Anil Rastogi as Kailash Nath Katju

== Soundtrack ==
Raag Desh

Soundtrack album by Rana Mazumder, Ram Singh Thakuri & Siddharth Pandit
- Released: 13 July 2017
- Genre: Feature film soundtrack
- Length: 16:51
- Language: Hindi
- Label: T-Series
External audio
- Audio Jukebox on YouTube

The soundtrack of Raag Desh consists of four songs composed by Rana Mazumder, Ram Singh Thakuri & Siddharth Pandit.

Tracklist
No.	Title	Lyrics	Music	Singer(s)	Length
1.	"Hawaon Mein Woh Aag Hai"	Sandeep Nath & Pt. Vanshidhar Shukla	Rana Mazumder & Ram Singh Thakuri	Shreya Ghoshal & K.K.	04:04
2.	"Tujhe Namaami Ho"	Sandeep Nath	Rana Mazumder	Shreya Ghoshal, Sunidhi Chauhan, K.K. & Rana Mazumder	04:17
3.	"Ghar Chaado" (Bengali)	Rana Mazumder	Rana Mazumder	Shreya Ghoshal & Rana Mazumder	04:04
4.	"Teri Zameen"	Revant Shergill	Siddharth Pandit	Shriya Pareek & Revant Shergill	04:26
Total length:					16:51

== Critical reception ==
Rohit Vats of Hindustan Times gave the film a rating of 3.5 out of 5, saying that the movie is, "A heavy dose of patriotism that is totally worth your time." Nihit Bhave of The Times of India gave the film a rating of 3 out of 5 and said that, "Had the screenplay been freed of its half-hearted side-tracks, it would have made for great infotainment. The movie is only half of that word now." Kunal Guha of Mumbai Mirror gave the film a rating of 2.5 out of 5 saying that, "Tigmanshu Dhulia's historical drama has a compelling story but is fleshed out half-heartedly". Shubhra Gupta of The Indian Express gave the film a rating of 2 out of 5 and said that, "Raag Desh has lofty ambition, but the stagey treatment lets it down. The war scenes are plentiful but you can't help seeing the clunkiness." Saibal Chatterjee of NDTV gave the film a rating of 3 out of 5 saying that Raag Desh "is a riveting, if not exactly exhilarating, epic tale that presents a prudent blend of war, patriotic fervour, expert legal sleights and good old human drama."

Rohit Bhatnagar of Deccan Chronicle gave the film a rating of 2 out of 5 and said that, "On the whole, Raag Desh is an average film with an untold factual story. The film could have been a much better plus in the era of commercial films, Raag Desh is a niche in its own genre." Kennith Rosario of The Hindu commented on the film that, "It is rather disappointing to see a film that ticks all the right boxes, fall apart because of the lack of a captivating narrative." Nandini Ramnath of Scroll praised the film, saying that, "Despite numerous rousing speeches for freedom, the movie never slides into chest-thumping jingoism, and at 137 minutes, provides an absorbing account of a fascinating and underexplored chapter of the freedom struggle." Sameeksha of News18 gave the film a rating of 2.5 out of 5 and said that, "Tigmanshu Dhulia brings forth a forgotten chapter of 1945 Red Fort trials and makes it into a history class rather than an engaging watch."
