= INA Defence Committee =

Committee established by the Indian National Congress in 1945

The INA Defence Committee, later the INA Defence and Relief Committee, was a committee established by the Indian National Congress in 1945 to defend those officers of the Indian National Army who were to be charged during the INA trials. Additional responsibilities of the committee also came to be the co-ordination of information on INA troops held captive, as well as arranging for relief for troops after the war. The committee declared the formation of the Congress' defence team for the INA and included famous lawyers of the time, including Bhulabhai Desai, Asaf Ali, Jawaharlal Nehru and as The British insisted that this was an Army Court Martial, Lt. Col Horilal Varma Bar at law and Prime minister of the state of Rampur was selected to head the defense Committee.

== See also ==
- Indian National Army
- INA trials, the courts-martial of INA officers at Delhi that began in late 1945.
- Maj Shah Nawaz Khan, Gurbaksh Singh Dhillon and Col. Prem Kumar Sahgal defendants in the first INA trial.
- Captain Lakshmi Sahgal, who commanded the Rani of Jhansi Regiment, and was also the minister in Charge of Women's affairs in the Azad Hind Govt.
- Indian National Congress
