= History of the Indian National Congress =

The present flag of the party

The flag was adopted in 1931 and used by the Provisional Government of Free India during the Second World War

Mahatma Gandhi with Congress activists during the Salt March

The Indian National Congress was established when 72 representatives from all over the country met at Bombay in 1885. Prominent delegates included Dadabhai Naoroji, Surendranath Banerjee, Badruddin Tyabji, Pherozeshah Mehta, W. C. Banerjee, S. Ramaswami Mudaliar, S. Subramania Iyer, and Romesh Chunder Dutt. The Englishman Allan Octavian Hume, a former British civil servant, was one of the founding members of the Indian National Congress.

== Formation and early days (1885–1905) ==
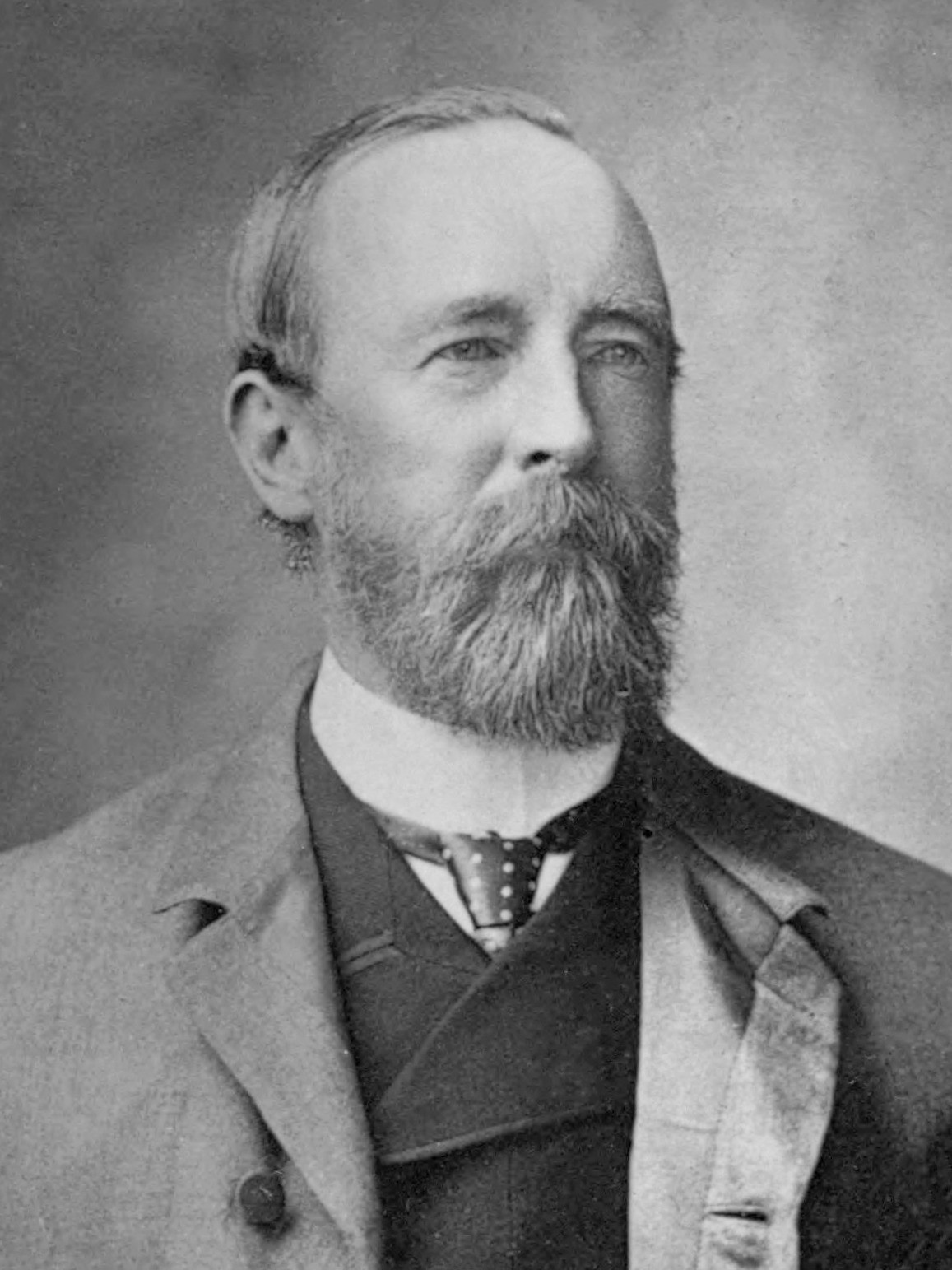
Allan Octavian Hume

Retired British Indian Civil Service (ICS) officer Allan Octavian Hume founded the Indian National Congress in order to form a platform for civil and political dialogue among educated Indians. After the Indian Rebellion of 1857, control of India was transferred from the East India Company to the British Empire. British-controlled India, known as the British Raj, or just the Raj, worked to try to support and justify its governance of India with the aid of English-educated Indians, who tended to be more familiar with and friendly to British culture and political thinking. Ironically, a few of the reasons that the Congress grew and survived, particularly in the 19th century era of undisputed British dominance or hegemony, was through the patronage of British authorities and the rising class of Indians and Anglo-Indians educated in the English language-based British tradition.

Hume embarked on an endeavor to get an organization started. He began by reaching-out to selected alumni of the University of Calcutta. In an 1883 letter, he wrote that,

Every nation secures precisely as good a Government as it merits. If you the picked men, the most highly educated of the nation, cannot, scorning personal ease and selfish objects, make a resolute struggle to secure greater freedom for yourselves and your country, a more impartial administration, a larger share in the management of your own affairs, then we, your friends, are wrong and our adversaries right, then are Lord Ripon's noble aspirations for your good fruitless and visionary, then, at present at any rate all hopes of progress are at an end[,] and India truly neither desires nor deserves any better Government than she enjoys.

In May 1885, Hume secured the viceroy's approval to create an "Indian National Union", which would be affiliated with the government and act as a platform to voice Indian public opinion. Hume and a group of educated Indians came together on 12 October and published "An Appeal from the People of India to the Electors of Great Britain and Ireland" which asked British voters in the 1885 British general election to support candidates sympathetic to the positions of Indians. These included opposition to taxation of India to finance British campaigns in Afghanistan, and support for legislative reform in India. The appeal however, was a failure, and was interpreted by many Indians as "a rude shock, but a true realization that they had to fight their battles alone."

On 28 December 1885, the Indian National Congress was founded at Gokuldas Tejpal Sanskrit College in Bombay, with 72 delegates in attendance. Hume assumed office as the General Secretary, and Womesh Chunder Bonnerjee of Calcutta was elected president. Besides Hume, two additional British members (both Scottish civil servants) were members of the founding group, William Wedderburn and Justice (later, Sir) John Jardine. The other members were mostly Hindus from the Bombay and Madras Presidencies.

Policies of Indian National Congress during 1885–1905

Between 1885 and 1905, the Indian National Congress passed several resolutions in its annual sessions. Through the resolutions, the humble demands made by Congress included civil rights, administrative, constitutional and economic policies. A look at the resolution passed on these methods would be given an idea the directions of Congress programs were taking.

a) Civil Rights: The Congress leaders realized the value of freedom of speech and press, the right to organize processions, meetings and similar other rights.

b) Administrative: The Congress leaders urged the government to remove certain administrative abuses and run public welfare measures. They put emphasis on the appointment of Indians in the government services. Specific proposals are made to open agricultural banks for the relief of peasantry. The Congress leaders also raised the voice of protest against the discriminatory laws enacted by the government.

c) Constitutional: The humble demand made by the early Congress leaders in respect to constitutional matters were: to increase the power of legislative councils; to include elected Indian representatives. It must be mentioned here that the British government of India paid scant regard to the above demands made by Congress.

d) Economic: In the economic sphere, Congress blamed the economic policies of the British government that resulted in rising property prices and other economic issues which affected the Indian people. The Congress also put forward certain specific suggestions for the economic improvement of the country and her people. These included the introduction of modern industry, Indianization of public services, etc. The Congress also demanded the abolition of salt tax for the benefit particularly of the poor section of the people

=== Economic policy ===
The INC's economic policies include:

- Resetting economic policies to reiterate the advantages of an open market economy
- Supporting wealth creation
- Reducing inequality between the rich, the middle classes, and the poor
- Accelerating growth driven by the private and viable public sector enterprises

=== Foreign policy ===
Even before independence of India, the Indian National Congress had well articulated foreign policy positions. In the words of Rejaul Karim Laskar, a scholar of Indian foreign policy and an ideologue of Indian National Congress, "Right after the establishment of the Indian National Congress, it started articulating its views on foreign affairs. In its first session in 1885, the Indian National Congress deplored the annexation of upper Burma by British Indian Government ."

=== Muslim response ===
Many Muslim community leaders, like the prominent educationalist Syed Ahmed Khan, viewed the Congress negatively, owing to its membership being dominated by Hindus. Hindu community and religious leaders were also averse, seeing the Congress as supportive of European cultural invasion.

The ordinary people of India were not informed of or concerned about its existence on the whole, for Congress never attempted to address the issues of poverty, lack of health care, social oppression, and the prejudiced negligence of the people's concerns by the British government. The perception of bodies like the Congress was that of an elitist, then educated and wealthy people's institution.

=== Rise of Indian nationalism ===
First session of Indian National Congress, Bombay, 28–31, December, 1885

The first spurts of nationalistic sentiment that rose amongst Congress members were when the desire to be represented in the bodies of government, to have a say, a vote in the lawmaking and issues of administration of India. Congressmen saw themselves as loyalists, but wanted an active role in governing their own country, albeit as part of the Empire.

This was personified by Dadabhai Naoroji, considered by many as the eldest Indian statesman. Naoroji went as far as contesting, successfully, an election to the British House of Commons, becoming its first Indian member. That he was aided in his campaign by young, aspiring Indian student activists like Muhammad Ali Jinnah, describes where the imagination of the new Indian generation lay.

Bal Gangadhar Tilak was among the first Indian nationalists to embrace swaraj as the destiny of the nation. Tilak deeply opposed the British colonial education system in India which he thought ignored and defamed India's culture, history, and values, defying and disgracing the Indian culture. He resented the denial of freedom of expression for nationalists and the lack of any voice or role for ordinary Indians in the affairs of their nation. For these reasons, he considered swaraj as the natural and only solution: the abandonment of all things British, which would protect the Indian economy from economic exploitation and gradually lead to eventual Indian independence. He was backed by rising public leaders like Bipin Chandra Pal and Lala Lajpat Rai, Aurobindo Ghose, V. O. Chidambaram Pillai who held the same point of view. Under them, India's four great states —Madras, Bombay, Bengal, and Punjab region shaped the demand of the people and India's nationalism.

The moderates, led by Gopal Krishna Gokhale, Pherozeshah Mehta, and Dadabhai Naoroji, held firm to calls for negotiations and political dialogue. Gokhale criticized Tilak for encouraging acts of violence and disorder. The Congress of 1906 did not have public membership, and thus Tilak and his supporters were forced to leave the party.

With Tilak's arrest, all hopes for an Indian offensive were stalled. The Congress lost credit with the people. Muslims formed the All India Muslim League in 1906, considering the Congress as completely unsuitable for Indian Muslims.

== World War I: The Battle for the Soul ==
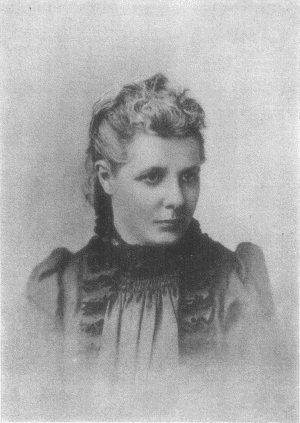
Annie Besant was by far the most prominently involved European in the Indian struggle.

When the British entered the British Indian Army into World War I, it provoked the first definitive, nationwide political debate of its kind in India. Voices calling for political independence grew in number.

The divided Congress re-united in the pivotal Lucknow session in 1916, with the efforts of Bal Gangadhar Tilak and Muhammad Ali Jinnah. Tilak had considerably moderated his views and now favoured political dialogue with the British. He, along with the young Muhammad Ali Jinnah and Mrs. Annie Besant launched the Home Rule Movement to put forth Indian demands for Home Rule —Indian participation in the affairs of their own country —a precursor to Swaraj. The All India Home Rule League was formed to demand dominion status within the Empire.

But another Indian man with another way was destined to lead the Congress and the Indian struggle. Mohandas Gandhi was a lawyer who had successfully led the struggle of Indians in South Africa against South African discriminatory laws. Returning to India in 1915, Gandhi looked to Indian culture and history, the values and lifestyle of its people to empower a new revolution, with the concept of non-violence, civil disobedience, he coined a term, Satyagraha.

=== Champaran and Kheda ===
Mohandas Karamchand Gandhi, who later on became more popular as Mahatma Gandhi, had success in defeating the British in Champaran and Kheda, giving India its first victory in the struggle for freedom. Then Indian National Congress had supported that movement; Indians gained confidence in the working of that organization that the British could be thwarted through that organization, and millions of young people from across the country flooded into Congress membership.

=== Battle for the Soul ===
A whole class of political leaders disagreed with Gandhi. Bipin Chandra Pal, Muhammad Ali Jinnah, Annie Besant, Bal Gangadhar Tilak all criticized the idea of civil disobedience. But Gandhi had the backing of the people and a whole new generation of Indian nationalists.

In a series of sessions in 1918, 1919 and 1920, where the past and the present generations argued in debates, Gandhi and his young followers imbued the Congress rank-and-file to combat British rule directly. With the 1919 Amritsar Massacre and the riots in Punjab, Indian radicalism was at a peak. With the election of Mohandas K. Gandhi to the presidency of the Indian National Congress, the election was won, and a new path to India's destiny was formed.

Lokmanya Tilak, whom Gandhi had called The Father of Modern India died in 1920, and Gopal Krishna Gokhale had died four years earlier. Motilal Nehru, Lala Lajpat Rai and some other stalwarts backed Gandhi as they were not sure that they can lead the people like Tilak and Gokhale. Thus it was now entirely up to Gandhi's Congress to show the way for the nation.

== The Mahatma Gandhi era ==
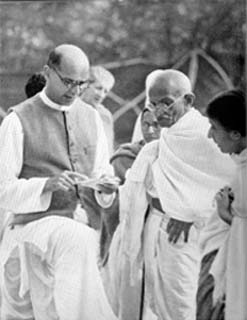
Mohandas Gandhi gave rise to a whole new generation of nationalists, and a whole new form of revolution.

Gandhiji dominated the Indian freedom struggle from 1919 to 1948. That is why this period is known as the Gandhian era in Indian history. During this time, Mahatma Gandhi dominated the Indian National Congress, which in turn was at the forefront of the Indian freedom struggle.

Gandhi joined in 1915 and left the Indian National Congress in 1923.

== Expansion and re-organization ==
Few years after the World War, the Congress expanded considerably, owing to public excitement after Gandhi's success in Champaran and Kheda. A whole new generation of leaders arose from different parts of India, who were committed Gandhians Sardar Vallabhbhai Patel, Rajendra Prasad, Chakravarti Rajagopalachari, Narhari Parikh, Mahadev Desai —as well as hot-blooded nationalists aroused by Gandhi's active leadership —Chittaranjan Das, Subhas Chandra Bose, Srinivasa Iyengar.

Gandhi transformed the Congress from an elitist party based in the cities, to an organization of the people:

- Membership fees were considerably reduced.
- Congress established a large number of state units across India —known as Pradesh Congress Committees —based on its own configuration of India's states on basis of linguistic groups. PCCs emerged for Maharashtra, Karnataka, Gujarat —states that did not yet exist and were spread over hundreds of princely states outside British India.
- All former practices distinguishing Congressmen on basis of caste, ethnicity, religion and sex were eliminated —all-India unity was stressed.
- Native tongues were given official use and respect in Congress meetings —especially Urdu renamed by Gandhi as Hindustani, which was adopted for use by the All India Congress Committee.
- Leadership posts and offices at all levels would be filled by elections, and not by appointments. This introduction of democracy was vital in rejuvenating the party, giving voice to ordinary members as well as valuable practice for Indians in democracy.
- Eligibility for leadership would be determined by how much social work and service a member had done, not by his wealth or social standing.

=== Social development ===
During the 1920s, M.K. Gandhi encouraged tens of thousands of Congress volunteers to embrace a wide variety of organized tasks to address major social problems across India. Under the guidance of Congress committees and Gandhi's network of ashrams in Gujarat, Maharashtra, Uttar Pradesh, Bihar and Tamil Nadu, the Congress attacked:

- Untouchability and caste discrimination
- Alcoholism
- Unhygienic conditions and lack of sanitation
- Lack of health care and medical aid
- Purdah and the oppression of women
- Illiteracy, with the organization of national schools and colleges
- Poverty, with proliferating khadi cloth, cottage industries

Gandhi's work, particularly the establishment of ashrams, contributed to his growing recognition in India. He later became widely known by the honorific "Mahatma", meaning "Great Soul".

== Ascendance to power (1937–1942) ==
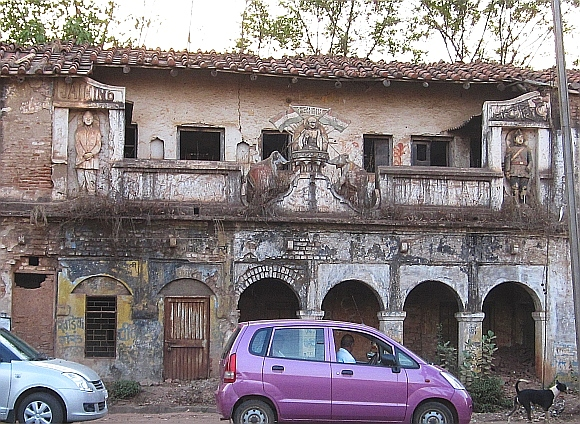
An old building in Katni commemorating India's freedom, with statues of Nehru, Gandhi and Subhas Chandra Bose

Under the Government of India Act 1935, the Congress first tasted political power in the provincial elections of 1937. It performed extraordinarily well, coming to power in eight of the eleven provinces where elections were held. Its internal organization bloomed in the diversity of political attitudes and ideologies. The focus would change slightly from the single-minded devotion to complete independence, to also entertaining excitement and theorizing about the future governance of the nation. However, when the Viceroy Lord Linlithgow declared India a belligerent in World War II without any consultation with the elected representatives of the people, the Congress ministries resigned.

The radical followers of Subhas Chandra Bose, believers in socialism and active revolution would ascend in the hierarchy with Bose's 1938 election to the Congress presidency.

=== Traditionalists ===
According to one approach, the traditionalist point of view, though not in a political sense, was represented in Congressmen like Sardar Vallabhbhai Patel, Rajendra Prasad, C. Rajagopalachari, Purushottam Das Tandon, Khan Abdul Ghaffar Khan and Maulana Azad, who were also associates and followers of Gandhi. Their organizational strength, achieved through leading the clashes with the government, was undisputed and proven when despite winning the 1939 election, Bose resigned from the Congress presidency because of the lack of confidence he enjoyed amongst national leaders. A year earlier, in the 1938 election, however, Bose had been elected with the support of Gandhi. Differences arose in 1939 on whether Bose should have a second term. Jawaharlal Nehru, who Gandhi had always preferred to Bose, had had a second term earlier. Bose's own differences centred on the place to be accorded to non-violent as against revolutionary methods. When he set up his Indian National Army in South-east Asia during the Second World War, he invoked Gandhi's name and hailed him as the Father of The Nation. It would be wrong to suggest that the so-called traditionalist leaders looked merely to the ancient heritage of Indian, Asian or, in the case of Maulana Azad and Khan Abdul Ghaffar Khan, Islamic civilization for inspiration. They believed, along with educationists like Zakir Husain and E W Aryanayakam, that education should be imparted in a manner that enables the learners also to be able to make things with their own hands and learn skills that would make them self-supporting. This method of education was also adopted in some areas in Egypt. (See Reginald Reynolds, Beware of Africans). Zakir Husain was inspired by some European educationists and was able, with Gandhi's support, to dovetail this approach to the one favoured by the Basic Education method introduced by the Indian freedom movement. They believed that the education system, economy and social justice model for a future nation should be designed to suit the specific local requirements. While most were open to the benefits of Western influences and the socio-economic egalitarianism of socialism, they were opposed to being defined by either model.

== The Final Battles ==
The last important episodes in the Congress involved the final step to independence, and the division of the country on the basis of religions.

=== Quit India ===
Chakravarthi Rajagopalachari, the prominent leader from Tamil Nadu resigned from the Congress to actively advocate supporting the British war effort. It was started in 1942.

=== Indian National Army Trials ===
During the INA trials of 1946, the Congress helped to form the INA Defence Committee, which forcefully defended the case of the soldiers of the Azad Hind government. The committee declared the formation of the Congress's defence team for the INA and included famous lawyers of the time, including Bhulabhai Desai, Asaf Ali, and Jawaharlal Nehru. Quit India Bill passed on 8 Aug 1942.

=== Royal Indian Navy Mutiny ===
Some members of the Congress initially supported the sailors who led the Royal Indian Navy Mutiny. However, they withdrew support at the critical juncture, as the mutiny failed.

=== Partition of India ===
Within the Congress, the Partition was opposed by Khan Abdul Ghaffar Khan, Saifuddin Kitchlew, Dr. Khan Sahib and Congressmen from the provinces that would inevitably become parts of Pakistan. Maulana Azad, an Indian Islamic scholar, opposed partition in principle, but did not wish to impede the national leadership; preferred to stay with Indian side.

== 1947–1952: transformation ==
=== Constitution ===
In the Assembly and Constitution debates, the Congress attitude was marked by inclusiveness and liberalism. The Government appointed some prominent Indians who were Raj loyalists and liberals to important offices, and did not adopt any punitive control over the Indian civil servants who had aided the Raj in its governance of India and suppression of nationalist activities.

A Congress-dominated Assembly adopted B.R. Ambedkar, a fierce Congress critic as the chairman of the Constitution draft committee. Syama Prasad Mookerjee, a Hindu Mahasabha leader became the Minister for Industry.

The Congress stood firm on its fundamental promises and delivered a Constitution that abolished untouchability and discrimination based on caste, religion or gender. Primary education was made a right, and Congress governments made the zamindar system illegal, created minimum wages and authorized the right to strike and form labor unions.

=== Leadership change ===
In 1947, the Congress presidency passed upon Jivatram Kripalani, a veteran Gandhian and ally of both Nehru and Patel. India's duumvirate expressed neutrality and full support to the elected winner of the 1947, 1948 and 1949 presidential races.

However, a tug of war began between Nehru and his socialist wing, and Patel and Congress traditionalists broke out in 1950's race. Nehru lobbied intensely to oppose the candidacy of Purushottam Das Tandon, whom he perceived as a Hindu revivalist with "problematic" views on Hindu-Muslim relations. Nehru openly backed Kripalani to oppose Tandon, but neglected courtesy to Patel upon the question.

With Patel's tacit support (especially in Patel's home state of Gujarat, where due to Patel's work, Kripalani received not one vote) Tandon won a tight contest, and Nehru threatened to resign. With Patel's convincing, Nehru did not quit.

However, with Patel's death in 1950, the balance shifted permanently in Nehru's favor. Kripalani, C. Rajagopalachari and Tandon were marginalized, and the Congress Party's election fortunes began depending solely on Nehru's leadership and popularity. With the 1952 election sweep, the Congress became India's main political party.

== Nehru era (1952–1964) ==
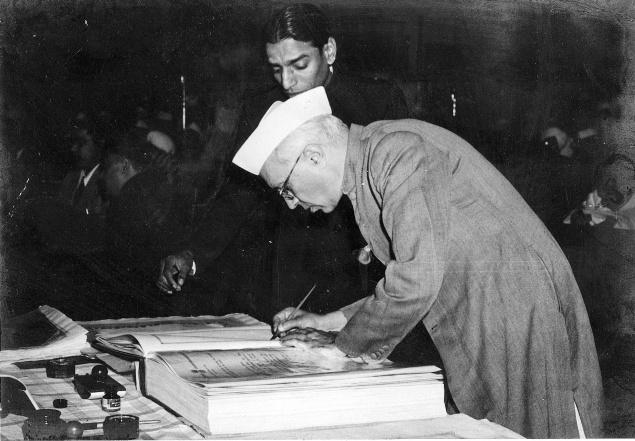
Nehru signing the Indian Constitution, c. 1950

From 1951 until his death in 1964, Jawaharlal Nehru was the paramount leader of the party. Congress gained power in landslide victories in the general elections of 1951–52, 1957, and 1962. During his tenure, Nehru implemented policies based on import substitution industrialisation, and advocated a mixed economy where the government-controlled public sector co-existed with the private sector. He believed the establishment of basic and heavy industries was fundamental to the development and modernisation of the Indian economy. The Nehru government directed investment primarily into key public sector industries—steel, iron, coal, and power—promoting their development with subsidies and protectionist policies. Nehru embraced secularism, socialistic economic practices based on state-driven industrialisation, and a non-aligned and non-confrontational foreign policy that became typical of the modern Congress Party. The policy of non-alignment during the Cold War meant Nehru received financial and technical support from both the Eastern and Western Blocs to build India's industrial base from nothing.

During his period in office, there were four known assassination attempts on Nehru. The first attempt on his life was during partition in 1947 while he was visiting the North-West Frontier Province in a car. The second was by a knife-wielding rickshaw-puller in Maharashtra in 1955. A third attempt happened in Bombay in 1956. The fourth was a failed bombing attempt on railway tracks in Maharashtra in 1961. Despite threats to his life, Nehru despised having excess security personnel around him and did not like his movements to disrupt traffic. K. Kamaraj became the president of the All India Congress Committee in 1963 during the last year of Nehru's life. Prior to that, he had been the chief minister of Madras state for nine years. Kamaraj had also been a member of "the syndicate", a group of right wing leaders within Congress. In 1963 the Congress lost popularity following the defeat in the Indo-Chinese war of 1962. To revitalise the party, Kamaraj proposed the Kamaraj Plan to Nehru that encouraged six Congress chief ministers (including himself) and six senior cabinet ministers to resign to take up party work.

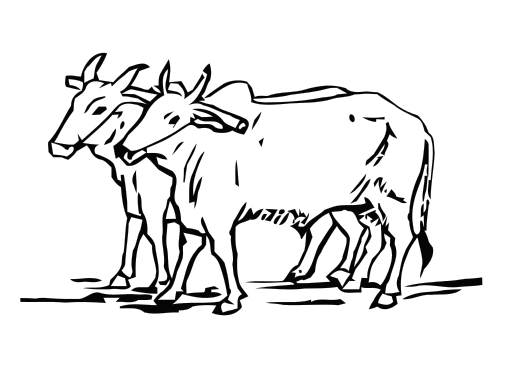
Congress party election symbol (1952–1969)

In 1964, Nehru died because of an aortic dissection, raising questions about the party's future. Following the death of Nehru, Gulzarilal Nanda was appointed as the interim prime minister on 27 May 1964, pending the election of a new parliamentary leader of the Congress party who would then become prime minister. During the leadership contest to succeed Nehru, the preference was between Morarji Desai and Lal Bahadur Shashtri. Eventually, Shashtri was selected as the next parliamentary leader thus the Prime Minister. Kamaraj was widely credited as the "kingmaker" in for ensuring the victory of Lal Bahadur Shastri over Morarji Desai.

== Shastri era (1964–1966) ==
As prime minister, Shastri retained most of members of Nehru's Council of Ministers; T. T. Krishnamachari was retained as Finance Minister of India, as was Defence Minister Yashwantrao Chavan. Shastri appointed Swaran Singh to succeed him as External Affairs Minister. Shastri appointed Indira Gandhi, Jawaharlal Nehru's daughter and former party president, Minister of Information and Broadcasting. Gulzarilal Nanda continued as the Minister of Home Affairs. As Prime Minister, Shastri continued Nehru's policy of non-alignment, but built closer relations with the Soviet Union. In the aftermath of the Sino-Indian War of 1962, and the formation of military ties between China and Pakistan, Shastri's government expanded the defence budget of India's armed forces. He also promoted the White Revolution—a national campaign to increase the production and supply of milk by creating the National Dairy Development Board. The Madras anti-Hindi agitation of 1965 occurred during Shastri's tenure.

Shastri became a national hero following victory in the Indo-Pakistani War of 1965. His slogan, "Jai Jawan Jai Kisan" ("Hail the soldier, Hail the farmer"), became very popular during the war. On 11 January 1966, a day after signing the Tashkent Declaration, Shastri died in Tashkent, reportedly of a heart attack; but the circumstances of his death remain mysterious. After Shastri's death, Congress elected Indira Gandhi as leader over Morarji Desai. Once again, K. Kamaraj was instrumental in achieving this result. The differences among the top leadership of the Congress regarding the future of the party during resulted in the formation of several breakaway parties such as Orissa Jana Congress, Bangla Congress, Utkal Congress, and, Bharatiya Kranti Dal.

== Indira era (1966–1984) ==
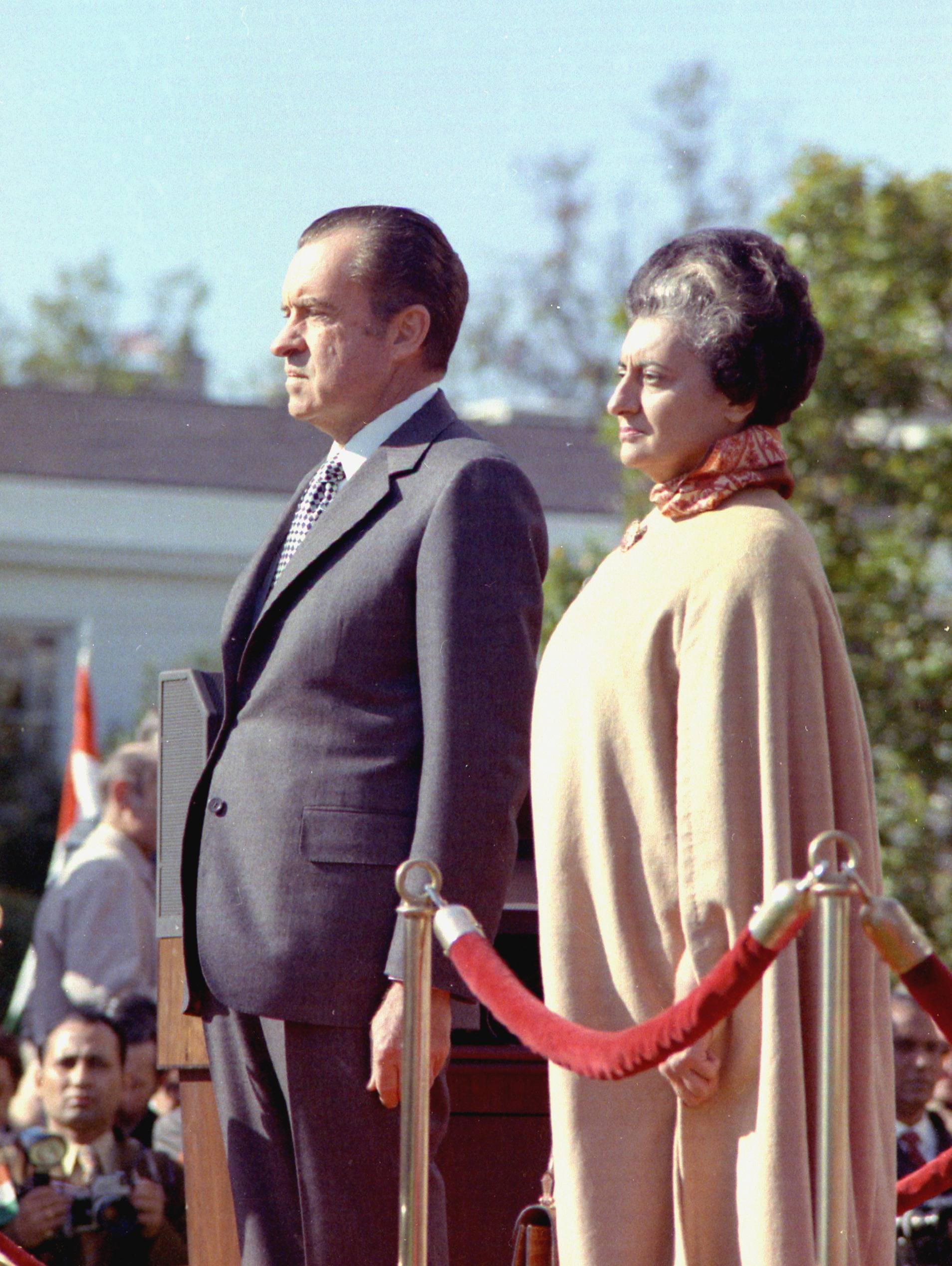
Indira Gandhi with U.S. President Richard Nixon, 1971

In 1967, following a poor performance in the 1967 Indian general election, Indira Gandhi started moving toward the political left. In mid-1969, she was involved in a dispute with senior party leaders on several issues. Notably—her support for the independent candidate, V. V. Giri, rather than the official Congress party candidate, Neelam Sanjiva Reddy, for the vacant post of the president of India and Gandhi's abrupt nationalisation of the 14 biggest banks in India. Later in the year, the Congress party president, S. Nijalingappa, expelled her from the party for indiscipline. Mrs. Gandhi as a counter-move launched her own faction of the INC. It was also known as Congress (R). (Note: The "R" stood for Requisition or Ruling) The original party then came to be known as Indian National Congress (O). (Note: The "O" stands for organisation/Old Congress.) Its principal leaders were Kamraj, Morarji Desai, Nijalingappa and S. K. Patil who stood for a more right-wing agenda. The split occurred when a united opposition under the banner of Samyukt Vidhayak Dal, won control over several states in the Hindi Belt. Indira Gandhi, on the other side, wanted to use a populist agenda in order to mobilise popular support for the party. Her faction, called Congress (R), was supported by most of the Congress MPs while the original party had the support of only 65 MPs. In the All India Congress Committee, 446 of its 705 members walked over to Indira's side. This created a belief among Indians that Indira's Congress was the Real Congress (INC-R). The "Old Congress" retained the party symbol of a pair of bullocks carrying a yoke while Indira's breakaway faction was given a new symbol of a cow with a suckling calf by the Election Commission as the party election symbol.

"India might be an ancient country but was a young democracy and as such should remain vigilant against the domination of few over the social, economic or political systems. Banks should be publicly owned so that they catered to not just large industries and big businesses but also agriculturists, small industries and entrepreneurs. Furthermore, the private banks had been functioning erratically with hundreds of them failing and causing loss to the depositors who were given no guarantee against such loss."

— Gandhi's remarks after the nationalisation of private banks.

In the mid-term parliamentary elections held in 1971, the Gandhi-led Congress (R) won a landslide victory on a platform of progressive policies such as the elimination of poverty (Garibi Hatao). The policies of the Congress (R) under Gandhi before the 1971 elections included proposals to abolish the Privy Purse to former rulers of the Princely states, and the 1969 nationalisation of India's 14 largest banks. The 1969 attempt by Indira Gandhi government to abolish privy purse and the official recognition of the titles did not meet with success. The constitutional Amendment bill to this effect was passed in Lok Sabha, but it failed to get the required two-thirds majority in the Rajya Sabha. However, in 1971, with the passage of the Twenty-sixth Amendment to the Constitution of India, the privy purses were abolished.

Due to Sino-Indian War 1962, India faced a huge budgetary deficit resulting in its treasury being almost empty, high inflation, and dwindling forex reserves. The brief War of 1962 exposed weaknesses in the economy and shifted the focus towards the defence industry and the Indian Army. The government found itself short of resources to fund the Third Plan (1961–1966). Subhadra Joshi a senior party member, proposed a non-official resolution asking for the nationalisation of private banks stating that nationalisation would help in mobilising resources for development. In July 1969, Indira Gandhi through the ordinance nationalised fourteen major private banks. After being re-elected in 1971 on a campaign that endorsed nationalisation, Indira Gandhi went on to nationalise the coal, steel, copper, refining, cotton textiles and insurance industries. The main reason was to protect employment and the interest of the organised labour.

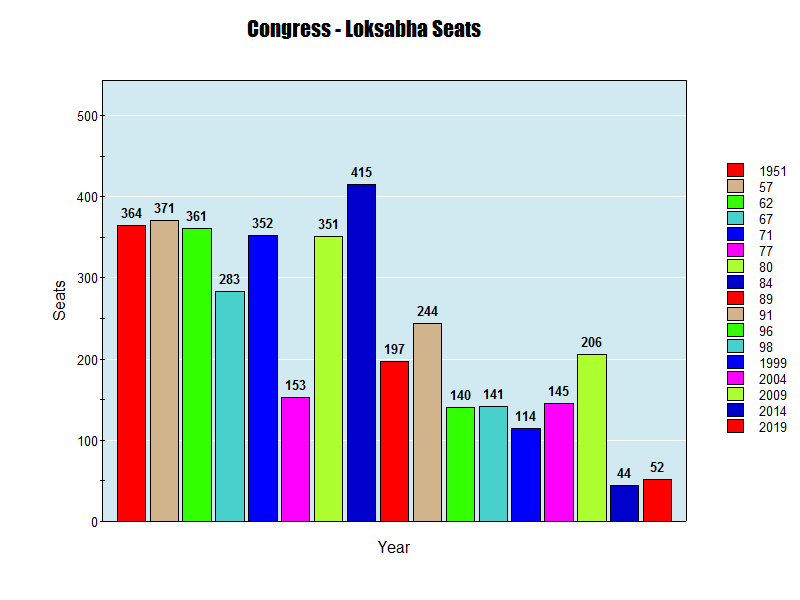
Congress Loksabha seats all time

On 12 June 1975, the High Court of Allahabad declared Indira Gandhi's election to the Lok Sabha, the lower house of India's parliament, void on the grounds of electoral malpractice. However, Gandhi rejected calls to resign and announced plans to appeal to the Supreme Court. In response to increasing disorder and lawlessness, Gandhi's ministry recommended that President Fakhruddin Ali Ahmed declare a State of Emergency, based on the provisions of Article 352 of the Constitution. During the nineteen-month emergency, widespread oppression and abuse of power by Gandhi's unelected younger son and political heir Sanjay Gandhi and his close associates occurred. Implemented on 25 June 1975, the Emergency officially ended on 21 March 1977. All political prisoners were released and fresh elections for the Lok Sabha were called. In parliamentary elections held in March, the Janata alliance of anti-Indira opposition parties won a landslide victory over Congress, winning 295 seats in the Lok Sabha against Congress's 153. Gandhi lost her seat to her Janata opponent Raj Narain. On 2 January 1978, she and her followers seceded and formed a new opposition party, popularly called Congress (I)—the "I" signifying Indira. During the next year, her new party attracted enough members of the legislature to become the official opposition. In November 1978, Gandhi regained a parliamentary seat. In January 1980, following a landslide victory for Congress (I), she was again elected prime minister. The national election commission declared Congress (I) to be the real Indian National Congress for the 1984 general election. However, the designation I was dropped only in 1996.

Gandhi's premiership witnessed increasing turmoil in Punjab, with demands for Sikh autonomy by Jarnail Singh Bhindranwale and his militant followers. In 1983, Bhindranwale with his armed followers headquartered themselves in the Golden Temple in Amritsar and started accumulating weapons. In June 1984, after several futile negotiations, Gandhi ordered the Indian Army to enter the Golden Temple to establish control over the complex and remove Bhindranwale and his armed followers. This event is known as Operation Blue Star. On 31 October 1984, two of Gandhi's bodyguards, Satwant Singh and Beant Singh, shot her with their service weapons in the garden of the prime minister's residence in response to her authorisation of Operation Blue Star. Gandhi was due to be interviewed by British actor Peter Ustinov, who was filming a documentary for Irish television. Her assassination prompted the 1984 anti-Sikh riots, during which 3,000–17,000 people were killed.

== Rajiv Gandhi and Rao era (1984–1998) ==
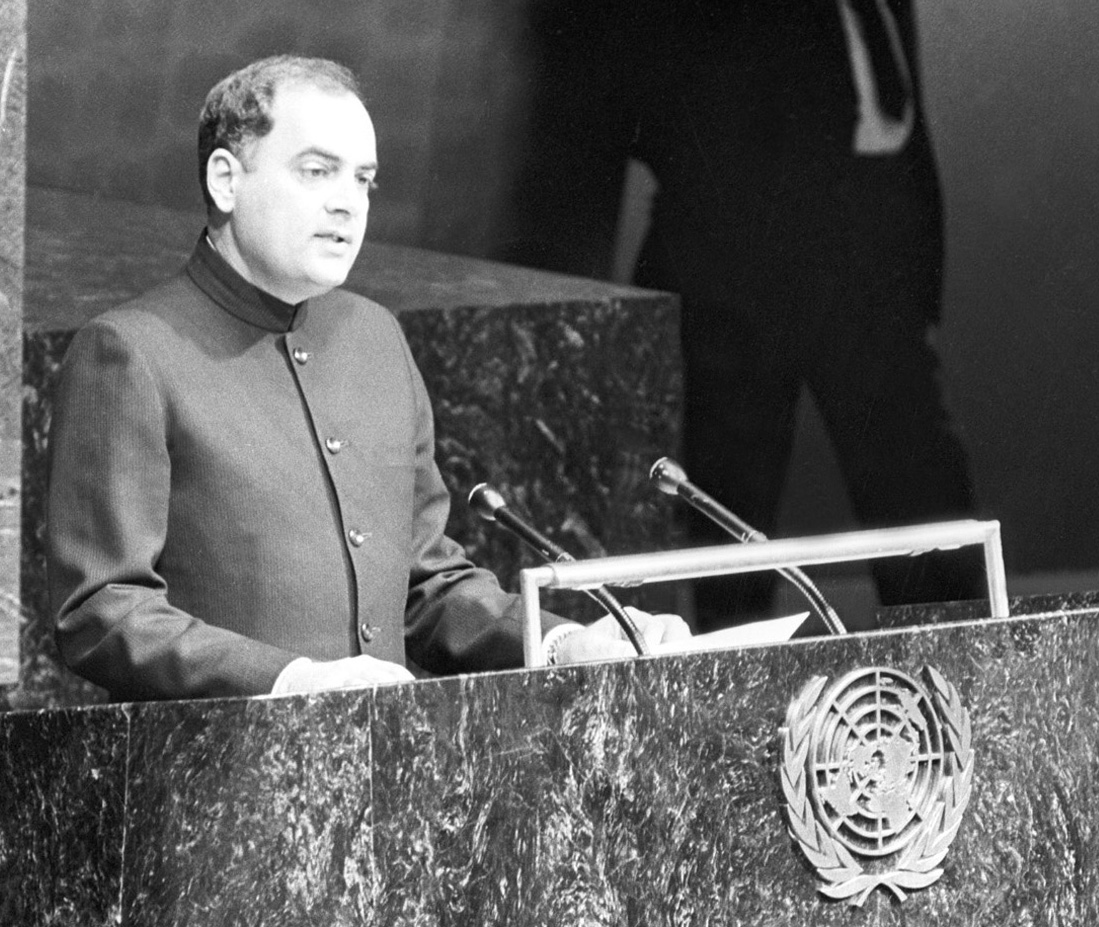
Rajiv Gandhi addressing the Special Session of the United Nations on Disarmament, in New York City in June 1988

In 1984, Indira Gandhi's son Rajiv Gandhi became nominal head of Congress, and went on to become prime minister upon her assassination. In December, he led Congress to a landslide victory, where it secured 401 seats in the legislature. His administration took measures to reform the government bureaucracy and liberalise the country's economy. Rajiv Gandhi's attempts to discourage separatist movements in Punjab and Kashmir backfired. After his government became embroiled in several financial scandals, his leadership became increasingly ineffectual. Gandhi was regarded as a non-abrasive person who consulted other party members and refrained from hasty decisions. The Bofors scandal damaged his reputation as an honest politician, but he was posthumously cleared of bribery allegations in 2004. On 21 May 1991, Gandhi was killed by a bomb concealed in a basket of flowers carried by a woman associated with the Tamil Tigers. He was campaigning in Tamil Nadu for upcoming parliamentary elections. In 1998, an Indian court convicted 26 people in the conspiracy to assassinate Gandhi. The conspirators, who consisted of Tamil militants from Sri Lanka and their Indian allies, had sought revenge against Gandhi because the Indian troops he sent to Sri Lanka in 1987 to help enforce a peace accord there had fought with Tamil Militant guerrillas.

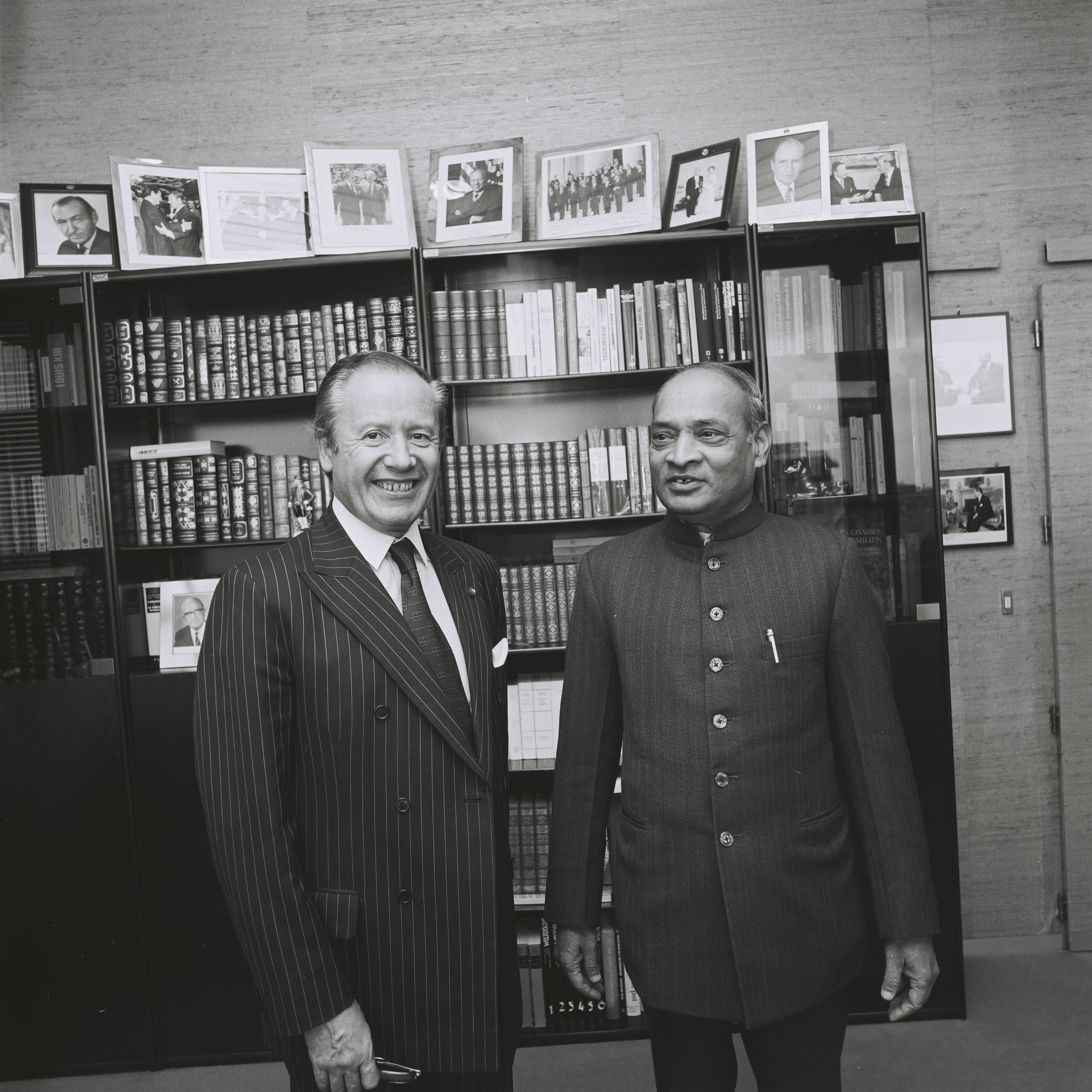
Visit of Narasimha Rao, to the CEC

Rajiv Gandhi was succeeded as party leader by P. V. Narasimha Rao, who was elected prime minister in June 1991. His rise to the prime ministership was politically significant because he was the first holder of the office from South India. After the election, he formed minority government. Rao himself not contested elections in 1991, but after he was sworn in a prime minister, he won in a by-election from Nandyal in Andhra Pradesh. His administration oversaw major economic change and experienced several home incidents that affected India's national security. Rao, who held the Industries portfolio, was personally responsible for the dismantling of the Licence Raj, which came under the purview of the Ministry of Commerce and Industry. He is often called the "father of Indian economic reforms".

Future prime ministers Atal Bihari Vajpayee and Manmohan Singh continued the economic reform policies begun by Rao's government. Rao accelerated the dismantling of the Licence Raj, reversing the socialist policies of previous governments. He employed Manmohan Singh as his finance minister to begin a historic economic change. With Rao's mandate, Singh launched India's globalisation reforms that involved implementing International Monetary Fund (IMF) policies to prevent India's impending economic collapse. Rao was also referred to as Chanakya for his ability to push tough economic and political legislation through the parliament while he headed a minority government.

By 1996, the party's image was suffering from allegations of corruption, and in elections that year, Congress was reduced to 140 seats, its lowest number in the Lok Sabha to that point. Rao later resigned as prime minister and, in September, as party president. He was succeeded as president by Sitaram Kesri, the party's first non-Brahmin leader. During the tenure of both Rao and Kesri, the two leaders conducted internal elections to the Congress working committees and their own posts as party presidents.

== INC (1998–present) ==
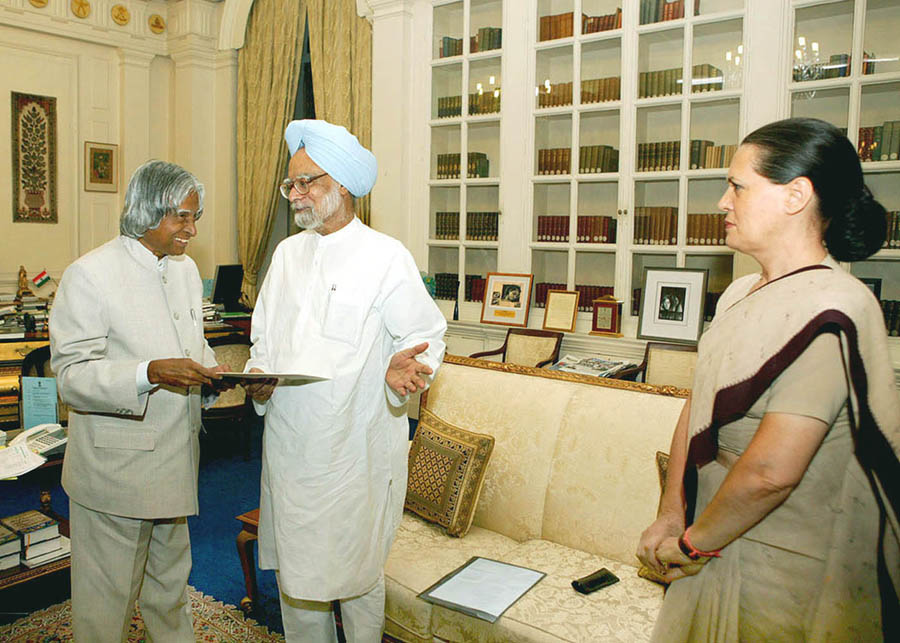
11th President of India A. P. J. Abdul Kalam authorizing the Prime Minister designate Manmohan Singh to form the next Government in New Delhi on 19 May 2004

The 1998 general elections saw Congress win 141 seats in the Lok Sabha, its lowest tally until then. To boost its popularity and improve its performance in the forthcoming election, Congress leaders urged Sonia Gandhi, Rajiv Gandhi's widow, to assume leadership of the party. She had previously declined offers to become actively involved in party affairs and had stayed away from politics. After her election as party leader, a section of the party that objected to the choice because of her Italian ethnicity broke away and formed the Nationalist Congress Party (NCP), led by Sharad Pawar. Sonia Gandhi struggled to revive the party in her early years as its president; she was under continuous scrutiny for her foreign birth and lack of political acumen. In the snap elections called by the National Democratic Alliance (NDA) government in 1999, Congress's tally further plummeted to just 114 seats. Although the leadership structure was unaltered as the party campaigned strongly in the assembly elections that followed, Gandhi began to make such strategic changes as abandoning the party's 1998 Pachmarhi resolution of ekla chalo (go it alone) policy, and formed alliances with other like-minded parties. In the intervening years, the party was successful at various legislative assembly elections; at one point, Congress ruled 15 states.

=== UPA governments (2004–2014) ===
For the 2004 general election, Congress forged alliances with regional parties including the NCP and the Dravida Munnetra Kazhagam. The party's campaign emphasised social inclusion and the welfare of the common masses—an ideology that Gandhi herself endorsed for Congress during her presidency—with slogans such as Congress ka haath, aam aadmi ke saath ("Congress hand in hand with the common man"), contrasting with the NDA's "India Shining" campaign. The Congress-led United Progressive Alliance (UPA) won 222 seats in the new parliament, defeating the NDA by a substantial margin. With the subsequent support of the communist front, Congress won a majority and formed a new government. Despite massive support from within the party, Gandhi declined the post of prime minister, choosing to appoint Manmohan Singh instead. She remained as party president and headed the National Advisory Council (NAC).

During its first term in office, the UPA government passed several social reform bills. These included an employment guarantee bill, the Right to Information Act, and a right to education act. The NAC, as well as the Left Front that supported the government from the outside, were widely seen as being the driving force behind such legislation. The Left Front withdrew its support of the government over disagreements about the U.S.–India Civil Nuclear Agreement. Despite the effective loss of 62 seats in parliament, the government survived the trust vote that followed. In the Lok Sabha elections held soon after, Congress won 207 seats, the highest tally of any party since 1991. The UPA as a whole won 262, enabling it to form a government for the second time. The social welfare policies of the first UPA government, and the perceived divisiveness of the BJP, are broadly credited with the victory.

=== Defeats at national level (2014–present) ===
By the 2014 Lok Sabha elections, the party had lost much of its popular support, mainly because of several years of poor economic conditions in the country, and growing discontent over a series of corruption allegations involving government officials, including the 2G spectrum case and the Indian coal allocation scam. Congress won only 44 seats in the Lok Sabha, compared to the 336 of the BJP and its allies The UPA suffered heavy defeat, which was its worst-ever performance in a national election with its vote share dipping below 20 per cent for the first time. Narendra Modi succeeded Singh as prime minister as the head of the National Democratic Alliance. Sonia Gandhi retired as party president in December 2017, having served for a record nineteen years. She was succeeded by her son Rahul Gandhi, who was elected unopposed in the 2017 INC presidential election.

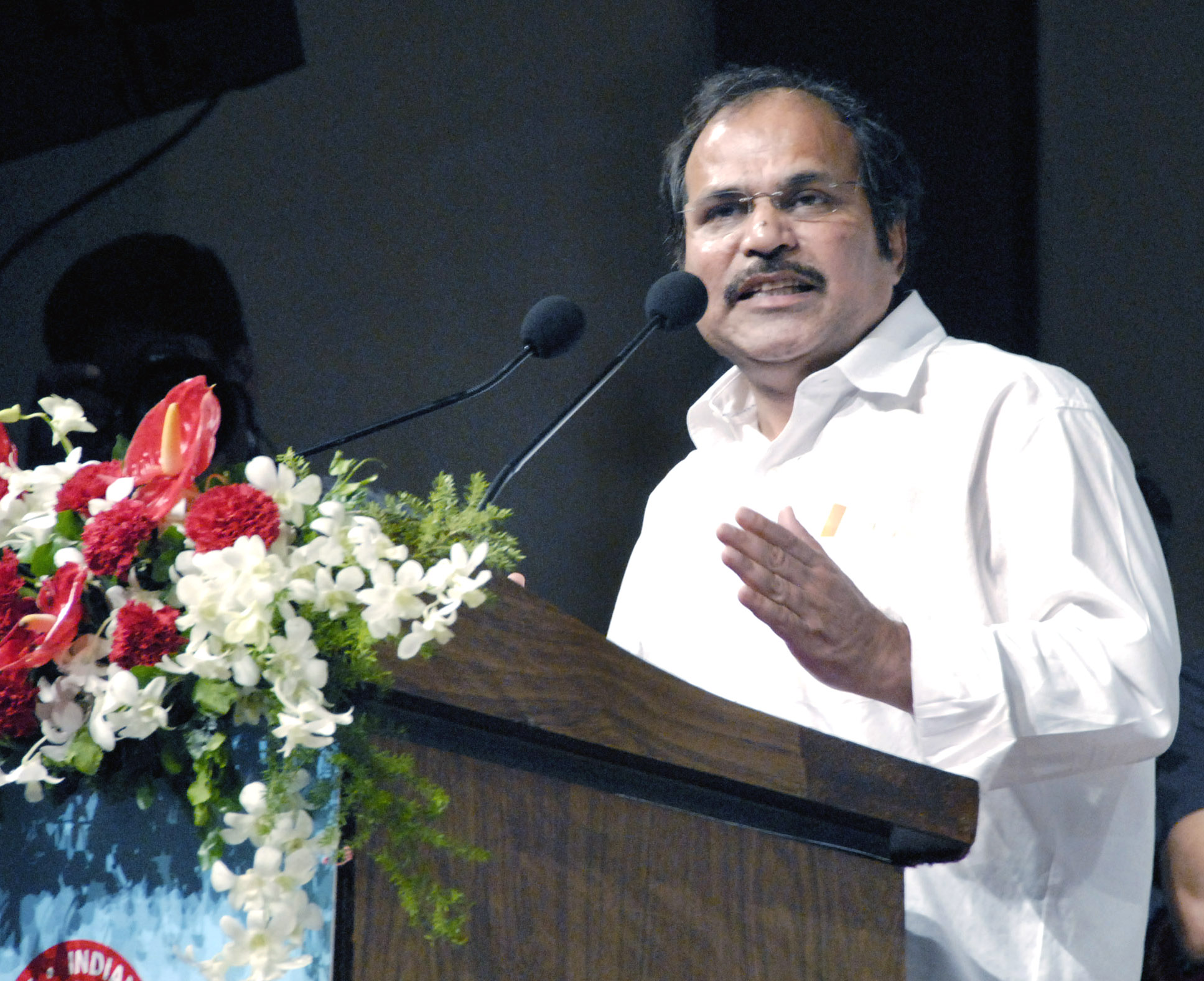
Adhir Ranjan Chowdhury, INC's leader of the Lok Sabha from 2019 to 2024

Rahul Gandhi resigned from his post after the 2019 Indian general election, due to the party's dismal performance. Following Gandhi's resignation, party leaders began deliberations for a suitable candidate to replace him. The Congress Working Committee met on 10 August to make a final decision on the matter and passed a resolution asking Sonia Gandhi to take over as interim president until a consensus candidate could be picked. Rahul Gandhi is the Leader of the Opposition in Lok Sabha. Gaurav Gogoi is deputy leader in Lok Sabha. Based on an analysis of the candidates' poll affidavits, a report by the National Election Watch (NEW) and the Association for Democratic Reforms (ADR) says that, the Congress has highest political defection since 2014. According to the report, a total of 222 electoral candidates have left the Congress to join other parties during polls held between 2014 and 2021, whereas 177 MPs and MLAs quit the party. Defection resulted loss of its established governments in Arunachal Pradesh, Madhya Pradesh, Goa, Karnataka, Puducherry (UT), and Manipur.

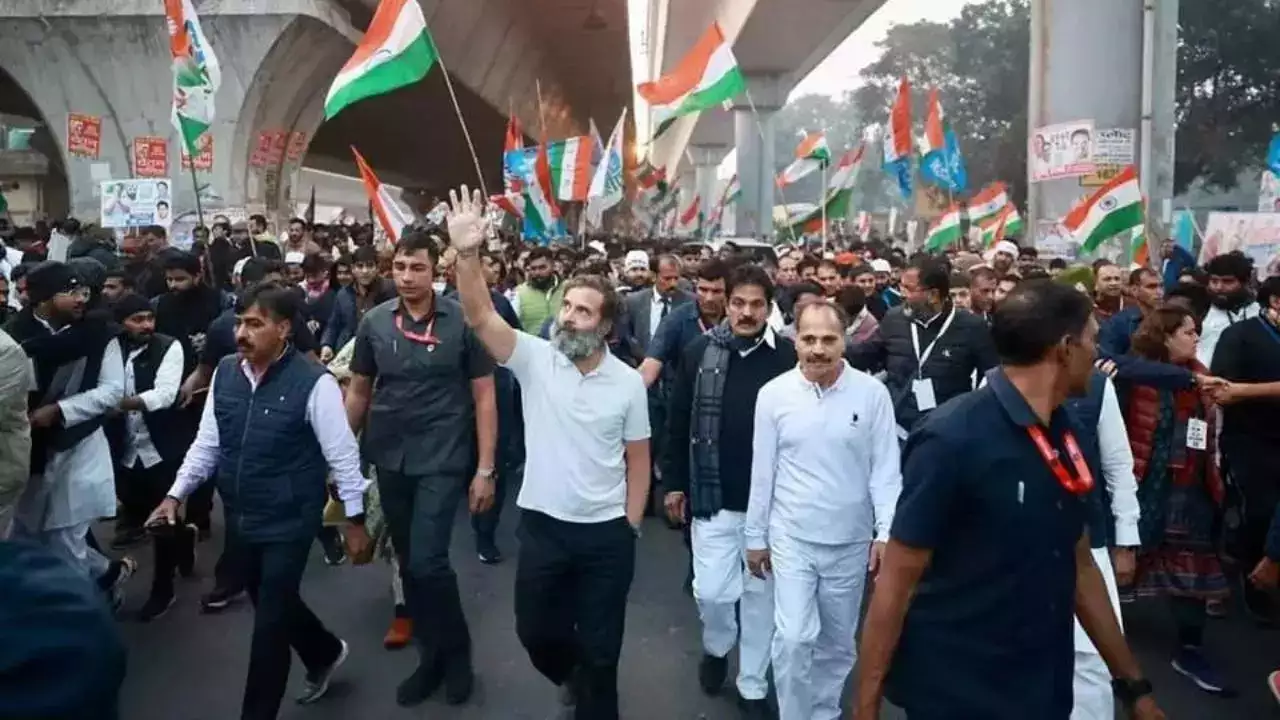
Bharat Jodo Yatra was a march led by Rahul Gandhi from the southern tip of India, to its northernmost territory.

In September 2022, the party launched the Bharat Jodo Yatra, a padayatra from the southern tip of India at Kanyakumari to the northernmost territory of Kashmir, led by Rahul Gandhi. In October, the working committee held the 2022 INC Presidential Election. Sonia Gandhi and Rahul Gandhi both declined to contest, and Mallikarjun Kharge and Shashi Tharoor emerged as the main contenders. Kharge secured 84.14% of the votes, becoming the first non-Gandhi president in 24 years.

In July 2023, the congress, along with 25 political parties made an opposition unity alliance named the Indian National Developmental Inclusive Alliance (known by its backronym as the I.N.D.I.A. alliance) for the 2024 general election against the NDA government. The alliance includes major national and regional parties such as the TMC, AAP, RJD, CPIM, CPI and DMK.

== See also ==
- Indian nationalism
- Indian independence movement
- Satyagraha
- Gandhism
- Indian National Developmental Inclusive Alliance
