= Shah Nawaz Khan (general) =

Azad Indian National Army General and MP

Major General Shah Nawaz Khan
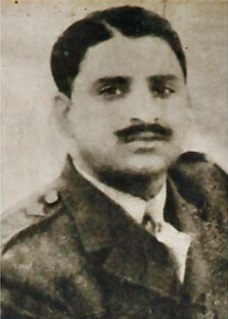
- Khan in the 1940s
- Born: 24 January 1914; Matore, Punjab, British India (present-day Punjab, Pakistan)
- Died: 9 December 1983 (aged 69); Delhi, India
- Spouse: Karim Jaan
- Children: Mahmood Nawaz Khan; Akbar Nawaz Khan; Ajmal Nawaz Khan; Mumtaz Begum; Fehmida Khanum; Lateef Fatima Khan (adopted)
- Relatives: Shah Rukh Khan (nephew); Zaheer-ul-Islam (nephew)
- Military career
- Allegiance: British India (until 1942); Azad Hind (1943 – 1945)
- Conflicts: World War II; Burma campaign; Operation U-Go; Battle of Imphal

Major General Shah Nawaz Khan (January 1914 – 9 December 1983) was an Indian politician who served as an officer in the Indian National Army (INA) during World War II.

He was profoundly influenced by Subhas Chandra Bose's speeches asking POWs to join the Indian National Army and to fight for a free India, Khan led the army into North-Eastern India, seizing Kohima and Imphal which were held briefly by the INA under the authority of the Japanese. In December 1944, Shah Nawaz Khan was appointed Commander of the 1st Division at Mandalay.

After the war, he was tried, convicted for treason, and sentenced to death in a public court-martial carried out by the British Indian Army. The sentence was commuted by the Commander-in-chief of the Indian Army following unrest and protests in India.

After the trial, Khan declared that he would henceforth follow the path of non-violence espoused by Mahatama Gandhi and joined the Congress party. Having successfully contested the first Lok Sabha in 1952 from Meerut, Khan had an illustrious parliamentary career. He was elected four times to the Lok Sabha from Meerut constituency in 1951, 1957, 1962 and 1971.

== Early life and education ==
As he states in his autobiography, Khan was born into a Punjabi Janjua Rajput family on 24 January 1914 in Matore, a village now in the Rawalpindi District of Pakistan. His father Lt. Tikka Khan served in the British Indian Army for some 30 years, being associated with the 58th Vaughan's Rifles (Frontier Force) military unit, other relatives having also served in the armed forces, Shah Nawaz Khan writing that his family might have been "the most militarized" in India.

He was the cousin of Bollywood actor Shah Rukh Khan's father Mir Taj Mohammed Khan, although according to Shah Rukh Khan his paternal grandfather, Mir Jan Muhammad Khan, was an ethnic Pashtun from Afghanistan. However, Shah Rukh Khan's cousins, who still live in Peshawar, have refuted the notion that the family is Pashtun or that his grandfather moved from Afghanistan, as they speak Hindko, a dialect of Punjabi. (Note: Although the mother of Shahrukh Khan was reported to be the adopted daughter of Shah Nawaz, the Indian Army denied those reports. According to Khan, his father was the cousin of Shah Nawaz.)

Other relatives served in the Pakistan Army, including his nephew Lieutenant-General (r) Zaheer-ul-Islam, who was the Director-General of the ISI between 2012 and 2014.

He got his military education at the Prince of Wales Royal Indian Military College. He was commissioned into the 14th Punjab Regiment.

== Military career ==
=== The Second World War and the Indian National Army ===
Khan, who rose to the rank of captain in the Indian Army, was captured by the Japanese after the fall of Singapore in 1942. A prisoner of war in Singapore, he was profoundly influenced by Subhas Chandra Bose's speeches asking POWs to join the Indian National Army and to fight for a free India. He later stated:

It will not be wrong to say that I was hypnotized by his personality and his speeches. He placed the true picture of India before us and for the first time in my life I saw India, through the eyes of an Indian.

Impressed by Bose's patriotic speeches, Nawaz joined the INA in 1943. He was included in the Cabinet of the Provisional Government of Free India formed by Bose. Later, Bose decided to select a regiment consisting of the cream of the INA and send it to action to spearhead the advance into India. Khan led the army into North-Eastern India, seizing Kohima and Imphal which were held briefly by the INA under the authority of the Japanese. In December 1944, Shah Nawaz Khan was appointed Commander of the 1st Division at Mandalay.

=== Indian National Army trials ===
Khan was tried, along with General Prem Sahgal and Colonel Gurbaksh Singh Dhillon and Brigadier Habib ur Rehman of Panjeri (Bhimber) for "waging war against the King Emperor" in a public court martial at the Red Fort in Delhi. They were defended by Sir Tej Bahadur Sapru, Jawaharlal Nehru, Asaf Ali, Bhulabhai Desai, Kailash Nath Katju and others based on the defence that they should be treated as prisoners of war as they were not paid mercenaries but bona fide soldiers of a legal government, the Provisional Government of Free India, or the Azad Hind Government, "however misinformed or otherwise they had been in their notion of patriotic duty towards their country" and as such they recognized the free Indian state as their sovereign and not the British sovereign. During the trial, Khan cited the differential treatment meted out to Indian versus British soldiers in the Indian Army. In his testimony, Khan testified that no Indian officers were given the command of a division and only one was allowed to command a Brigade. Khan was given the death sentence by the court but that sentence was reduced to cashiering by the Commander-in-Chief of the Indian Army.

== Political career ==
=== Association with Mahatma Gandhi ===
After the trial, Khan declared that he would henceforth follow the path of non-violence espoused by Gandhi and he joined the Congress party. In 1946, Major General Shah Nawaz Khan accompanied Mahatma Gandhi and Abdul Ghaffar Khan to restore peace and provide succour to the Noakhali riot victims.

=== Shahnawaz Committee ===
In 1956, the government constituted a committee to look into the circumstances around Subhas Chandra Bose's death with Khan as the head. The committee included Bose's elder brother Suresh Chandra Bose. The committee began its work in April 1956 and concluded four months later when two out of the three members (excluding Suresh Chandra Bose) concluded that Bose had died in the airplane crash at Taihoku (Japanese for Taipei) in Formosa (now Taiwan), on 18 August 1945. They stated that his ashes were kept in Japan's Renkoji Temple and should be relocated to India.

=== Electoral politics ===
Having successfully contested the first Lok Sabha in 1952 from Meerut, Khan had an illustrious parliamentary career becoming:

- The Parliamentary Secretary and Deputy Minister of Railway and Transport for 11 years (1952–1956) & (1957–1964 (second term))
- Minister of Food & Agriculture (1965)
- Minister of Labour, Employment & Rehabilitation (1966)
- Minister of Steel & Mines and Minister of Petroleum & Chemical Industries (1971–1973)
- Minister of Agriculture & Irrigation (1974–1975)
- Minister of Agriculture & Irrigation (1975–1977)
- Chairman of National Seeds Corporation Ltd.
- Chairman, Food Corporation of India.

He was elected four times to the Lok Sabha from Meerut constituency in 1951, 1957, 1962 and 1971. He lost in the 1967 and 1977 Lok Sabha election from Meerut. Though his entire family remained in Pakistan, he chose to live in India, along with one of his sons. During the 1965 war, his son Mahmud was a Pakistan Army Officer and the opposition demanded he be removed from the government. But Lal Bahadur Shastri, as Prime Minister, refused to accede and reminded them of his selfless service to India as an Officer of the INA.

Khan's political views were leftist, supporting land reforms and public distribution. But his support for permanent separate personal laws for religious communities led to his defeat in the 1967 elections against Jan Sangh. In 1969, the Indian National Congress split, leading him to side with Indira Gandhi. The 1971 "Gareebi Hatao" campaign brought him again as MP from Meerut. In 1977, the Janata Party led to his defeat and ended his career in Parliament.

== Last years and death ==
He remained as head of Congress Sewa Dal until his death in 1983. He was buried in a garden near to the Red Fort and Jama Masjid with full state honours.

== In popular culture ==
Shah Nawaz Khan is a 1987 Indian short documentary film directed by J. S. Bandekar and produced by the Films Division of India. It covers his life and contributions to the Indian independence movement.

In the 2005 movie Netaji Subhas Chandra Bose: The Forgotten Hero, Khan was portrayed by actor Sonu Sood. In the 2017 film Raagdesh on the Red Fort Trials, he is portrayed by actor Kunal Kapoor.

He also contributed in the development of Subhas Chandra, a 1966 Indian biographical drama film on the life of Subhas Chandra Bose.

== Book ==
- My Memories of I.N.A. and Its Netaji, Other Press, 2019, 320 p.
