= Kunal Kapoor (actor, born 1977) =

Indian actor (born 1977)

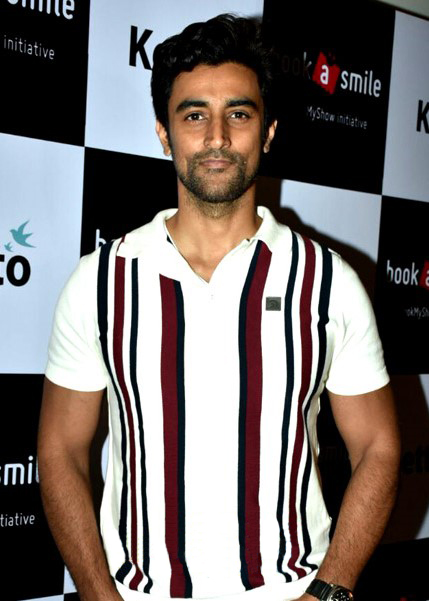
- Kapoor in 2018
- Born: 18 October 1977 (age 49); Mumbai, Maharashtra, India
- Occupation: Actor
- Years active: 2004–present
- Spouse: Naina Bachchan (m. 2015)
- Children: 1
- Family: Bachchan family (by marriage)

Kunal Kishore Kapoor (born 18 October 1977), professionally known as Kunal Kapoor, is an Indian actor who works predominantly in Hindi films. Kapoor is a recipient of several accolades including a Stardust Award and an Asiavision Award.

Kapoor started his career as an assistant director, and made his acting debut with the MF Hussain 2004 film Meenaxi: A Tale of Three Cities. Following a career breakthrough with Rang De Basanti (2006), Kapoor went onto appear in Aaja Nachle, Laaga Chunari Mein Daag in (2007), Bachna Ae Haseeno (2008), Welcome to Sajjanpur (2008), Don 2 (2011), Luv Shuv Tey Chicken Khurana (2012), Dear Zindagi (2016), Veeram (2016), Gold (2018) After a break, Kapoor earned critical acclaim for his portrayal of Babur, in The Empire (2021). The actor will be seen next in the magnum opus Ramayan along with Ranbir Kapoor and Sai Pallavi. He was also seen in the Sidharth Anand, Netflix film Jewel Thief co starring Saif Ali Khan.

Along with his acting career, Kapoor is a writer, entrepreneur and co-founder of Ketto, Asia’s largest crowdfunding platform. The platform has raised over 150 million dollars for social and medical causes. Kapoor is married to Naina Bachchan, with whom he has a son.

He is also a trained pilot and has participated in rally and Formula 3 racing. In addition to his work in entertainment, he has been an active angel investor in various emerging technology companies. He is a fellow of the Aspen Leadership Program.

== Early life ==
Kapoor was born in Mumbai, Maharashtra, India on 18 October 1977. His father, Kishore Kapoor was in the construction business while his mother, Kanan is a singer and homemaker. His parents are originally from Amritsar, Punjab. He is the youngest of three children, with two sisters Geeta and Reshma.

== Career ==
=== Debut and breakthrough (2004-2011) ===
Kapoor trained for an acting career under Barry John, and became a part of Motley, a theatre group run by acting legend Naseeruddin Shah. He began his career as an assistant director of Aks, Kapoor made his acting debut playing Kameshwar, a car mechanic, opposite Tabu in Meenaxi: A Tale of Three Cities, which was helmed by painter MF Hussain and released in 2004. Ronjita Kulkarni of Rediff.com termed him "a pleasant surprise" and added, "His freshness adds appeal to his character, yet he emotes like a seasoned actor."

In 2006, Kapoor had his breakthrough with Rakeysh Omprakash Mehra's Rang De Basanti, where he played a college student who after a tragedy, fights against corruption with his friends. The film was critically and commercially successful and was nominated for Best Foreign Film at the 2007 BAFTA Awards. Kamlesh Pandey, while writing for The Hindu, praised him and stated that he scores with his "understated performance and intensity". Kapoor earned a nomination for Filmfare Award for Best Supporting Actor. It also became the seventh-highest grossing Hindi film of the year.

Kapoor had three releases in 2007. Firstly, he played a cricket obsessed man in Hattrick alongside Rimi Sen. Yash Raj Films subsequently signed Kapoor for a three-film contract, two of which released in the same year. He played Vivaan in Laaga Chunari Mein Daag, opposite Konkona Sen Sharma. Kapoor reunited with Sen Sharma in Aaja Nachle, where he played Imran, a ring master who is forced to play Manju in a play. Khalid Mohammed from Hindustan Times found him a bit "confused".

Kapoor played a Punjabi, Joginder opposite Minissha Lamba in the 2008 film Bachna Ae Haseeno, his third with Yash Raj Films. It became the eighth-highest grossing Hindi film of the year. In the same year, he played Bansi Ram, a laborer at a dockyard in Welcome to Sajjanpur, opposite Amrita Rao. The film was a critical and commercial success. Taran Adarsh termed his presence as a "surprise".

After this, Kapoor took a break for two years. In 2010, he then played an aspiring Kashmiri politician in Rahul Dholakia's Lamhaa co-starring Sanjay Dutt. It was a box office failure, but critics hailed his performance as "one of the most powerful performances of the year". In 2011, Kapoor played Sameer, a hacker in Shah Rukh Khan starrer Don 2. The film became the second-highest grossing film of the year. Bollywood Hungama found Kapoor to be "decent" but thought that he doesn't really get the scenes to prove his credentials.

=== Career fluctuations (2012-2020) ===
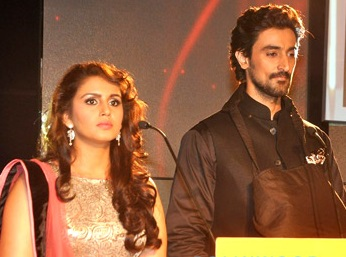
Kapoor promoting Luv Shuv Tey Chicken Khurana

In 2012, Kapoor appeared in Sameer Sharma's Luv Shuv Tey Chicken Khurana, which he co-wrote. Alongside Huma Qureshi, he played a Omi, who desire to go to London but is forced to move back home. Rachel Saltz of The New York Times called Kapoor the Indian Matthew McConaughey. Live Mint's Sanjukta Sharma stated, "Kapoor is not the cynosure, but he pulls off the silliness and sensitivity of Omi’s character capably." Post a two year hiatus, Kapoor appeared in Kaun Kitne Paani Mein, in 2015. He played Raj, an upper caste boy alongside Radhika Apte. Renuka Vyavahare of Times of India found him to be "aptly cast", but his love story with Apte was termed to "digresses from the core subject".

In 2016, Kapoor played Raghuvendra, a film producer opposite Alia Bhatt in Dear Zindagi. It emerged as a commercial success. Sweta Kaushal of Hindustan Times noted, "Kunal Kapoor, gets an edge among the youngsters and essays his part with finesse." That same year, Kapoor voiced for Rama in Mahayoddha Rama, an animation film by Raizada Rohit Jaising Vaid. In her final work of the year, Kapoor appeared in the trilingual film, Veeram, directed by Jayaraj. He played a sixteenth century warrior Chandu Chekavar, in his Malayalam debut. His performance won him an Asiavision Award. G. Ragesh of Onmanorama praised his "exceptional skills in kalari" and said that Kapoor "looks every bit" the masculine Chandu.

Tigmanshu Dhulia's Raag Desh, based on the Indian National Army trials was Kapoor only release in 2017. He played Shah Nawaz Khan, and Saibal Chatterjee of NDTV stated that Kapoor delivered a "steady performance". He also appeared in a short film, White Shirt, in the same year.

Kapoor played a hockey player, Samrat in his first release of 2018, Gold. The film is based on the journey of India's national hockey team to the 1948 Summer Olympics. It was a critical and commercial success. Devesh Sharma of Filmfare noted, "Kunal Kapoor as the strict coach lend gravitas." Kapoor played David in his Telugu debut, Devadas, another major box office success that earned him SIIMA Award for Best Actor in a Negative Role – Telugu nomination. His final release that year was the English film Noblemen, where he played Murali, a drama teacher. Sreeparna Sengupta of Times of India found him to be "charming and effective".

=== Recent work and web expansion (2021-present) ===
Kapoor returned to films in 2021. His first release was Koi Jaane Na, opposite Amyra Dastur, where he played Kabir, a writer and vigilante. Aditya Mani Jha of Firstpost found his performance "underwhelming". Kapoor then made his web debut, playing Mughal emperor Babur opposite Sahher Bambba, who played his wife, in The Empire. Vibha Maru of India Today praised Kapoor and noted, "The actor breathes life into the character of Babur. Instead of making him a larger-than-life figure, Kunal shows Babur's vulnerability and everything else that makes him human." While Pradeep Menon of Firstpost added, "Kunal cuts an impressive figure as Babur, but he is caricatures at the end of the day." Netflix's anthology Ankahi Kahaniya, marked his final work of the year. The Quint's Stutee Ghosh noted, "The film is quite bizzare, though, Kunal Kapoor is effortlessly charming and one sure wants to see more of him."

== Personal life ==
A year after getting engaged, Kapoor married Naina Bachchan, niece of Amitabh Bachchan in a private family ceremony in Seychelles on 9 February 2015. A celebration dinner was held on 11 April 2015 in New Delhi. Bachchan is a banker by profession. The couple announced the birth of their baby boy on 31 January 2022.

== Other work and media image ==
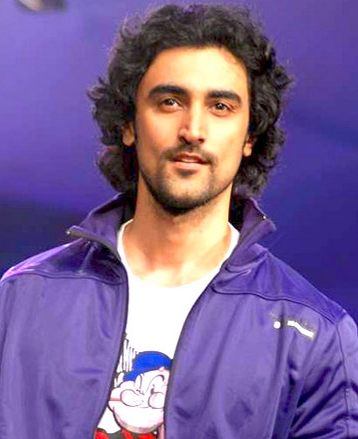
Kapoor in 2015

Filmfare termed Kapoor an "interesting actor" and added, "Kapoor may not feature in many films, but there is something about him that makes the audience sit back and take notice of him."

In 2009, Kapoor started writing weekly columns for HT City, the lifestyle supplement of the Hindustan Times. These columns ended in November 2009 but still appear online on the social network Desimartini.

He is a trained pilot and rally car driver. In 2014, he started training for the Formula Three. He co-founded Asia's largest crowdfunding platform called Ketto, which raises money for social and individual causes. To date, the platform has raised close to 120 million dollars and is one of the largest crowdfunding platforms in the world. He is also known to be an avid investor in early stage tech companies with investments ranging from FMCG companies to robotics

He is also known for his style and has been voted amongst the most stylish men in the country. He was on GQ's list of the top ten stylish men in the country.

== Filmography ==
=== Films ===
- All films are in Hindi unless otherwise noted.

Year	Title	Role	Notes	Ref.
2001	Aks	—N/a	Assistant director	
2004	Meenaxi: A Tale of Three Cities	Kameshwar Mathur	Credited as Kunnal Kapoor	
2006	Rang De Basanti	Aslam Khan / Ashfaqulla Khan (Note: Kapoor played a single character with two or more names)		
2007	Hattrick	Sarabjeet "Saby" Singh		
2007	Laaga Chunari Mein Daag	Vivaan Verma		
2007	Aaja Nachle	Imran Pathan / Majnu		
2008	Bachna Ae Haseeno	Joginder "Jogi" Singh Ahluwalia		
2008	Welcome to Sajjanpur	Bansi Ram		
2010	Lamhaa	Aatif Hussain		
2011	Don 2	Sameer "Sam" Ali		
2012	Luv Shuv Tey Chicken Khurana	Omi Khurana		
2015	Kaun Kitne Paani Mein	Raj Singhdeo		
2016	Dear Zindagi	Raghuvendra		
2016	Mahayoddha Rama	Rama	Animated film; Voice only	
2016	Veeram	Chandu Chekavar	Simultaneously shot in Malayalam and English	
2017	Raag Desh	Shah Nawaz Khan		
2017	White Shirt	Aveek	Short film	
2018	Gold	Samrat		
2018	Devadas	David	Telugu film	
2018	Noblemen	Murali	English film	
2021	Koi Jaane Na	Kabir Kapoor		
2021	Ankahi Kahaniya	Manav	Saket Chaudhary's segment	
2025	Jewel Thief	Vikram Patel		
2026	Ek Din	Nakul Bhasin		
2026	Ramayana: Part 1	Indra		
2026	Vishwambhara †	TBA	Telugu film; filming	

=== Television ===
Year	Title	Role	Notes	Ref.
2017	Bar Code	Himself	Special appearance	
2021	The Empire	Babur		

== Awards and nominations ==
- 2006: Star's Sabsey Favourite Naya Hero
- 2007: Stardust Breakthrough Performance, Male

Year	Award	Category	Film	Result	Ref.
2005	Zee Cine Awards	Best Newcomer	Meenaxi: A Tale of Three Cities	Nominated	
2007	Filmfare Awards	Best Supporting Actor	Rang De Basanti	Nominated	
2007	International Indian Film Academy Awards	Best Supporting Actor	Rang De Basanti	Nominated	
2017	Asiavision Awards	Outstanding Performance of the Year	Veeram	Won	
2019	South Indian International Movie Awards	Best Actor in a Negative Role – Telugu	Devadas	Nominated	

== See also ==
- Bachchan Family
