= Hattrick (film) =

- Theatrical release poster
- Directed by: Milan Luthria
- Written by: Saurabh Shukla (dialogue)
- Screenplay by: Rajat Aroraa
- Story by: Rajat Aroraa
- Produced by: Ronnie Screwvala
- Starring: Rimi Sen; Kunal Kapoor; Nana Patekar; Danny Denzongpa; Paresh Rawal; Asawari Joshi
- Cinematography: Nirmal Jani
- Edited by: Aarif Sheikh
- Music by: Pritam
- Production company: UTV Motion Pictures
- Release date: 16 March 2007
- Running time: 110 minutes
- Country: India
- Language: Hindi

Hattrick is a 2007 Indian Hindi-language sports comedy film directed by Milan Luthria, starring Rimi Sen, Kunal Kapoor, Nana Patekar, Danny Denzongpa, and Paresh Rawal.

== Plot ==
Dr. Satyajit Chavan is the head doctor at a civil hospital in Delhi. Satyajit is well regarded and respected, but lacks bedside manners and is generally rude to everyone. His staff of doctors, most of whom are young interns fresh out of medical school, inquire about his bedside manner. He informs them that his job is to treat patients and that beds must be allocated to the ones who are most likely to survive and get better. We discover that government hospitals (especially in large cities like Mumbai) are limited in bed space and attract the worst stricken patients in the city. These draconian conditions have shaped Satyajit and his views on treatment.

Sarbajeet "Saby" Singh and Kashmira Singh are a young Punjabi couple; they are about to marry. In a departure from the arranged marriages, they have chosen each other independently. They invite their parents to a joint dinner and inform them of their choice. The parents are cheerful to oblige, and they gladly arrange the wedding ceremony. Once married, however, Saby and Kashmira discover their varying interests and aspirations. The main conflict is around cricket: Saby is a great fan of cricket, and Kashmira does not care very much for the sport. Saby watches every India match with unfailing zeal. Kashmira however is left alone and unattended, and she gradually feels abandoned and unloved.

Hemendra "Hemu" Patel is a janitor working at a London airport. He represents the journey of a poor immigrant. His main goal is to secure British citizenship so that he can return to India with great ceremony (as he has seen bestowed upon his other relatives who have attained foreign citizenship). He deals with the cultural differences of his UK-inclined teenage daughter. His wife Priya is affectionate and supportive. Though she does not share his obsequious quest for British citizenship, she generally encourages him to achieve his goals.

David Abraham, affectionately called "Chinaman" by fans, is a celebrated Indian cricketer. He has retired from active international cricket, but he is frequently invited to games (for commentary), functions and sporting events as the guest of honor.

Saby's parents confront him. They point out that he has ignored Kashmira in his zealous enthusiasm for cricket. How will she be able to love him when he is not able to understand her needs? He finally understands this, and returns to Kashmira with a renewed zest for making her happy. They are reunited.

== Cast ==
- Nana Patekar as Dr. Satyajit Chavan
- Danny Denzongpa as David Abraham aka David Anna
- Paresh Rawal as Hemendra Harshadbhai “Hemu” Patel (the illegal immigrant in UK)
- Kunal Kapoor as Sarabjeet 'Saby' Singh (man obsessed with cricket)
- Rimi Sen as Kashmira Singh (wife of the man obsessed with cricket)
- Asawari Joshi as Priya Patel, Hemu Patel's Wife
- Prateeksha Lonkar as Mrs. Chavan
- Manoj Pahwa as Aslam Shaikh
- Amruta Khanvilkar as Hemendra patel's daughter
- John Abraham as Guest appearance

== Soundtrack ==
Hattrick

Soundtrack album by Pritam Chakraborty
- Released: 24 February 2007 (Digital Release); 16 March 2007 (Film Release)
- Recorded: 8 December 2006
- Genre: filmi
- Length: 50:43
- Label: Saregama
- Producer: Pritam Chakraborty

Pritam Chakraborty chronology
Bhagam Bhag (2006)	Hattrick (2007)	Just Married (2006)

All lyrics are written by Mayur Puri; all music is composed by Pritam.

No.	Title	Singer(s)	Length
1.	"Ek Pal Mein"	KK	5:06
2.	"Rabba Khair Kare" (Part 1)	Labh Janjua	3:56
3.	"Wicket Bacha"	Usha Uthup & Earl D'Souza	4:03
4.	"Kahan Kho Gaya" (Part 1)	Soham Chakraborty	5:19
5.	"I Am Coming Home"	Roop Kumar Rathod, Caralisa Monteiro	6:26
6.	"Jab Chhaaye Mera Jaadu"	Mahalakshmi Iyer	4:29
7.	"Rabba Khair Kare" (Part 2)	Labh Janjua	3:48
8.	"Kahan Kho Gaya" (Part 2)	Soham Chakraborty	5:20
9.	"I Am Coming Home" (Reprise)	Rana Majumdar	5:21
10.	"Rabba Khair Kare" (Remix)	Labh Janjua	3:48
11.	"Wicket Bacha" (Club Remix)	Earl D'Souza, Usha Uthup	3:00
Total length:			50:43
