= Anavil =

Brahmin Community

Anavil Brahmin
- Religions: Hinduism
- Languages: Gujarati
- Country: India
- Populated states: Gujarat
- Region: West India
- Ethnicity: Indian

Anavil Brahmins are a community who despite not being numerically superior, are particularly dominant in the Surat and Bulsar districts of south Gujarat, India, where they have been significant land-owners and have an influential role in politics.

The Anavils claim themselves to be Kānyakubja Brahmins who migrated from Kannauj to Gujarat in the early medieval period and were never involved in priestly functions. According to Shah, most other Brahmins in the region do not consider the Anavils to be Brahmins because they are neither priests nor connected to Sanskritic learning. They comprise two sub-groups, called the Desai and the Bhathela, though both use the surname Desai. The former acted as tax farmers during the era of the Mughal Empire, and developed into one of the dominant land-owning groups in South Gujarat. They eventually underwent a process of Sanskritisation that saw them conform more closely to the classical Brahmin practices, such as dowry marriage, while the Bhathela continued to follow the brideprice system for marriage. The Desai are fewer in number but superior in traditional status. Among the Desais, the Pedivalas were the highest, and were respected as the local representatives for the Mughals.

They did not practice female infanticide.

Srinivas and van deer Veen state that the Pedivala Desais paid dowry to their bridegroom's family, even though the bridegroom's family was considered inferior in status to the Pedivalas. According to the mindset of the Pedivalas, the dowry was considered to be dakshina accompanying the bride in the kanyadan rite.

The Anavils are associated with the expansion of agriculture in south Gujarat. As Mughal authority in the region weakened, the Anavils were able to expand their territory and control. Since the Mughal Empire wanted to expand the area of land under cultivation, they confirmed the Anavils' aristocratic statuses and employed them in local administration. The Anavils' power was further solidified during Maratha rule of the region.

Formerly the Anavils accepted brides from Patidar families.

== Notable people ==
- Bhulabhai Desai (1877-1946), Indian independence activist and acclaimed lawyer
- Morarji Desai (1896-1995), independence activist and Prime Minister of India
