= Hikaru Ito =

Japanese baseball player (born 1989)

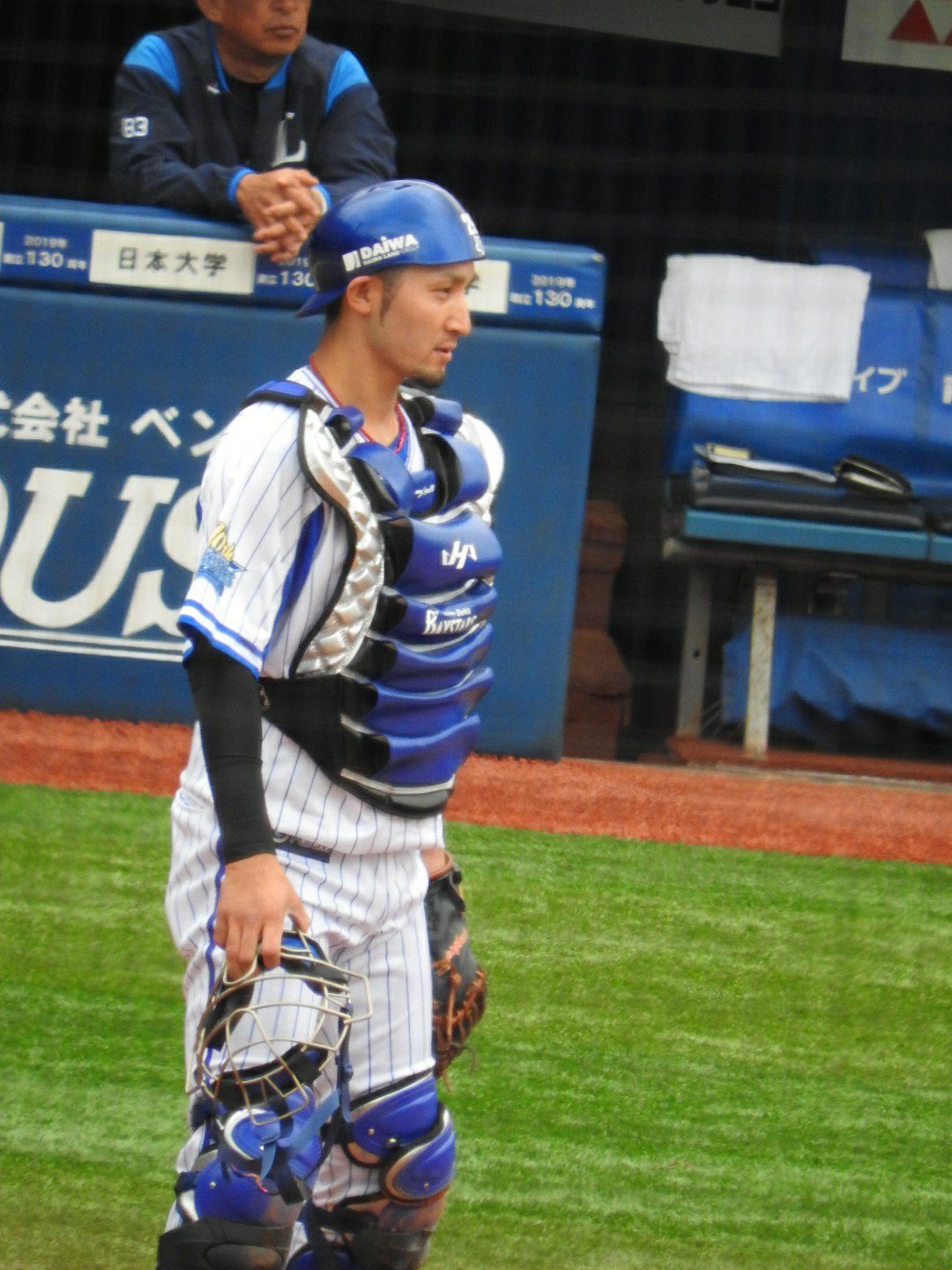
- Ito with the Yokohama DeNA Baystars.

Tohoku Rakuten Golden Eagles – No. 27
- Catcher
- Born: April 23, 1989 (age 37); Okazaki, Aichi, Japan
- Bats: Right Throws: Right

NPB debut
- September 13, 2008, for the Orix Buffaloes

NPB statistics (through 2025 season)
- Batting average: .235
- Home runs: 30
- Runs batted in: 262
- Stats at Baseball Reference

Teams
- Orix Buffaloes (2008–2018); Yokohama DeNA BayStars (2018–2025); Tohoku Rakuten Golden Eagles (2026–present)

Career highlights and awards
- Japan Series champion (2024); Pacific league Best Nine Award winner (2014); Pacific league Golden Glove Award winner (2014); 2× NPB All-Star (2013–2014)

Hikaru Ito (伊藤 光, Itō Hikaru; born April 23, 1989) is a Japanese professional baseball catcher for the Tohoku Rakuten Golden Eagles of Nippon Professional Baseball (NPB). He has previously played in NPB for the Orix Buffaloes and Yokohama DeNA BayStars.

== Amateur career ==
A native of Okazaki, he began playing baseball at the age of five due to the influence of his father. He played as a pitcher and infielder for the Okazaki Little League club during his elementary years. When he entered Tokai Junior High, he joined the East Nagoya Stars baseball club and changed his position to catcher. In his 2nd year in Meitoku Gijuku High School, he led his team in RBIs during the Kochi prefectural spring baseball tournament and was also selected to play in friendly matches with USA and Taiwan. His school also won the runner up in the Kochi summer tournament finals in his 3rd year. He hit 13 home runs in his entire high school career.

== Professional career ==
=== Orix Buffaloes ===
Ito was chosen by the Orix Buffaloes as their third round pick during the 2007 high school draft.

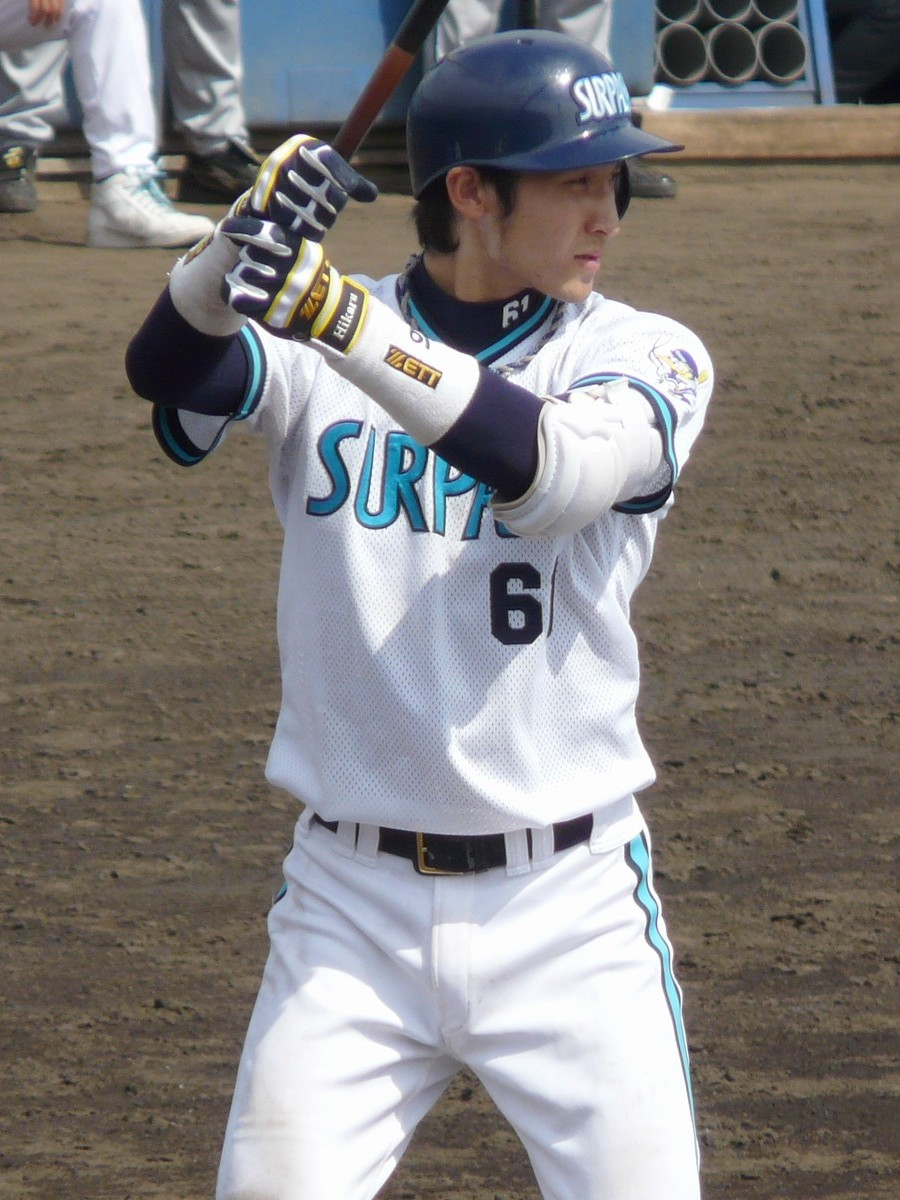
Maishima Stadium, August 2, 2008

==== 2008 ====
He spent his first year training to improve his skills as catcher in the team's Western League games. But due to his young age and lack of experience, he only batted at an average of .192 in 40 games with a strike-out rate of 0.25. Defense-wise, he had the greatest number of passed balls. Nevertheless, he had the most game appearances among the team's rookie catchers. He was finally given a chance at the first squad when he made his debut on the September 19 match against the Hokkaido Nippon-Ham Fighters.

Even though he didn't hit any home runs in any of his League games, he was able to hit two during inter-squad games.

==== 2009 ====
On the spring of his 2nd year, he underwent surgery to treat his herniated disc. Even though he only required 2 weeks of rest after surgery and aimed to return to play after 3 months, he was not given any plate appearances for the season. Also, because his left calf muscle suffered at the aftermath of his surgery, Manager Daijiro Oishi thought it best not to rush him into play.

==== 2010 ====
Upon being allowed to play in 2nd squad games after a year of absence, he was reported to have burst into tears when he made his first hit. He was given another chance to appear in two ichi-gun matches during the latter part of the season.

During postseason, he was assigned the jersey number 54, and his former number (61) was assigned to former major-leaguer Chan Ho Park who just joined the team at that time.

==== 2011 ====
With new Manager Akinobu Okada seeing his potential as the team's main catcher, Ito was assigned to the ichi-gun camp and eventually made his way to the team's starting line up.

Despite being demoted to ni-gun twice during his occasional slumps, he rose to the occasion when he teamed up with ace Chihiro Kaneko, and his starts gradually increased. And ever since he helped Yuki Nishi achieve his first official win and Hayato Terahara notch his first shutout victory in 3 years, he formed batteries with them in most of their games for the rest of the season.

He hit his first career home-run on the May 25 game versus the Swallows. His momentum was halted, however, when his right index finger was fractured in a collision at the home plate with the Saitama Seibu Lions' Takeya Nakamura during the September 11 match, and he was required to rest for the remainder of the season.

Even though he finished with a career-high of 66 games, his batting skills remained below par (.156 batting average, 0.36 KO rate). He did, however, top the team in fielding with a caught stealing percentage of .318. His jersey number was again changed to 22 during postseason.

==== 2012 ====
Throughout the season, he alternated with Fumihiro Suzuki and Toshio Saito as the team's starting catchers. On the April 8 game versus the Eagles, he batted a sacrifice fly to score a run, helped Hiroshi Kisanuki notch a 5-hit shutout win, to experience his first ever hero interview. Four days later, he was hit on the head by a full swing from Josh Whitesell's bat and was carried off the field on a stretcher and taken to a hospital in Chiba, where he was diagnosed with a contusion on the right side of his head.

On the offensive, he batted in 36 hits and 10 RBI, with an improved average of .205. Defense-wise, he was able to team up with most of Orix's pitchers in 66 game appearances. On their last regular season game on October 8, he led the younger Yuki Nishi to accomplish the highly coveted no-hit no-run against the SoftBank Hawks (3-0). The 76th no-hitter in NPB history and the 8th for Orix, the game was only one walk away to being a perfect game.

He and Tomotaka Sakaguchi were named Vice Chairmen in the Orix player's meeting during off season.

==== 2013 ====
With the retirement of mainstay catcher Fumihiro Suzuki and Takeshi Hidaka exercising his domestic free agency option, Itoh ultimately became the team's main catcher. With his goal to appear in at least 100 games as main catcher, he played from the season's opening series then steadily continued to deliver in the team's succeeding matches. It came as no surprise therefore when he received the fans' topmost votes among the Pacific League catchers in the All-Star ballot, and went on to experience his first All-Star game in July.

He more than doubled his appearances last season to a total of 137 games, breaking Hidaka's previous franchise record of 134 games in 2008. His hitting saw an improvement during the first half of the season (.300 average), but he went on a hitless slump for the entire August. He recovered in the next two months and batted even better at .330, making a season average of .285. He even managed to hit consecutive home runs on the October 6 & 7 games against the Chiba Lotte Marines.

In November, he participated in the 2013 Baseball Challenge, where Japan swept Chinese Taipei in the friendly three-game series.

==== 2014 ====
With the entry of former SoftBank catcher Katsuki Yamazaki, even though Ito appeared in the same number of games as the previous year, his plate appearances decreased. Nevertheless, he managed to surpass his previous record of RBI by 8 runs. He led the Pacific League in both offense and defense as a catcher, earning himself both Best Nine and Golden Glove awards. He helped Chihiro Kaneko achieve the lowest ERA among this year's NPB pitchers, and together, they were given the League's Battery Award via unanimous panel decision.

He was chosen as the player's chairman for 2015 during offseason, and participated in the 2014 Suzuki All-Star Series, a five-game friendly competition with a squad of US major leaguers.

=== Yokohama DeNA BayStars ===
A free agent after the 2018 season, Ito signed with the Yokohama DeNA BayStars, playing for the team from 2019 to 2025. With Yokohama, Ito won the 2024 Japan Series.

=== Tohoku Rakuten Golden Eagles ===
On November 18, 2025, Ito signed with the Tohoku Rakuten Golden Eagles of Nippon Professional Baseball.

== Playing style ==
His right arm can throw at a distance of 120 meters, while his 50-meter dash is clocked at 6.0 seconds. He's a balanced player in terms of speed, offense and defense. He also has a reputation for drawing out strengths in pitchers by using them to their advantage.
