= Bhulabhai Desai =

Indian independence activist and acclaimed lawyer

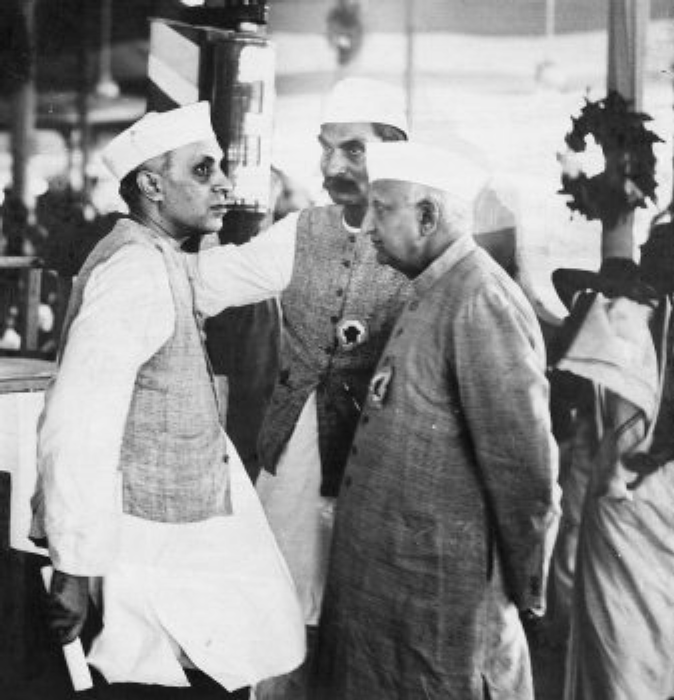
- Jawaharlal Nehru, Bhulabhai Desai and Babu Rajendra Prasad (Center) at the AICC Session, April 1939
- Born: 13 October 1877; Valsad
- Died: 6 May 1946 (aged 68)

Bhulabhai Desai (13 October 1877 – 6 May 1946) was an Indian independence activist and acclaimed lawyer. He is well-remembered for his defence of the three Indian National Army soldiers accused of treason during World War II, and for attempting to negotiate a secret power-sharing agreement with Liaquat Ali Khan of the Muslim League.

== Early life ==
Bhulabhai Desai was born in Valsad, Gujarat in an Brahmin family. Initially schooled by his maternal uncle, Bhulabhai further studied at the Avabai School in Valsad and the Bharda High School in Bombay, from where he matriculated in 1895, standing first in his school. He married Ichchhaben while still in school. They had one son, Dhirubhai, but Ichchhaben died of cancer in 1923. He then joined the Elphinstone College in Bombay from where he graduated in high standing in English literature and history. He won the Wordsworth Prize and a scholarship for standing first in History and Political Economy. He did his MA in English from the University of Bombay. Bhulabhai was appointed Professor of English and History in the Gujarat College, Ahmedabad. While teaching he also studied law. Desai enrolled as an advocate at the Bombay High Court in 1905, and became one of the city's and later the nation's leading lawyers.

== Political career ==
Bhulabhai began his political career with joining Annie Besant's All India Home Rule League. He had joined the Indian Liberal Party, supportive of British influences, but came out in opposition of the all-European Simon Commission formed in 1928 by the British to formulate constitutional reforms in India. His connection with the Indian National Congress began when he represented the farmers of Gujarat in the inquiry by the British Government following the Bardoli Satyagraha in 1928. The satyagraha was a campaign by the farmers of Gujarat protesting oppressive taxation policies in a time of famine, under the leadership of Sardar Vallabhbhai Patel. Bhulabhai formidably represented the farmers' case, and was important to the eventual success of the struggle.

Desai formally joined the Congress in 1930. Convinced about the effectiveness of boycott of foreign goods, he formed the Swadeshi Sabha and persuaded 80 textile mills to join in, with the aim of building a boycott by Indian companies of foreign goods. The Sabha was declared illegal and he was arrested in 1932 for his activities. While in jail, Bhulabhai Desai was constantly ill. On his release on health grounds, he went to Europe for treatment. When the Congress Working Committee was reorganised, at Sardar Vallabhbhai Patel's insistence Desai was included in the committee.

In November 1934, Desai was elected to the Central Legislative Assembly from Gujarat. The Government of India Act 1935, which allowed provincial autonomy, raised the question whether the Congress should participate in the legislatures. Bhulabhai among others supported Congress participation, pointing out the greater autonomy and political rights granted to Indians. When the Congress entered the Central Assembly, he was elected the leader of all elected Congressman, thus becoming the majority leader. He built much respect and standing by forcefully leading the first elected representation of the Congress.

At the onset of World War II, the Congress opposed the arbitrary inclusion of India and Indian soldiers in the war effort. Bhulabhai Desai considered it important to use the Central Assembly to clarify the Congress attitude to the world. Bhulabhai addressed the House on 19 November 1940, making a strong plea which read "...unless it is India's war, it is impossible that you will get India's support." Participating in the satyagraha initiated by Mohandas Gandhi, he was arrested on 10 December, under the Defense of India Act and sent to Yerwada Central Jail. He was released from prison in September 1941 on grounds of poor health, which also affected his participation in the Quit India movement.

== Desai-Liaquat pact ==
While Mohandas Gandhi and the entire Congress Working Committee had been arrested during the Quit India movement, from 1942 to 1945, Desai was one of few Congress leaders free. While pressing demands for the immediate release of political prisoners, Desai began secretive talks with Liaquat Ali Khan, the second-most important leader of the Muslim League. However this assertion has been seriously challenged by other eminent people like Sir Chiman Lal Setalwad who have stated that Gandhi had full knowledge of the ongoing negotiations. It was their intention to negotiate an agreement for a future coalition government, which would enable a united choice for Hindus and Muslims for the independent Government of India. In this deal, Liaquat gave up the demand for a separate Muslim state in turn for parity of Muslims-to-Hindus in the council of ministers. Conceding the League as the representative of Muslims and giving a minority community equal place with the majority Hindus, Desai attempted to construct an ideal Indian alliance that would hasten India's path for freedom while ending the Quit India struggle. While Desai was working without the knowledge of Gandhi, Patel, Jawaharlal Nehru or any other Congress leader, Khan had kept the deal a secret from his superior, Muhammad Ali Jinnah.

When a press report leaked the prospective deal in 1945, the respective parties were alarmed. While Desai presented full information to Gandhi, Jinnah and the League outrightly rejected any agreements, and Liaquat Ali Khan denied that such a pact was being negotiated. Desai's assertion that a deal had been reached was ridiculed by the League, while Congress leaders were angry at him for conducting such negotiations without informing them. Bhulabhai Desai would lead a major effort in March 1945 to get the House to defeat the unpopular war budget, but he had lost political standing in his own party owing to the fallout of the Desai-Liaquat pact. He was not given a ticket to contest elections for the Constituent Assembly of India on grounds of his ill-health, but also due to feelings in the Congress that Desai had been advancing his own power and popularity while the Congress leadership was imprisoned. This should be kept in mind that at that time many a proceedings of the Indian National Congress were shrouded in secrecy and people like Sir Chiman Lal Setalwad have time and again asserted that Gandhi had full knowledge of the Desai-Liaquat pact and was in fact the silent force behind the negotiations. It is also a matter worth note that when Desai was on his death bed, Gandhi went to meet him and did not speak a single word citing his "Maunvrata" (a fast wherein people do not speak for a designated period of time).

== INA soldiers trial ==
When three captured Indian National Army (INA) officers, Shahnawaz Khan, Prem Kumar Sahgal and Gurbaksh Singh Dhillon were put on trial for treason, the Congress formed a Defence committee composed of 17 advocates including Bhulabhai Desai. The court-martial hearing began in October 1945 at the Red Fort. Bhulabhai was the leading counsel for the defence. Undeterred by poor health, Bhulabhai made an emphatic and passionate argument in defence of the charged soldiers. He worked for three months at a stretch. He cited international law in his arguments, arguing that the accused were entitled to take up arms to gain independence for their country under the order of the Provisional Government which Subhas Bose had established and which had the recognition of a few sovereign governments, and that the Indian Penal Code did not apply to their case. The judge nevertheless pronounced the three officers guilty and sentenced them to transportation for life. The accused were however released and during the course of the trials reignited the Indian freedom struggle leading to complete independence in 1947.

== Death ==
Bhulabhai Desai died on 6 May 1946. His immense wealth led to the creation of the Bhulabhai Memorial Institute in Bombay.

== Legacy ==
M. C. Setalvad authored his biography, Bhulabhai Desai. Bhulabhai Desai Road in Mumbai is named after him.
