= Prem Sahgal =

British and Indian army officer (1917–1992)

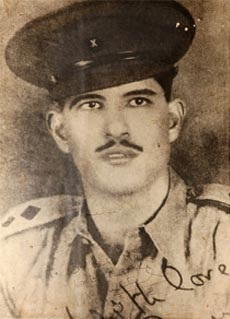
- Sahgal in 1940
- Born: 25 March 1917; Lahore, Punjab, British India (present-day Punjab, Pakistan)
- Died: 17 October 1992 (aged 75); India
- Spouse: Lakshmi Swaminathan
- Children: Subhashini Ali
- Military career
- Allegiance: British India; Azad Hind
- Conflicts: World War II; Malayan campaign

Lieutenant colonel Prem Kumar Sahgal (25 March 1917 – 17 October 1992) was an Indian Army officer in the British Indian Army. After becoming a Japanese prisoner of war, he served as an officer in the Indian National Army, which was led by Subhas Chandra Bose and had been set up by the Japanese to fight against British rule in India.

== Life ==
Sahgal was educated at the Central Model High School and Government College, Lahore.

In 1936, he passed the military entrance exam and went to the Indian Military Academy at Dehradun. He was commissioned as a second lieutenant on the Special List published on 1 February 1939 and was attached to the 2nd Battalion of the Argyll and Sutherland Highlanders, then stationed at Secunderabad. He joined that battalion on 24 February 1939 and remained there for a year. That battalion was posted to Singapore in August 1939, in anticipation of war, but Sahgal was transferred to the 1st Battalion, West Yorkshire Regiment, which remained in a peace station.

After one year of service, Sahgal took a one month leave and spent time with his family in Lahore. Upon his return, he was posted to the 5th Battalion of the 10th Baluch Regiment, stationed at Peshawar on the North West Frontier, relatively close to his family and far from the theatres of war. Shortly afterwards, on 30 April 1940, Sahgal was promoted to the rank of lieutenant. He volunteered to be transferred to the 2/10th Baluch Regiment as they were short of officers. In October 1940, he reported to the 2nd Battalion at Bareilly near Delhi, in the then United Provinces. That regiment sailed for Singapore on 28 October 1940 and landed there on 11 November 1940. By December 1941, Sahgal was promoted acting captain in the 2/10th Baluch Regiment of the British Indian Army and fought against Japanese forces in Malaya. He served with distinction before being made a prisoner of war in February 1942.

== Indian National Army ==
As a prisoner, Sahgal was invited to fight for Japan's proxy - the Indian National Army. He joined the Indian National Army (INA) of Subhas Chandra Bose and took up arms against his former colleagues in the British Indian Army. He served as the commander of the 2nd Division, led the 2nd Infantry Regiment at Popa against Messervy's 17th Indian Division during the latter half of the Burma Campaign before surrendering to the British forces. During his stint with the INA, Sahgal came into contact with Lakshmi Swaminathan, whom he later married.

After the INA disbanded, officers and soldiers of the INA were arrested. Major General Shah Nawaz Khan, Brigadier Habib ur Rehman of Panjeri (Bhimber) Colonel Prem Kumar, and Colonel Gurbaksh Singh Dhillon were tried in court. Upon the directive of Allama Mashriqi, the Khaksars made great efforts for their release, and their efforts did not go in vain. During a visit to the Khaksar Tehrik headquarters, Major General Shah Nawaz thanked Allama Mashriqi for obtaining their release. The general also thanked the Khaksars and stated, "We are highly grateful to the Khaksar Tehrik for their efforts in obtaining our release." ("Al-Islah" dated 11 January 1946)

After surrendering, Sahgal spent time in an Indian prison before being put on trial for treason along with three fellow officers. The trial was held in November 1946, by which time India was on the verge of gaining her independence. The stage was set for suitable atmospherics when the Red Fort in Delhi was named the venue for the trial, a choice without precedent in the annals of Indian law. Jawaharlal Nehru recognized the potential of the event and donned his lawyer's robes, after an interval of several decades, to appear as counsel for the defense. The trial duly became famous all over India in 1946 and are known in history books as the Indian National Army trials. The charge of treason was not upheld, but Sahgal was dismissed from the army.

== Personal life ==
In March 1947 at Lahore, Sahgal married Captain Lakshmi Swaminathan, daughter of Ammu Swaminathan. His wife had been the head of the women's wing of the Indian National Army, and they had worked closely together. Lakshmi had previously been married to P. K. N. Rao, a commercial pilot working with Tata Airlines. She had walked out of that marriage. but had never secured a divorce, having no grounds which were legally valid at that time. Nevertheless, Prem and Lakshmi walked into a registry office, failed to mention this matter there, and received a certificate of marriage. Since Lakshmi's husband wanted only to be rid of her, they never faced any legal problems.

The Sahgals have two daughters, Subhashini Ali and Anisa Puri. Subhashini Ali, formerly married to the film-maker Muzaffar Ali, is a communist women's activist and a leader of the All India Democratic Women's Association, the women's wing of the Communist Party of India (Marxist). According to Subhashini Ali, Prem Sahgal was an atheist, and believed passionately in communist ideology.
