= Gurbaksh Singh Dhillon =

Officer in the Indian National Army (1914–2006)

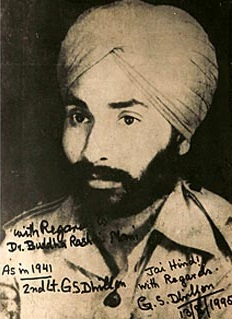
Gurbaksh Singh Dhillon in the 1940s

Gurbaksh Singh Dhillon (18 March 1914 – 6 February 2006) was an Indian military officer of the Indian National Army (INA). He faced charges of "waging war against His Majesty the King Emperor" due to his pivotal role in the Indian independence movement. For his contributions, he was awarded the Padma Bhushan, the third-highest civilian honour of the Republic of India.

== Recognition ==
Dhillon's contributions to India's freedom struggle were recognized with the Padma Bhushan award in 1998. Additionally, the Indian Postal Department issued a commemorative stamp in his honor in 1997.
