= Subhas Brigade =

Japanese-allied Indian National Army unit

The Subhas Brigade, or the 1st Guerrilla Regiment was a guerrilla forces unit of the Indian National Army (INA). The unit was formed in 1943 and unofficially referred to as Subhas Brigade after the Indian independence leader Subhas Chandra Bose, who at the time was also the supreme commander of the army. (Bose himself did not wish to have the brigade named for him, but the name was kept.) The unit was the first and major commitment of the second INA in the Imphal Offensive, and along with Azad, Gandhi and Nehru Brigade, the Army's contribution to the Imperial Japanese Army's U-go offensive.

The brigade was divided into three battalions under the command of Shah Nawaz Khan. By the beginning of January 1944, it had reached Rangoon in Burma, where two battalions remained to guard the border between Burma and India near Haka, while the third advanced into India across the Kaladan River. Elements of the brigade subsequently took part in the Battles of Imphal and Kohima, where they were forced to withdraw alongside the Japanese forces they supported. These battles marked the turning point in the Burma Campaign.

== Sources ==
- Mozammel, Md Muktadir Arif (2012). "Indian National Army". In Islam, Sirajul; Jamal, Ahmed A. (eds.). Banglapedia: National Encyclopedia of Bangladesh (Second ed.). Asiatic Society of Bangladesh.
- Getz, Marshall J., Subhas Chandra Bose: A Biography, 2002 (ISBN 0-7864-1265-8), quoted in a Stone & Stone review by Bill Stone.
