= Laxmi Indira Panda =

Indian revolutionary (b. 1930, d. 2008)

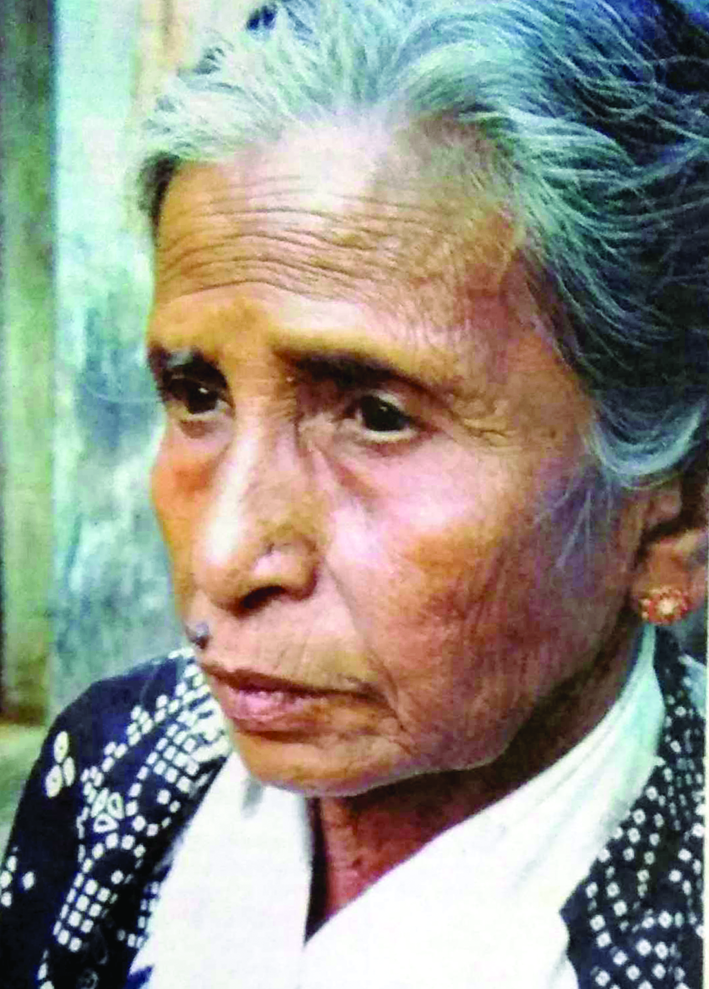
- Born: Laxmi Panda c. 1930 near Rangoon, Burma
- Died: October 7, 2008
- Organization: Indian National Army
- Movement: Azad Hind Government
- Spouse: Khageswar Panda (m.1951)
- Awards: Rashtriya Swantantra Sainik Samman (2008)

Captain Laxmi Indira Panda was an Indian revolutionary and one of the youngest members of Netaji Subash Chandra Bose's Indian National Army. Panda was the only Odia woman to serve in the INA.

Panda had joined Indian National Army (INA) in the Rani of Jhansi Regiment, when she was only 14 years old and fought against the British rule in India.

The Government of Odisha announced to install a statue at Jeypore in memory of Panda after her death in October 2008.

On October 25, 2008, she was conferred the Rashtriya Swantantra Sainik Samman, the highest title conferred on a freedom fighter in India.

She was working as a domestic help and living off the Odisha freedom fighters pension. She was fighting for her freedom fighters pension. Her grandson spread the news to newspapers and then after that she got her freedom fighters pension and was awarded the Rashtriya Sainik Samman and met the president Prathiba Patil.

== Death ==
Panda died on October 7, 2008, at the AIIMS Delhi after a prolonged illness. She was cremated with full state honours and a guard of honour was also given on behalf the Orissa Police.
