= Gandhi Brigade (regiment) =

Unit of the Indian National Army

The Gandhi Brigade or the 1st Guerrilla Regiment of the Indian National Army formed a part of the First INA and later formed a part of the 1st Division after its revival under Subhas Chandra Bose.

Formed in September 1942, named after the Indian freedom fighter Mahatma Gandhi, the unit came under the command of Col Inayat Kiani and consisted of two infantry battalions, 1st battalion was commanded by Captain Malik Munawar Khan Awan. It participated in the INA's Imphal Campaign where Munawar initially routed the 16th Indian Infantry Division and caused heavy casualties through frequent ambushes. It later came under the command of Shah Nawaz Khan in 1944 and fought around the Irrawaddy, against the successful Allied Burma Campaign.

== See also ==
- Hindustan Field Force
- Battle of Irrawaddy
