= Rasammah Bhupalan =

Malaysian freedom fighter, teacher and social activist (1927–2025)

Dato' Rasammah Bhupalan
- இராசம்மா பூபாலன்
- Born: 1 May 1927
- Died: 13 May 2025 (aged 98); Kuala Lumpur, Malaysia

Rasammah Bhupalan (Tamil: இராசம்மா பூபாலன், 1 May 1927 – 13 May 2025), also known as Rasammah Naomi Navarednam or F. R. Bhupalan, was a Malaysian independence and social activist of Tamil origin.

Bhupalan championed causes such as the anti-drug abuse movement, women's rights, education, and social justice causes.

== Pre-independence ==
Rasammah was one of the earliest women involved in the fight for Malaysian (then Malaya) independence. She joined the Rani of Jhansi Regiment, the women's wing of the Indian National Army, to fight the British. She served in Burma during World War II.

== Women's rights ==
As founder president of the Women Teachers' Union, she fought for equal pay for women teachers and tried to bring disparate teachers' unions under an umbrella.

The former school principal was the first Asian representative of the World Confederation of Organisations of the Teaching Profession for two successive terms. She was also very active in the National Council of Women's Organisations (NCWO) and Pemadam.

== Death ==
Bhupalan died on 13 May 2025, at the age of 98.

== Recognition ==
Bhupalan was a teacher in the Methodist Boys School Kuala Lumpur (MBSSKL) from 1959 to 1964 and was the principal of Methodist Girls School Kuala Lumpur (MGSKL) for 14 years from 1969 until she retired in 1982. On 21 November 2006, a book entitled Footprints on The Sands of Time, Rasammah Bhupalan: A Life of Purpose authored by Aruna Gopinath was launched by Culture, Arts and Tourism Minister Datuk Rais Yatim. On 11 November 2007, Bhupalan was among the few veteran teachers who were honored at MBSSKL's 110th Anniversary Celebration Dinner. The dinner was specially organized to honour all the former and current teachers of the school.

The biography, published with the support of the National Archives, the ministry and NCWO, is about the life of Rasammah seen in a historical context.

== See also ==
- Janaky Athi Nahappan
- Lakshmi Sahgal

== Sources ==
- Ministry in search of remarkable Malaysians, The Star, 22 November 2006
- Mothers of substance, The Star, 20 August 2007.
- They dared to take up public office, The Star, 20 August 2007.
