= Peter Fay =

Peter Fay may refer to:

- Peter T. Fay, (1929–2021), American lawyer and judge
- Peter W. Fay (1924–2004), professor and historian focusing on India and China
