= The Springing Tiger =

- Cover of the first edition
- Author: Hugh Toye
- Language: English
- Genre: History (Military)
- Publisher: Cassell
- Publication date: 1959
- Publication place: United Kingdom
- Media type: Print

The Springing Tiger is a historical account of the Indian National Army published in 1959 by Col Hugh Toye. The book was published in London by Cassell Publishers, and is considered one of the first Sympathetic Western accounts of the army.

Toye worked as an intelligence officer in World War II in Burma, and was tasked with interrogating captured soldiers of the INA by the CSDIC(I). The book is provided with a foreword by Phillip Mason, who in 1946 was the Secretary of the War department in India.

The book describes in detail the formation of the INA under the auspices of the F Kikan of Japanese intelligence through the collapse and subsequent revival of the army under Subhas Chandra Bose, its role in the Battles of Imphal and Kohima and the subsequent collapse in the face of Allied Burmese offensive before ending with the alleged death of Subhas Chandra Bose.
