= Jaganath Rao Bhonsle =

Indian Army general and politician (1906–1963)

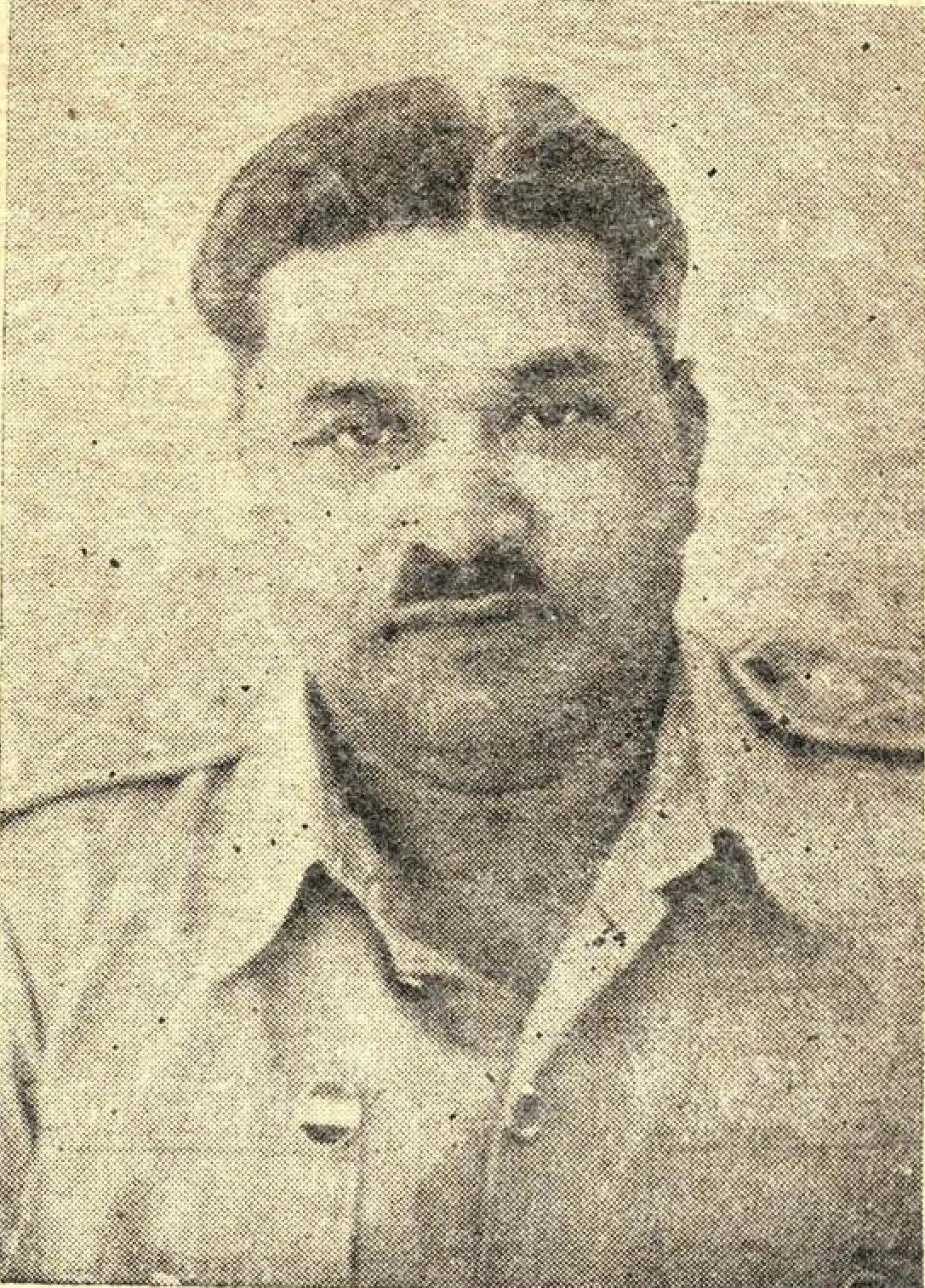

Chief of Staff of the Indian National Army
- In office 1943-1945
- Leader: Subhas Chandra Bose

Member of Parliament, Lok Sabha from Ratnagiri North
- In office 1952–1963
- Prime Minister: Jawaharlal Nehru

Personal details
- Born: April 20, 1906 Tiroda, Bombay Presidency, British Raj (Now Maharastra, India)
- Died: 14, May 1963; Saiska Alwar, Rajasthan, India
- Party: Indian National Congress

Military service
- Allegiance: British Raj (1926–1941); Free India (1941–1945)
- Years of service: 1926–1945
- Rank: Major General
- Unit: 5th Mahratta Light Infantry (1929–1941); Hindustan Field Force (1942–1943); Indian National Army (1943–1945)
- Battles/wars: World War II

Major General Jaganath Rao Bhonsle, also known as Jagannathrao Krishnarao Bhonsle (20 April 1906 – 14 May 1963) was an Indian military officer, independence activist, and politician. As a member of the Indian National Army, Bhonsle served as the minister for armed forces in the Azad Hind. After the war, he was a minister and MP in India after independence.

Bhonsle was born in the village of Tiroda in Maharashtra, then part of the Bombay Presidency of the British Raj, and was a member of the Tirodkar Bhonsle royal family. He graduated from the Prince of Wales Royal Indian Military College at Dehradun in 1926 and then went to the Royal Military College Sandhurst, where on 2 February 1928 he was commissioned as a second lieutenant. He then spent a year attached to a British Army regiment in India before posting to his permanent British Indian Army unit on 12 April 1929, which was the 5th Royal Battalion of 5th Mahratta Light Infantry. He was promoted to lieutenant on 2 May 1930, and to captain on 2 February 1937. He fought at the Battle of Singapore and was taken as a prisoner of war after the Fall of Singapore.

He was one of the first volunteers to the First Indian National Army led by Mohan Singh, where he was appointed as commander of the Hindustan Field Force. After this army collapsed due to disagreements with the Japanese, the Indian Independence League placed the remains of it under Mohammed Zaman Kiani as Army Commander and Bhonsle as Director of the Military Bureau, which was in charge of the general policy and finances of the INA. After the formation of the second Indian National Army in 1943, led by Subhas Chandra Bose, Bhonsle became chief of staff and served in this position until the end of the war. When Bose flew to Tokyo in August 1945, Bhonsle was left in charge of the INA in Bangkok, where he was captured by British forces. After the fall of Japan in 1945, Bhonsle returned to Bombay, and founded the Indian Ex-Services Organisation, an organisation for Indian veterans of the World Wars. He would serve as its president until he was elected to the Lok Sabha in 1951.

Following Indian independence in 1947, Bhonsle was appointed minister for rehabilitation by Prime Minister Jawaharlal Nehru, helping Hindu immigrants from the newly-founded Pakistan find life in India. Working for the rehabilitation of the Sindhi migrant community, he was honoured by the Sindhi community and thanked for his work in an open letter. Bhonsle was also elected as Member of Parliament with a 40,940-vote landslide in the first Lok Sabha election, serving the Ratnagiri North electoral district of Bombay. He was the main proponent of the National Service Scheme, although he never lived to see it, for he would die 6 years before its establishment in 1969.
