= Azad Hind Dal =

The Azad Hind Dal was a branch of the Indian Independence League that was formed during World War II to take administrative control of the Indian territories to fall to the Indian National Army starting with the latter's Imphal campaign. The branch was created by Subhas Chandra Bose to replace the Indian Civil Service in areas of British India, and is also thought to have been the nascent concept of a one-party political, bureaucratic and civil administrative system similar to that of the anti-fascist Soviet Union or the Fascist states of the time. During the brief period that Azad Hind was in possession of small Indian territories around Imphal and Kohima during the U-Go offensive between April and May 1944, parties of the Azad Hind Dal were sent along with the INA contingents to take administrative charge and rehabilitation of these areas.
