= Nehru Brigade =

Unit of the Indian National Army

The Nehru Brigade or 4th Guerrilla Regiment was a guerrilla forces unit of the Indian National Army (INA), that formed a part of the First INA and later part of the 1st Division after the INA's revival under Subhas Chandra Bose. Subhas Bose named the regiment after Pandit Jawaharlal Nehru, the 1st Prime Minister of India.

The unit did not participate in the INA's Imphal campaign, and was later transferred to the command of Lt. Col. Gurubaksh Singh Dhillon in 1944. It fought against the Commonwealth forces during the Irrawaddy crossing and later in around Popa Hill.
