= CSDIC(I) =

The Combined Services Detailed Interrogation Centre (India), or CSDIC (I) for short, was the Indian branch of the CSDIC, established during World War II. Established along with the parent section at the start of hostilities in Europe, the branch developed as an important tool for interrogation of enemy troops and informant from November 1942, when the first information emerged of the nascent Indian National Army. The organisation formed a part of the Jiffs campaign, and was initially tasked with identifying Indian troops at risk of defecting to the INA. By the end of the war its task had evolved into interrogating INA soldiers captured in Burma, Malaya and Europe, interrogating them regardless of rank and identifying soldiers as white grey or black on the basis of their commitment to Subhas Chandra Bose and Azad Hind. The classifications were to be important in rehabilitating INA soldiers into the British-Indian Army. Col. Hugh Toye, who worked with the unit, later went on to write the first substantive history on the INA in his book 1959 book The Springing Tiger.

CSDIC(I) is known to have had at least two sections: X Section in Italy and Z Section in the UK, at 49 St George's Drive, Pimlico, London SW1. These two sections were closed on 30 November 1945.

== See also ==
- Combined Services Detailed Interrogation Centre
- Indian National Army
- Bahadur Group
- Red Fort Trials
- Colonel Hugh Toye
