= Hindustan Field Force =

Regiment of Indian National Army

The Hindustan Field Force was the first operational regiment of the Indian National Army that was formed in September 1942 under the first INA. Under the command of J.K. Bhonsle, the unit was formed at Singapore and comprised three battalions derived from troops of the 17th Dogra Regiment, Garhwal Rifles and the 14th Punjab Regiment (now part of the Pakistan Army) and had a strength of nearly 2000 troops.

The unit was dissolved after the collapse of the first INA. After the revival under Subhas Chandra Bose, the troops of the Hindustan Field Force formed the nucleus of the INA's 2nd division as the 1st Infantry regiment and ceded men to the 5th Guerrilla regiment to form the 2nd Infantry regiment which later fought in the Battle of Irrawaddy and Battle of Meiktila under Prem Kumar Sahgal.
