= M. Bala Subramanion =

Singaporean postmaster-general and community leader (1917–2021)

- மு. பாலா சுப்பிரமணியன்
- Born: 5 March 1917; Singapore
- Died: 3 February 2021 (aged 103); Singapore
- Occupations: Civil service; Postmaster-General
- Known for: Singapore's first Asian Postmaster-General
- Awards: Pingat Pentadbiran Awam Gold Medal (1965)

Murugasu Bala Subramanion PPA (Tamil: மு. பாலா சுப்பிரமணியன்; 5 March 1917 – 3 February 2021) was a Singaporean civil servant who was the country's first Asian postmaster-general. He was also an Indian community leader who was a member of community groups including Singapore Indian Association, Singapore Indian Education Trust and Singapore Indian Fine Arts Society. He was a recipient of Singapore's Pingat Pentadbiran Awam gold medal, for services in public administration in 1965.

== Early life ==
Subramanion was born on 5 March 1917 in Singapore to Rajambal and K. Murugasu. His father had immigrated to what was then the Federated Malay States from Kumbakonam in the Thanjavur district of South India (modern day Tamil Nadu), and had become a trader and salesman between Malaya and Singapore. His mother was from Kajang, a town in Selangor, in British Malaya. He graduated from the Singapore English School finishing his Senior Cambridge exams in 1934 and completed his London Chamber of Commerce exams in 1935. In addition to being exposed to literature, he was a member of the school's hockey, cricket, and football teams.

== Career ==
=== Postal service ===
Subramanion joined the Postal Services as a probationary clerk with what was then the Colonial Postal Services Department in 1936. He was sent on a two-year scholarship to Great Britain to study the postal system after World War II. He stayed to work in Great Britain and returned to Singapore in 1955 to become the assistant comptroller with the postal department. He was the country's first local comptroller of post in 1957, and the first Asian postmaster-general in 1967. He held the position until his retirement in 1971. One of his notable work efforts was during the country's separation from Malaysia when he was responsible for moving the postal headquarters for Singapore related postal and financial services from Kuala Lumpur to Singapore over a period of six months. In response to the 1964 race riots in Singapore, Subramanion had also launched a philately series, Masks and Dances Definitives, in 1968, showcasing traditional arts and performances of the Malay, Chinese, and Indian communities. During this time, he was also responsible for the management of the Post Office Savings Bank (POSB) and was the chairman of the Savings Bank Advisory Committee which led actions to revive the POSB which was facing declining usage. The committee was chartered with actions to promote domestic savings through POSB to provide the government with a non-inflationary source of funds for national development. Series of changes were instituted including organization of savings contests to incentivize usage of the postal bank's services. During the time between 1966 and 1969, the number of new accounts opened increased from 10,596 to 174,506 with deposits totaling S$57.7 million in 1969.

=== Other works ===
As a leader within the Indian Singaporean community, Subramanion was a member of the management committees of the Singapore Indian Education Trust and the Singapore Indian Fine Arts Society. He was also a founding member of the Singapore Indian Association and had served as the organization's President and later as a trustee. After his retirement, a group of his friends called Bala Wallas, or disciples of Bala, would meet him and hear his views.

Subramanion worked with community and union leader G. Kandasamy in the reorganization of the Tamils Representative Council in the 1980s. He was a chairman of the council's education committee and had focused his efforts on advancement of Tamil language in schools in Singapore. He was also an active member of the Singaporean Hindu community including supporting with the fund collection for the Sri Sivan Temple and Sri Srinivasa Perumal Temple. He was a member of the Hindu Advisory Board, which advised the Singaporean government on endowments and religious customs. His services to the community were recognized at the 50th anniversary of the Hindu Endowments Board in 2019.

Subramanion's biography, Singapore, My Country, was published in 2016. The book was released by then-deputy prime minister Tharman Shanmugaratnam at the Fullerton Hotel Singapore, the site of the old General Post Office, where he had spent 35 years of his professional career.

== Awards ==
Subramanion was a recipient of Singapore's Pingat Pentadbiran Awam gold medal in 1965 for his services in public administration, which he received from the country's first president, Yusof Ishak.

== Personal life ==
Subramanion met his future wife, Sumitra, a doctor practising in Malaysia, in 1962 and they were married in 1966. The couple went on to have a daughter and a son. Their son died in 2000, aged 27. Subramanion was noted to be a reader of poetry, including the works of Persian poet Omar Khayyam. Subramanion died on 3 February 2021 at his house in Siglap. A centenarian, he was aged 103, twenty eight days short from his 104th birthday.

== Books ==
- Sengupta, Nilanjana (2016). Singapore, My Country: Biography of M. Bala Subramanion. Singapore: World Scientific. ISBN 978-981-314-131-5.
