= Indian National Army =

Army of Indian POWs taken Japan in WW2 and enlisting civilians

- Azad Hind Fauj
- Insignia of the INA
- Active: July 1943 – September 1945
- Country: Azad Hind (puppet state of Empire of Japan)
- Allegiance: Empire of Japan
- Role: Guerrilla, infantry, special operations
- Size: ~43,000 Soldiers: Gandhi Brigade, Nehru Brigade, Azad Brigade, Subhas Brigade, Rani of Jhansi regiment
- Mottos: Ittefaq, Itmad aur Qurbani (Hindustani: Concord, Faith and Sacrifice)
- March: Qadam Qadam Badhaye Ja
- Engagements: World War II: Burma Campaign; Battle of Ngakyedauk; Battle of Imphal; Battle of Pokoku; Battle of Central Burma

Commanders
- Commander-in-Chief: Subhas Chandra Bose (1943–1945); First Indian National Army: Mohan Singh (1942)
- Chief of Staff: Jaganath Rao Bhonsle
- Notable commanders: Prem Sahgal; Gurbaksh Singh Dhillon; Shah Nawaz Khan

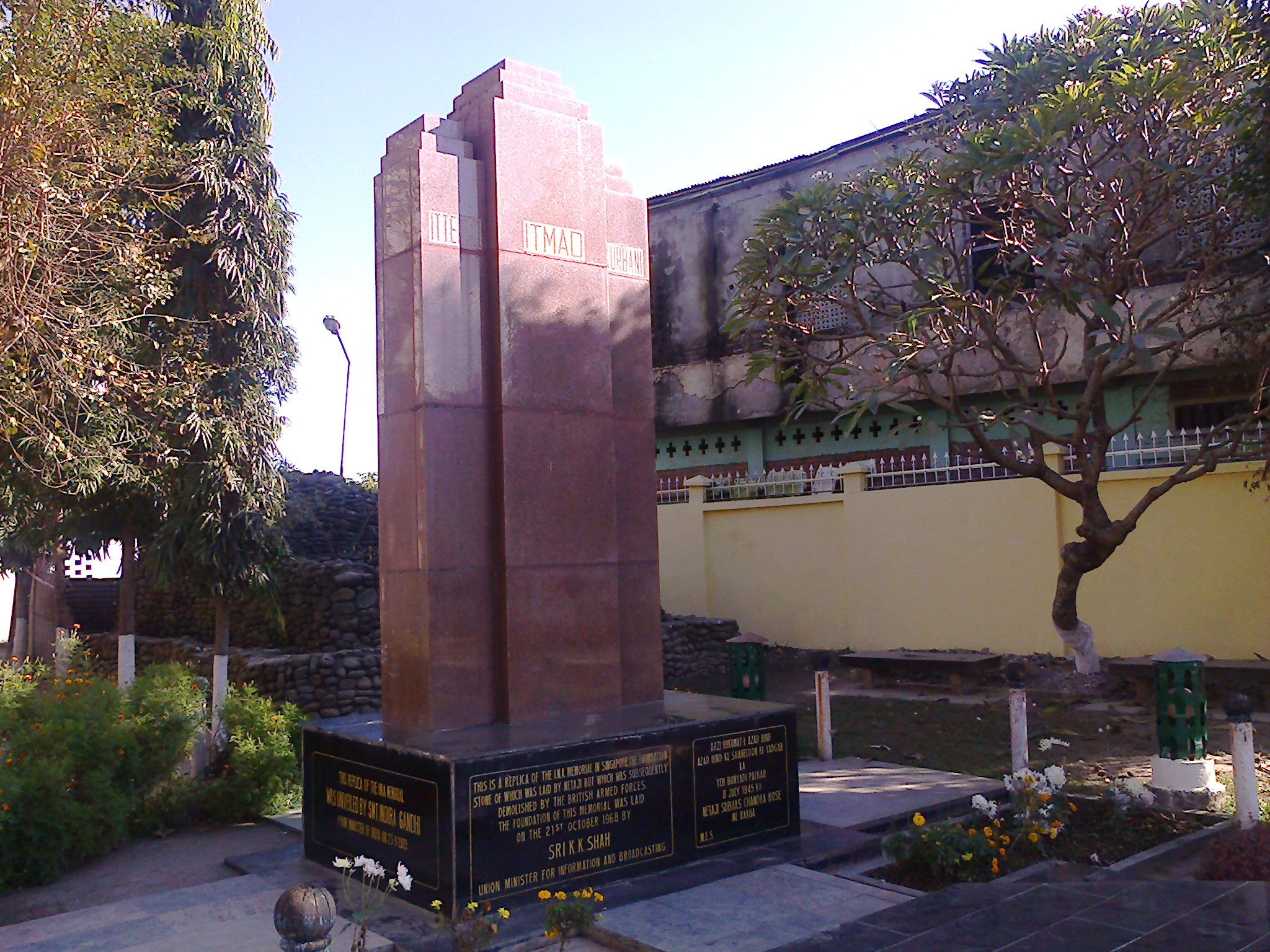
The INA Martyrs' Memorial Complex in Moirang, Manipur, where in April 1944 the Second Indian National Army opened its first headquarters on Indian soil.

The Indian National Army (INA, sometimes Second INA; Azad Hind Fauj /ˈɑːzɑːð ˈhinð ˈfɔːdʒ/; lit. 'Free Indian Army') was a Japanese-allied and -supported armed force constituted in Southeast Asia during World War II and led by Indian anti-colonial nationalist Subhas Chandra Bose. It consisted primarily of British Indian Army POWs taken by Japan. Indian civilians in the region were also enlisted, with around 18,000 joining. The INA aimed to liberate India from British rule. After winning Japanese assent for its goal, the INA furnished support to the Japanese Army. The Japanese and INA forces invaded India from Rangoon in 1944, and Bose's nominal Provisional Government of Azad Hind declared war on Britain. Losses inflicted by the British in the Battle of Imphal in Manipur caused the invasion to be halted. A long and exhausting withdrawal, accompanied by a lack of supplies, malnutrition, and death, ensued, some victorious soldiers in the Indian Army not taking INA battlefield surrender kindly. The remaining INA was driven down the Malay Peninsula and surrendered to Allied forces in August 1945.

Major Iwaichi Fujiwara and Captain Mohan Singh had founded an earlier incarnation of the INA in 1942. However, Mohan Singh refused to align with the Japanese, leading to his arrest and the First INA's disbandment. After Subhas Chandra Bose arrived in Southeast Asia from Nazi Germany in May 1943, he refounded the INA with significant recruitment from Indian civilian communities in Malaya and Singapore.

Subhas Bose had both drive and charisma—promoting Indian slogans, such as "Jai Hind," which became highly popular—and the INA under Bose was a model of diversity by region, ethnicity, religion, and gender. Bose's impassioned speeches may have been a factor in the POWs and civilians joining the INA. Bitterness at their discriminatory treatment by the British, and a sense of abandonment by the British after the Fall of Singapore may have been factors. The thousands of Indian POWs and civilians who did not join being shipped to distant Japanese labour camps may have been another factor. Around 12,000 POWs and 100,000 Indian civilians were used as forced labourers by the Japanese. The INA followed Japanese military strategy but had its own military law and police. Although the INA has been described as a collaborationist force, its battlefield performance was poor, and its formation did not constitute a legitimate mutiny. The INA did not oppose Japanese Fascism, nor protest Japanese war crimes, such as sexual slavery, that occurred amongst its midst.

After the INA's initial formation in 1942, there was concern in the British Indian Army that further Indian troops would defect. This led to a reporting ban and a propaganda campaign called "Jiffs" to preserve the loyalty of the Sepoy. The British Raj, never seriously threatened by the INA, charged 300 INA officers with treason in the INA trials, but eventually backtracked in the face of opposition by the Indian National Congress. These trials became a galvanising point in the Indian Independence movement for the Congress. A number of people associated with the INA during the war later went on to hold important roles in public life in India as well as in other countries in Southeast Asia, most notably Lakshmi Sehgal in India, and John Thivy and Janaki Athinahappan in Malaya.

== First INA ==
=== Free India Legion ===
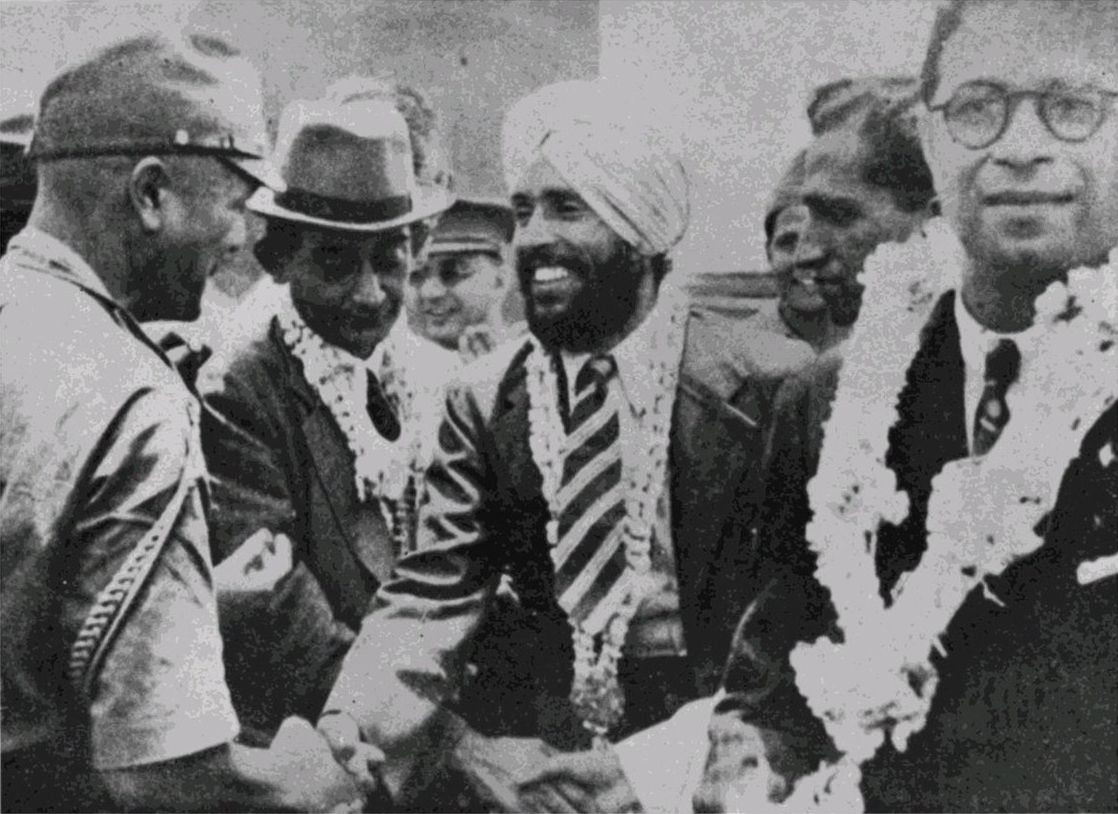
Major Iwaichi Fujiwara greets Mohan Singh. Circa April 1942.

Before the start of World War II, Japan and South-East Asia were major refuges for exiled Indian nationalists. Meanwhile, Japan had sent intelligence missions, notably under Maj. Iwaichi Fujiwara, into South Asia to gather support from the Malayan sultans, overseas Chinese, the Burmese resistance and the Indian independence movement. The Minami Kikan successfully recruited Burmese nationalists, while the F Kikan was successful in establishing contacts with Indian nationalists in exile in Thailand and Malaya. Fujiwara, later self-described as "Lawrence of the Second Indian National Army" (after Lawrence of Arabia) is said to have been a man committed to the values which his office was supposed to convey to the expatriate nationalist leaders, and found acceptance among them. His initial contact was with Giani Pritam Singh and the Thai-Bharat Cultural Lodge. At the outbreak of World War II in South-East Asia, 70,000 Indian troops (mostly Sikhs) were stationed in Malaya. In Japan's spectacular Malayan Campaign many Indian prisoners-of-war were captured, including nearly 45,000 after the fall of Singapore alone. The conditions of service within the British-Indian Army and the social conditions in Malaya had led to dissension among these troops. From these prisoners, the First Indian National Army was formed under Mohan Singh. Singh was an officer in the British-Indian Army who was captured early in the Malayan campaign. His nationalist sympathies found an ally in Fujiwara and he received considerable Japanese aid and support. Ethnic Indians in Southeast Asia also supported the cause of Indian independence and had formed local leagues in Malaya before the war. These came together with encouragement from Japan after the occupation, forming the Indian Independence League (IIL).

Although there were a number of prominent local Indians working in the IIL, the overall leadership came to rest with Rash Behari Bose, an Indian revolutionary who had lived in self-exile in Japan since World War I. The League and INA leadership decided that the INA was to be subordinate to the IIL. A working council – composed of prominent members of the League and the INA leaders – was to decide on decisions to send the INA to war. The Indian leaders feared that they would appear to be Japanese puppets, so a decision was taken that the INA would go to battle only when the Indian National Congress called it to do so. Assurances of non-interference— later termed the Bidadary resolutions— were demanded of Japan; these would have amounted to a treaty with an independent government. In this time, F. Kikan had been replaced by the Iwakuro Kikan (or I Kikan) headed by Hideo Iwakuro. Iwakuro's working relationship with the league was more tenuous. Japan did not immediately agree to the demands arising from the Bidadary resolutions. Differences also existed between Rash Behari and the League, not least because Rash Behari had lived in Japan for the considerable time and had a Japanese wife and a son in the Imperial Japanese Army. On the other hand, Mohan Singh expected military strategy and decisions to be autonomous decisions for the INA, independent of the league.

In November and December 1942, concern about Japan's intentions towards the INA led to disagreement between the INA and the League on the one hand and the Japanese on the other. The INA leadership resigned along with that of the League (except Rash Behari). The unit was dissolved by Mohan Singh in December 1942, and he ordered the troops of the INA to return to PoW camps. Mohan Singh was expected to be shot.

Between December 1942 and February 1943, Rash Behari struggled to hold the INA together. On 15 February 1943, the army itself was put under the command of Lt. Col. M.Z. Kiani. A policy forming body was formed with Lt. Col J.R. Bhonsle (Director of the Military Bureau) in charge and clearly placed under the authority of the IIL. Under Bhonsle served Lt. Col. Shah Nawaz Khan as Chief of General Staff, Major P.K. Sahgal as Military Secretary, Major Habib ur Rahman as commandant of the Officers' Training School and Lt. Col. A.C. Chatterji (later Major A.D. Jahangir) as head of enlightenment and culture.

== Second INA ==
=== Subhas Chandra Bose ===
Subhas Chandra Bose was the ideal person to lead a rebel army into India came from the very beginning of F Kikan's work with captured Indian soldiers. Mohan Singh himself, soon after his first meeting with Fujiwara, had suggested that Bose was the right leader of a nationalist Indian army. A number of the officers and troops – including some who now returned to prisoner-of-war camps and some who had not volunteered in the first place – made it known that they would be willing to join the INA only if it was led by Subhas Bose. Bose was a nationalist. He had joined the Gandhian movement after resigning from a prestigious post in the Indian Civil Service in 1922, quickly rising in the Congress and being incarcerated repeatedly by the Raj. By late 1920s he and Nehru were considered the future leaders of the Congress. In the late 1920s, he was amongst the first Congress leaders to call for complete independence from Britain (Purna Swaraj), rather than the previous Congress objective of India becoming a British dominion. In Bengal, he was repeatedly accused by Raj officials of working with the revolutionary movement. Under his leadership, the Congress youth group in Bengal was organised into a quasi-military organisation called the Bengal Volunteers. Bose deplored Gandhi's pacifism; Gandhi disagreed with Bose's confrontations with the Raj. The Congress's working committee, including Nehru, was predominantly loyal to Gandhi. While openly disagreeing with Gandhi, Bose won the presidency of Indian National Congress twice in the 1930s. His second victory came despite opposition from Gandhi. He defeated Gandhi's favoured candidate, Bhogaraju Pattabhi Sitaramayya, in the popular vote, but the entire working committee resigned and refused to work with Bose. Bose resigned from the Congress presidency and founded his own faction within the Congress, the All India Forward Bloc.

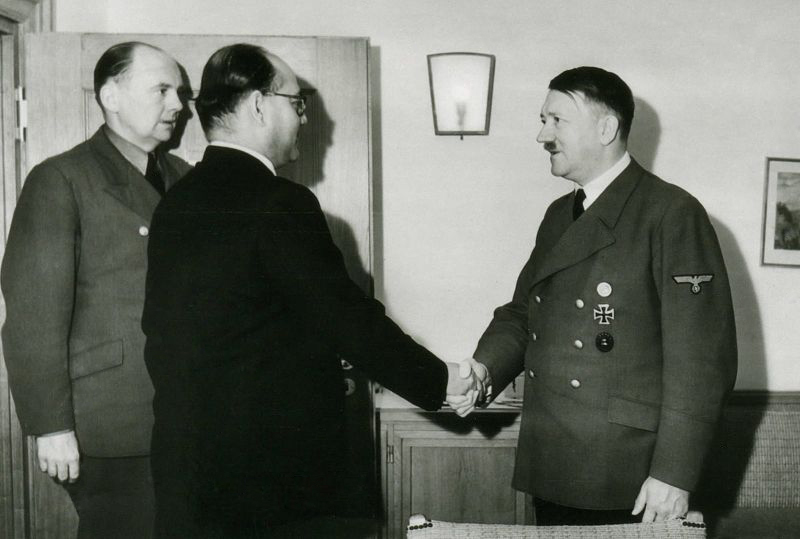
Bose meeting with Adolf Hitler in East Prussia, May 1942

At the start of World War II, Bose was placed under house arrest by the Raj. He escaped in disguise and made his way through Afghanistan and Central -Asia. He came first to the Soviet Union and then to Germany, reaching Berlin on 2 April 1941. There he sought to raise an army of Indian soldiers from prisoners of war captured by Germany, forming the Free India Legion and the Azad Hind Radio. The Japanese ambassador, Oshima Hiroshi, kept Tokyo informed of these developments. From the very start of the war, the Japanese intelligence services noted from speaking to captured Indian soldiers that Bose was held in extremely high regard as a nationalist and was considered by Indian soldiers to be the right person to be leading a rebel army.

In a series of meetings between the INA leaders and the Japanese in 1943, it was decided to cede the leadership of the IIL and the INA to Bose. In January 1943, the Japanese invited Bose to lead the Indian nationalist movement in East Asia. He accepted and left Germany on 8 February. After a three-month journey by submarine and a short stop in Singapore, he reached Tokyo on 11 May 1943. In Tokyo, he met Hideki Tojo, the Japanese prime minister, and the Japanese High Command. He then arrived in Singapore in July 1943, where he made a number of radio broadcasts to Indians in Southeast Asia exhorting them to join in the fight for India's independence.

=== Revival ===
On 4 July 1943 two days after reaching Singapore, Bose assumed the leadership of the IIL and the Second Indian National Army in a ceremony at Cathay Building. Bose's influence was notable. His appeal re-invigorated the INA, which had previously consisted mainly of prisoners of war: it also attracted Indian expatriates in South Asia. He famously proclaimed that Give me blood! I will give you freedom

"Local civilians joined the INA, doubling its strength. They included barristers, traders and plantation workers, as well as Khudabadi Sindhi Swarankars who were working as shop keepers; many had no military experience." Carl Vadivella Belle estimates under Bose's dynamic appeal, membership of the IIL peaked at 350,000, while almost 100,000 local Indians in South-east Asia volunteered to join the INA, with the army ultimately reaching a force of 50,000. Hugh Toye— a British Intelligence officer and author of a 1959 history of the army called The Springing Tiger— and American historian Peter W. Fay (author of a 1993 history called The Forgotten Army) have reached similar estimates of troop strength. The first INA is considered to have comprised about 40,000 troops, of whom about 4,000 withdrew when it was disbanded in December 1942. The Second INA started with 12,000 troops. Further recruitment of former Indian Army personnel added about 8,000–10,000. About 18,000 Indian civilians also enlisted during this time. Belle estimates almost 20,000 were local Malayan Indians, while another 20,000 were ex-British-Indian Army members who volunteered for the INA.

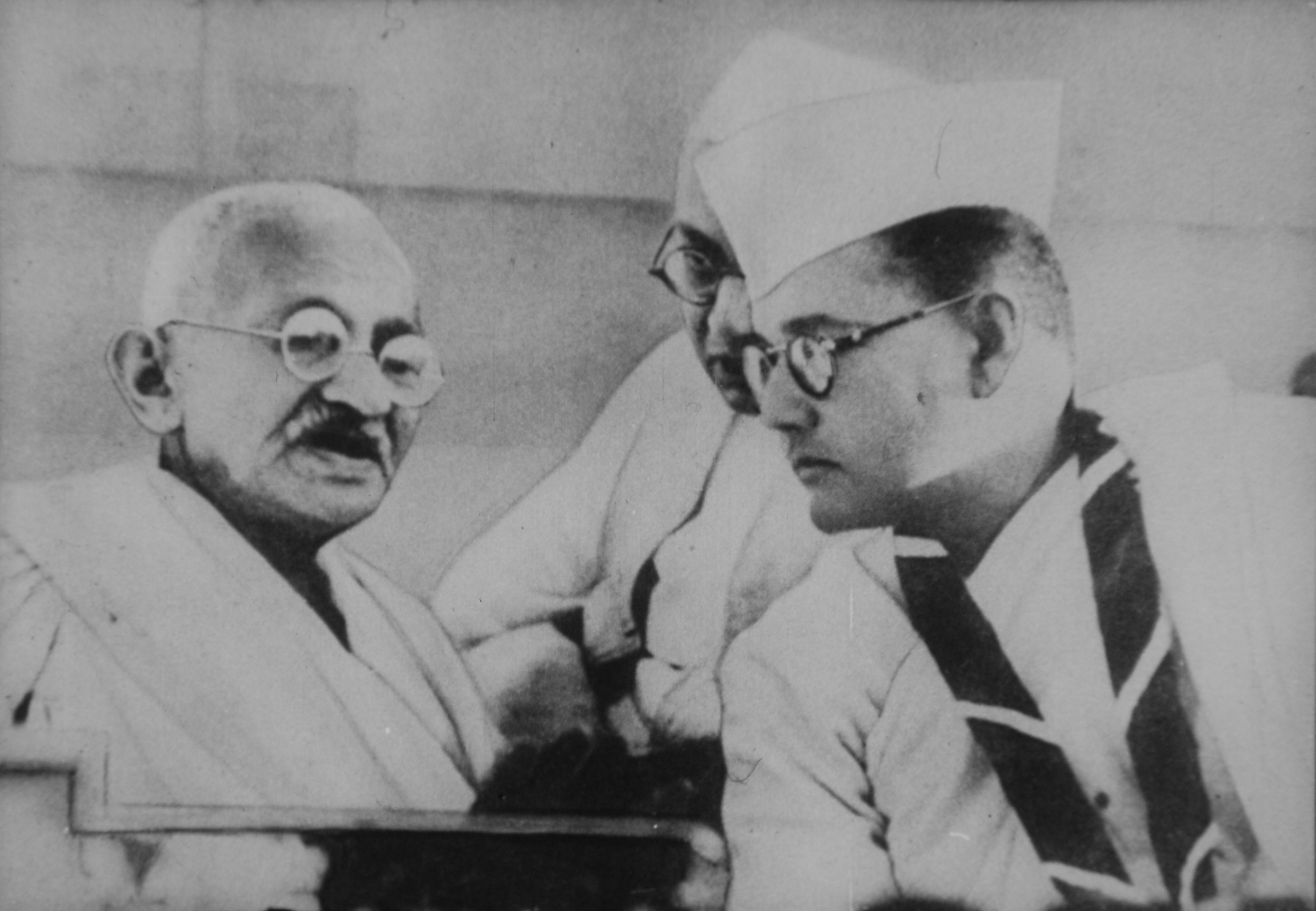
Subhas Bose with Mohandas Gandhi at a Congress meeting, c 1938

The exact organisation of the INA and its precise troop strength is not known, since its records were destroyed by the withdrawing Azad Hind Government before Rangoon was recaptured by Commonwealth forces in 1945. The order of battle described by Fay (constructed from discussions with INA-veterans), nonetheless, is similar to that described of the first INA by Toye in The Springing Tiger. The 1st Division, under M.Z. Kiani, drew many ex-Indian army prisoners of war who had joined Mohan Singh's first INA. It also drew prisoners of war who had not joined in 1942. It consisted of the 2nd Guerrilla Regiment (the Gandhi Brigade) consisting of two battalions under Col. Inayat Kiani; the 3rd Guerrilla Regiment (the Azad Brigade) with three battalions under Col. Gulzara Singh; and the 4th Guerrilla Regiment (or Nehru Brigade) commanded by the end of the war by Lt. Col Gurubaksh Singh Dhillon. The 1st Guerrilla Regiment – the Subhas Brigade – under Col. Shah Nawaz Khan was an independent unit, consisting of three infantry battalions. A special operations group was also to be set up called the Bahadur group (Valiant), to operate behind enemy lines.

A training school for INA officers, led by Habib ur Rahman, and the Azad School for the civilian volunteers were set up to provide training to the recruits. A youth wing of the INA, composed of 45 young Indians personally chosen by Bose and known as the Tokyo Boys, was also sent to Japan's Imperial Military Academy, where its members trained as fighter pilots. A separate all-female unit was also created under Lakshmi Sahgal. This unit was intended to have combat-commitments. Named Jhansi ki Rani ("Jhansi Queens") Regiment (after the legendary rebel Queen Lakshmibai of the 1857 rebellion), it drew female civilian volunteers from Malaya and Burma. The 1st Division was lightly armed. Each battalion was composed of five companies of infantry. The individual companies were armed with six antitank rifles, six Bren guns and six Vickers machine guns. Some NCOs carried hand grenades, while senior officers of the Bahadur groups attached to each unit issued hand grenades (of captured British stock) to men going forward on duty.

The 2nd Division was organised under Colonel Abdul Aziz Tajik It was formed largely after the Imphal offensive had started and drew large remnants of what remained of the Hindustan Field Force of the First INA. The 2nd Division consisted of the 1st Infantry Regiment, which later merged with the 5th Guerrilla Regiment to form the INA's 2nd Infantry Regiment under Col Prem Sahgal. The 1st Infantry Regiment drew many civilian volunteers from Burma and Malaya and was equipped with the largest share of the heavy armament that the INA possessed. An additional 3rd Division of the INA was composed chiefly of local volunteers in Malaya and Singapore. This unit disbanded before Japan surrendered. A motor transport division was also created, but it was severely limited by lack of resources. In 1945, at the end of the INA, it consisted of about 40,000 soldiers. Unlike Mohan Singh, whose assumption of the rank of general had generated opposition, Bose refused to take a rank. Both the soldiers of the INA and civilians addressed Bose as Netaji ("Dear leader"), a term first used in Berlin by members of the Free India Legion. In October 1943, Bose proclaimed the formation of the Arzi Hukumat-e-Azad Hind, or the Provisional Government of Free India (also known as Azad Hind or Free India). The INA was declared to be the army of Azad Hind.

== Operations ==
On 23 October 1943, Azad Hind declared war against Britain and the United States. Its first formal commitment came with the opening of the Japanese offensive towards Manipur, code-named U-Go. In the initial plans for invasion of India, Field Marshal Terauchi had been reluctant to confer any responsibilities to the INA beyond espionage and propaganda. Bose rejected this as the role of Fifth-columnists, and insisted that INA should contribute substantially in troops to form a distinct identity of an Indian-liberation army. He secured from Japanese army Chief of Staff, General Sugiyama, the agreement that INA would rank as an allied army in the offensive. The advanced headquarters of Azad Hind was moved to Rangoon in anticipation of success. The INA's own strategy was to avoid set-piece battles, for which it lacked armament as well as manpower. Initially it sought to obtain arms and increase its ranks by inducing British-Indian soldiers to defect. The latter were expected to defect in large numbers. Col Prem Sahgal, once military secretary to Subhas Bose and later tried in the first Red Fort trials, explained the INA strategy to Peter Fay – although the war itself hung in balance and nobody was sure if the Japanese would win, initiating a popular revolution with grass-roots support within India would ensure that even if Japan ultimately lost the war, Britain would not be in a position to re-assert its colonial authority. It was planned that, once Japanese forces had broken through British defences at Imphal, the INA would cross the hills of North-East India into the Gangetic plain, where it would work as a guerrilla army. This army was expected to live off the land, with captured British supplies, support, and personnel from the local population.

=== 1944 ===
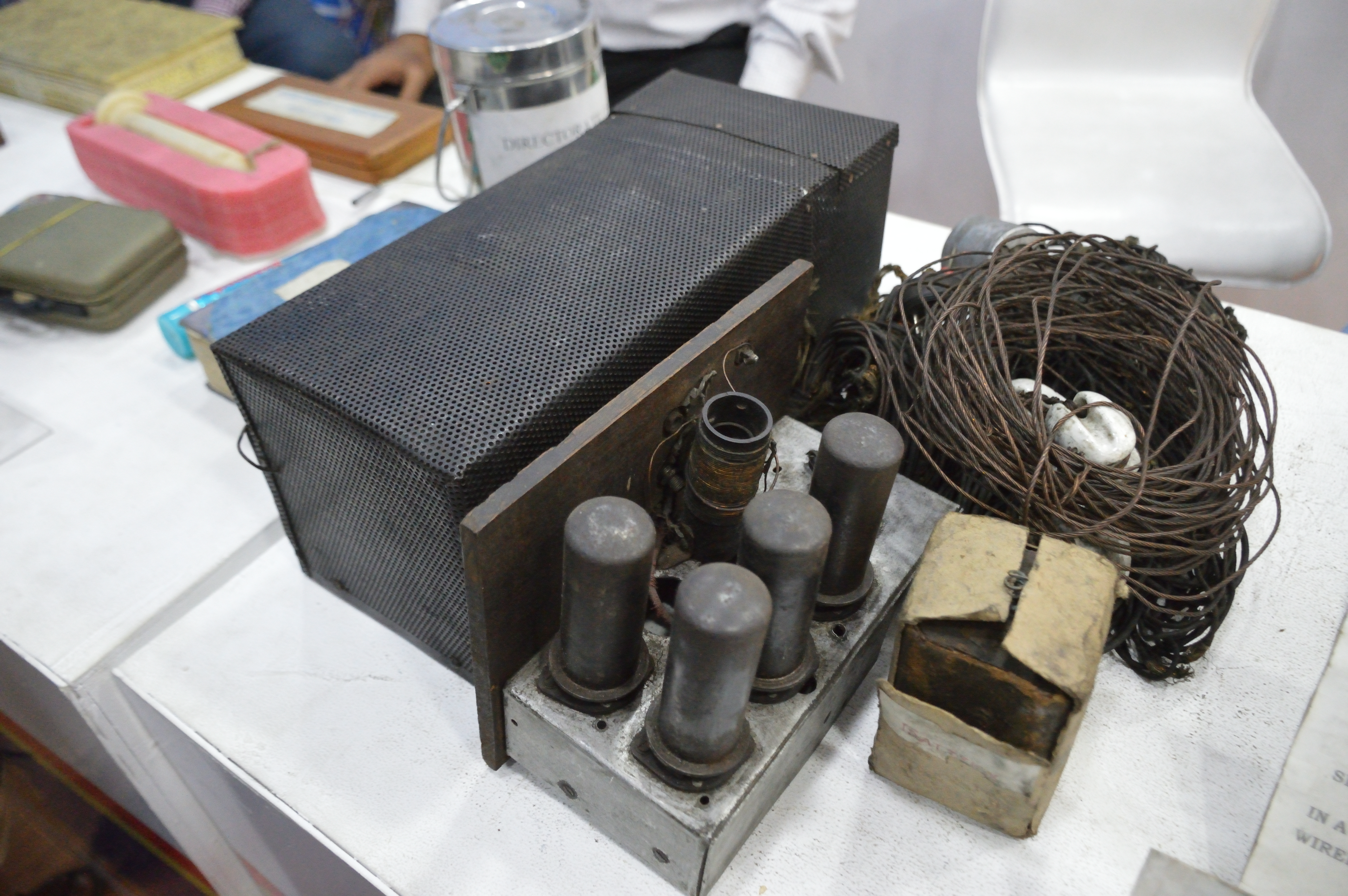
Radio transmitting set seized from INA agents in Calcutta, 1944. Four agents had been landed by submarine on the Indian coast, tasked with setting up a wireless post.

The plans chosen by Bose and Masakazu Kawabe, chief of the Burma area army, envisaged the INA being assigned an independent sector in the U-Go offensive. No INA units were to operate at less than battalion strength. For operational purposes, the Subhas Brigade was placed under the command of the Japanese General Headquarters in Burma. Advance parties of the Bahadur Group also went forward with advanced Japanese units. As the offensive opened, the INA's 1st Division, consisting of four guerrilla regiments, was divided between U Go and the diversionary Ha-Go offensive in Arakan. One battalion reached as far as Mowdok in Chittagong after breaking through the British West African Division. A Bahadur Group unit, led by Col. Shaukat Malik, took the border enclave of Moirang in early April. The main body of the 1st Division was however committed to the U-Go, directed towards Manipur. Led by Shah Nawaz Khan, it successfully protected the Japanese flanks against Chin and Kashin guerrillas as Renya Mutaguchi's three divisions crossed the Chindwin river and the Naga Hills, and participated in the main offensive through Tamu in the direction of Imphal and Kohima. The 2nd Division, under M.Z. Kiani, was placed to the right flank of the 33rd Division attacking Kohima. However, by the time Khan's forces left Tamu, the offensive had been held, and Khan's troops were redirected to Kohima. After reaching Ukhrul, near Kohima, they found Japanese forces had begun their withdrawal from the area. The INA's forces suffered the same fate as Mutaguchi's army when the siege of Imphal was broken. With little or nothing in the way of supplies, and with additional difficulties caused by the monsoon, Allied air dominance, and Burmese irregular forces, the 1st and 2nd divisions began withdrawing alongside the 15th Army and Burma Area Army. During the withdrawal through Manipur, a weakened Gandhi regiment held its position against the advancing Maratha Light Infantry on the Burma–India road while the general withdrawal was prepared. The 2nd and 3rd INA regiments protected the flanks of the Yamamoto force successfully at the most critical time during this withdrawal, but wounded and diseased men succumbed to starvation along the route. Commonwealth troops following the Japanese forces found INA dead along with Japanese troops who had died of starvation. The INA lost a substantial number of men and amount of materiel in this retreat. A number of units were disbanded or used to feed into new divisions.

=== 1945 ===
As the Allied Burma campaign began the following year, the INA remained committed to the defence of Burma and was a part of the Japanese defensive deployments. The Second Division was tasked with the defence of Irrawaddy and the adjoining areas around Nangyu, and offered opposition to Messervy's 7th Indian Division when it attempted to cross the river at Pagan and Nyangyu during Irrawaddy operations. Later, during the Battles of Meiktila and Mandalay, the forces under Prem Sahgal were tasked with defending the area around Mount Popa from the British 17th Division, which would have exposed the flank of Heitarō Kimura's forces attempting to retake Meiktila and Nyangyu. The division was obliterated, at times fighting tanks with hand grenades and bottles of petrol. Many INA soldiers realised that they were in a hopeless position. Many surrendered to pursuing Commonwealth forces. Isolated, losing men to exhaustion and to desertion, low on ammunition and food, and pursued by Commonwealth forces, the surviving units of the second division began an attempt to withdraw towards Rangoon. They broke through encircling Commonwealth lines a number of times before finally surrendering at various places in early April 1945. As the Japanese situation became precarious, the Azad Hind government withdrew from Rangoon to Singapore, along with the remnants of the 1st Division and the Rani of Jhansi Regiment. Nearly 6,000 troops of the surviving units of the INA remained in Rangoon under A. D. Loganathan. They surrendered as Rangoon fell and helped keep order until the Allied forces entered the city.

As the Japanese withdrawal from Burma progressed, other remnants of the INA began a long march overland and on foot towards Bangkok. In what has been called an "epic retreat to safety", Bose walked with his troops, refusing to leave them despite Japanese soldiers finding him transport. The withdrawing forces regularly suffered casualties from Allied planes strafing them and in clashes with Aung San's Burmese resistance, as well as from Chinese guerrillas who harassed the Japanese troops. Bose returned to Singapore in August to what remained of the INA and Azad Hind. He wished to stay with his government in Singapore to surrender to the British, reasoning that a trial in India and possible execution would ignite the country, serving the independence movement. He was convinced not to do so by the Azad Hind cabinet. At the time of Japan's surrender in September 1945, Bose left for Dalian near the Soviet border in Japanese-occupied China to attempt to contact the advancing Soviet troops, and was reported to have died in an air crash near Taiwan. The remaining INA troops surrendered under the command of M.Z. Kiani to British-Indian forces at Singapore.

== End of the INA ==
=== Repatriation to India ===
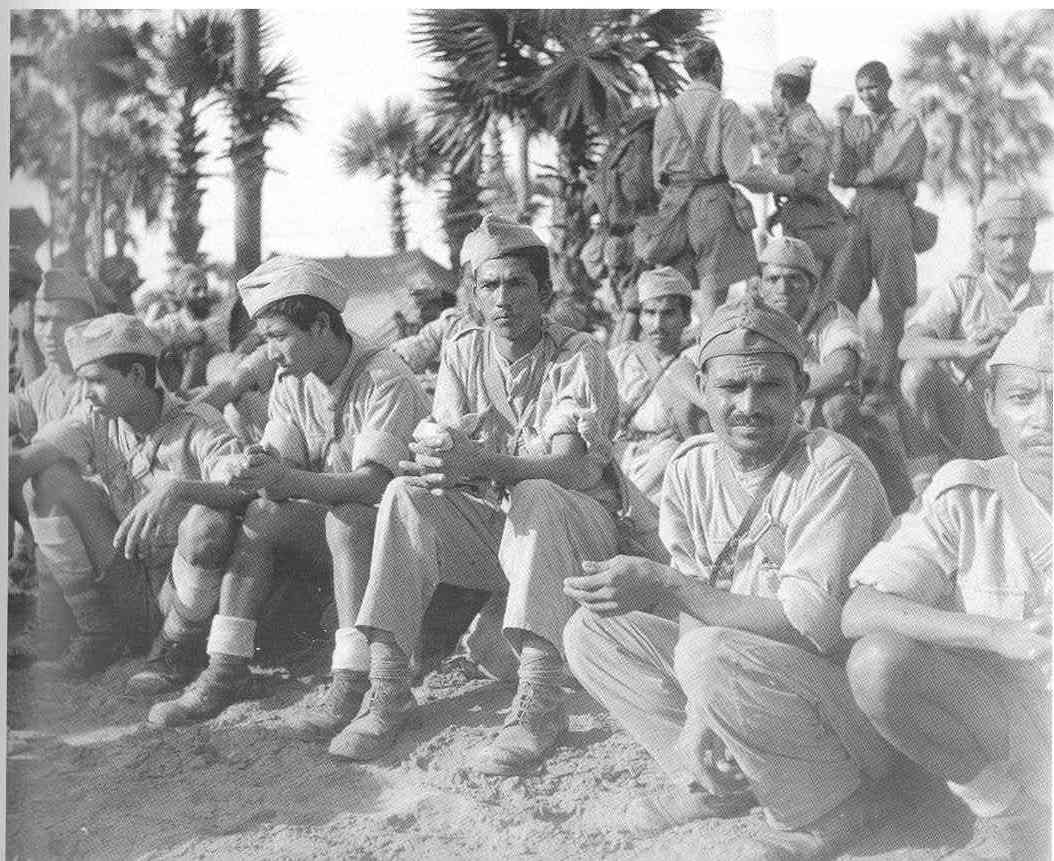
Troops of the Second Indian National Army who surrendered at Mount Popa. Circa April 1945.

Even before the end of the war in South Asia, the INA prisoners who were falling into Allied hands were being evaluated by forwarding intelligence units for potential trials. Almost fifteen hundred had been captured in the battles of Imphal and Kohima and the subsequent withdrawal, while larger numbers surrendered or were captured during the 14th Army's Burma Campaign. A total of 16,000 of the INA's 43,000 recruits were captured, of whom around 11,000 were interrogated by the Combined Services Directorate of Investigation Corps (CSDIC). The number of prisoners necessitated this selective policy which anticipated trials of those with the strongest commitment to Bose's ideologies. Those with lesser commitment or other extenuating circumstances would be dealt with more leniently, with the punishment proportional to their commitment or war crimes. For this purpose, the field intelligence units designated the captured troops as Blacks with the strongest commitment to Azad Hind; Greys with varying commitment but also with enticing circumstances that led them to join the INA; and Whites, those who were pressured into joining the INA under the circumstances but with no commitment to Azad Hind, INA, or Bose.

By July 1945, a large number had been shipped back to India. At the time of the fall of Japan, the remaining captured troops were transported to India via Rangoon. Large numbers of local Malay and Burmese volunteers, including the recruits to the Rani of Jhansi regiment, returned to civilian life and were not identified. Those repatriated passed through transit camps in Chittagong and Calcutta to be held at detention camps all over India including Jhingergacha and Nilganj near Calcutta, Kirkee outside Pune, Attock, Multan and at Bahadurgarh near Delhi. Bahadurgarh also held prisoners of the Free India Legion. By November, around 12,000 INA prisoners were held in these camps; they were released according to the "colours". By December, around 600 Whites were released per week. The process to select those to face trial started.

The British-Indian Army intended to implement appropriate internal disciplinary action against its soldiers who had joined the INA, whilst putting to trial a selected group in order to preserve discipline in the Indian Army and to award punishment for criminal acts where these had occurred. As news of the army spread within India, it began to draw widespread sympathy support and admiration from Indians. Newspaper reports around November 1945 reported executions of INA troops, which worsened the already volatile situation. Increasingly violent confrontations broke out between the police and protesters at the mass rallies being held all over India, culminating in public riotings in support of the INA men. This public outcry defied traditional communal barriers of the subcontinent, representing a departure from the divisions between Hindus and Muslims seen elsewhere in the independence movement and campaign for Pakistan.

=== Red Fort trials ===
Between November 1945 and May 1946, approximately ten courts-martial were held in public at the Red Fort in Delhi. Claude Auchinleck, the Commander-in-Chief of the British-Indian army, hoped that by holding public trials in the Red Fort, public opinion would turn against the INA if the media reported stories of torture and collaborationism, helping him settle a political as well as military question. Those to stand trials were accused variously of murder, torture and "waging war against the King-Emperor". However, the first and most celebrated joint courts-martial – those of Prem Sahgal, Gurubaksh Singh Dhillon and Shah Nawaz Khan – were not the story of torture and murder Auchinleck had hoped to tell the Indian press and people. The accusations against them included the alleged murder of their comrades-in-arms in the INA whilst in Burma. Peter Fay highlights in his book The Forgotten Army that the murders alleged were, in fact, courts-martial of captured deserters the defendants had presided over. If it was accepted that the three were part of a genuine combatant army (as the legal defence team later argued), they had followed due process of written INA law and of the normal process of conduct of war in execution of the sentences. Indians rapidly came to view the soldiers who enlisted as patriots and not enemy-collaborators. Philip Mason, then-Secretary of the War Department, later wrote that "in a matter of weeks ... in a wave of nationalist emotion, the INA were acclaimed heroes who fought for the freedom of India." The three accused were from the three major religions of India: Hinduism, Islam, and Sikhism. Indians felt the INA represented a true, secular, national army when judged against the British-Indian Army, where caste and religious differences were preserved amongst ranks. The opening of the first trial saw violence and a series of riots in a scale later described as "sensational". The Indian National Congress and the Muslim League both made the release of the INA prisoners an important political issue during the campaign for independence in 1945–1946. Lahore in Diwali 1946 remained dark as the traditional earthen lamps lit on Diwali were not lit by families in support of prisoners. In addition to civilian campaigns of non-cooperation and non-violent protest, protest spread to include mutinies within the British-Indian Army and sympathy within the British-Indian forces. Support for the INA crossed communal barriers to the extent that it was the last major campaign in which the Congress and the Muslim League aligned together; the Congress tricolour and the green flag of the League were flown together at protests.

The Congress quickly came forward to defend soldiers of the INA who were to be court-martialled. The INA Defence Committee was formed by the Indian Congress and included prominent Indian legal figures, among whom were Jawaharlal Nehru, Bhulabhai Desai, Kailashnath Katju and Asaf Ali. The trials covered arguments based on military law, constitutional law, international law, and politics. Mithi Mukherjee call the trials a "key moment in the elaboration of an anticolonial critique of international law in India." Much of the initial defence was based on the argument that they should be treated as prisoners of war as they were not paid mercenaries but bona fide soldiers of a legal government – Bose's Arzi Hukumat-e-Azad Hind. Nehru argued that "however misinformed or otherwise they had been in their notion of patriotic duty towards their country", they recognized the free Indian state as their sovereign and not the British sovereign. Peter Fay points out that at least one INA prisoner – Burhan-ud-Din a brother of the ruler of Chitral – may have deserved to be accused of torture, but his trial had been deferred on administrative grounds. Those charged after the first celebrated courts-martial only faced trial for torture and murder or abetment of murder. Charges of treason were dropped for fear of inflaming public opinion.

In spite of aggressive and widespread opposition to the continuation of the court-martial, it was completed. All three defendants were found guilty in many of the charges and sentenced to deportation for life. The sentence, however, was never carried out. Immense public pressure, demonstrations, and riots forced Claude Auchinleck to release all three defendants. Within three months, 11,000 soldiers of the INA were released after cashiering and forfeiture of pay and allowance. On the recommendation of Lord Mountbatten and with the agreement of Jawaharlal Nehru, former soldiers of the INA were not allowed to join the new Indian Armed Forces as a condition for independence.

Some mutinies in the Royal Indian Navy in 1946 are thought to have been caused by the nationalist feelings inspired by the opposition to INA trials. Historians like Sumit Sarkar, Peter Cohen, Fay and others suggest that these events played a crucial role in hastening the end of British rule.

== Post 1947 ==
Within India, the INA continues to be an emotive and celebrated subject of discussion. It continued to have a stronghold over the public psyche and the sentiments of the armed forces until as late as 1947. It has been suggested that Shah Nawaz Khan was tasked with organising INA troops to train Congress volunteers at Jawaharlal Nehru's request in late 1946 and early 1947. After 1947, several members of the INA who were closely associated with Subhas Bose and with the INA trials were prominent in public life. A number of them held important positions in independent India, serving as ambassadors immediately after independence: Abid Hasan in Egypt and Denmark, A. C. N. Nambiar in the Federal Republic of Germany, Mehboob Hasan in Canada, Cyril John Stracey in the Netherlands, and N. Raghavan in Switzerland. Mohan Singh was elected to the Rajya Sabha, the upper house of the Indian Parliament. He worked for the recognition of the members of Second Indian National Army as "freedom fighters" in the cause of the nation's independence in and out of Parliament. Shah Nawaz Khan served as Minister of State for Rail in the first Indian cabinet. Lakshmi Sahgal, Minister for Women's Affairs in the Azad Hind government, was a well known and widely respected public figure in India. In 1971, she joined the Communist Party of India (Marxist) and was later elected the leader of the All India Democratic Women's Association. Joyce Lebra, an American historian, wrote that the rejuvenation of the Dravida Munnetra Kazhagam, then a fledgling Tamil political party in southern India, would not have been possible without participation of INA members.

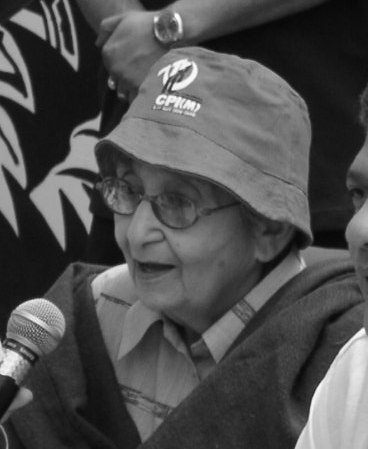
Ex-INA member Lakshmi Sahgal in later life, at a political meeting in India

Some accounts suggest that the INA veterans were involved in training civilian resistance forces against the Nizam's Razakars prior to the execution of Operation Polo and annexation of Hyderabad. It has been also documented that some INA veterans led Pakistani irregulars during the First Kashmir war. Mohammed Zaman Kiani served as Pakistan's political agent to Gilgit in the late 1950s. Of the very few ex-INA members who joined the Indian Armed Forces after 1947 R. S. Benegal, a member of the Tokyo Boys, joined the Indian Air Force in 1952 and later rose to be an air commodore. Benegal saw action in both 1965 and Indo-Pakistani War of 1971, earning a Maha Vir Chakra, India's second-highest award for valour.

Among other prominent members of the INA, Ram Singh Thakur, composer of a number of songs including the INA's regimental march Qadam Qadam Badhaye Ja, has been credited by some for the modern tune of the Indian national anthem.

Gurubaksh Singh Dhillon and Lakshmi Sahgal were later awarded the Indian civilian honours of Padma Bhushan and Padma Vibhushan respectively by the Indian Government in the 1990s. Lakshmi Sahgal was nominated for the Indian presidential election by communist parties in 2002. She was the sole opponent of A. P. J. Abdul Kalam, who emerged victorious. Subhas Bose himself was posthumously awarded Bharat Ratna in 1992, but this was later withdrawn over the controversy over the circumstances of his death.

Former INA recruits in diasporic Singapore, however, faced a different situation. In Singapore, Indians – particularly those who were associated with the INA – were treated with disdain as they were "stigmatized as fascists and Japanese collaborators". Some within this diaspora later emerged as notable political and social leaders. The consolidation of trade unions in the form of National Union of Plantation Workers was led by ex-INA leaders. In Malaya, notable members of the INA were involved in founding the Malaysian Indian Congress (MIC) in 1946; John Thivy was the founding president. Janaky Athi Nahappan, second-in-command of the Rani of Jhansi Regiment, was also a founding member of the MIC and later became a noted welfare activist and a distinguished senator in the Dewan Negara of the Malaysian Parliament. Rasammah Bhupalan, also of the Rani of Jhansi Regiment, later became a well-known welfare-activist and a widely respected champion for women's rights in Malaysia.

== Relations ==
=== Japanese Army ===
The INA was known as the puppet army of the Japanese empire. In early days, the officers in the INA distrusted the Japanese. Leaders of the first INA sought formal assurances from Japan before committing to war. When these did not arrive, Mohan Singh resigned after ordering his army to disband; he expected to be sentenced to death. After Bose established Azad Hind, he tried to establish his political independence from the regime that supported him. Indeed, he had led protests against the Japanese expansion into China, and supported Chiang Kai-shek during the 1930s. Azad Hind depended on Japan for arms and material but sought to be as financially independent as possible, levying taxes and raising donations from Indians in Southeast Asia". On the Japanese side, members of the high command had been personally impressed by Bose and were willing to grant him some latitude; more importantly, the Japanese were interested in maintaining the support of a man who had been able to mobilise large numbers of Indian expatriates – including, most importantly, 40,000 of the 45,000 Indians captured by the Japanese at Singapore. However, Faye notes that interactions between soldiers in the field was different. Attempts to use Shah Nawaz's troops in road building and as porters angered the troops, forcing Bose to intervene with Mutaguchi. After the withdrawal from Imphal, the relations between both junior non-commissioned officers and between senior officers had deteriorated. INA officers accused the Japanese Army high command of trying to deceive INA troops into fighting for Japan. Conversely, Japanese soldiers often expressed disdain for INA soldiers for having changed their oath of loyalty. This mutual dislike was especially strong after the withdrawal from Imphal began; Japanese soldiers, suspicious that INA defectors had been responsible for their defeat, addressed INA soldiers as "shameless one" instead of "comrade" as previously had been the case. Azad Hind officials in Burma reported difficulties with the Japanese military administration in arranging supply for troops and transport for wounded men as the armies withdrew. Toye notes that local IIL members and Azad Hind Dal (local Azad Hind administrative teams) organised relief supplies from Indians in Burma at this time. As the situation in Burma became hopeless for the Japanese, Bose refused requests to use INA troops against Aung San's Burma National Army, which had turned against Japan and was now allied with Commonwealth forces.

=== British-Indian Army ===
The first interaction of the INA with the British-Indian forces was during the months during the First Arakan offensive, between December 1942 and March 1943. The morale of Sepoys during this time was low and knowledge about the INA was minimal. The INA's special services agents led a successful operation during this time in encouraging the Indian troops to defect to the INA. By the end of March 1945, however, the Sepoys in the British-Indian Army were reinvigorated and perceived the men of the INA to be savage turncoats and cowards. Senior British officers in the Indian Army considered them "rabble". Historians Christopher Bayly and Tim Harper mention that sepoys in field units shot captured or wounded INA men, relieving their British officers of the complex task of formulating a formal plan for captured men. After Singapore was retaken, Mountbatten ordered the INA's war memorial to its fallen soldiers to be blown up.

As the story of the INA unfolded in post-war India, the view of Indian soldiers on the INA – and on their own position during the war – also changed. The Raj observed with increasing disquiet and unease the spread of pro-INA sympathies within the troops of the British-Indian forces. In February 1946, while the trials were still going on, a general strike by ratings of the Royal Indian Navy rapidly deteriorated into a mutiny incorporating ships and shore establishments of the RIN throughout India. The mutineers raised slogans invoking Subhas Bose and the INA, demanding an end to the trials. The mutiny received widespread public support. In some places in the British-Indian Army, non-commissioned Officers started ignoring orders from British superiors. In Madras and Pune British garrisons faced revolts from within the ranks of the British-Indian Army. These were suppressed by force. At the conclusion of the first trial, when the sentences of deportation were commuted, Fay records Claude Auchinleck as having sent a "personal and secret" letter to all senior British officers, explaining:

... practically all are sure that any attempt to enforce the sentence would have led to chaos in the country at large, and probably to mutiny and dissension in the Army, culminating in its dissolution.

== Influence ==
=== World War II ===
Sidney Bradshaw Fay concludes that the INA was not significant enough to beat the British-Indian Army by military strength. He also writes that the INA was aware of this and formulated its own strategy of avoiding set-piece battles, gathering local and popular support within India and instigating revolt within the British-Indian Army to overthrow the Raj. Moreover, the Forward Bloc underground movement within India had been crushed well before the offensives opened in the Burma–Manipur theatre, depriving the army of any organised internal support. However, despite its small numerical strength and lack of heavy weapons, its special services group played a significant part in halting the First Arakan Offensive while still under Mohan Singh's command. The propaganda threat of the INA and lack of concrete intelligence on the unit early after the fall of Singapore made it a threat to Allied war plans in Southeast Asia, since it threatened to destroy the Sepoys' loyalty to a British-Indian Army that was demoralised from continuing defeats. There were reports of INA operatives successfully infiltrating Commonwealth lines during the Offensive. This caused British intelligence to begin the "Jiffs" propaganda campaign and to create "Josh" groups to improve the morale and preserve the loyalty of the sepoys as consolidation began to prepare for the defence of Manipur. These measures included imposing a complete news ban on Bose and the INA that was not lifted until four days after the fall of Rangoon two years later.

During the Japanese U-Go offensive towards Manipur in 1944, the INA played a crucial (and successful) role in diversionary attacks in Arakan and in the Manipur Basin itself, where it fought alongside Mutaguchi's 15th Army. INA forces protected the flanks of the assaulting Yamamoto force at a critical time as the latter attempted to take Imphal. During the Commonwealth Burma Campaign, the INA troops fought in the battles of Irrawaddy and Meiktilla, supporting the Japanese offensive and tying down Commonwealth troops.

=== Indian independence ===
The first INA trial, which was held in public, became a rallying point for the independence movement from the autumn of 1945. The release of INA prisoners and the suspension of the trials came to be the dominant political campaign, superseding the campaign for independence. Christopher Bayly notes that the "INA was to become a much more powerful enemy of the British empire in defeat than it had been during its ill-fated triumphal march on Delhi." The Viceroy's journal describes the autumn and winter of 1945–1946 as "The Edge of a Volcano". The setting of the trial at Red Fort was taken by Indian public as a deliberate taunt by the British Raj over the vanquished INA, recalling the INA's battle cries of unfurling the Indian tricolour over the Red Fort. Many compared the trials to that of Bahadur Shah Zafar, the last Mughal emperor tried in the same place after the failed 1857 uprising. Support for the INA grew rapidly and their continued detention and news of impending trials was seen an affront to the movement for independence and to Indian identity itself. It was further feared that the Congress would exploit the INA to gain mass support against the Raj and possibly start an armed struggle with weapons smuggled from Burma. Nehru was suspected of using INA men to train Congress volunteers. The political effects of the INA trials were enormous and were felt around India as late as 1948, much to the chagrin of the Congress government in independent India, which feared that pro-INA sympathies could help alternative sources of power.

Historians such as Sumit Sarkar, Sugata Bose, and Ayesha Jalal conclude that the INA trials and its after-effects brought a decisive shift in British policy towards independence Indian. Particularly disturbing was the overt and public support for the INA by the soldiers of the Indian Army and the mutinies. The Congress's rhetoric preceding the 1946 elections gave the Raj reasons to fear a revival of the Quit India Movement of 1942. Gandhi noted:

... the whole country has been roused ... even the regular forces have been stirred into a new political consciousness and have begun to think in terms of independence ...

=== British colonies ===
After the war ended, the story of the INA and the Indian Legion was seen as so inflammatory that, fearing mass revolts and uprisings across its empire, the British Government forbade the BBC from broadcasting their story. The use of Indian troops for the restoration of Dutch and French rule in Vietnam and Indonesia fed into the already growing resentment within the forces. Indian troops sent to suppress Sukarno's agitations in Indonesia in 1946 rapidly identified with the nationalist sentiments in the previous Dutch colony. The South East Asia Command reported growing sympathy for the INA and dislike of the Dutch. There were similar pro-nationalist sentiments among Indian troops sent to Vietnam, Thailand and Burma. This led to the realisation by 1946 that the British-Indian Army, the bulwark of the policing force in the British colonies, could not be used as an instrument of British power. INA-inspired strikes emerged throughout Britain's colonies in Southeast Asia. In January 1946, protests started at Royal Air Force bases in Karachi and spread rapidly to Singapore. This was followed by a full-scale mutiny by a British Army unit in Singapore. In British Malaya, men of the Parachute Regiment refused to obey orders from their officers. Authors like Nilanjana Sengupta attribute these to a combination of dissatisfaction over pay and work conditions and conflicts of comradeship over the INA trials. Former INA members in Malaya identified closely with the left-wing organisations in opposing British colonial authority. The majority of prominent left-wing union leaders in Malaya after the war were members of the INA. The activities of the trade unions in the newly established Tamil schools were particularly influential, leading to the establishment of an inspector system by the British to supervise the curriculum and teaching in these schools. Joyce Lebra notes that the INA had a particularly strong unifying influence over ethnic Indians residing in Malaya. Lebra concludes that the experience of the INA was useful in challenging British authority in the post-war period in Malaya, and in improving the socio-economic conditions of the Indian community.

== Controversies ==
British and Commonwealth troops viewed the recruits as traitors and Axis collaborators. Almost 40,000 Indian soldiers in Malaya did not join the army and remained as PoWs. Many were sent to work in the Death Railway, suffered hardships and nearly 11,000 died under Japanese internment. Many of them cited the oath of allegiance they had taken to the King among reasons not to join a Japanese-supported organisation, and regarded the recruits of the INA as traitors for having forsaken their oath. Commanders in the British-Indian Army like Wavell later highlighted the hardships this group of soldiers suffered, contrasting them with the troops of the INA. Many British soldiers held the same opinion. Hugh Toye and Peter Fay point out that the First INA consisted of a mix of recruits joining for various reasons, such as nationalistic leanings, Mohan Singh's appeals, personal ambition or to protect men under their own command from harm. Fay notes some officers like Shah Nawaz Khan were opposed to Mohan Singh's ideas and tried to hinder what they considered a collaborationist organisation. However, both historians note that Indian civilians and former INA soldiers all cite the tremendous influence of Subhas Bose and his appeal to patriotism in rejuvenating the INA. Fay discusses the topic of loyalty of the INA soldiers, and highlights that in Shah Nawaz Khan's trial it was noted that officers of the INA warned their men the possibility of having to fight the Japanese after having fought the British, to prevent Japan exploiting post-war India. Carl Vadivella Belle suggested in 2014 that among the local Indians and ex-British-Indian Army volunteers in Malaya, there was a proportion who joined due to the threat of conscription as Japanese labour troops. Recruitment also offered local Indian labourers security from continual semi-starvation of the estates and served as a barrier against Japanese tyranny.

INA troops were alleged to engage in or be complicit in torture of Allied and Indian prisoners of war. Fay in his 1993 history analyses war-time press releases and field counter-intelligence directed at Sepoys. He concludes that the Jiffs campaign promoted the view that INA recruits were weak-willed and traitorous Axis collaborators, motivated by selfish interests of greed and personal gain. He concludes that the allegations of torture were largely products of the Jiffs campaign. He supports his conclusion by noting that isolated cases of torture had occurred, but allegations of widespread practice of torture were not substantiated in the charges against defendants in the Red Fort trials. Published memoirs of several veterans, including that of William Slim, portray the INA troops as incapable fighters and as untrustworthy. Toye noted in 1959 that individual desertions occurred in the withdrawal from Imphal. Fay concluded that stories of INA desertions during the battle and the initial retreat into Burma were largely exaggerated. The majority of desertions occurred much later, according to Fay, around the battles at Irrawaddy and later around Popa. Fay specifically discusses Slim's portrayal of the INA, pointing out what he concludes to be inconsistencies in Slim's accounts. Fay also discusses memoirs of Shah Nawaz, where Khan claims INA troops were never defeated in battle. Fay criticises this too as exaggerated. He concludes the opinions held by Commonwealth war veterans such as Slim were an inaccurate portrayal of the unit, as were those of INA soldiers themselves. Harkirat Singh notes that British officers' personal dislike for Subhas Chandra Bose may have prejudiced their judgement of the INA itself.

== Commemorations ==
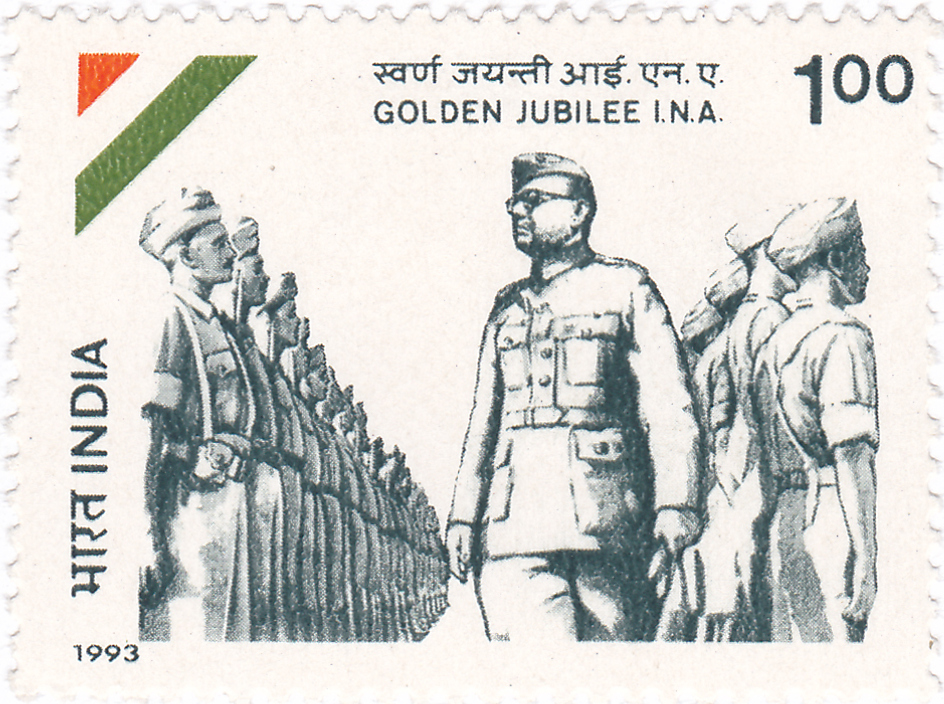
INA Golden Jubilee postage stamp

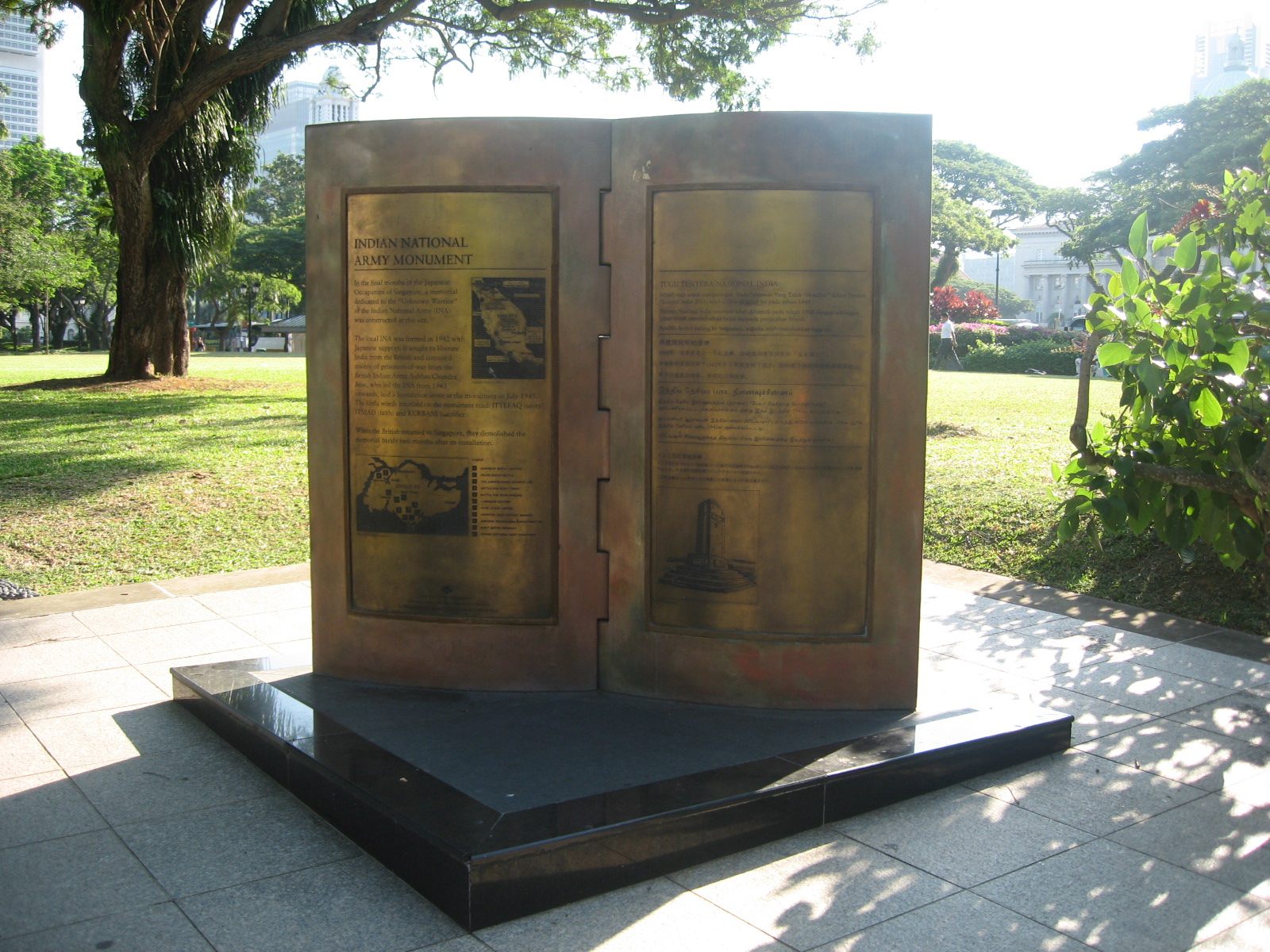
The plaque erected by the National Heritage Board at Esplanade Park, marking the INA Monument site in Singapore

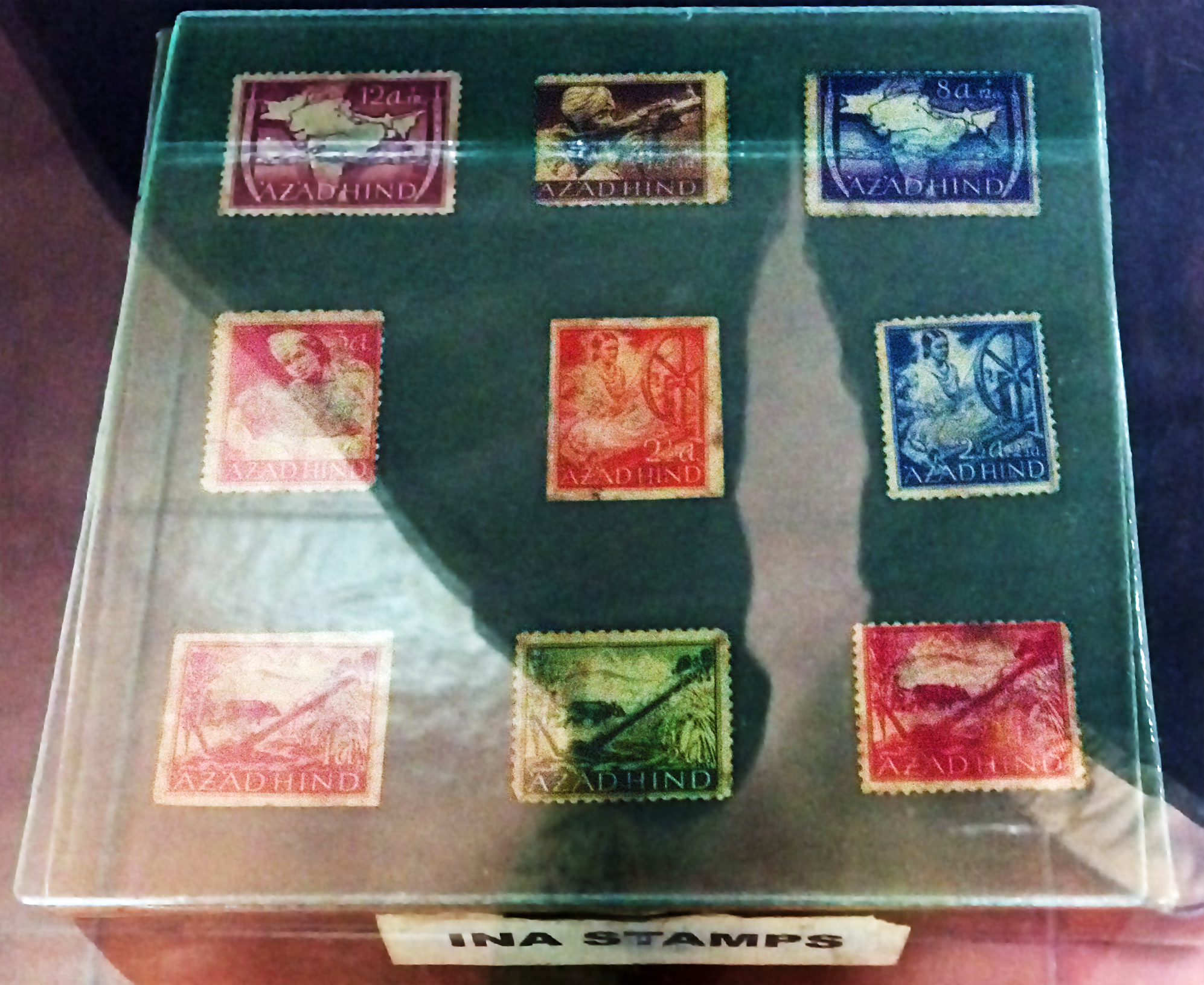
Postage stamps released by Second Indian National Army in display at Netaji Birth Place Museum, Cuttack

The INA is memorialised in the Swatantrata Sainani Smarak, which is located at the Salimgarh Fort in Delhi, adjacent to the Red Fort. Its exhibits include the Second Indian National Army uniform worn by Colonel Prem Sahgal, riding boots and coat buttons of Colonel Gurbaksh Singh Dhillon and photographs of Subhas Chandra Bose. A separate gallery holds material and photographs from excavations carried out by the Archaeological Survey of India inside the fort in 1995. The Second Indian National Army Memorial at Moirang, Manipur, commemorates the place where the flag of Azad Hind was raised by Col. Shaukat Hayat Malik. Moirang was the first Indian territory captured by the INA.

The INA War Memorial at Singapore commemorating the "Unknown Warrior" of the INA was unveiled by Bose in July 1945. Situated at the Esplanade Park, it was destroyed on Mountbatten's orders when Allied troops reoccupied the city. In 1995, the National Heritage Board of Singapore, with financial donations from the Indian community in Singapore, erected the Former Second Indian National Army Monument at the site where the old memorial stood. The site is now officially one of the historical sites of Singapore.

The INA's battle cry, Jai Hind, was declared the "national greeting" of India by Nehru and remains a popular nationalist greeting. Today it is used by all Indian prime ministers to conclude their Independence Day speeches. The cry became independent India's first commemorative post mark on 15 August 1947. The first postage stamps issued by Independent India are called the Jai Hind series of stamps, showing the Indian flag with the letters Jai Hind in the top right hand corner. These were a part of the series issued on 15 August 1947. Commemorative postage stamps were also issued by the Indian government in 1968 and 1993 respectively to commemorate the 25th and the 50th anniversaries of the establishment of Azad Hind at Singapore. The Department of Posts also includes the six unused Azad Hind stamps in its commemorative book India's Freedom Struggle through India Postage Stamps. The Azad Hind Fauj Marg (Azad Hind Fauj Road) in New Delhi is named after the INA and houses the Netaji Subhas Institute of Technology.

== In popular culture ==
The Second Indian National Army remains a significant topic of discussion in the popular history of India; it is an emotive topic which has been the subject of numerous works of literature, art, and visual media within India and outside. Some of the earliest works in print media were created at the time of the INA trials. These include works of fiction like Jai Hind: The Diary of a Rebel Daughter of India published in 1945 by Amritlal Seth. The book, a work of fiction narrating the story of a recruit of the Rani of Jhansi Regiment, is believed to be loosely based on the story of Lakshmi Sahgal. In later decades works by authors like Amitav Ghosh, such as his book The Glass Palace, have used the backdrop of the Azad Hind and the Japanese occupation of Burma for the narrative of the story. The Day of the Scorpion and The Towers of Silence, the second and third books in Paul Scott's Raj Quartet, mention Jiffs in the political and social context in which the term found use in the Eastern Army during the war. The 1984 British TV series The Jewel in the Crown, based on Scott's quartet, also includes the role of the INA as part of the political backdrop of the story.

In visual media, the INA has been the subject of a number of documentaries. The War of The Springing Tiger made by Granada Television for Channel 4 in 1984 examined the role of the Second Indian National Army in the Second World War, the motivation of its soldiers and explored its role in the independence movement. In 1999 Film India released a documentary, The Forgotten Army. Directed by Kabir Khan and produced by Akhil Bakshi, it followed what was called the Azad Hind Expedition between 1994 and 1995, retracing the route taken by the INA from Singapore to Imphal, before ending at Red Fort. Amongst the members of the expedition team were Gurubaksh Singh Dhillon, Lakshmi Sahgal and Captain S.S. Yadava, an INA veteran and once the general secretary of the All India INA Committee. The documentary went on to win the Grand Jury Prize at the Film South Asia festival in 1999. The National Archives of Singapore digitised its available resources in 2007 as Historical Journey of the Second Indian National Army. In 2004, the Indian Legion in Europe was the subject of a BBC magazine article authored by Mike Thomson, but it did not attempt to distinguish the differences between the Legion and the INA. The Hindustan Times, a large broadsheet in India, dedicates a part of its website to INA resources as Second Indian National Army in East Asia.

Indian cinema has also seen a number of films in many different Indian languages, where the INA is a significant part of the narrative. These include Pahla Admi by Bimal Roy and Samadhi by Ramesh Saigal, both produced in 1950 based on fictional INA veterans. More recently, Indian, a 1996 Tamil film directed by S. Shankar, incorporates a lead character (played by Kamal Hassan) in its story who is a veteran of the INA. Shyam Benegal produced Netaji: The Forgotten Hero in 2004, which traces the last five years of Subhas Chandra Bose. Benegal describes the story of the INA in small details in his film whilst focusing on its leader. The film was also widely noted for A. R. Rahman's music. The INA's marching song, Qadam Qadam Badhaye Ja, has since become a famous patriotic song in India. Today it is in use as the regimental quick march of the Indian Parachute regiment. More recently, a 2017 Hindi movie Rangoon, starring Kangna Ranaut, Saif Ali Khan, Shahid Kapoor is based against the backdrop of the INA presence in Rangoon, with the movie centred around the protagonists trying to get across a jewelled sword to the INA. In 2020 Amazon Prime Video released a five-part series called The Forgotten Army - Azaadi Ke Liye! Which tells the story of the INA through the eyes of one of its Captains and the woman he loves. In 2017 only, a show was released namely, Bose: Dead/Alive, it showed Netaji's mysterious disappearance in 1945. In this show too Azad Hind Fauj was shown.

== See also ==
- Battaglione Azad Hindoustan
- Ekla Chalo Re, a poem by Rabindranath Tagore, publicized by Subhas Chandra Bose
- Indian Legion
- Rani of Jhansi Regiment
- Arzi Hukumat-e-Azad Hind
- Burma National Army
- All India Forward Bloc
- Collaboration with the Empire of Japan

== Bibliography ==
- Aldrich, Richard J. (2000), Intelligence and the War Against Japan: Britain, America and the Politics of Secret Service, Cambridge University Press, ISBN 0-521-64186-1.
- Bayly, Christopher; Harper, Tim (2005), Forgotten Armies: Britain's Asian Empire and the War with Japan, Penguin Books (UK), ISBN 978-0-14-192719-0
- Belle, Carl Vadivelle (2014), Tragic Orphans: Indians in Malaysia, Institute of South-East Asian Studies, ISBN 978-981-4519-03-8
- Benegal, Ramesh Sakharam (2013), Burma to Japan with Azad Hind: A War Memoir 1941–1945, Lancer Publishers, ISBN 978-1-935501-11-4
- van Der Bijil, Nick (2013), Sharing the Secret: The History of the Intelligence Corps 1940–2010, Pen and Sword Books, ISBN 978-1-84884-413-1
- Bose, Sugata; Jalal, Ayesha (2004), Modern South Asia: History, Culture, Political Economy, Taylor & Francis, ISBN 978-0-415-30787-1
- Bose, Sugata (2006), A Hundred Horizons: Indian Ocean in the age of Global Empire, Harvard University Press., ISBN 0-674-02157-6
- Bose, Sugata (2013), His Majesty's Opponent, Harvard University Press, ISBN 978-0-674-04754-9
- Chaudhuri, Niradh C. (1953), "Subhas Chandra Bose: His Legacy and Legend", Pacific Affairs, 26, No. 4. (Dec., 1953) (4): 349–357, JSTOR 2752872
- Childs, David (2000), Britain Since 1945: A Political History, Routledge, ISBN 0-415-24804-3
- Cohen, Stephen P. (1963), "Subhas Chandra Bose and the Indian National Army.", Pacific Affairs, 36 (4), University of British Columbia, Vancouver: 411–429, doi:10.2307/2754686, JSTOR 2754686
- Cohen, Stephen C. (1971), The Indian Army: Its Contribution to the Development of a Nation, University of California Press, ISBN 978-0-19-565316-8
- Desai, Meghnad (2011), Rediscovery of India, Penguin Books UK, ISBN 978-81-8475-566-4
- Edwards, Michael (1963), The Last Years of British India, London Cassell
- Fay, Peter W. (1993), The Forgotten Army: India's Armed Struggle for Independence, 1942–1945, University of Michigan Press, ISBN 0-472-08342-2
- Forbes, Geraldine (1999), Women in Modern India. (Vol. 4), Cambridge University Press, ISBN 978-0-521-65377-0
- Gandhi, Gopal (2007), A Frank Friendship: Gandhi and Bengal: A Descriptive Chronology, Seagull Boks, ISBN 978-1-905422-63-0
- Gordon, Leonard A. (1990), Brothers Against the Raj: A Biography of Indian Nationalists Sarat and Subhas Chandra Bose., Rupa & Co., ISBN 978-81-7167-351-3
- Green, L.C. (1948), "The Indian National Army Trials", The Modern Law Review, 11, No. 1. (Jan., 1948), Blackwell: 47–69, doi:10.1111/j.1468-2230.1948.tb00071.x
- Hyam, Ronald (2007), Britain's Declining Empire: The Road to Decolonisation, 1918–1968, Cambridge University Press, ISBN 978-0-521-86649-1
- James, Lawrence (2000), Raj: The Making and Unmaking of British India, St. Martin's Griffin, ISBN 978-0-312-26382-9
- Kochanek, Stanley; Hardgrave, Robert (2007), India: Government and Politics in a Developing Nation, Thomson Wadworth, ISBN 978-0-495-00749-4
- Kunju, N. (1998), Free India's Army: Problems at 50, Reliance Publishing House, ISBN 81-7510-087-7.
- Lebra, Joyce C. (1977), Japanese Trained Armies in South-East Asia, New York, Columbia University Press, ISBN 0-231-03995-6
- Lebra, Joyce C. (1971), Jungle Alliance, Japanese and the Indian National Army., Asia Pacific Press, ISBN 0-231-03995-6
- Lebra, Joyce C. (2008), Indian National Army and Japan, Institute of South-East Asian Studies, ISBN 978-981-230-806-1
- Lebra, Joyce C. (2008b), Women Against the Raj: The Rani of Jhansi Regiment, Institute of South-East Asian Studies, ISBN 978-981-230-808-5
- Lok Sabha (1993), Parliamentary Debates, Lok Sabha Secretariat
- Marston, Daniel (2014), The Indian Army and End of the Raj, Cambridge University Press, ISBN 978-0-521-89975-8
- Mehta, Vinod (2006), Delhi and NCR City Guide, Outlook Publishing (India), ISBN 0-231-03995-6
- Menon, V.P. (1997), The Transfer of Power in India, Orient Blackswan, ISBN 978-81-250-0884-2
- McMillan, R (2006), The British Occupation of Indonesia: 1945–1946 Britain, The Netherlands and the Indonesian Revolution, Routledge, ISBN 0-415-35551-6
- Ooi, Keat Gin, ed. (2004), Southeast Asia: A Historical Encyclopedia, from Angkor Wat to East Timor, (Vol 1), ABC-CLIO, ISBN 1-57607-770-5
- Ram, Indrani Jagjivan (2010), Milestones: A Memoir, Penguin Books India, ISBN 978-0-670-08187-5
- Raman, Sita Anantha (2009), Women in India: A Social and Cultural History, ABC-CLIO, ISBN 978-0-313-01440-6
- Sareen, Tilak Raj (1986), Japan and the Indian National Army, Agram Prakashan
- Sareen, Tilak Raj (1996), Japan and the Indian National Army, Mounto Publishing House
- Sengupta, Nilanjana (2012), A Gentleman's Word: The Legacy of Subhas Chandra Bose in Southeast Asia, ISEAS Publishing, ISBN 978-981-4379-75-5
- Singh, Harkirat (2003), INA Trials and the Raj, Atlantic Publishers, ISBN 81-269-0316-3
- Slim, W. (1961), Defeat Into Victory, David McKay, ISBN 1-56849-077-1
- Sarkar, Sumit (1983), Modern India, 1885–1947, Macmillan, ISBN 978-0-333-90425-1
- Stenson, M. (2011). Class, Race, and Colonialism in West Malaysia. UBC Press. ISBN 978-0-7748-4440-6.
- Tojo, Hideki (Premier) (1943), Axis War Makes Easier Task of Indians. Chandra Bose's Berlin Speech. Syonan Simbun, Domei
- Toye, Hugh (1959), The Springing Tiger: A Study of the Indian National Army and of Netaji, Allied Publishers, ISBN 978-81-8424-392-5
- Toye, Hugh (2007), Subhash Chandra Bose, JAICO Publishing House, ISBN 978-81-7224-401-9
