= John Thivy =

Malayan politician and lawyer (1904-1959)

- ஜான் திவி

1st President of Malayan Indian Congress
- In office 4 August 1946 – 1947
- Monarch: George VI
- Preceded by: Position established
- Succeeded by: Baba Budh Singh Ji

Indian Commissioner to Mauritius
- In office 2 September 1950 – 10 September 1953
- Preceded by: Dharam Yash Dev
- Succeeded by: A. M. Sahay

Indian Ambassador to Syria
- In office 10 September 1953 – 1955
- Succeeded by: de:V. M. Madhavan Nair

Indian Ambassador to Italy
- In office 1955–1955
- Preceded by: Binay Ranjan Sen
- Succeeded by: es:Khub Chand

Indian Ambassador to the Netherlands
- In office 6 December 1957 – 4 June 1959
- Preceded by: Birendra Narayan Chakravarty
- Succeeded by: Raj Krishna Tandon

Personal details
- Born: 1904 Kuala Kangsar, Perak, Federated Malay States, British Malaya
- Died: 4 June 1959 (aged 54–55) The Hague, Netherlands
- Party: Malayan Indian Congress

John Thivy (Tamil: ஜான் திவி; 1904 – 4 June 1959) was a Malayan politician and lawyer who was the founding president of the Malayan Indian Congress.

Thivy finished schooling at St. Michael's Institution in Ipoh, Perak. He studied law in London, before returning to practise in Malaya. In London, Thivy had a chance to meet Mohandas Gandhi and came to be interested in the Indian independence movement. On his return to Malaya, after getting his law degree in 1932, he became involved with the Indian nationalist movements.

Later, after the fall of Malaya to the Japanese, Thivy's interest was rekindled by a speech given by Subhas Chandra Bose at one of his rallies in 1943. Thivy joined the Indian National Army in 1943 and served on the Burma Front. He also served in a ministerial cabinet post under Bose's Provisional Government of Free India, the Azad Hind.

After Japan's surrender, John Thivy was held at Changi Prison for collaboration and was only released after India's independence.

On 4 August 1946, Thivy became the 1st and founding President of the Malayan Indian Congress (MIC), which represented Indian interests in Malaya. He was helped in the establishment of the party by other notable individuals such as Janaky Athi Nahappan. The MIC was modelled after the Indian National Congress. The party participated in the Malayan Independence movement.

In 1948, Thivy was appointed as an official to represent India in Southeast Asia by the Nehru Government.

== See also ==
- Indian National Army
- Janaky Athi Nahappan
- Malayan Indian Congress
