= Hugh Toye =

British Army intelligence officer (1917–2012)

Claude Hugh Morley Toye
- Born: 29 March 1917
- Died: 15 April 2012 (aged 95)
- Citizenship: England
- Occupation: Army intelligence officer
- Spouse: Betty
- Awards: MBE

Colonel Claude Hugh Morley Toye MBE (29 March 1917 – 15 April 2012) was a British Army intelligence officer, academic and expert on South Asia who worked in India and Burma during World War II.

He enlisted in the ranks of the Royal Army Medical Corps and, as a Lance Corporal, was mentioned in despatches in the London Gazette 20 December 1940 under the heading "The names of the undermentioned have been brought to notice in recognition of distinguished services in connection with operations in the field. March–June, 1940."

He received a wartime emergency commission into the British Army as a second Lieutenant in the Royal Artillery after successfully passing the course at an Officer Cadet Training Unit on 10 May 1941.

Working in the Combined Services Detailed Interrogation Centre (India), Toye was tasked with interrogation of captured troops of the Japanese army and the Indian National Army. In private, he also admitted to being tasked with burning British Raj-era documents at Red Fort. Toye's work recording the history of the INA, The Springing Tiger published in 1959, was one of the first authoritative histories on the army penned by a western scholar.

He was granted a regular British Army commission in the rank of Lieutenant in the Royal Artillery on 28 February 1945. and was appointed a Member of the Order of the British Empire (Military Division) in the London Gazette 1 January 1947 where he is listed as a temporary Major, Royal Artillery.

After the war Toye worked with the British army in South-east Asia. He worked in various capacities in Burma, Laos and Hong Kong and Bangkok in between short spells in Europe. He earned a PhD from Nuffield College Oxford in late 1960s.

Toye retired from the army in 1972.
