= Janaky Athi Nahappan =

Founding member:Malaysian Indian Congress (1925–2014)

Yang Berbahagia Puan Sri Datin Janaky Athi Nahappan
- Born: 25 February 1925; Kuala Lumpur, British Malaya (now Malaysia)
- Died: 9 May 2014 (aged 89); Kuala Lumpur, Malaysia
- Known for: Figure of Indian independence movement And Malaysian independence movement, Co founder of Malaysian Indian Congress
- Title: Notable commander of Rani of Jhansi Regiment Indian National Army, Puan Sri
- Political party: Malaysian Indian Congress
- Spouse: Athi Nahappan
- Children: 3

Janaky (25 February 1925 – 9 May 2014), better known as Janaky Athi Nahappan, was a Malayan politician and activist who was founding member of the Malaysian Indian Congress and one of the earliest women involved in the fight for Malaysian (then Malaya) independence.

Janaki grew up in a privileged Tamil family in Malaya and was only 16 when she heard Subhas Chandra Bose's appeal to Indians to give whatever they could for their fight for Indian independence. Immediately she took off her gold earrings and donated them. She was determined to join the women's wing, the Rani of Jhansi Regiment of the Indian National Army. There was strong family objection especially from her father. But after much persuasion, her father finally agreed.

She was among the first women to join the Indian National Army organised during the Japanese occupation of Malaya to fight for Indian independence with the Japanese. Having been brought up in luxury, she initially could not adapt to the rigours of army life. However, she gradually got used to military life and her career in the regiment took off. She became second in command of the regiment.

After World War II she emerged as a welfare activist.

Janaki found the Indian National Congress's fight for Indian independence inspiring and joined the Indian Congress Medical Mission in then Malaya. In 1946 Nahappan helped John Thivy to establish the Malayan Indian Congress, which was modelled after the Indian National Congress. The party saw Thivy as its first president.

The Government of India awarded her the fourth highest civilian honour of Padma Shri in 2000. She died at her house on 9 May 2014 due to pneumonia.

== See also ==
- Rasammah Bhupalan
- Lakshmi Sahgal
