= Peter W. Fay =

American historian (1924–2004)

Peter Ward Fay (December 3, 1924 – January 18, 2004) was an American historian and authority on India and China. He was a professor at the California Institute of Technology from 1955 until his retirement in 1997.

Professor Fay received his bachelor's degree from Harvard in 1947, where his studies were interrupted to serve in Italy during World War II. Afterwards, he attended Oxford University as a Rhodes Scholar and then returned to Harvard for his PhD, which he received in 1954. After a brief period teaching at Williams College, he came to Caltech, where he remained for the rest of his career. At Caltech, Fay taught a variety of courses in European history and also developed an interest in Asia, especially India and China.

Among his books were the award-winning The Opium War, 1840-1842 (1975) and The Forgotten Army: India's Armed Struggle for Independence, 1942-1945 (1993) written on the Indian National Army. His two years spent at the Indian Institute of Technology, Kanpur, during the 1960s, in its humanities department. Also, during his days at Indian Institute of Technology, Kanpur, he came in contact with Lakshmi Sahgal(Captain Laxmi Sehgal) and her husband, Prem Sahgal(Colonel Prem Kumar Sehgal), both former high-ranking officers in Subhash Chandra Bose-led INA, who gave him deeper insights into Indian National Army's history and helped him form his interest in Indian history.

== Books ==
- The Forgotten Army: India's Armed Struggle for Independence, 1942-1945, 1993, ISBN 0-472-08342-2 / ISBN 81-7167-356-2
- The Opium War, 1840-1842, 1975, ISBN 0-8078-4714-3 / ISBN 0-8078-1243-9
