= Nilanjana Sengupta (author) =

Indian historian and author

Nilanjana Sengupta (born c. 1971–1981) is an Indian author and historian based in Singapore. Originally from Kolkata, she has lived in Singapore since 2010.

== Career ==
Sengupta studied human resources (HR) at the Presidency College of the University of Kolkata, and served as the head of HR for Electrolux in Delhi before turning to writing. As of 2023, she is a visiting scholar at the National University of Singapore's Asia Research Institute.

Sengupta writes about historical topics in Southeast Asia and the Indian subcontinent, and is particularly interested in feminist awakening in the region. Her 2020 biography of Singaporean poet Edwin Thumboo, The Votive Pen, was shortlisted for the Singapore Literature Prize and the Singapore Book Award.

== Works ==
- A Gentleman's Word: The Legacy of Subhas Chandra Bose in Southeast Asia. Singapore: Institute of Southeast Asian Studies. 2012. ISBN 9789814379793.
- Sengupta, Nilanjana (2015). The Female Voice of Myanmar: Khin Myo Chit to Aung San Suu Kyi. Cambridge University Press. doi:10.1017/CBO9781316342916. ISBN 978-1-107-11786-0.
- Singapore, My Country: Biography of M. Bala Subramanion. Singapore: WS Professional. 2016. ISBN 9789813141285.
- The Votive Pen: Writings on Edwin Thumboo. Singapore: Penguin Random House SEAsia. 2020. ISBN 9789814882132.
- Chickpeas to Cook and Other Stories. Penguin Random House. 2023. ISBN 9789815017038.
