= Rani of Jhansi Regiment =

Women's regiment of the Indian National Army

Rani Jhansi Regiment
- A female paratrooper of the Rani of Jhansi Regiment in training in the 1940s.
- Active: 12 October 1943 – May 1945
- Country: Azad Hind
- Allegiance: Indian National Army (Azad Hind Fauj)
- Branch: Indian National Army
- Type: Infantry
- Size: 1,000 (approx)

Commanders
- Ceremonial chief: Subhas Chandra Bose/Muhamad Ziauddin
- Notable commanders: Lakshmi Swaminathan; Janaki Devar

The Rani of Jhansi Regiment was the women's regiment of the Indian National Army, the armed force formed by Indian nationalists in 1942 in Southeast Asia with the aim of overthrowing the British Raj in colonial India, with Japanese assistance. It was one of the all-female combat regiments of the Second World War on all sides. Led by Captain Lakshmi Swaminathan (better known as Lakshmi Sahgal), the unit was raised in July 1943 with volunteers from the expatriate Indian population in Southeast Asia. The unit was named the "Rani Jhansi Regiment" after Rani Lakshmi Bai, Rani of Jhansi, a renowned Indian queen and freedom fighter.

== Establishment ==
Bose announced the formation of the Regiment on 12 July 1943. Most of the women were teenage volunteers of Indian descent from Malayan rubber estates; very few had ever been to India. The initial nucleus of the force was established with its training camp in Singapore with approximately a hundred and seventy cadets. The cadets were given ranks of non-commissioned officer or sepoy (private) according to their education. Later, camps were established in Rangoon and Bangkok and by November 1943, the unit had more than three hundred cadets. The Indian War of Independence, a book by Vinayak Damodar Savarkar, is said to have inspired the formation of the regiment.

== Training ==
Training in Singapore began on 23 October 1943. The recruits were divided into sections and platoons and were accorded ranks of Non-Commissioned Officers and Sepoys according to their educational qualifications. These cadets underwent military and combat training with drills, route marches as well as weapons training in rifles, hand grenades, and bayonet charges. Later, a number of the cadets were chosen for more advanced training in jungle warfare in Burma. The Regiment had its first passing out parade at the Singapore training camp of five hundred troops on 30 March 1944.

Some 200 of the cadets were also chosen for nursing training, forming the Chand Bibi Nursing Corps.

== Service ==
During the INA's Imphal campaign, an initial contingent of nearly a hundred of the Rani of Jhansi troops moved to Maymyo, part of which was intended to form a vanguard unit to enter the Gangetic plains of Bengal after the expected fall of Imphal. A part of the unit also formed the nursing corps at the INA hospital at Maymyo. Following the failure of the siege of Imphal and the INA's disastrous retreat, the Rani troops were tasked with coordinating the relief and care of the INA troops who arrived at Monywa and to Maymyo and were not used in combat.

== End of the regiment ==
After the fall of Rangoon and the withdrawal of the Azad Hind government and Subhas Chandra Bose from the city and through Burma, the troops originating from Burma were allowed to disband, while the remainder of the regiment retreated along with the retreating Japanese forces on foot and, when available, on mechanised transport. During the retreat, it suffered some attacks both from Allied air attacks, as well as from the Burmese resistance forces. The total number of casualties suffered is not known. The unit later disbanded.

== See also ==
- Lakshmi Sahgal
- Indian National Army
- Janaky Athi Nahappan
- Women in the military

== Sources ==
- Hills, Carol and; Daniel C. Silverman (October 1993). "Nationalism and Feminism in Late Colonial India: The Rani of Jhansi Regiment" (PDF). Modern Asian Studies. 27 (4). Cambridge University Press: 741–760. doi:10.1017/S0026749X00001281. ISSN 0026-749X. S2CID 144550568. Archived from the original (PDF) on 3 March 2016 – via Cal State LA.
- Lebra, Joyce Chapman (2008). Women Against the Raj: The Rani of Jhansi Regiment. Institute of Southeast Asian Studies. ISBN 978-981-230-809-2 – via Googlebooks.
- Deka, Meeta (2013). Women's agency and social change : Assam and beyond. SAGE Publishing India. ISBN 978-935-150-784-0 – via Googlebooks.
