= Battle of Pokoku and Irrawaddy River operations =

Part of the Allied Burma campaign in WWII

Coordinates: 21°19′53″N 95°03′27″E

Battle of Pakokku and Irrawaddy River
- Part of the Central Burma Campaign of World War II
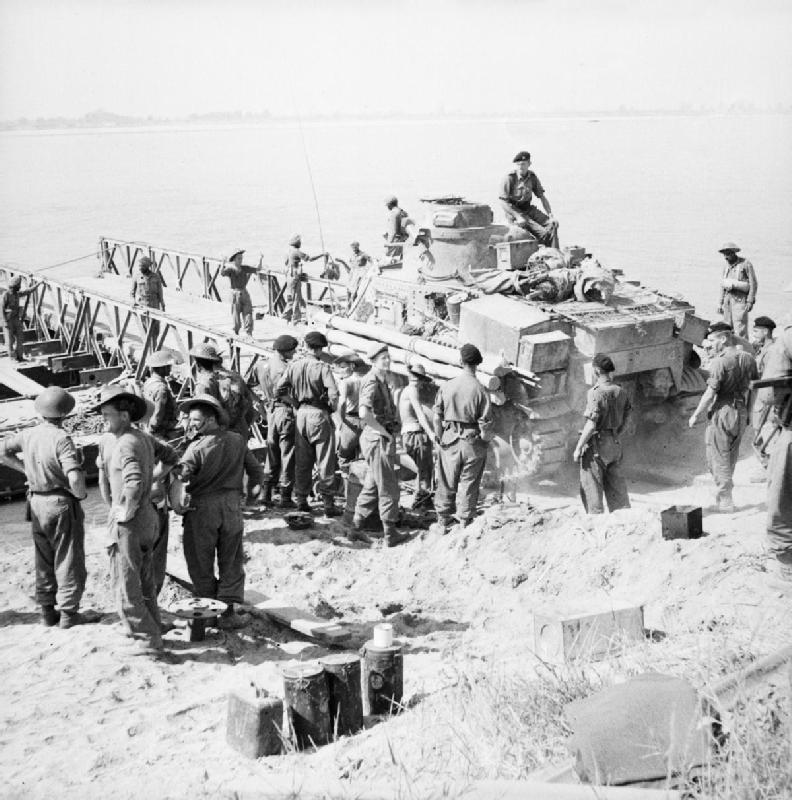
- A Lee tank loaded onto a pontoon ferry by British troops before crossing the Irrawaddy River at Ngazun, 28 February 1945
Date	4 February–13 May 1945 (3 months, 1 week and 2 days)
Location	Pakokku, British Burma
Result	Allied victory

Belligerents
United Kingdom and Empire: India; Canada	Japan: Azad Hind

Commanders and leaders
(United Kingdom) Frank Messervy	(Empire of Japan) Heitarō Kimura; Shah Nawaz Khan

Strength
(India) 7th Indian Division (India) 17th Indian Division	(Empire of Japan) 31st Division (Empire of Japan) 33rd Division (Empire of Japan) 15th Division (India) INA 1st Division

Casualties and losses
Unknown	Unknown

The Battle of Pakokku and Irrawaddy River operations were a series of battles fought between the British Indian Army and the Imperial Japanese Army and allied forces over the successful Allied Burma campaign on the China Burma India Theater during World War II. The battles and operations were instrumental in facilitating the eventual capture of Rangoon in summer 1945.

== Background ==
=== Preparation ===
The Japanese 31st Division's thrust at Kohima had been a costly failure, eventually forcing it to a disastrous retreat. The Japanese 33rd Division, Japanese 15th Division and the INA 1st Division had suffered a similar fate at Imphal. The Japanese and their allied forces lost at least fifty thousand dead. In previous years there used to be a lull in fighting during the monsoon period but not this year (1944–45). The command decided that it was time to target the heart of Japanese Army in Burma. General William "Bill" Slim's plan through the monsoon months had been pursuit of the defeated Japanese in Kohima and plains of Imphal with 5th Indian Infantry Division down the Tiddim Road and 11th East African Division down the Kabaw Valley, until the two joined at Kalemyo. The next offensive plan centred on the occupation of Central Burma, as far south as Mandalay to exploit further south and destroy the Japanese forces in the Shwebo Plains, north of Irrawaddy, where armour could be used. Allied forces crossed River Chindwin and the spearheads of both corps of the Fourteenth Army (IV and XXXIII Corps) were moving into selected battle areas, which surprised the Japanese as they had not anticipated any major operations during the monsoon period. The British Fourteenth Army was now faced with a major obstacle (the Irrawaddy) covered by determined Japanese. The Irrawaddy River in its middle is about 2,000 yards (1,800 m) broad and dotted with treacherous and shifting sand bars. An opposed direct crossing would have cost heavy casualties with a low chance of success.

=== Offensive Plan ===
The new situation required a different plan, revolving under surprise and crossing of the Irrawaddy River for fighting major battles in the plains around Mandalay and in the low hills of Meiktila. Since there was not enough equipment to make an opposed river crossing, Slim planned more than one crossing with adequate deception plans as to where the real assault in strength was to take place. It was decided to make sufficiently strong crossing north of Mandalay to draw main enemy forces, while making the main crossing in the south of Japanese concentrations below Mandalay. The revised plan pertaining to 7th Indian Infantry Division was IV Corps less 19th Division (7th Indian Division, 17th Indian Infantry Division, 28th East African Brigade, Lushai Brigade, and 255th Indian Tank Brigade) to move due south, down the Gangaw valley for nearly 300 miles, seize a bridgehead on Irrawaddy at Pakokku and then strike southeast with mechanised forces at Meiktila and Thazi, with air maintenance.

=== 7th Division Plan ===
The next operation across the Irrawaddy River was to be a magnificent stroke of bravery and deception, that was to make possible the destruction of the Japanese army in Burma. This involved advance through Gangaw Valley and crossing of Irrawaddy River at Nyaung U. Thereafter a quick thrust would be made towards Meiktila, the capture of which was to cut off the Japanese that were fighting in the northern and central Burma. The operation of the 7th Indian Infantry Division was initiated by 114th Indian Infantry Brigade which moved to Tamu, constructing a stretch of 180 miles (over 280 Kilometres) of motorable road from Tamu to Gangaw in 15 days. 114th Brigade and Divisional Headquarters moved along the main axis Kaley Valley road. The advance was to begin on 19 January 1945 and the 7 Indian Infantry Divisional tasks were:

- Advance and seize the Pauk area up to and including crossing of Yaw Chaung by not later than 1 February 1945.
- To seize a bridgehead over the Irrawaddy between Chauk and Pakokku suitable for advance to Meiktila by not later than 15 February 1945.

== Battle of Pakokku ==
The Japanese had been defeated in the Battles of Kohima and Imphal and the offensive to destroy Japanese forces north of the Irrawaddy River was planned with a surprise crossing of the river. The 7th Indian Infantry Division and other formations were to seize a bridgehead on Irrawaddy at Pakokku by 15 February 1945 and move southeast with mechanised forces. The operations of the 7th Division were initiated by 114 Indian Infantry Brigade, which was led by the 4th Battalion, 5 Royal Gurkha Rifles (Frontier Force) (4/5 GR). The battalion left Merema on 4 December 1944, and reached the area on 3 February 1945; it closed on the given objective at Pakokku on 5 February 1945, after C Company, under Major Beytagh, cleared the road. The Japanese shelled the troops from their positions in Kahnla, a village on the southern bank of the Irrawaddy.

On 5 February, three companies of 4/5 GR, led by Captain Fisher, Major I.M Brown MC* and the commanding officer, Lieutenant Colonel J H Turner, made an encircling move on the village of Kahnla. One company moved further left and attacked from northeast, after coming under intense Japanese attack, while a second company formed up in Kahnla village for the attack from west; with H-hour at 5:30 pm, it fought its way through and overran half of the Japanese position, including a strong Medium Machine Gun (MMG) bunker. Not less than 30 Japanese were killed and many more wounded, while two MMGs, three Light Machine Guns (LMGs) and twenty rifles were recovered. One of the battalion's wounded was CHM Bhagta Bahadur Gurung, whose outstanding courage and leadership in the attack later saw him awarded the Indian Order of Merit (IOM). Brown was awarded another Bar to his MC. These were two of the 41 major awards won by 4/5 GR during operations in Burma Theatre during World War II.

Further reconnaissance on 6 February indicated that the remainder of the objective was strongly held by the Japanese and on 7 February the 4th Battalion/1 Gurkha Rifles (4/1 GR) established a firm base for 4/5 GR. On 8 February, the Brown's company cleared another Japanese position, killing twelve and wounding three Japanese. The main attack planned for early morning hours of 10 February, was pressed without any aerial support due to bad weather. The attack began with one company moving forward with support from tanks from the 255th Indian Tank Brigade (Gordon Highlanders). By the afternoon, they had captured their objective. 4/5 GR suffered a significant loss during the battle when its commanding officer of the battalion was killed. Resistance by the Japanese position was fanatical; only one prisoner was taken and 51 bodies counted. During night 10 February 1945, the Japanese launched six unsuccessful counterattacks and on the night of 11/12 February 1945, they tried to infiltrate into 4/5 GR's position without success. On the night of 13 February, troops from 4/5 GR occupied positions closer to Pakokku Village, called Sinlan, then proceeded to search and occupy Pakokku itself. With this operation decimating nearly battalion strength of Japanese, the first stage of 7 Indian Infantry Division task was completed and foothold gained on the western bank of the Irrawaddy, for further operations. The operation was magnificent stroke of bravery and deception, making possible the next phase of offensive for the destruction of Japanese in Burma.

=== Irrawaddy River operations ===
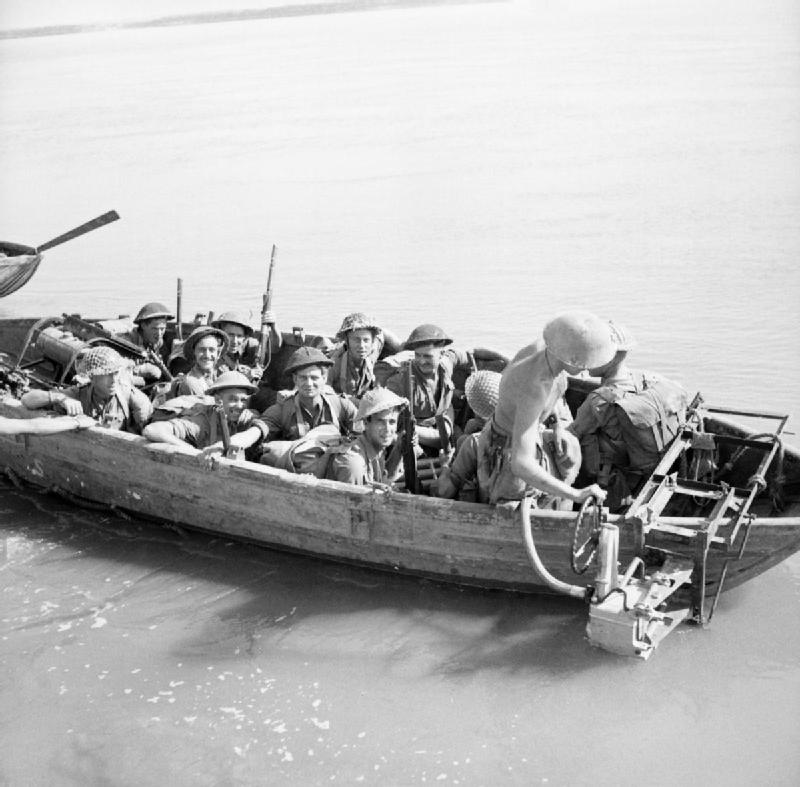
Men of the Dorset Regiment crossing the Irrawaddy River

After the 7th Indian Infantry Division had captured Pakokku, on 14 February, the Allied forces crossed the Irrawaddy River at Nyaung U, north of ancient Burmese capital of Pagan. The 7th Division's crossing was made on a wide front. Both the main attack at Nyaung U and a secondary crossing at Pagan (the former capital, and the site of many Buddhist temples) were initially disastrous. Pagan and Nyaungu were defended by two battalions of the Indian National Army's 4th Guerrilla Regiment, with one held in reserve. The 7th Indian Division suffered heavy losses as their assault boats broke down under machine-gun fire which swept the river. Eventually, support from tanks of the Gordon Highlanders firing across the river and massed artillery forced the defenders at Nyaungu to surrender. At Pagan, the defending troops, the INA's 9th Battalion took a heavy toll offering resistance to the (1/11th Sikh Regiment) before they withdrew to Mount Popa.

By 20 February, most of the forces crossed the river and captured Meiktila, as planned. The capture of Pakokku by 4/5 GR opened the way for further operations by the 17th Indian Infantry Division. On 19 February, 4/5 GR cleared an island, 5 miles (8.0 km) long and 3 miles (4.8 km) broad, in the Irrawaddy River, off Pakokku, which was interfering with forward movement.

On 24 February, the Gurkhas moved south of Pakokku, crossed Irrawaddy River and took over part of Nyaung U bridgehead. On 25 February, a squadron of the 116th Regiment RAC (Gordon Highlanders), part of the 255th Indian Tank Brigade, supported the assault of the battalion and the village was soon secured; seven Japanese, including one officer, were killed. Throughout the month of April, the Allies continued to engage the Japanese in the area and this led to the capture of Letse and Seikpyu. On the morning of 24 April, leading troops were pinned down with heavy fire from a ridge with a prominent Golden Pagoda and a monastery. The objective was captured by a company from 4/5 GR, under Captain G W Maycock, supported by a heavy artillery concentration. Thirty-nine Japanese bodies were recovered. By 30 April, 4/5 GR secured Pwinbu and then moved to clear the Japanese position at Pagan village. Between 5 and 8 May concerted assaults were launched on Japanese positions which formed a ring around the position from the south: on 6th, roadblock in the rear of the Japanese on 7th and assault launched on Pagan Village on 8th.

== Aftermath ==
While these subsidiary operations, minor in comparison, had been taking place west of the Irrawaddy River, the Battle of Mandalay had been fought out. The Japanese had been decisively and finally beaten. The Japanese Army in Burma except for those troops still east of Sittang River had ceased to exist as an organised and integrated force. On 2 May 1945 Rangoon had been reoccupied and General Slim's plans had been brought to a triumphant conclusion. The monsoon was about to break and the next phase was to be a large scale mopping up operation. On 14 May, 4/5 GR left Pagan for what it hoped would be a fairly permanent monsoon location. After several changes of location, it arrived at Allanmyo, 40 miles (64 km) north of Prome. Orders were soon received on 27 May to move to Prome for further operational tasks.

As a result of its involvement in this battle, the Battle Honour "Irrawaddy" was awarded to 4/5 GR.

== Bibliography ==
- Fay, Peter W. (1993). The Forgotten Army: India's Armed Struggle for Independence, 1942-1945. Ann Arbor: University of Michigan Press. ISBN 0-472-08342-2.
- Jon Latimer, Burma: The Forgotten War, London: John Murray, 2004 ISBN 0-7195-6576-6
- Brigadier Ratan Kaul's description of the Battle of Pakokku and the Irrawaddy River operations
