= Sōma (surname) =

- Pronunciation: [so̞ːma̠]

Origin
- Origin: Japanese
- Region of origin: Japan
- Derived from Sōma District, Shimōsa Province (now Ibaraki Prefecture and Chiba Prefecture)

Sōma, Soma, Souma or Sohma (written: 相馬) is a Japanese surname. Notable people with the surname include:

- Aizō Sōma (相馬 愛蔵; 1870–1954), Japanese entrepreneur, philanthropist, patron of artists
- Keisuke Sohma (相馬 圭祐; born 1986), Japanese actor
- Kokkō Sōma (相馬 黒光; 1876–1955), Japanese entrepreneur, philanthropist, patron of artists
- Naoki Soma (相馬 直樹; born 1971), Japanese footballer
- Takahito Soma (相馬 崇人; born 1981), Japanese footballer
- Tomokazu Soma (相馬 朋和; born 1977), Japanese rugby union player
- Yuki Soma (相馬 勇紀; born 1997), Japanese footballer
- Yukika Sohma (相馬 雪香; 1912–2008), Japanese scholar and the founder of the Association for Aid and Relief

== Fictional characters ==
- Sohma family, characters from the manga series Fruits Basket
- Mitsuko Souma (相馬 光子), a character in the manga series Battle Royale

== See also ==
- Sōma clan
