= Aizō Sōma =

Japanese businessman and philanthropist (1870–1954)

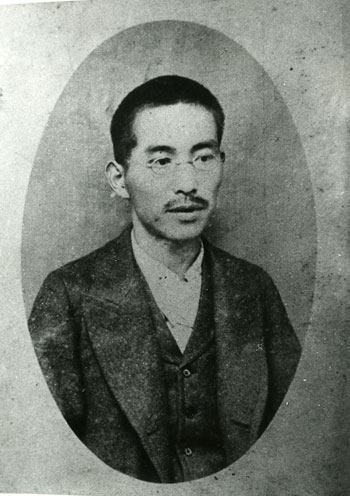
- Born: November 8, 1870; Azumino, Nagano, Japan
- Died: February 14, 1954 (aged 83); Tokyo, Japan
- Occupations: Businessman, philanthropist, entrepreneur, social activist
- Known for: Founding Nakamuraya Co., Ltd.
- Spouse: Kokkō Sōma
- Relatives: Rash Behari Bose (son-in-law)

Aizō Sōma (相馬愛蔵, Sōma Aizō; November 8, 1870 – February 14, 1954) was an entrepreneur, philanthropist, patron of the arts, and advocate of Pan-Asianism in the Empire of Japan. He is known as the founder of Nakamura-ya, a noted bakery in Tokyo.

== Biography ==
Sōma was born in a wealthy farming family in what is now Azumino, Nagano. He came to Tokyo at the age of 17 in order to enter Waseda University in 1886, entering the Tokyo Professional College which had just been founded. His professors included Tsubouchi Shōyō and Tameyuki Amano. Later, he studied with Sokichi Tsuda, a Japanese historian who became a professor at Waseda University. During this time, he was also converted to Christianity by Uchimura Kanzō, and became friends with Taguchi Ukichi.

He graduated in 1890, and travelled to Hokkaido, where he studied sericulture at the Sapporo Agricultural College, and returned to Nagano to conduct experiments in the improvement of silkworms. He also founded a temperance movement in Azumino, which drew the wrath of locals for its aggressive approach against drinking and brothels. He also met with foreign missionaries, and established a local orphanage.

In 1898, Sōma married Kokkō, the daughter of an ex-samurai from Sendai, which he had visited in order to raise funds for the orphanage. His wife had frequent problems with her health and with adjusting to rural life, and the couple relocated to Tokyo in 1901. In Tokyo, Sōma purchased the Nakamura-ya bakery near the main gate to Tokyo Imperial University. He is credited with inventing the kurimu-pan, a bun with custard inside. In 1909, he moved the shop to Shinjuku. He often hired foreigners or consulted with foreign residents in Japan for ideas on new products or new condiments to use in his bakery items. He also established a school to teach commercial morality and to improve on the service standards of his employees. The shop flourished, and he added a café and restaurant as well.

Sōma became a patron of the arts and literature by organizing a literary salon, and by providing financial support to struggling artists and writers. Members of the salon included Naoe Kinoshita, a socialist activist from Sōma’s home town, Vasili Eroshenko, a blind Russian poet, as well as actress Sumako Matsui, painter Tsune Nakamura, and sculptor Rokuzan Ogiwara.

Sōma also provided support to the pan-Asian movement, and his salon provided a convenient and confidential meeting place for politicians, including Toyama Mitsuru, Inukai Tsuyoshi and others. Sōma provided shelter for Rash Behari Bose, the fugitive head of the Indian independence movement. Bose was the mastermind behind a number of bomb plots against the Viceroy of India and attempts to organize an uprising against the British Raj. Bose married Sōma’s daughter Toshiko in 1918.

Sōma died in 1954.
