= Obukhovka =

Obukhovka may refer to:

- Obukhovka, Kazakhstan, a village in the Almaty Province, Kazakhstan
- Obukhovka, Russia, name of several rural localities in Russia
