= Nakamura Tsune =

Japanese painter (1887–1924)

- 中村彝
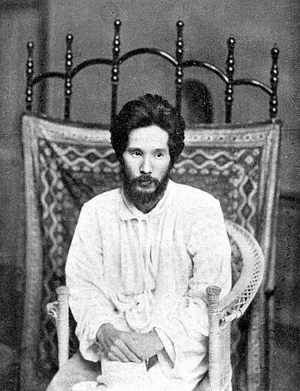
- Nakamura Tsune
- Born: July 3, 1887; Mito City, Ibaraki, Japan
- Died: December 24, 1924 (aged 37); Shimo-Ochiai, Shinjuku, Japan
- Resting place: Gion-ji in Mito; 36.3891297°N 140.4567018°E
- Education: Nagoya Army Cadet School; Research Institute of the White Horse Society; Research Institute of the Pacific Western Painting Society
- Notable work: Girl (小女)
- Memorials: Shinjuku Nakamura Tsune Atelier Memorial Museum

Nakamura Tsune (中村彝) (3 July 1887 – 24 December 1924) was a Japanese yōga painter best known for his portraits of Sōma Toshiko, including Girl (1914).

== Life ==
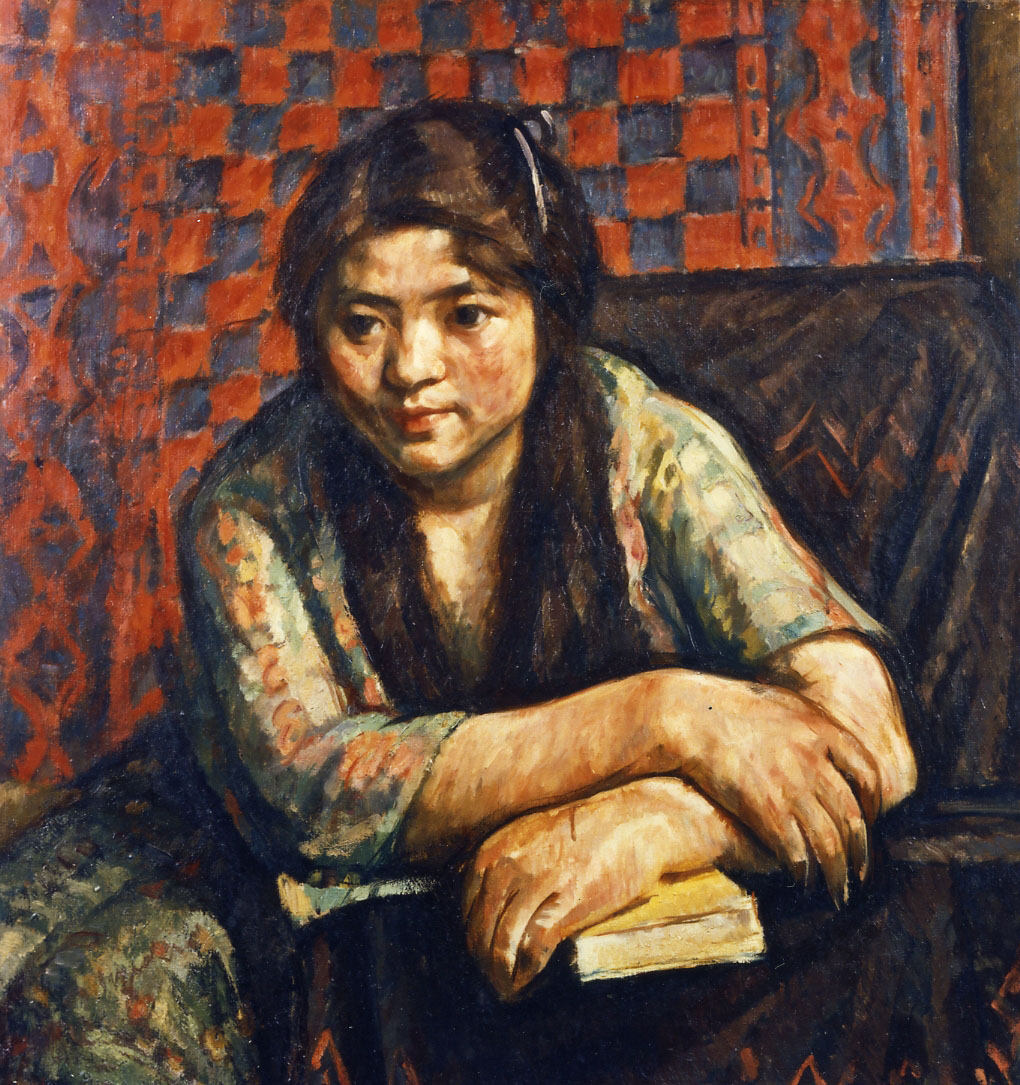
Girl (小女), awarded third prize at the eighth Bunten exhibition in 1914

Nakamura Tsune was born in 1887 in what is now Mito City, into a family that had served as samurai in the Mito domain. His father died the following year, his mother when he was eleven. He graduated from the Nagoya Army Cadet School (名古屋陸軍地方幼年学校) in 1904 but was forced to abandon his plans for a career as a soldier after contracting tuberculosis.

While recuperating, he developed aspirations to become a painter, and in 1906 joined the Research Institute of the White Horse Society (白馬会研究所), before moving the following year to the Research Institute of the Pacific Western Painting Society (太平洋画会研究所). That same year he was baptised. In 1908 he began to socialize with artists including Ogiwara Rokuzan at the Nakamura-ya (中村屋) Atelier in Shinjuku. Two of his works, Cloudy Morning and Cliffs (now in the Museum of the Imperial Collections) featured in the Third Bunten Exhibition in 1909, the latter receiving a commendation.

In 1911 he moved into a studio behind the Nakamura-ya. The following year haemoptysis began. In 1913 Sōma Toshiko, daughter of Aizō and Kokkō, became his model. In 1914, Girl won a prize at the Eighth Bunten Exhibition. Later that year he visited Izu Ōshima. In 1915 his petition for the hand of Toshiko in marriage was opposed by her parents (she went on to marry Rash Behari Bose). In 1916 he built a studio in Shimo-Ochiai (下落合) in Shinjuku and exhibited Dr. Tanakadate and Nude at the Eleventh Bunten Exhibition. His Portrait of Vasili Eroshenko was exhibited at the Second Teiten Exhibition in 1920.

In December 1924 at the age of 37 he died in his studio in Shimo-Ochiai. His remains were interred at Gion-ji (祇園寺) in Mito the following year.

== Shinjuku Nakamura Tsune Atelier Memorial Museum ==
The Shinjuku Nakamura Tsune Atelier Memorial Museum (新宿区立中村彝アトリエ記念館) opened in Shinjuku in 2013. Admission to the museum is free.

== Gallery ==
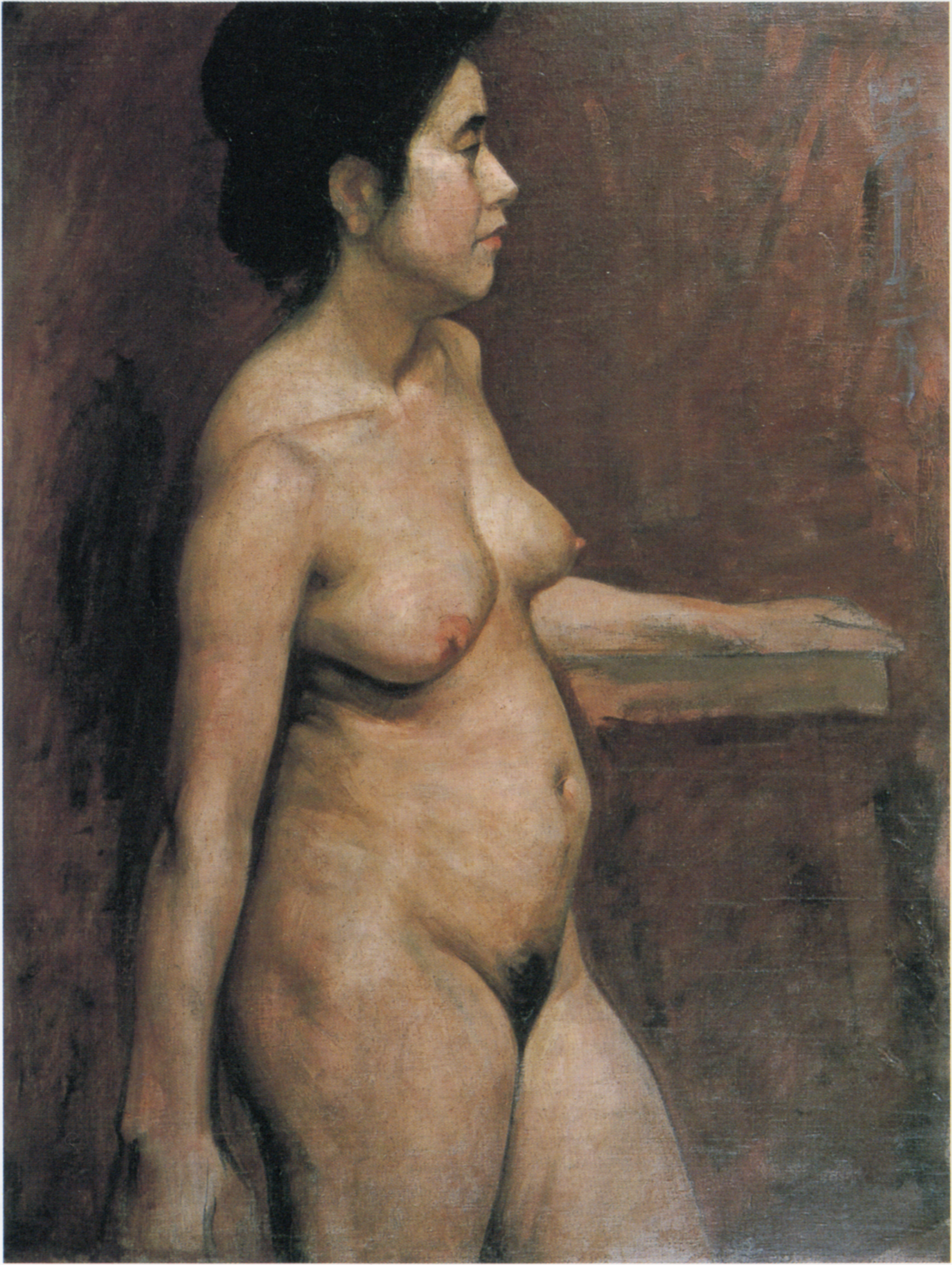
Study for Female Nude, 1908

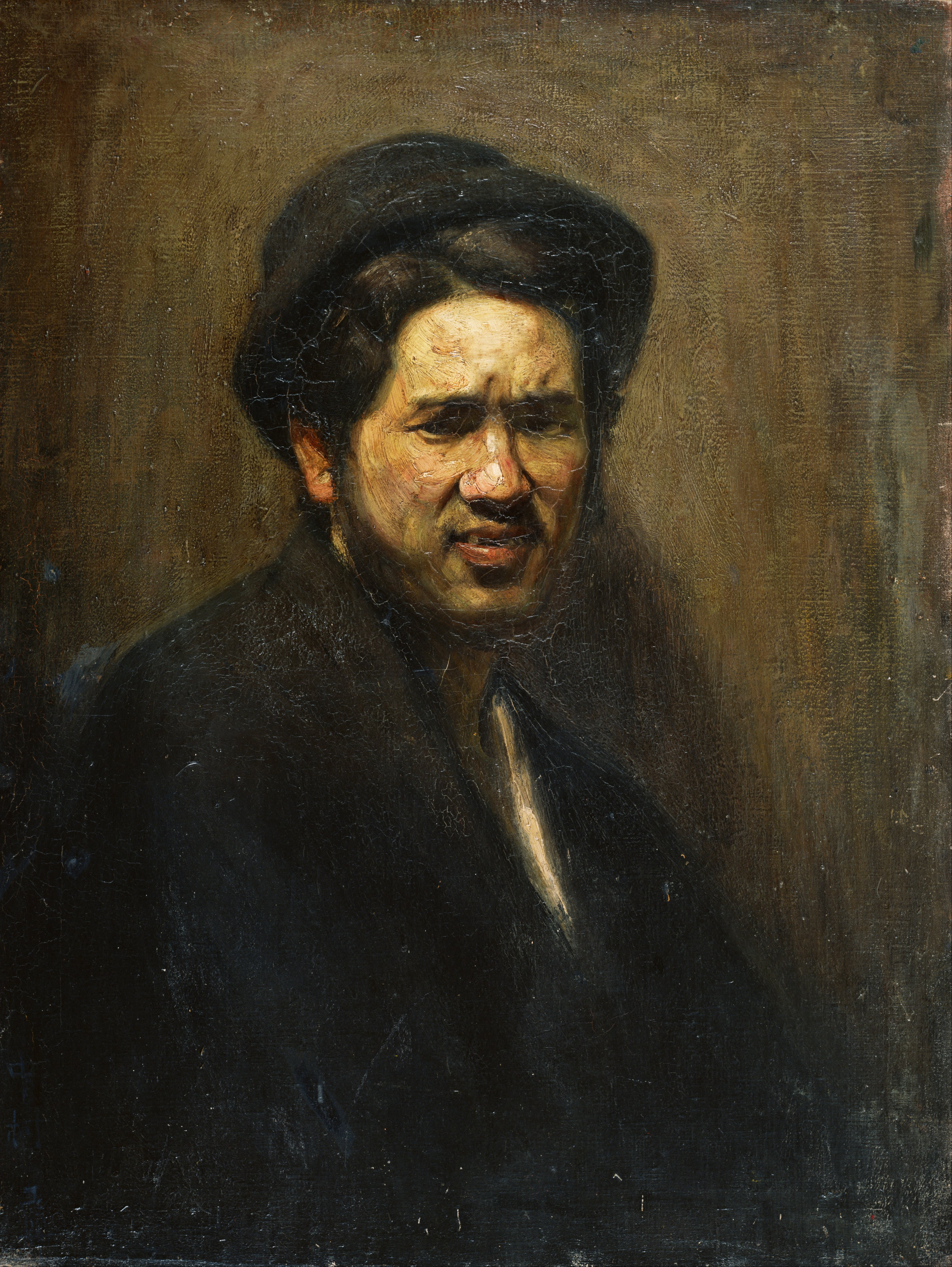
Self-Portrait, 1909

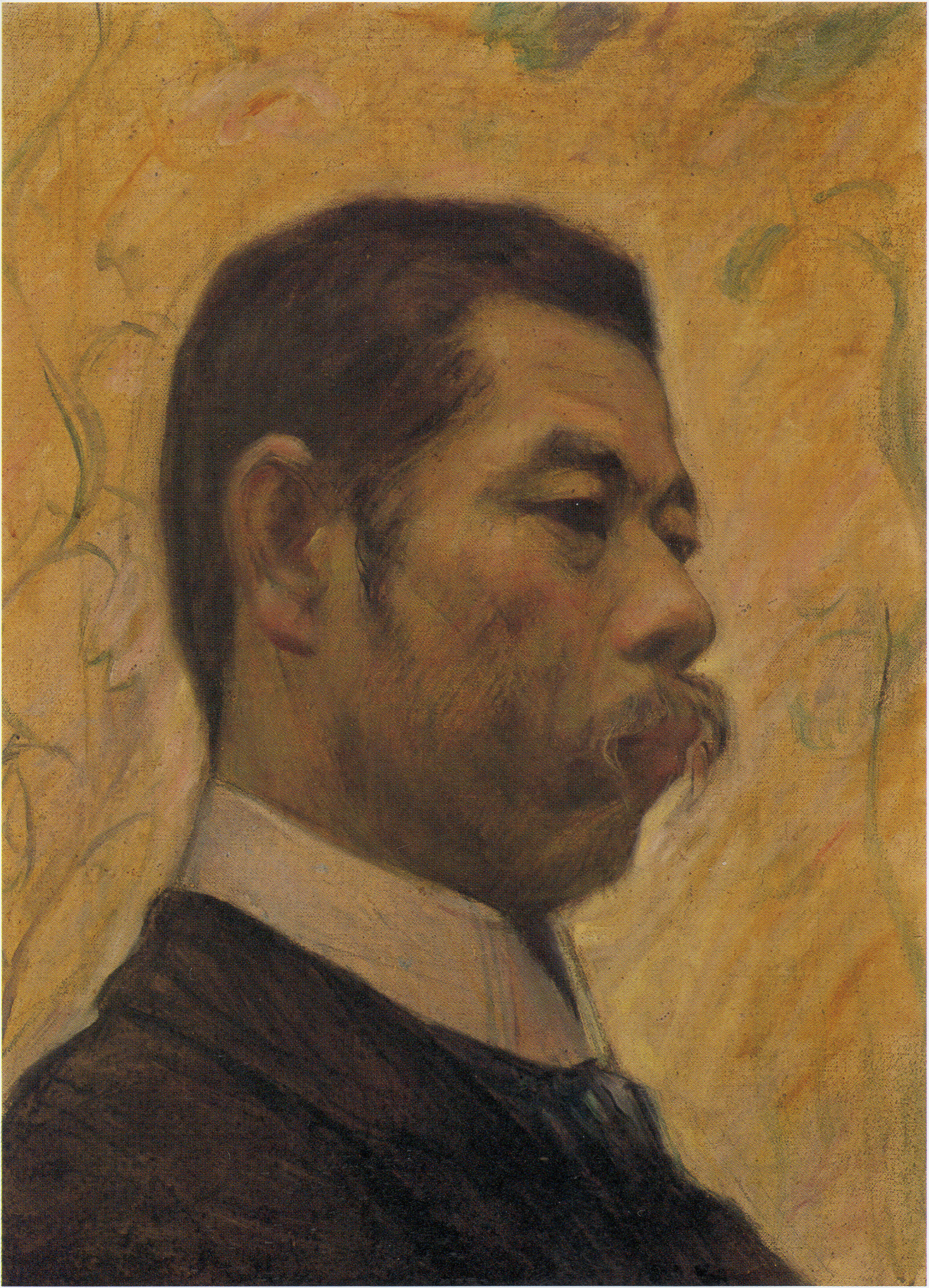
Portrait of Tago Mitsutoshi, 1912

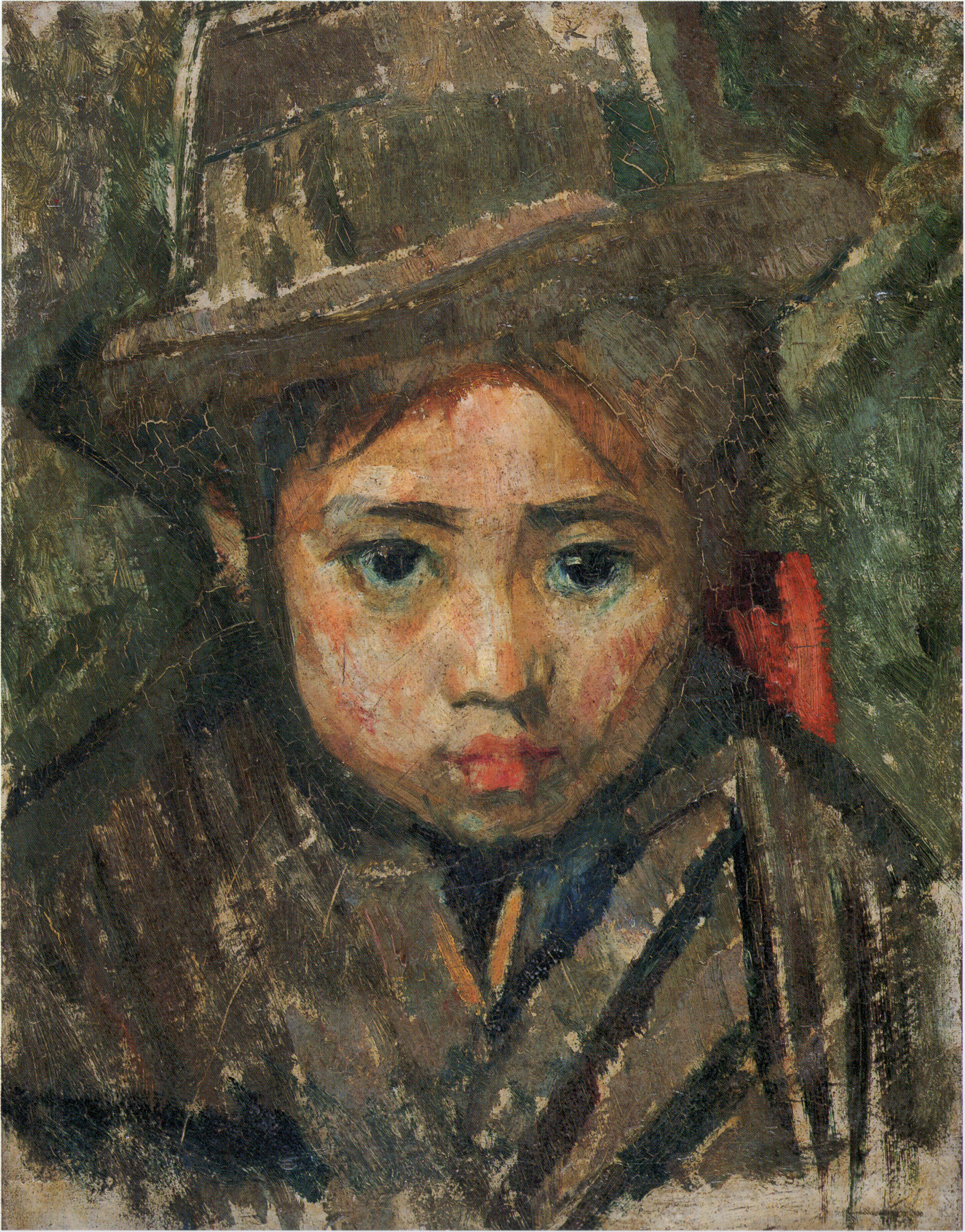
Girl with a Hat, 1912

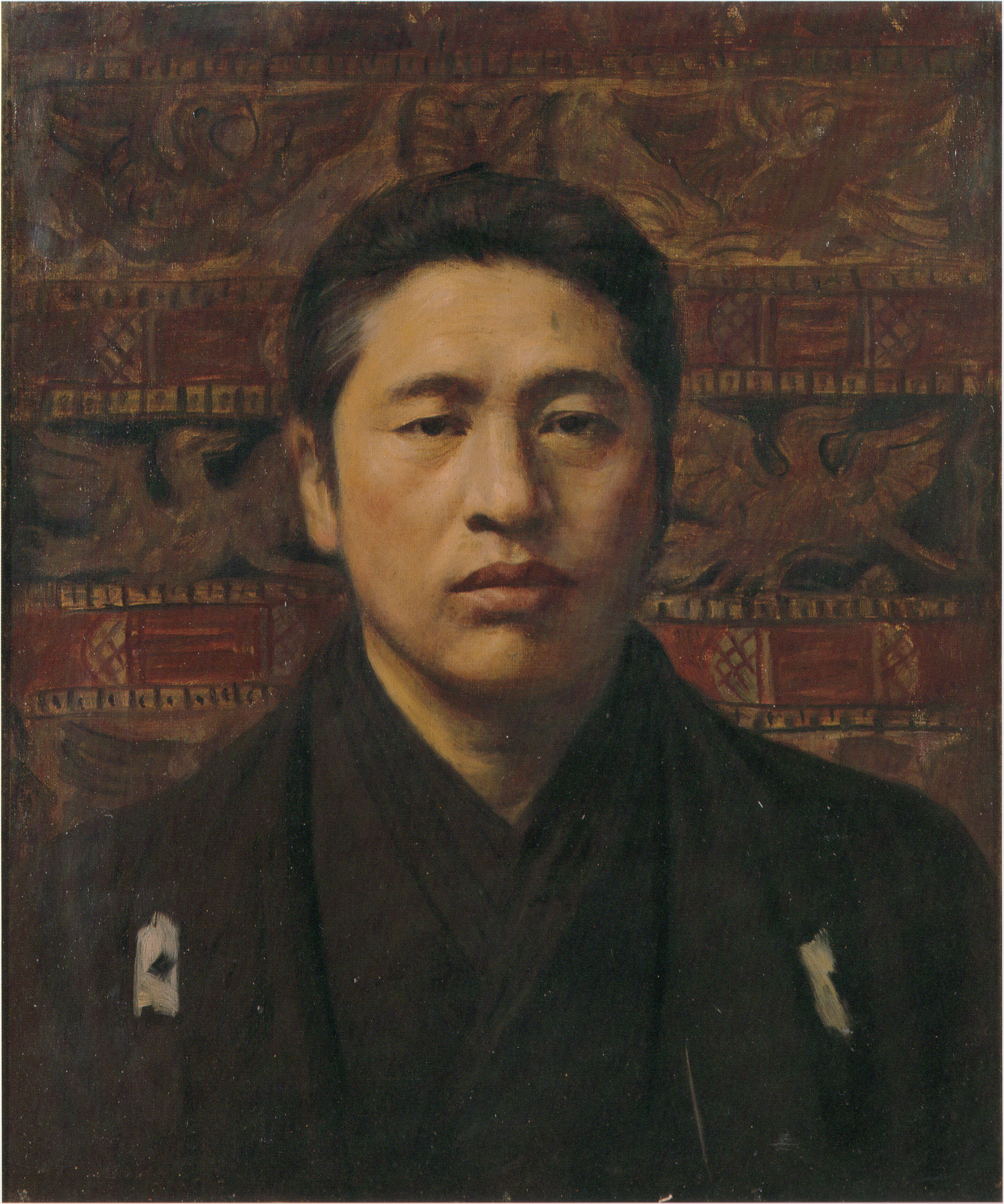
Portrait of Mr. I's Father, 1913

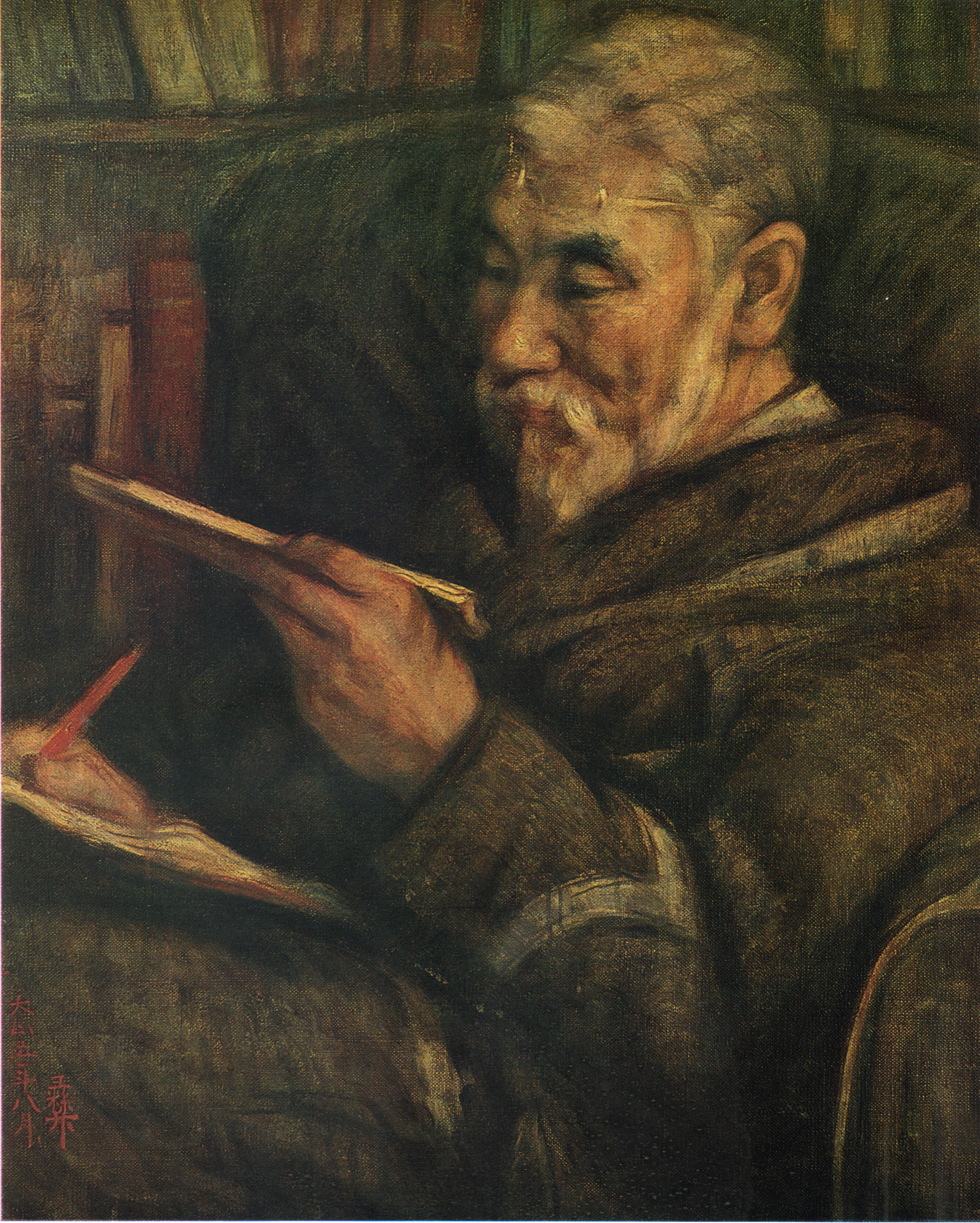
Portrait of Tanakadate Aikitsu, 1916

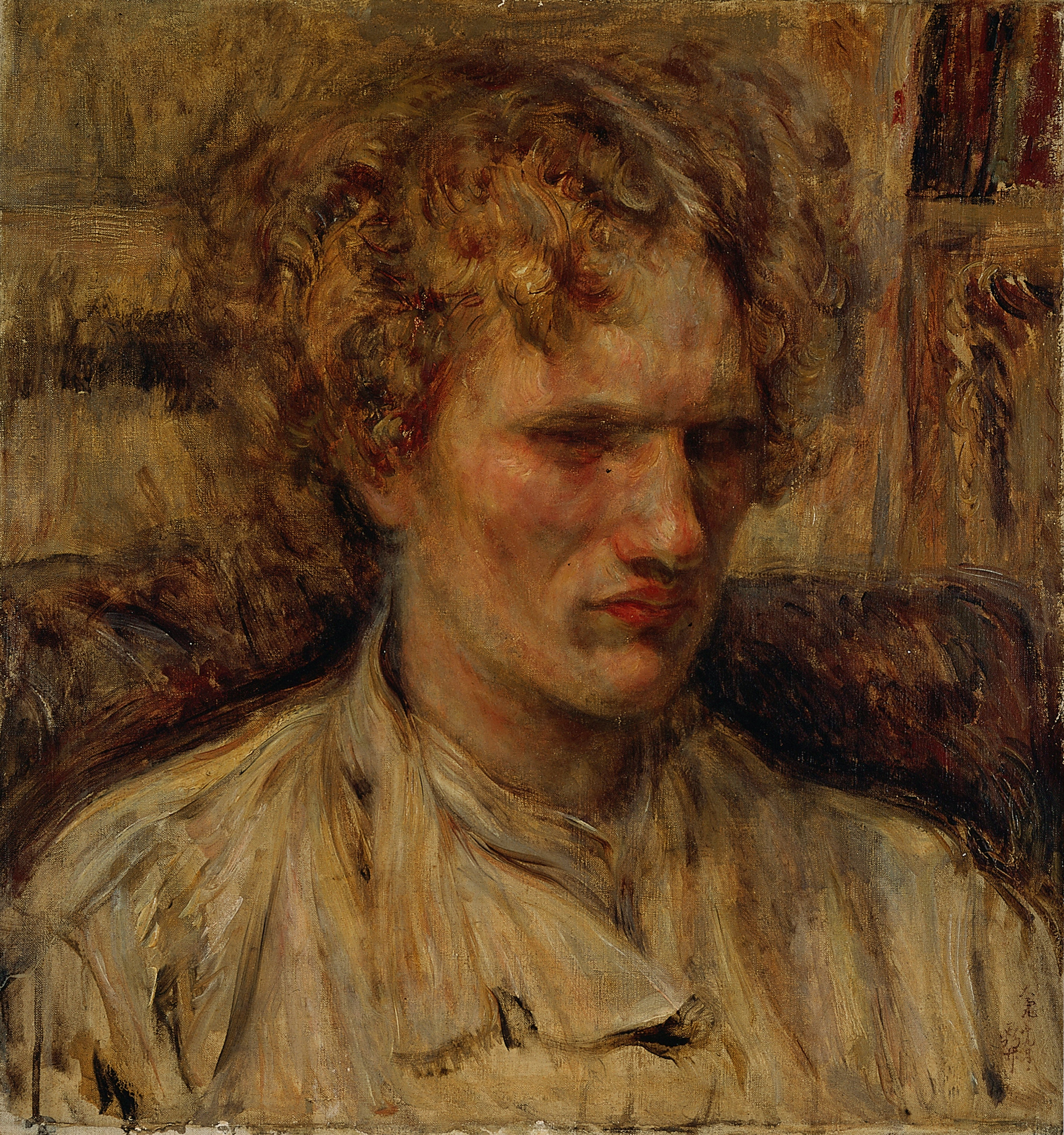
Portrait of Vasili Eroshenko, 1920

== See also ==
- List of Yōga painters
