= Ogihara =

Ogihara (written: 荻原 lit. "Miscanthus sacchariflorus field") is a Japanese surname. Notable people with the surname include:

- Eri Ogihara (荻原 詠理; born 2003), Japanese curler
- Hideki Ogihara (荻原 秀樹; born 1972), Japanese voice actor
- Keisuke Ogihara (荻原 イルマリ 恵介; born 1975), Japanese musician
- Kumiko Ogihara, Japanese curler and coach
- Morie Ogihara (荻原 守衛; 1879–1910), Japanese sculptor
- Ryo Ogihara (荻原 諒; born 1987), Japanese curler

Ōgihara, Oogihara, Ougihara or Ohgihara (written: 扇原) is a separate Japanese surname, though both may be transliterated the same way. Notable people with the surname include:

- Takahiro Ogihara (扇原 貴宏; born 1991), Japanese footballer
