= Kokkō Sōma =

Japanese businesswoman, philanthropist, and political activist (1876–1955)

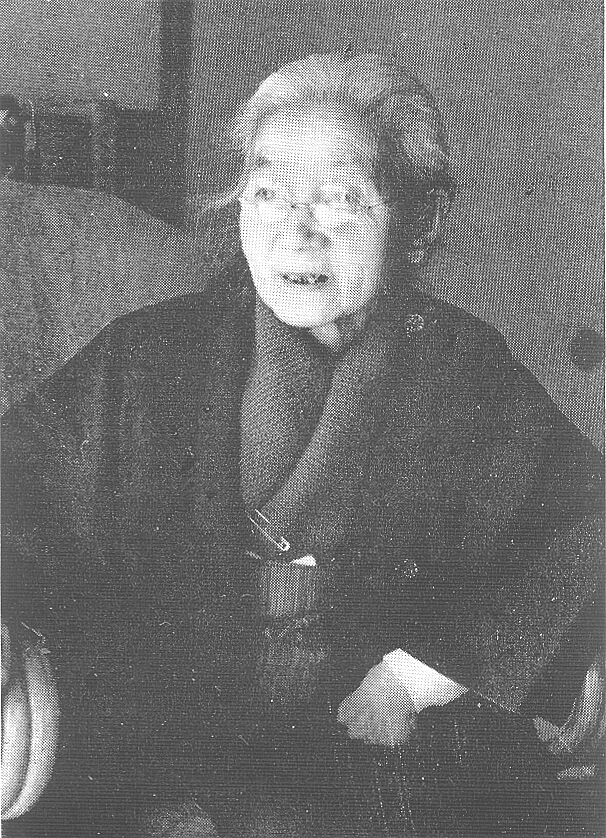
- Born: September 12, 1876; Sendai, Miyagi, Japan
- Died: March 2, 1955 (aged 78); Tokyo, Japan
- Occupations: Businesswoman, philanthropist, entrepreneur, social activist
- Known for: Founding Nakamuraya Co., Ltd.
- Spouse: Aizō Sōma
- Relatives: Rash Behari Bose (son-in-law)

Kokkō Sōma (相馬黒光, Sōma Kokkō; September 12, 1876 – March 2, 1955) was an entrepreneur, philanthropist, patron of artists and patron of Pan-Asian politics during the pre-war Empire of Japan. She was the wife of Aizō Sōma, the founder of Nakamura-ya, a noted bakery in Tokyo.

== Biography ==
Sōma was born as Hoshi Ryō (星良). Her father was a samurai in the service of Sendai domain, and her mother was a scholar of Chinese classical literature. She came into contact with Christianity through missionaries at an early age, and was sent to the Ferris Girls' School in Yokohama, and later transferred to the Meiji Girls' School in Kojimachi, Tokyo, where she studied under Hoshino Tenchi, Kitamura Tokoku and Tōson Shimazaki. She was given the pen name of Kokko by one of her teachers, with the cautionary note that for women authors, only a moderately shining light would be considered acceptable by society. In 1898, she married Aizō Sōma, a fellow Christian, and moved to what is now Azumino, Nagano, where her husband was combining social activism with sericulture.

However, she had frequent problems with her health and with adjusting to rural life, and the couple relocated to Tokyo in 1901. In Tokyo, Sōma purchased the Nakamura-ya bakery near the main gate to Tokyo Imperial University. In 1909, the shop relocated to Shinjuku. The bakery often hired foreigners or consulted with foreign residents in Japan for ideas on new products or new condiments to use, and the shop flourished, later adding a café and restaurant.

From 1908, Rokuzan Ogiwara, a sculptor and acquaintance of her husband, returned from studying under Rodin in Paris, returned to Japan and the Sōmas built an atelier for him adjacent to their shop. This was the start of the Sōmas patronage of the arts and literature. The atelier grew to become a literary salon, whose members included Naoe Kinoshita, a socialist activist from Sōma's home town, Vasili Eroshenko, a blind Russian poet, as well as actress Sumako Matsui, painter Tsune Nakamura, poet and sculptor Kōtarō Takamura.

In addition to providing financial support to struggling artists and writers, the Somas also provided support to the pan-Asian movement, and the salon provided a convenient and confidential meeting place for politicians, including Toyama Mitsuru, Inukai Tsuyoshi and others. The Sōmas provided shelter for Rash Behari Bose, the fugitive head of the Indian independence movement. Bose was the mastermind behind a number of bomb plots against the Viceroy of India and attempts to organize an uprising against the British Raj. Bose married Sōma's daughter Toshiko in 1918. Sōma died in 1955.

== In popular culture ==
In the TV movie, Rokuzan no ai ("Rokuzan’s Love") aired by Tokyo Broadcasting System (TBS) in February 2007. Kokkō Sōma is played by Miki Mizuno, with the story line depicting a forbidden romance between Rokuzan Ogiwara (played by Hiroyuki Hirayama), with Kokkō becoming the model for Ogiwara’s famous sculpture, Woman.
