= Tanakadate Aikitsu =

Japanese physicist

Baron Tanakadate Aikitsu
- 田中舘 愛橘
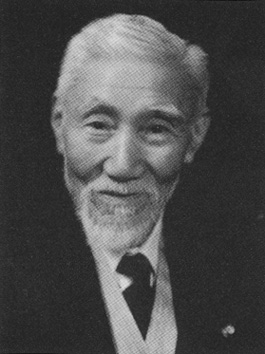

Member of the House of Peers
- In office 10 October 1925 – 2 May 1947 Nominated by the Emperor

Personal details
- Born: 18 September 1856 Ninohe, Mutsu, Japan
- Died: 21 May 1952 (aged 95) Setagaya, Tokyo, Japan
- Education: Keio-Gijuku University; Tokyo Imperial University; Glasgow University
- Scientific career
- Known for: Geophysics, aeronautics, Nihon-shiki romanization, metric system, founding institutions in Japan
- Workplaces: Tokyo Imperial University; University of Glasgow
- Academic advisors: Thomas Corwin Mendenhall; James Alfred Ewing

Baron Tanakadate Aikitsu (田中舘 愛橘; 18 September 1856 – 21 May 1952) was a Japanese physicist with diverse interests and effect. His given name was also written as Aikitu.

== Biography ==
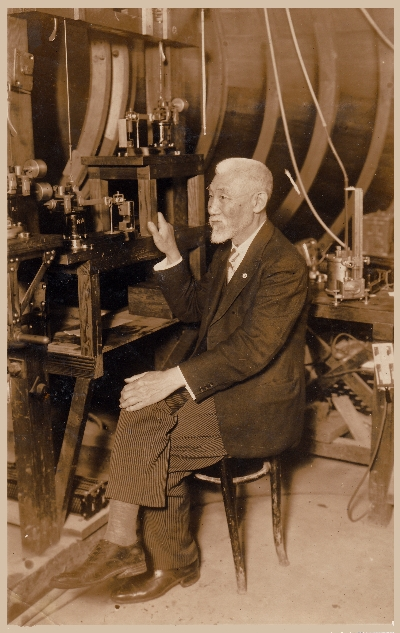
Tanakadate next to a wind tunnel at Tokyo Imperial University, 1951

Tanakadate was born in Fukuoka hamlet, in what is now part of the city of Ninohe in the northern Iwate Prefecture, Japan. He was the son of Tanakadate Inazo, a teacher of Jitsuyo, a martial art, and his wife, Kisei.

Tanakadate studied English at Keio-Gijuku University starting in 1884, and graduated from Tokyo Imperial University in 1882 with a degree in physics. He developed a way to write Japanese in the Latin alphabet called Nihon-shiki or Nippon-shiki in 1885, later becoming president of the Japanese Romanization Society. In the lead up to the World War II, he advocated directly for Nippon-shiki over Hepburn, eventually resulting in its adoption as the official Romanization standard by the wartime government. He visited Europe many times, and from 1888 to 1890 worked with Lord Kelvin at Glasgow University in Scotland, and with others in Berlin in Germany. Whilst in Scotland he was elected a Fellow of the Royal Society of Edinburgh. His proposers were Lord Kelvin, James Thomson Bottomley, James Alfred Ewing and Magnus Maclean.

Tanakadate travelled widely in Japan from 1893 to 1896, making a survey of gravity and geomagnetism for geophysical research with Cargill Gilston Knott. He founded the Institute of Seismology at Tokyo Imperial University. The International Latitude Observatory (sometimes called the Astro-Geodynamics Observatory) at Mizusawa was founded in 1899 as he had proposed.

Tanakadate was also an early proponent of military aviation. In the Russo-Japanese War, he was an advisor to the Imperial Japanese army on the use of hot air balloons for military reconnaissance purposes. This led to the establishment of an aviation laboratory at Tokyo Imperial University. At a 1907 conference in Paris on the metric system, Tanakadate saw a model of early fixed-wing airplane, and extended his stay in Paris to study further. In his Japanese laboratory he built a wind tunnel. Tanakadate published dozens of articles on aeronautics and aviation from 1910 to 1916 in both Japanese and in French. He appears to have been the most-published Japanese aeronautical scientist of that period. He founded a department on aviation at Tokyo University.

Tanakadate was the first Japanese member of the International Committee for Weights and Measures and helped arrange the official adoption of the metric system of weights and measures in Japan. From 1925 to 1947, he served as a member of the House of Peers of the Diet of Japan. In 1944, he was awarded the Asahi Prize.

He died in Tokyo on 21 May 1952.

Some of his papers are kept at Glasgow University.

== Recognition ==
- 1902 – Order of the Rising Sun, 4th class
- 1906 – Order of the Rising Sun, 2nd class
- 1916 – Grand Cordon of the Order of the Sacred Treasure
- 1944 – Order of Culture, Member
- 1952 – Grand Cordon of the Order of the Rising Sun (posthumous)

An asteroid, 10300 Tanakadate, was named for him in 1989. A commemorative postage stamp was issued in his honor in 2002.

== Gallery ==
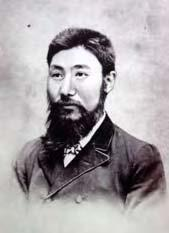
Tanakadate in 1890

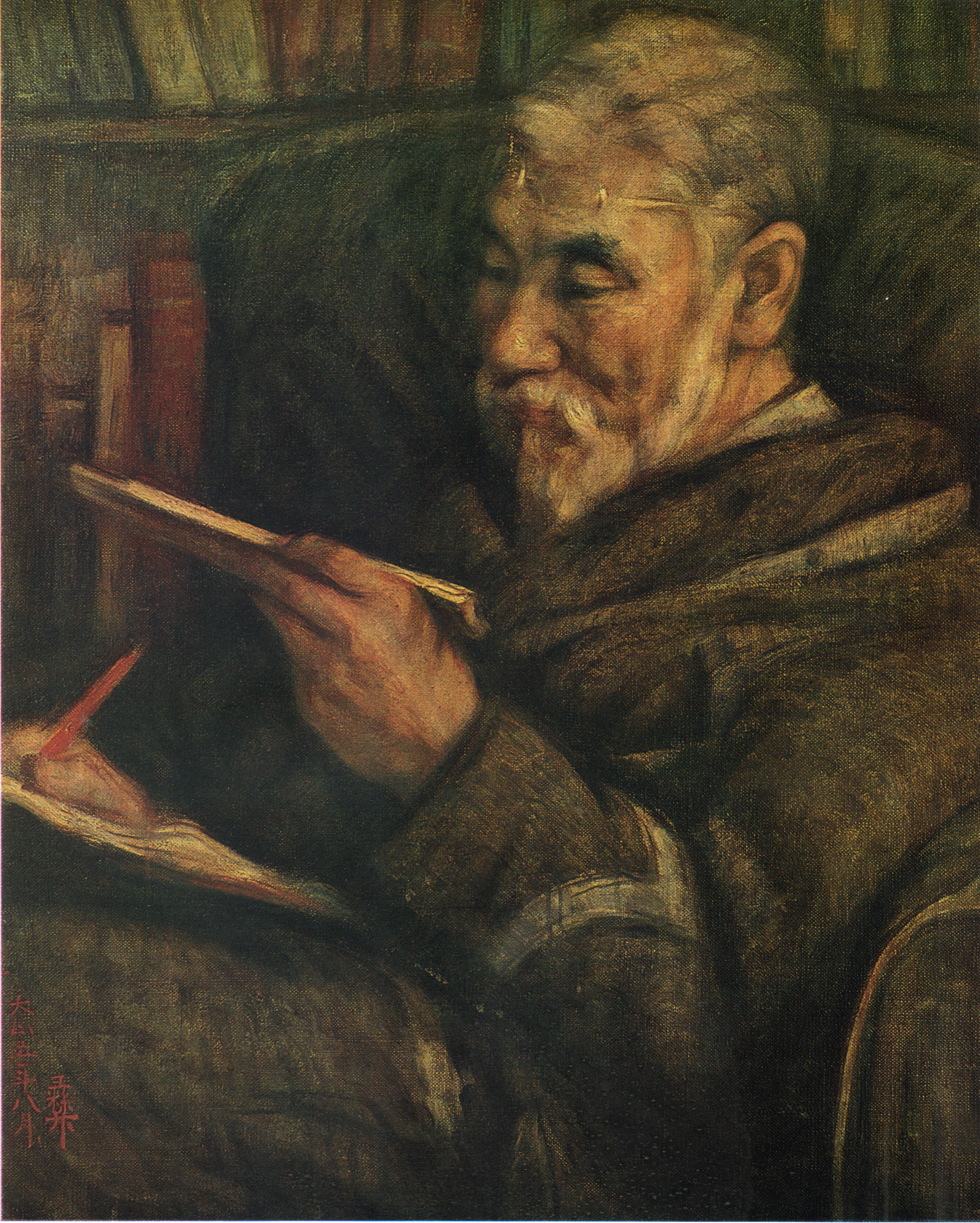
Portrait by Nakamura Tsune, 1916

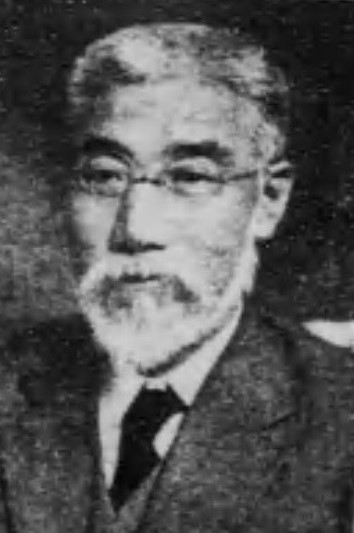

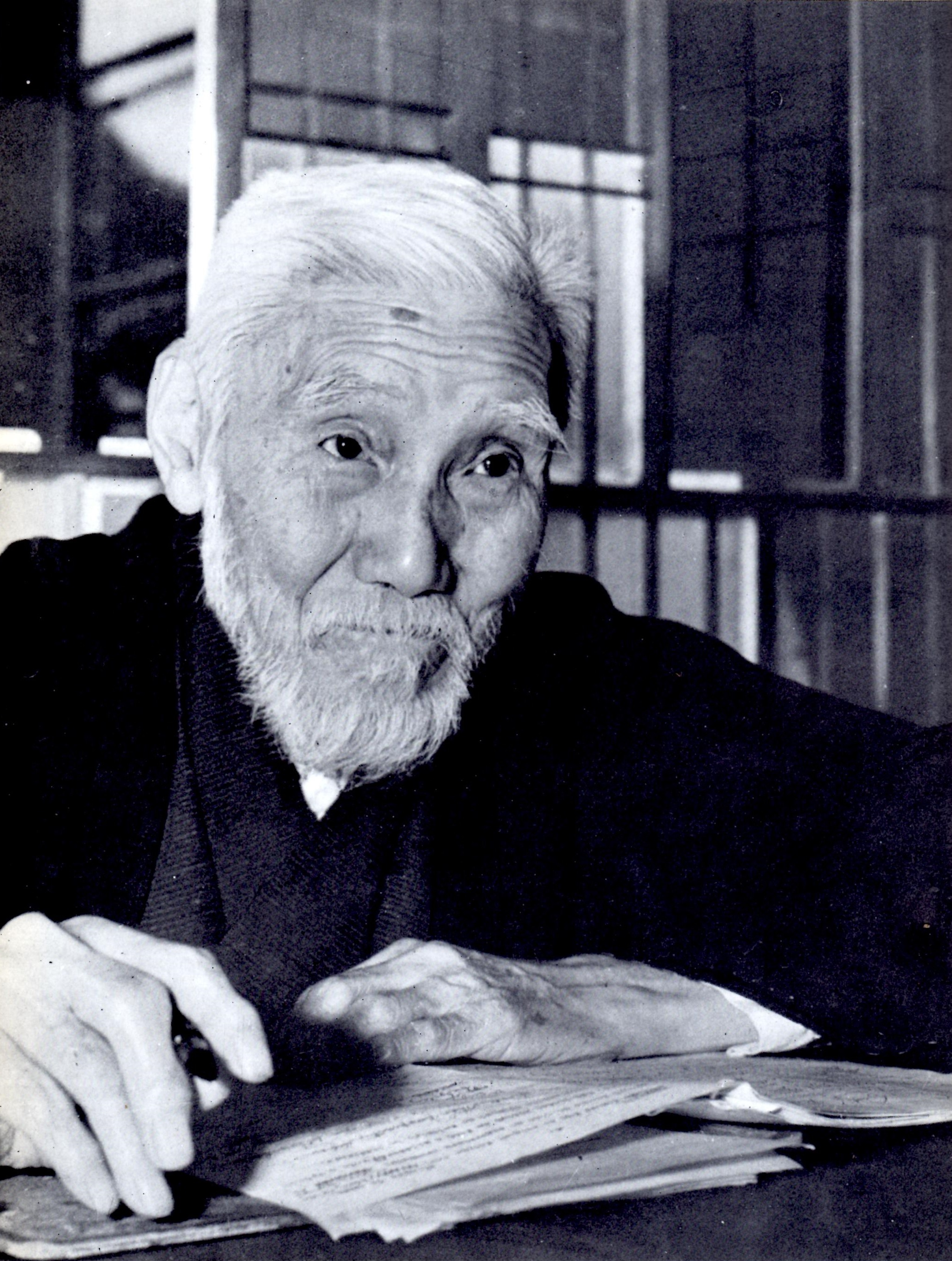
