= Japan Fine Arts Exhibition =

Japanese art exhibition

Coordinates: 35.6652°N 139.7263°E

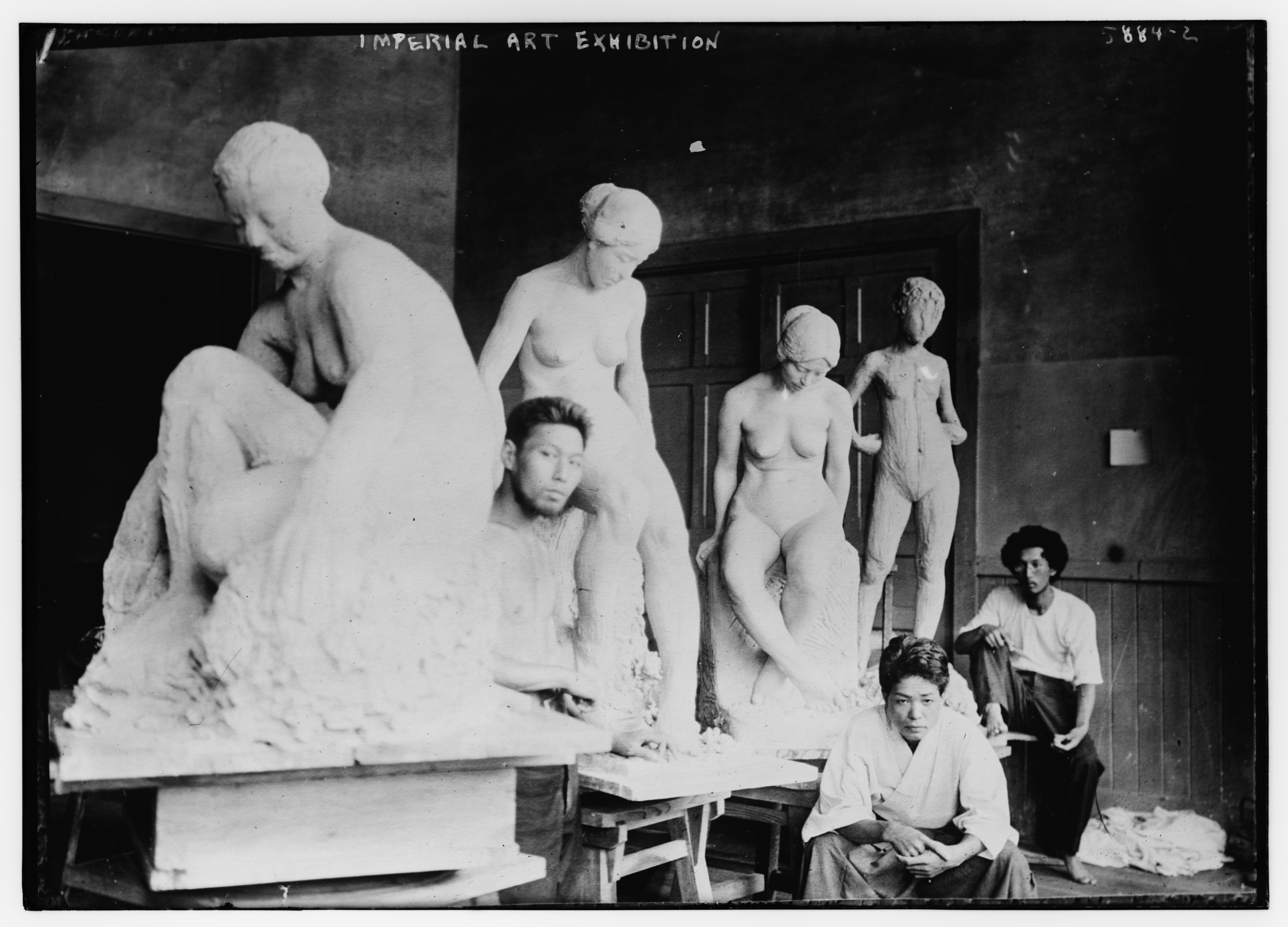
Japan Fine Arts Exhibition in 1907

The Japan Fine Arts Exhibition (日展, Nitten) is a Japanese art exhibition established in 1907. In formal documentation it is referred to as 日本美術展覧会 (Nihon bijutsu tenrankai), which has the same translation. The exhibition consists of five art faculties: Japanese-style and Western-style Painting, Sculpture, Craft as Art, and Calligraphy (書道, Shodō). During each exhibition, works of the great masters are shown alongside works of new but talented artists. It claims to be the largest combined art exhibition of its kind in the world and the most popular in Japan.

== Bunten ==
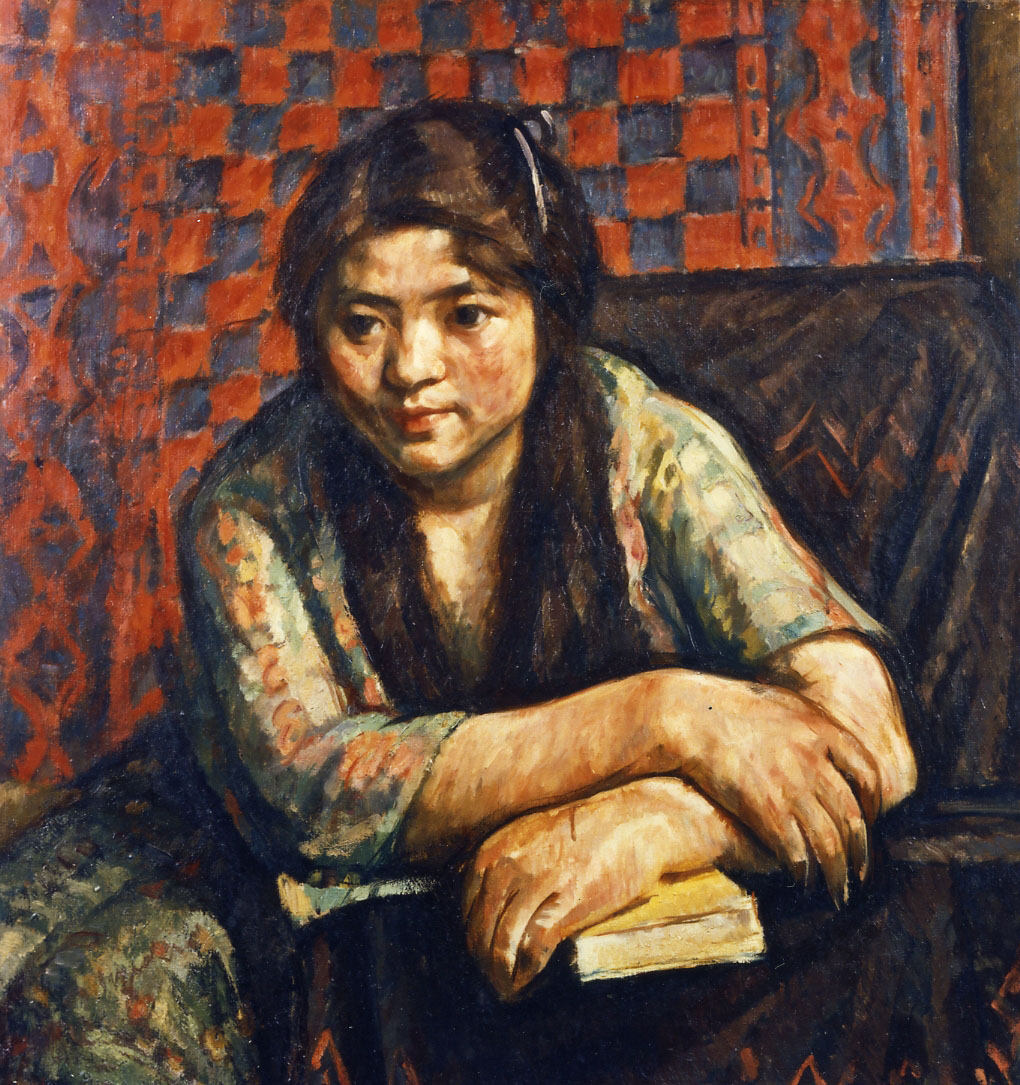
Girl (小女) by Nakamura Tsune, exhibited at the eighth Bunten in 1914 (Shinjuku Nakamura Tsune Atelier Memorial Museum)

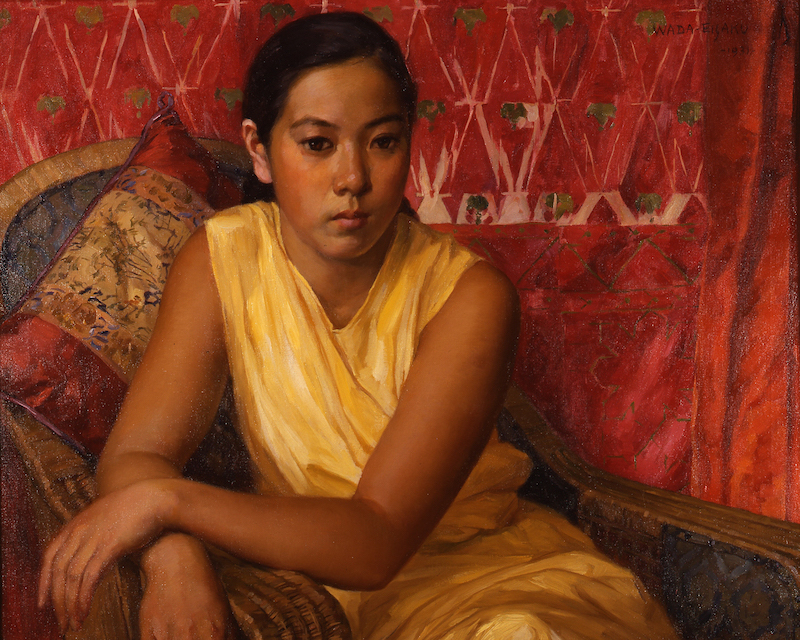
Girl in a Yellow Dress (黄衣の少女) by Wada Eisaku, exhibited at the twelfth Teiten in 1931 (Yamatane Museum)

In 1907, under the supervision of the Japanese Ministry of Education, Science, Sports and Culture, then called Mombushō (文部省), the first state art exhibition took place, the Monbushō Bijutsu Tenrankai (文部省 美術展 覧 会), abbreviated to "bunten" (文 展). It was held at the Tokyo Metropolitan Art Museum (東京都美術館; Tōkyō-to Bijutsukan). It had the three faculties: , and Sculpture.

Works were approved after being examined by a jury. The series of exhibitions took place twelve times under this name until 1918, with Japanese-style painting being divided into two sub-faculties for the 6th and 7th exhibitions.

== Teiten ==
From 1919, the series of exhibitions was subordinated to the Imperial Academy of Arts, the forerunner of today's Japan Art Academy, and was given the name “Teikoku Bijutsu Tenrankai” (帝国 美術展 覧 会), or “Teiten” (帝展) for short. With the exception of 1923 (due to the Great Kantō earthquake), it was carried out annually until 1934, fifteen times. From 1927, the exhibition was expanded to include the “faculty of Craft as Art” and the faculty for Western painting to include the “Subfaculties of Creative Woodblock Print”.

In 1935, according to a new regulation, the exhibitions of the Japanese Style Painting, Sculpture, and Craft as Art faculties were postponed and held the next year.

== Shin Bunten ==
From 1936, the Ministry of Culture took over the exhibition again, which was now divided into a regular and a special exhibition. It was carried out six times (not counting the special exhibition for the 2600th anniversary of the Tenno rule in 1940) under the name of "New Bunten" (新文展; Shinbunten) until 1943. Even in the war year 1944, an exhibition could be held despite the general exhibition ban.

== Nitten and Shin Nitten ==
After the end of the Pacific War, the exhibition was reopened by the Ministry of Culture in the spring of 1946, divided into the four faculties: Japanese Style Painting, Western Style Painting, Sculpture (woodcarving), and Craft as Art. From autumn of that year, it was continued as Nihon Bijutsu Tenrankai (日本 美術展 覧 会), or “Nitten” (日展) for short. In 1948, the Sho (calligraphy) faculty was added. In 1949, the exhibition from the 5th to the 13th Nitten came under the direction of the Japanese Academy of Arts.

In 1958, sponsorship of the Academy of the Arts was ended. The non-profit corporation Nitten was established, and the exhibition became a privately managed one. In 1969, there were structural changes.

In 2007, 100 years of the exhibition were celebrated, and the exhibition venue was changed to the National Art Center Tokyo (国立新美術館;Kokuritsu Shin-bijutsukan ) in Roppongi.

In 2012, after the reform of Public Interest Corporation System, the legal status of the Nitten was changed to a Public Interest Incorporated Association, like other non-profit corporations. In 2013, the Japan Fine Arts Exhibition decided not to award any of the top prizes in any of the five sections, following the revelation of fraudulent judging in the calligraphy section of the fiscal 2009 show. It was the first time since 1958 that none of the prizes were awarded.

In 2014, the structure was adjusted again, so that from then on it is referred to as the "New Nitten" (新 日 展; Shinnitten). In 2017, the 110th anniversary of the first exhibition was commemorated.
