= Obukhovka, Russia =

Obukhovka (Russian: Обуховка) is the name of several rural localities in Russia:

- Obukhovka, Belgorod Oblast, a selo in Starooskolsky District of Belgorod Oblast
- Obukhovka, Bryansk Oblast, a village in Kartushinsky Selsoviet of Starodubsky District of Bryansk Oblast
- Obukhovka, Bolshesoldatsky District, Kursk Oblast, a village in Volokonsky Selsoviet of Bolshesoldatsky District of Kursk Oblast
- Obukhovka, Glushkovsky District, Kursk Oblast, a village in Veselovsky Selsoviet of Glushkovsky District of Kursk Oblast
- Obukhovka, Kastorensky District, Kursk Oblast, a village in Uspensky Selsoviet of Kastorensky District of Kursk Oblast
- Obukhovka, Korenevsky District, Kursk Oblast, a selo in Obukhovsky Selsoviet of Korenevsky District of Kursk Oblast
- Obukhovka, Republic of Mordovia, a village in Apraksinsky Selsoviet of Chamzinsky District of the Republic of Mordovia
- Obukhovka, Nizhny Novgorod Oblast, a village in Verkhnetalyzinsky Selsoviet of Sechenovsky District of Nizhny Novgorod Oblast
- Obukhovka, Oryol Oblast, a village in Yarishchensky Selsoviet of Kolpnyansky District of Oryol Oblast
- Obukhovka, Azovsky District, Rostov Oblast, a khutor in Yelizavetinskoye Rural Settlement of Azovsky District of Rostov Oblast
- Obukhovka, Millerovsky District, Rostov Oblast, a khutor in Pervomayskoye Rural Settlement of Millerovsky District of Rostov Oblast
