= Vasili Eroshenko =

Anarchist writer, Esperantist, linguist and teacher (1890–1952)

Vasily Eroshenko
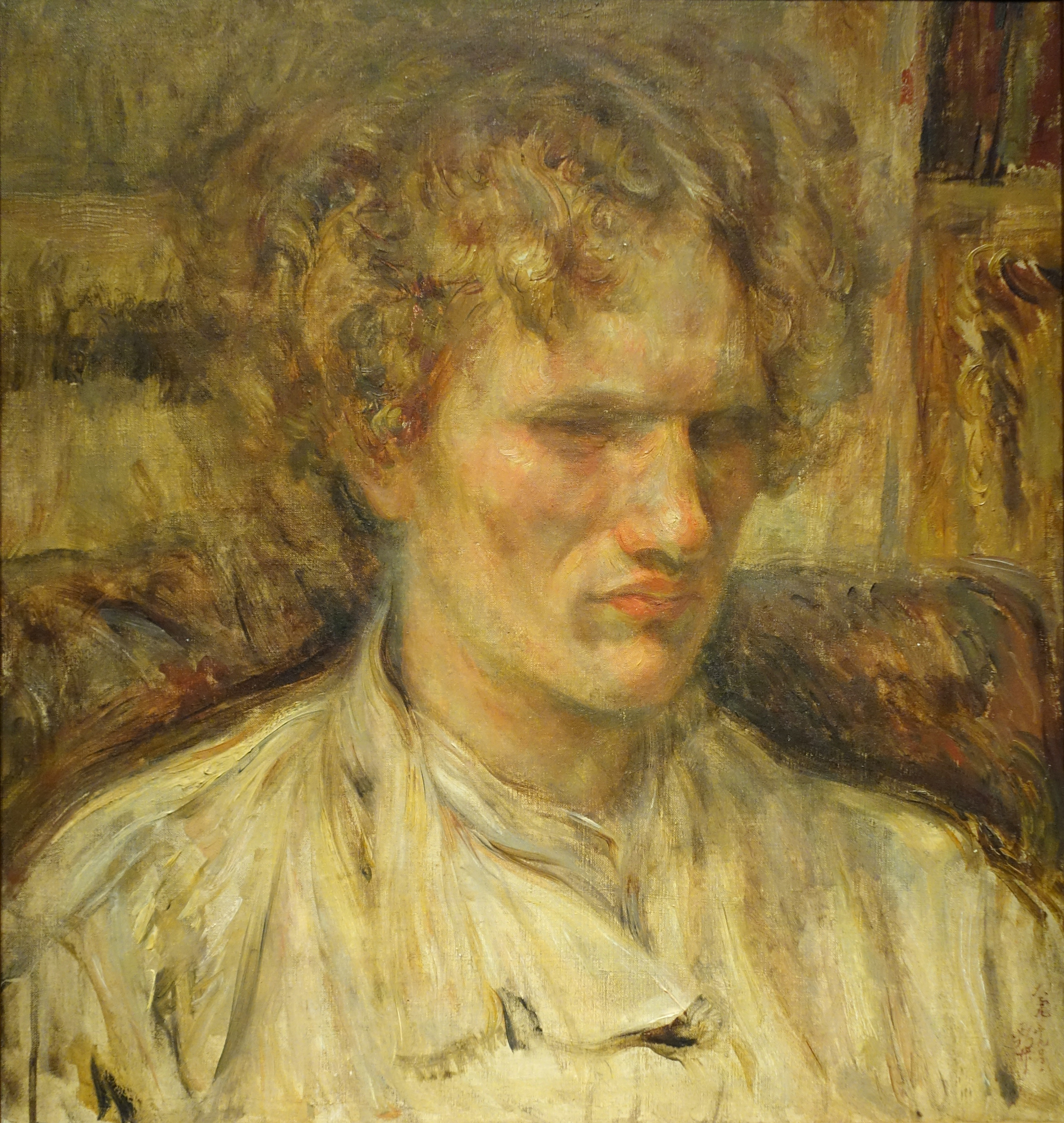
- Portrait by Nakamura Tsune at the National Museum of Modern Art, Tokyo (1920)
- Born: 12 January 1890; Obukhovka, Stary Oskol, Kursk Governorate, Russian Empire
- Died: 23 December 1952 (aged 62); Obukhovka, Stary Oskol, Kursk Oblast, Russian SFSR, Soviet Union

Vasili Yakovlevich Eroshenko (Russian: Василий Яковлевич Ерошенко; Ukrainian: Василь Якович Єрошенко) (12 January 1890 – 23 December 1952) was a blind writer, translator, esperantist, linguist, traveler, poet and teacher. He wrote in Esperanto and Japanese.

== Early life ==
At the age of four, he contracted measles and as a result, became blind.

== Career ==
From 1907 to 1914 he worked as a violinist for the Moscow orchestra for the blind. Around this time he studied Esperanto, as well as English. He travelled to Britain in 1912 and studied in a school for the blind. There he met the anarchist Peter Kropotkin, who likely influenced his anarchistic views. Later he went back to Moscow via Paris and resumed his work in the orchestra. There he began studying the Japanese language.

In April 1914 Eroshenko, due to contacts with the Japanese Esperantists, left for Japan. He studied massage in a school center for the blind in Tokyo, after learning their reputation in the practice. There he promoted Esperanto among the blind students. His first novels, in Japanese, were published there. After two years he went to Siam and tried to establish a school for the blind. But owing to the bureaucrats he did not succeed. He went to Burma, in Moulmein, and established a school for the blind. In November 1917, upon learning about the Russian Revolution, he went to India and hoped to return to Russia from there. He was arrested in Calcutta, as a Russian Bolshevik. In 1918 he went back to Burma and continued his work in Moulmein.

In hopes of returning to Russia for the second attempt he went back to India. British authorities then forbade him exit to his country and was placed under house arrest in Calcutta. He escaped arrest and went to Bombay, but later was caught and sent back to Calcutta. He provoked his departure from India. Under arrest he was boarded in a warship to be deported to Japan. He escaped from the ship when in Shanghai and from there successfully returned to Russia.

During the summer of 1919, he went back to Japan through Shanghai. With a good grasp on the Japanese language, Eroshenko wrote numerous children's stories in that language and became famous among the Japanese literary community. In May 1921 due to active participation in socialist protests and his participation in the second convention of the Japanese Socialist Party, Eroshenko was beaten up by the police and was arrested. A month later he was deported, and went to Vladivostok, Soviet Union.

From 1921 to 1923 Eroshenko went to China and lived in Harbin for more or less three months, then stayed in Beijing, China, where he taught Esperanto. From October 1921 to February 1922 he worked for the Institute of Languages in Shanghai. He was in contact with the Chinese writer Lu Xun, who translated a play and a collection of fairy tales by Eroshenko in Chinese. Eroshenko features in Lu's short story 'The Comedy of the Ducks'. He gave lectures to a university and a teacher's training school for women in Beijing on Russian literature and other themes.

In 1922 he participated in the 15th Esperanto Congress in Helsinki, Finland.

In 1923 Eroshenko left China and spent his remaining time in Europe.

In 1924 he participated in the 16th Esperanto Congress in Paris and the congress of blind Esperantists in Vienna.

From 1924 to 1927 he worked as a translator in the Communist University of the Toilers of the East. He translated works of Marx, Engels and Lenin into Japanese. In 1929-1930 he traveled to Chukotka and established a school for blind children. Due to the low number of enrollees this venture did not succeed.

From 1930 to 1932 he worked in a school for blind brush-makers in Nizhni Novgorod as a teacher in mathematics, Braille and the Russian language. A year later he went back to Moscow to work as proof reader in a printing house.

In 1935 he founded the first school for blind children in Kushka, Turkmenistan, where he remained until 1945. In 1946-1948 he worked as an English language instructor in a school for the blind children in Moscow. In 1949-1951 he lived and worked in an evening school for the blind in Tashkent. In 1952 he went back to Obukhivka, his birthplace, and worked on his last book. He died on 23 December and was buried in a country cemetery.
