= Bulaqty, Alakol District =

Bulaqty Бұлақты
- Village
- Location in Kazakhstan
- Coordinates: 46°11′43″N 81°06′10″E
- Country: Kazakhstan
- Region: Jetisu Region
- District: Alakol District

Population (2009)
  - Total: 3,740
- Time zone: UTC+6 (Omsk Time)

Bulaqty (Kazakh: Бұлақты, Būlaqty), previously Obukhovka, is a village in Jetisu Region, in south-eastern Kazakhstan.
