= Taguchi Ukichi =

Japanese economist and historian (1855–1905)

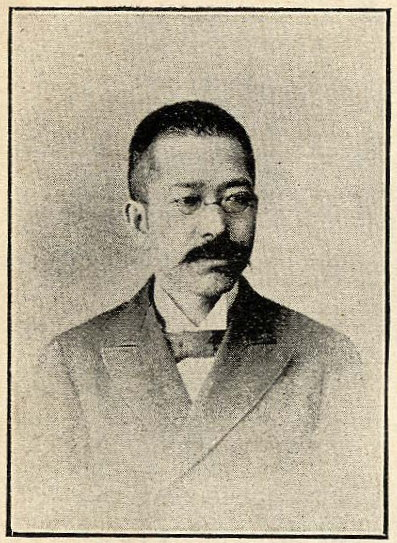
Taguchi c. 1898

Taguchi Ukichi (田口 卯吉; June 12, 1855 – April 13, 1905) was a Japanese historian and Georgist economist of the Meiji period, and one of the foremost proponents of the bunmeishi view of history. He was elected to the House of Representatives of Japan in 1894. He is sometimes referred to as "the Japanese Adam Smith", as he wrote many journal articles advocating certain economic reforms and policies.

== Biography ==
Perhaps Taguchi's most famous work is his Short History of Japanese Civilization (日本開化小史, Nippon kaika shōshi). He put forth one of the first, and most famous, bunmeishi versions of Japanese history, focusing on the Japanese people and their culture, rather than on the governments, and on the role of the people in the country's overall progress over the ages. This approach differed from that of so-called kokushi historians of the time, who focused on the governments, and on a nationalistic version of history, emphasizing the nation-state. Taguchi's approach also differed drastically from that of earlier histories, which praised individual historical figures and elevated them as heroes. Taguchi denounced this practice, and many other elements of Confucian moralist history, seeking to describe history as accurately and objectively as possible, eliminating the literary or mythological aspects of heroes and villains.

Taguchi also wrote a number of other historical texts, published collections of classical documents in large-scale print runs, many of which survive today, and edited a historical journal called Shikai (史海, "Ocean of History"). This journal would ignite a controversy in 1892 which would cost major kokushi historian Kume Kunitake his job.

Though his historical works were fairly thorough in their treatment of culture, technology, and other aspects of historical study, Taguchi's expertise was in economics. In addition to a number of texts on Japanese economic history, he founded an economics journal, Tokyo Economics Magazine (東京経済雑誌, Tōkyō keizai zasshi), and proposed a number of plans for the reform and restructuring of Japan's economy in the wake of the Meiji Restoration.

In his work ‘Nihon jinshu ron’ (On the Japanese Race) from 1898 he proposed that the Japanese race was part of the Aryan race and was superior not only to the Chinese race but also superior to the other Aryan races.
