= Tameyuki Amano =

Japanese politician, educator, economist (1861–1938)

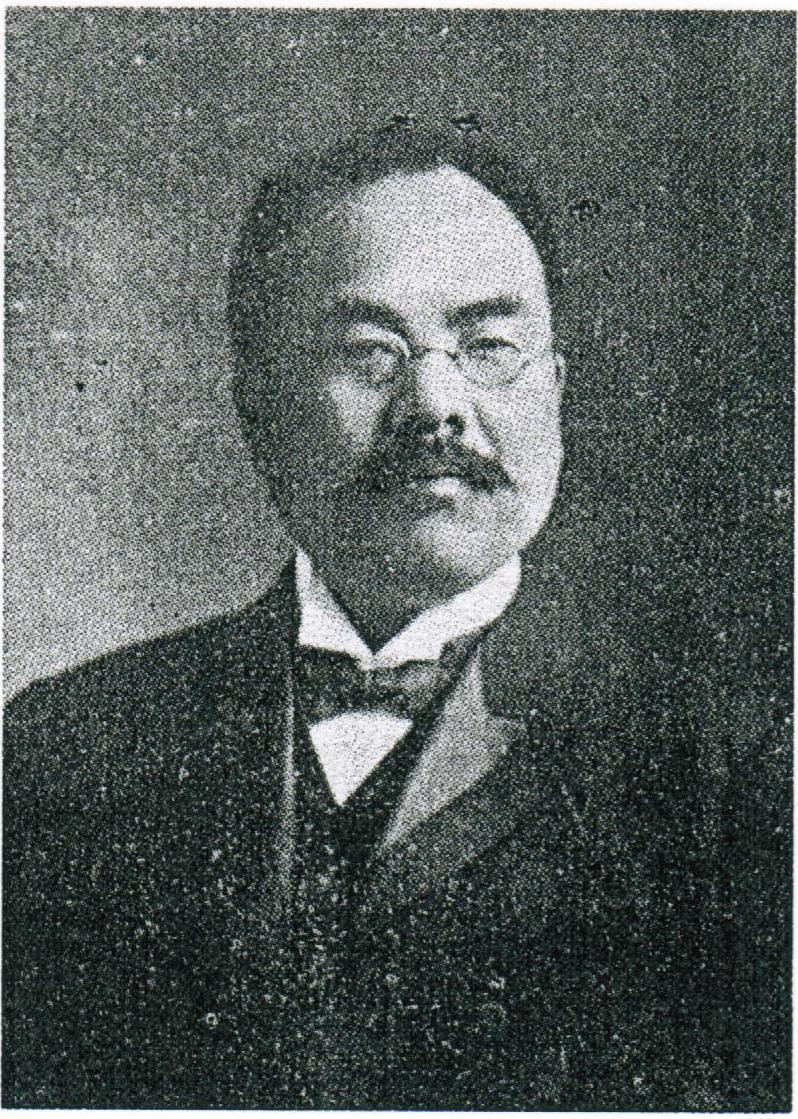
- Born: February 6, 1861; Edo, Japan
- Died: March 26, 1938 (aged 77)
- Occupations: educator and economist

Tameyuki Amano (天野 為之, Amano Tameyuki; February 6, 1861 – March 26, 1938) was a Japanese politician, educator and economist.

He was born in Edo (after renamed to Tokyo), and grown in Karatsu, Saga. He argued the classical economics and free trade policy, and introduced John Stuart Mill's theory into Japan, from Meiji to pre-war Showa era. He was elected in the first Japanese general election in 1890, from the Rikken Kaishintō, which pursued a British-style constitutional monarchy. He was also a president of Toyo Keizai Inc. and Waseda University.
