= Rashbehari Bose =

Indian independence leader (1886–1945)

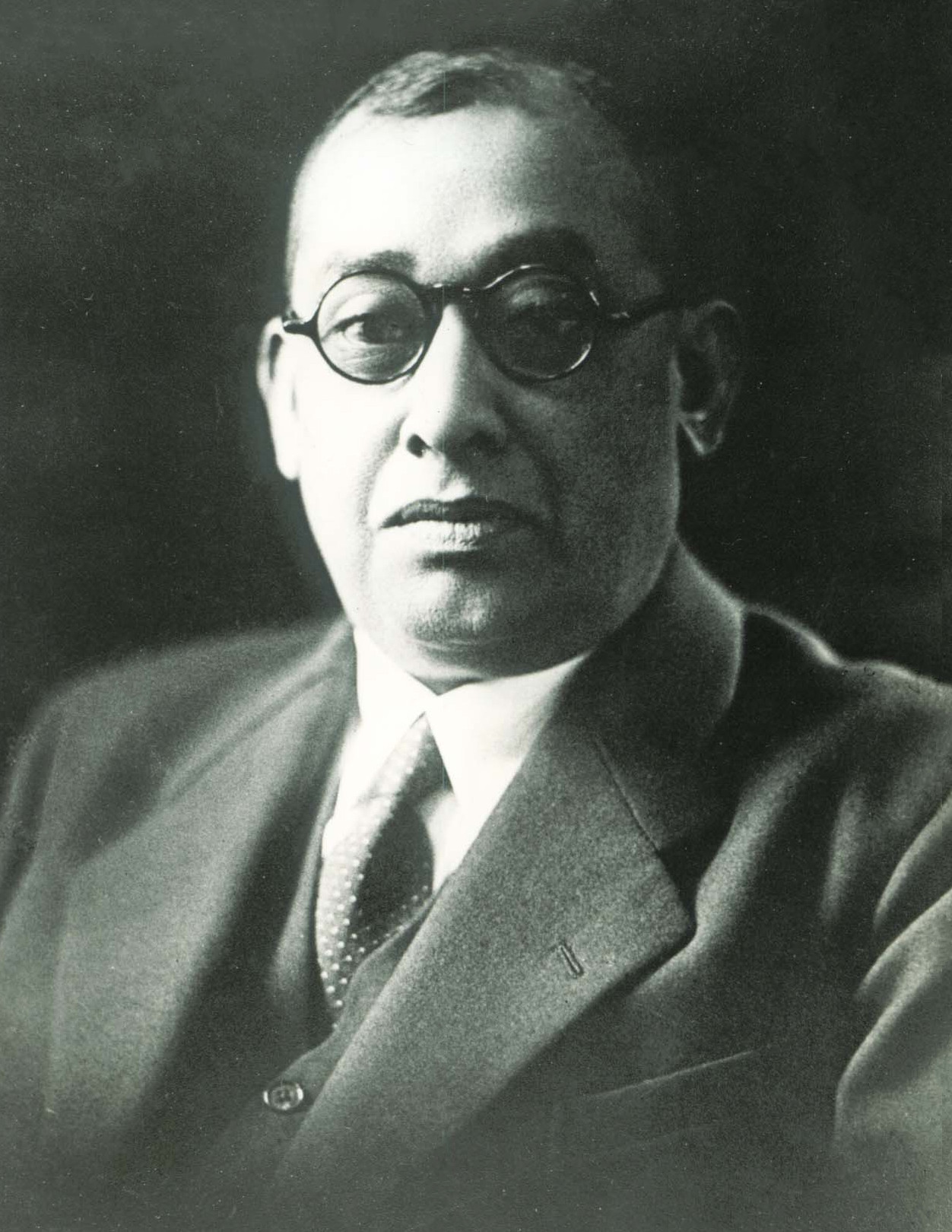
- Bose before 1945
- Born: 25 May 1886; Village-Subaldaha, Burdwan, Bengal Presidency, British India (present-day Village Subaldaha, Block-Raina 2, District-Purba Bardhaman West Bengal, India)
- Died: 21 January 1945 (aged 58); Tokyo, Japan
- Citizenship: British Indian (1886–1915); Stateless (1915–1923); Japan (1923–1945; his death)
- Organisations: Jugantar; Indian Independence League; Indian National Army
- Political party: Hindu Mahasabha
- Movement: Indian Independence movement, Ghadar Revolution, Indian National Army
- Spouse: Toshiko Bose (1916–1924; her death)
- Children: 2
- Relatives: Aizō Sōma (father-in-law); Kokkō Sōma (mother-in-law)

Rashbehari Bose (/rɑːʃ bihɑːri ˈboʊs/; 25 May 1886 – 21 January 1945) was an Indian revolutionary leader and freedom fighter who fought against the British Empire. He was one of the key organisers of the Ghadar Mutiny and founded the Indian Independence League. Bose helped organise the Indian National Army (INA), which was formed in 1942 under Mohan Singh.

He was behind the Delhi-Lahore Conspiracy to assassinate the Viceroy of India, Lord Hardinge, in 1912. After the failed assassination attempt, Bose moved to Imperial Japan. He sided with Azad Hind against Britain in World War II.

== Birth and ancestry ==
Rashbehari Bose was born in a Bengali Kayastha family in Subaldaha village of Purba Bardhaman district, now in West Bengal, India, on 25 May 1886. Bose grew up during the severe pandemics and famines of the British Raj. It fuelled his dislike for British rule. His father's name was Binod Behari Bose and mother was Bhubaneswari Devi. Tinkori Dasi was Rashbehari Bose's foster mother.

== Early life ==
Bose and his sister, Sushila, spent their childhood in Subaldaha. They lived with their father and also in the house of Bidhu Mukhi, the widowed sister-in-law of their grandfather, Kalicharan Bose. His early education was completed under the supervision of Kalicharan in the village 'pathsala' (traditional Hindu village school) which is presently Subaldaha Rashbehari Bose F.P School.

Bose was drawn towards the revolutionary movement on hearing stories from his grandfather and teacher (Bakkeswar) at Subaldaha. He was the cynosure of all villagers and was known for his stubborn attitude. His nickname was Rasu. It is heard from villagers that he was at Subaldaha till he was 12 or 14 years old.

His father, Binod Behari Bose, was stationed in Hooghly district for few years. During this time, Bose had to move to his maternal house in Chandernagar. There Bose studied at Dupleix College with his cousin and friend Shrish Chandra Ghosh. The principal, Charu Chandra Roy, inspired them into revolutionary politics. Later, he joined Morton School in Calcutta. He subsequently earned degrees in medical sciences and engineering.

== Revolutionary activities ==
Bose left Bengal to avoid the Alipore bomb case trials of 1908. At Dehradun, he worked as a head clerk at the Forest Research Institute. There, through Amarendra Chatterjee of the Jugantar, he secretly got involved with the revolutionaries of Bengal and he came across revolutionaries of the Arya Samaj in the United Provinces (currently Uttar Pradesh) and the Punjab.

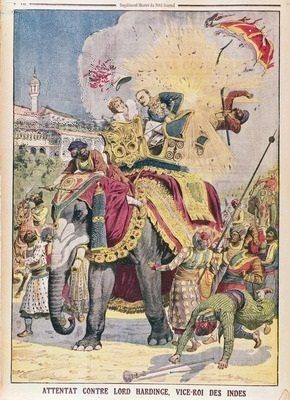
1912 assassination attempt on Lord Hardinge

In 1912, he, along with Basanta Kumar Biswas from Anushilan Samiti threw a self made bomb, in the convoy of Lord Hardinge, which led to the viceroy being severely injured. Although they failed in their attempt but this sent shockwaves throughout the British Raj. Following the Delhi-Lahore Conspiracy, which attempted the assassination of Lord Hardinge on 23 December 1912, Bose was forced to go into hiding. He was hunted by the colonial police due to his participation in the failed assassination attempt, Hardinge being at that time the Governor General and Viceroy. He returned to Dehradun by the night train and joined the office the next day as though nothing had happened. He organised a meeting of loyal citizens of Dehradun to condemn the dastardly attack on the Viceroy.

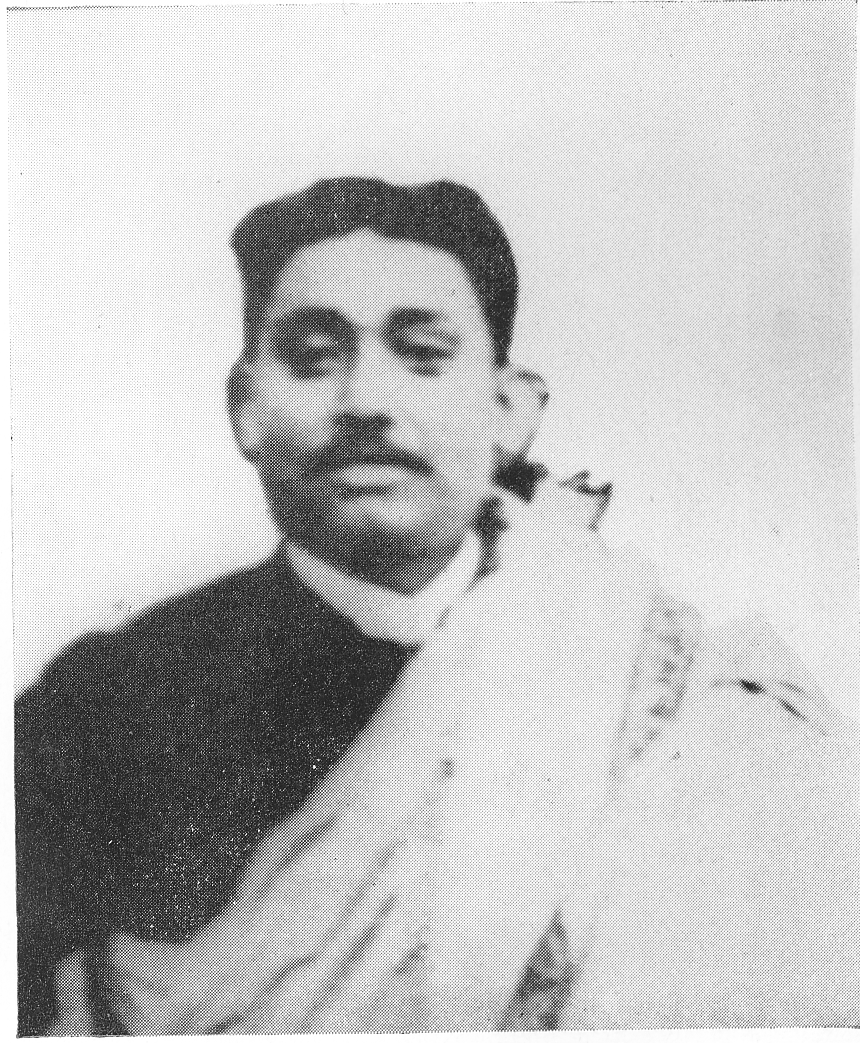
Rashbehari Bose in Dehradun

During the flood relief work in Bengal in 1913, Bose came in contact with Jatin Mukherjee in whom he "discovered a real leader of men," who "added a new impulse" to Bose's failing zeal. Thus, during World War (WW1) he became one of the leading figures of the Ghadar Mutiny, an attempt to trigger a mutiny in India in February 1915. Trusted and tried Ghadrites were sent to several cantonments to infiltrate into the army. The idea of the Gadar leaders was that with the war raging in Europe most of the soldiers had gone out of India and the rest could be easily won over. The revolution failed and most of the revolutionaries were arrested. But Bose managed to escape British intelligence and reached Japan in 1915.

== Indian National Army ==
Rashbehari Bose had reached Japan under the alias of Priyanath Thakur, a relative of Rabindranath Tagore, the noble prize winner Indian Bengali poet. There, Bose found shelter with various Pan-Asian groups. From 1915 to 1918, he changed residences and identities numerous times, as the British kept pressing the Japanese government for his extradition. He married the daughter of Aizō Sōma and Kokkō Sōma, the owners of Nakamuraya bakery in Tokyo and noted Pan-Asian supporters in 1918, and became a Japanese citizen in 1923, living as a journalist and writer. It is also significant that he was instrumental in introducing Indian-style curry in Japan. Though more expensive than the usual "British-style" curry, it became quite popular, with Rash Bihari becoming known as "Bose of Nakamuraya".

Bose, along with A. M. Nair, was instrumental in persuading the Japanese authorities to stand by the Indian revolutionaries, whom Japan ultimately to officially supported. He convened a conference in Tokyo on 28–30 March 1942, which decided to establish the Indian Independence League. There he also moved a motion to raise an army for Indian independence. He convened the second conference of the League at Bangkok on 22 June 1942, at which a resolution was adopted to invite Subhas Chandra Bose to join the League and take command as its president.

The Indian prisoners of war captured by the Japanese in the Malaya and Burma fronts were encouraged to join the Indian Independence League and become the soldiers of the Indian National Army (INA), formed on 1 September 1942 as the military wing of Rash Behari Bose's Indian National League. He selected the flag for the Azad Hind movement and handed over the flag and the power to Subhas Chandra Bose but his organizational structure remained which was built on the organizational spadework of Rash Behari Bose. Rash Behari Bose built the Indian National Army (also called 'Azad Hind Fauj'). Prior to his death caused by tuberculosis, the Japanese Government honoured him with the Order of the Rising Sun (2nd grade).

== Personal life ==
Bose met Toshiko Soma when he was hiding at her house in Shinjuku City. She was the daughter of Aizō Sōma and Kokkō Sōma, the owners of Nakamuraya bakery (ja:中村屋) in Tokyo and noted Pan-Asian supporters in 1918. At that time, Bose was a fugitive with the British searching for him. Their initial contact was during those intense moments of hiding though without any interactions. In 1916, when Bose was a fugitive no more, he invited the Soma family to his house as a gesture of gratitude. That was the first instance of their interaction in a social context.

However, Bose stuck out like a sore thumb in Japan. People would consider them with suspicion. Mitsuru Toyama, as a solution proposed to the Soma's a marriage between Toshiko and Rash Behari. He thought that marriage with a Japanese citizen would make it easy for Bose to apply for citizenship. Despite their initial reservations, the Somas agreed to the match. When asked, Toshiko took three weeks to give her consent.

They were married for eight years. Bose taught Toshiko Bengali and how to wear a sari. Bose got Japanese citizenship in 1923. Toshiko's health declined soon after and she died in 1924. After her death, he never remarried. They were buried together after Bose's death.

They had two children together. Masahide Bose (Bharatchandra) was born in 1920. He died in World War II aged 24. Their daughter, Tetsuko, was born in 1922.

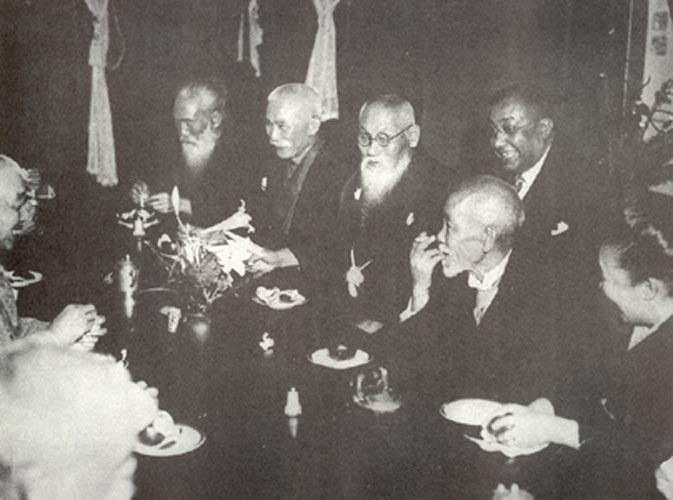
A dinner party given to Bose in his honour by his close Japanese friends, including Mitsuru Tōyama, a right-wing nationalist and Pan-Asianism leader (centre, behind the table), and Tsuyoshi Inukai, future Japanese prime minister (to the right of Tōyama). Behind Tōyama is Bose. 1915.

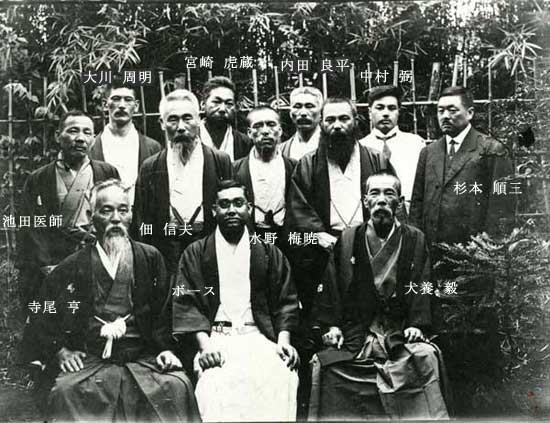
Bose and his Japanese supporters in 1916

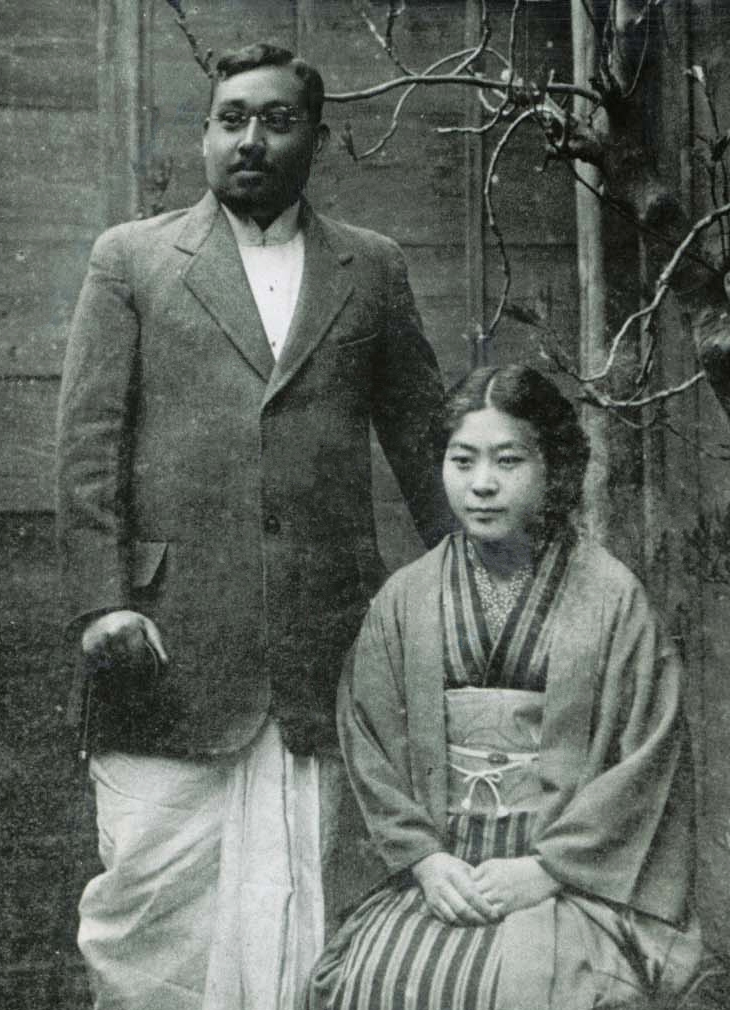
Bose with wife c. 1918

== Legacy ==
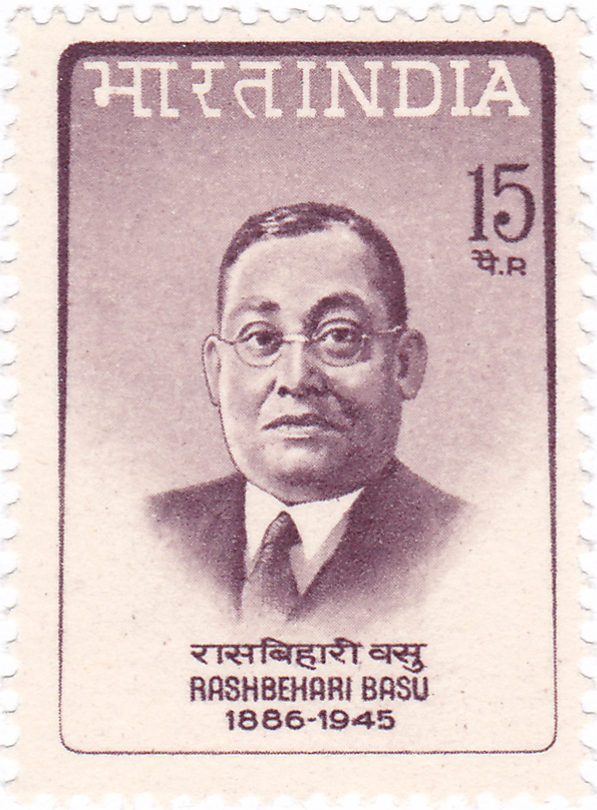
Rash Behari Bose on a 1967 stamp of India

In 1943, the Japanese government honoured Bose with the highest title available to a foreigner, the Order of the Rising Sun, 2nd class.

On 26 December 1967, the Posts and Telegraphs Department of India issued a special postage stamp in honour of Rashbehari Bose.

=== In popular culture ===
In the 2019 Indian Bengali-language television series titled Netaji which depicts the life of Netaji Subhash Chandra Bose, Fahim Mirza played the role of Rash Behari Bose.

Bhuvan Bam played Bose in The Revolutionaries (2026).

== See also ==
- Anushilan Samiti
- Hindu–German Conspiracy
- Subhas Chandra Bose
