= Obukhovka, Belgorod Oblast =

Obukhovka Обуховка
- Interactive map of Obukhovka
- Coordinates: 51°10′N 37°58′E
- Country: Russia
- Federal subject: Belgorod Oblast
- Elevation: 151 m (495 ft)

Population
  - Estimate (2010): 1,159 )
- Time zone: UTC+3 (MSK)
- Postal code: 309545
- OKTMO ID: 14740000326

Obukhovka (Russian: Обуховка) is a rural locality (a selo) in Starooskolsky District, Belgorod Oblast, Russia. The population was 1,159 as of 2010. There are 25 streets.

== Geography ==
Obukhovka is located 22 km southeast of Stary Oskol (the district's administrative centre) by road. Babaninka is the nearest rural locality.
