= Rokuzan Ogiwara =

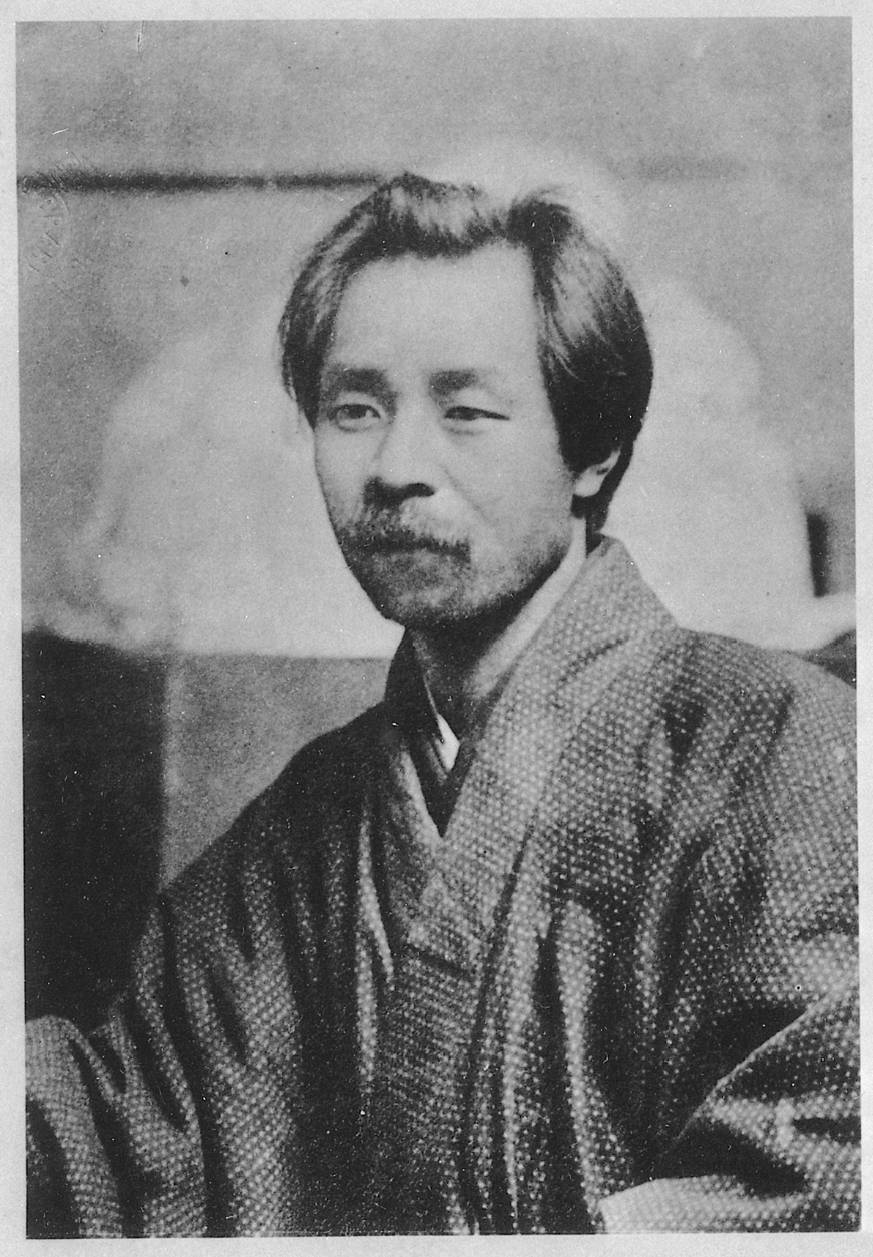

Rokuzan Ogiwara (荻原 碌山, Ogiwara Rokuzan; 1 December 1879 – 22 April 1910) was a sculptor active in Meiji period Japan. His real name was Morie Ogiwara (荻原 守衛, Ogiwara Morie). He is regarded as one of the pioneers of modern western-style bronze sculpture in Japan.

== Early life ==
Ogiwara was born in Azumino in Nagano Prefecture in the mountains of central Japan, as the fifth son of a local farmer. He was forced to drop out of school at an early age due to a heart condition. In 1894, he met Aizō Sōma and his wife Kokkō Sōma, the wealthy proprietors of the Nakamura-ya bakery in Tokyo and noted art patrons, and partly due to their influence, he became an active member of the temperance movement and a convert to Christianity.

== Artistic career ==
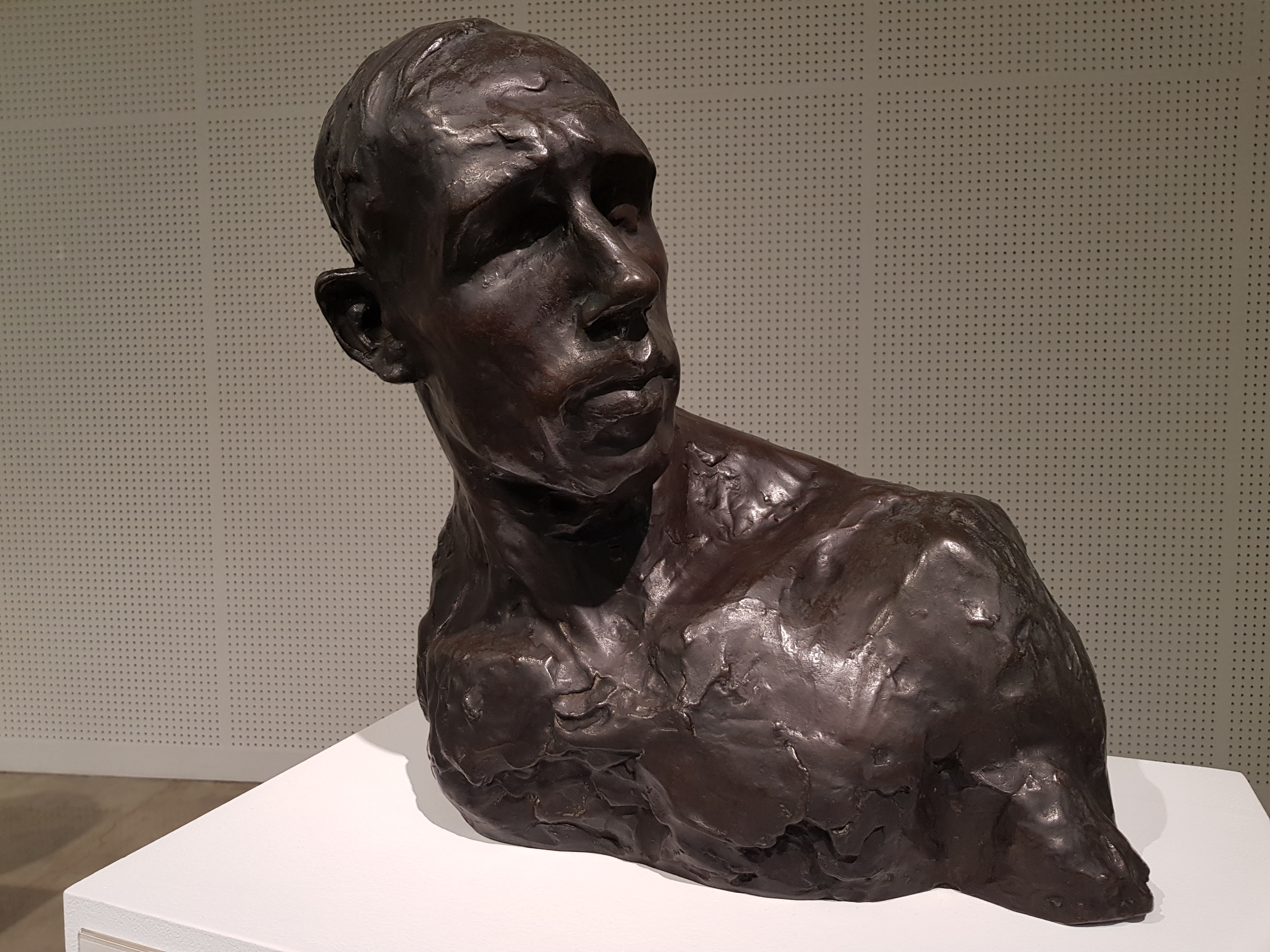
"The Miner," 1909.

The Sōmas recognized Ogiwara's artistic talent, and agreed to become his sponsors. He relocated to Tokyo in 1899, and also stayed at the Sōmas' summer villa in Kamakura, Kanagawa. Ogiwara traveled to New York City in the United States in 1901 to study oil painting under contemporary artists Robert Henri and William Merritt Chase at the New York School of Art and at the Art Students League. In 1903, he traveled to Paris, France, where he met with his patron, Sōma Aizo, who set him up in a garret apartment, and arranged for him to take further courses at the famed Académie Julian in painting. However, when Ogiwara viewing Auguste Rodin's just-completed The Thinker, he had a complete change of mind, and decided to devote his talents exclusively to bronze sculpture instead. He returned to the United States in 1904 to learn sculpting techniques from scratch, and returned again to the Académie Julian in France in 1906.

In France, he was able to meet Rodin in person and received instruction from him. He also met the famous Japanese sculptor Kōtarō Takamura in Paris, and acted as his tour guide for the major art museums in Paris. He visited the British Museum in London, admiring Egyptian sculptures there. Around this time Ogiwara also completed his first works of sculpture. In late 1907, he departed France for Japan, by way of Italy, Greece and Egypt, finally returning home to Japan in 1908.

After his reunion with the Sōmas, he set up his atelier in Shinjuku, Tokyo, near their Nakamura-ya bakery. In 1908, he entered a work entitled Mongaku into the Second Annual National Exhibition. This work, a life-sized bust of a revered Buddhist priest of 12th-century Japan, won third place. He followed this with two works (The Worker and Hojo Torakichi) in the Third Annual National Exhibition in 1909. In 1910, he completed a work entitled Woman, which he intended to enter into the Fourth Annual National Exhibition in 1910, but he died suddenly from tuberculosis after it was completed. The work was entered posthumously, and was so well received by art critics that it was also chosen as a representative work at the Japan-British Exhibition (1910) in London, as the first example of modern Japanese sculpture.

== Legacy ==
Although his career was short and he left only a few works, Ogiwara strongly influenced the development of modern sculpture in Japan. The stone originals of his works Woman and Hojo Torakichi are listed by the Japanese government as Important Cultural Properties of Japan. They are now displayed at the Tokyo National Museum, while the bronze original of Woman is at the Tokyo National Museum of Modern Art.

The Rokuzan Art Museum in Hotaka, Azumino, Nagano, displays his works as well as art by others. The museum building, constructed in 1958 as a memorial to him using funds collected by Nagano schoolchildren over four decades, is designed to resemble a Christian church and was built using brick and stained glass.

His work was honored by a commemorative postage stamp issued by the Japanese government. Ogiwara's life story was also made into a TV movie, Rokuzan no ai ("Rokuzan's Love") aired by Tokyo Broadcasting System (TBS) in February 2007. Rokuzan is played by Japanese actor Hiroyuki Hirayama, and the story line depicts a forbidden romance between Rokuzan and Kokkō Sōma (played by Miki Mizuno), with Kokkō Sōma providing the model for Woman.
