= Gumnaami =

2019 film directed by Srijit Mukherji

- Teaser poster
- Directed by: Srijit Mukherji
- Screenplay by: Srijit Mukherji
- Story by: Srijit Mukherji
- Based on: Conundrum by Anuj Dhar and Chandrachur Ghose
- Produced by: Mahendra Soni; Shrikant Mohta
- Starring: Prosenjit Chatterjee; Anirban Bhattacharya; Tanusree Chakraborty
- Cinematography: Soumik Haldar; Manish Patra
- Edited by: Pronoy Dasgupta; Manish Patra
- Music by: Indraadip Dasgupta
- Production company: Shree Venkatesh Films
- Release date: 2 October 2019 (Bengali)
- Running time: 142 minutes
- Country: India
- Languages: Bengali; Hindi

Gumnaami is a 2019 Indian Bengali-language mystery film based on the true events directed by Srijit Mukherji, which deals with the mystery of Netaji's death, based on the Mukherjee Commission hearings and the book Conundrum written by Anuj Dhar and Chandrachur Ghose. It has been produced by Shrikant Mohta, Pranay Ranjan, and Mahendra Soni under the banner of Shree Venkatesh Films. Prosenjit Chatterjee plays the roles of Subhas Chandra Bose and Gumnaami Baba.

The principal photography began in May 2019 in Asansol, West Bengal. The film was released theatrically on 2 October 2019.

== Plot ==
The film is based on the Mukherjee Commission hearings and shows a dramatized version of the works of Anuj Dhar, Chandrachur Ghose and the Mission Netaji voluntary organisation. The film shows the three theories trying to explain the death or disappearance of Subhas Chandra Bose.

The film starts with Subhas Chandra Bose at the Congress Conference. A courageous Subhas disagrees to follow the nonviolent methods of Gandhi and resigns from Indian National Congress. He then travels the world to make allies while confronting the British Army. In 2003, journalist Chandrachur Dhar (Anirban Bhattacharya) is given an assignment for writing a detailed report about the mystery surrounding Subhas Chandra Bose's death. He takes up the assignment and spends months to gather evidence and knowledge about Bose. His neglectful attitude towards his wife (Tanusree Chakraborty) compels her to divorce him. Mentally frustrated, Dhar quits his job and forms a group entirely dedicated to the purpose for solving the mystery.

At the 2005 Mukherjee Commission hearing, he addresses the jury boldly. According to him, there was no plane crash at all in 1945. Bose had preplanned to fake his death to the world and asked his most trustworthy soldier of the Indian National Army (INA) Habib ur Rahman (who later left the partitioned India and joined to higher posts in the Government of Pakistan, including the Additional Defense Secretary) to be with him and not to disclose his fake death to anyone. To support his statement, Dhar shows numerous evidences like why he went to a six-seater fighter plane when there were twelve-seater planes available, there were no recorded plane crash that year, and that there was no news of death of the Japanese soldiers who were supposed to have died in the plane crash.

The judge, seemingly convinced, asks that if the plane crash did not happen then where did Subhas go. Dhar reveals that Subhas lived as an ascetic in Uttar Pradesh without revealing his identity or face; the people who visited him could only see him behind a curtain. A few people recognised him as soon as they heard his voice. However, they never revealed it to any third person. Even his close colleague and revolutionary, Leela Roy and Samar Guha, recognised him when they visited him and later maintained correspondence. It is revealed that the family members knew he was alive. Numerous pieces of evidence were lying with them. He became known as 'Gumnaami Baba' and died in 1985. Only 13 disciples were present at the funeral.

The next day, the commission concludes that there was no plane crash and that Bose did not die in 1945. However, in 2006, the Government refused to accept the verdict and discarded the report. Angry and frustrated, Dhar burns all his work and contemplates the purpose of his hard work of 3 years. His former wife encourages him to fight as Bose did for the country for 30 years. They vow to keep on fighting till justice is served.

In a flashback, Subhas Chandra Bose is seen singing Shubh Sukh Chain, the national anthem of the Provisional Government of Free India, along with the Indian National Army.

== Cast ==
- Anirban Bhattacharya as Chandrachur Dhar, based on Anuj Dhar and Chandrachur Ghose, the two researcher on Netaji and his life events
- Prosenjit Chatterjee as Netaji Subhas Chandra Bose and Gumnami Baba
- Tanusree Chakraborty as Ronita Dhar
- Biplab Dasgupta as Mr. Paul
- Shyamal Chakraborty
- Surendra Rajan as Mahatma Gandhi
- Sanjay Gurbaxani as Jawaharlal Nehru
- Anindya Sain as Anuj
- Akshay Kapoor as Srikant Sharma Kanha
- Satyam Bhattacharya as Habibur Rehman, INA Soldier
- Shibashish Bandopadhyay
- Prantik Banerjee as Suresh Gupta
- Pallavi Chatterjee in Lolita Bose (cameo)
- Srijit Mukherjee as Chandrachur's office boss
- Indroneel Banerjee as Dr. P. Banerjee
- David Yue as a Japanese doctor

== Reception ==
Debolina Sen of Times News Network rated the film 3 out of 5, writing, "The film starts with depicting a conversation between the three iconic leaders of India — Mahatma Gandhi, Jawaharlal Nehru and Netaji Subhas Chandra Bose. Though the scene is a dramatised version of what could have transpired between them during that meet, the scene draws closely from the popular image painted of the three and their strong ideologies. This near-perfect scene is carefully designed to give an old black and white reel feel that incorporates the uneven screen texture well. Sadly, no other scene in the film later is as detailed as this.". Bhaskar Chattopadhyay of Firstpost gave the film 2.5 out of 5, writing, "The second half has life in it, it is vibrant. It chooses a track and decides to tell a beautiful tale — whose veracity is neither moot nor of anyone’s business. I only wish that Mukherji would have done this in the first half too. Because he could."

== Soundtrack ==
The soundtrack of the film is composed by I.N.A. and D. L. Roy, whereas background music and score is done by Indraadip Dasgupta. The lyrics are by D. L. Roy and Capt. Abid Ali Mumtaz Hussain.

Soundtrack
No.	Title	Singer	Length
1.	"Subhasji"	Sonu Nigam	5:09
2.	"Shubh Sukh Chain"	Babul Supriyo	4:51
3.	"Kadam Kadam"	Ishan Mitra	4:25
4.	"Dhawno Dhanyo"	Mekhla Dasgupta, Ikkshita Mukherjee	9:03
Total length:			23:30

== Awards ==
67th National Film Awards

- Best Feature Film in Bengali - Gumnaami
- Best Adapted Screenplay - Srijit Mukherji

== Controversy ==
The director of the film Srijit Mukherji courted a controversy in February 2019, after Netaji Subhas Chandra Bose's grand nephew Chandra Kumar Bose criticized him over portrayal of Gumnami Baba as Netaji in his upcoming film.

== See also ==
- List of artistic depictions of Mahatma Gandhi
