= Anuj Dhar =

Indian conspiracy theorist

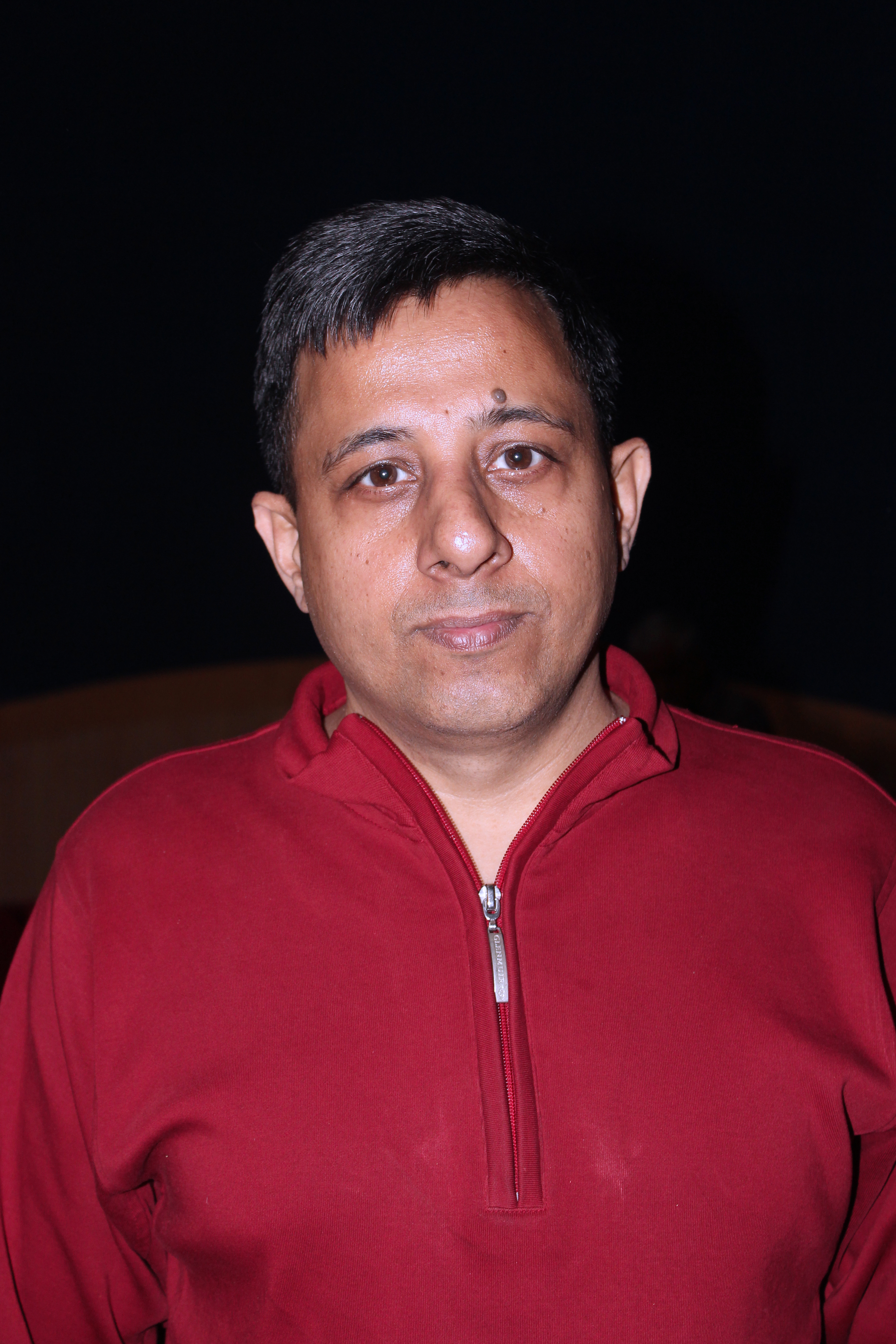
- Anuj Dhar in a national seminar at Bhopal January 2018
- Occupations: Author; Journalist

Anuj Dhar is an Indian conspiracy theorist, author and former journalist. He has published several books around the locus of death of Subhas Chandra Bose that propound theories about his living for several years after the purported plane crash, thus contradicting the current consensus. Dhar is also the founder-trustee of a not for profit organisation, Mission Netaji, which campaigns for the declassification of documents concerning Bose.

== Claims ==
Dhar has claimed that Bose had lived in the Uttar Pradesh state of India as Gumnami Baba or Bhagwanji a hermit till 1985. The claims were debunked by the Mukherjee Commission which rejected any linkage between the two, in light of a DNA profiling test. The Commission rejected the plane crash theory and stated that Netaji ‘did not die in the plane crash as alleged’ and that ‘the ashes in the Japanese temple are not of Netaji’. However Indian Government did not accept the findings of the commission.

He also believes that Bose escaped to Russia (then, Soviet Union) after the crash and has accused successive Congress governments of being a part of broader conspiracy to keep Netaji dead. The Mukherjee commission did not locate any relevant material in the KGB archives.

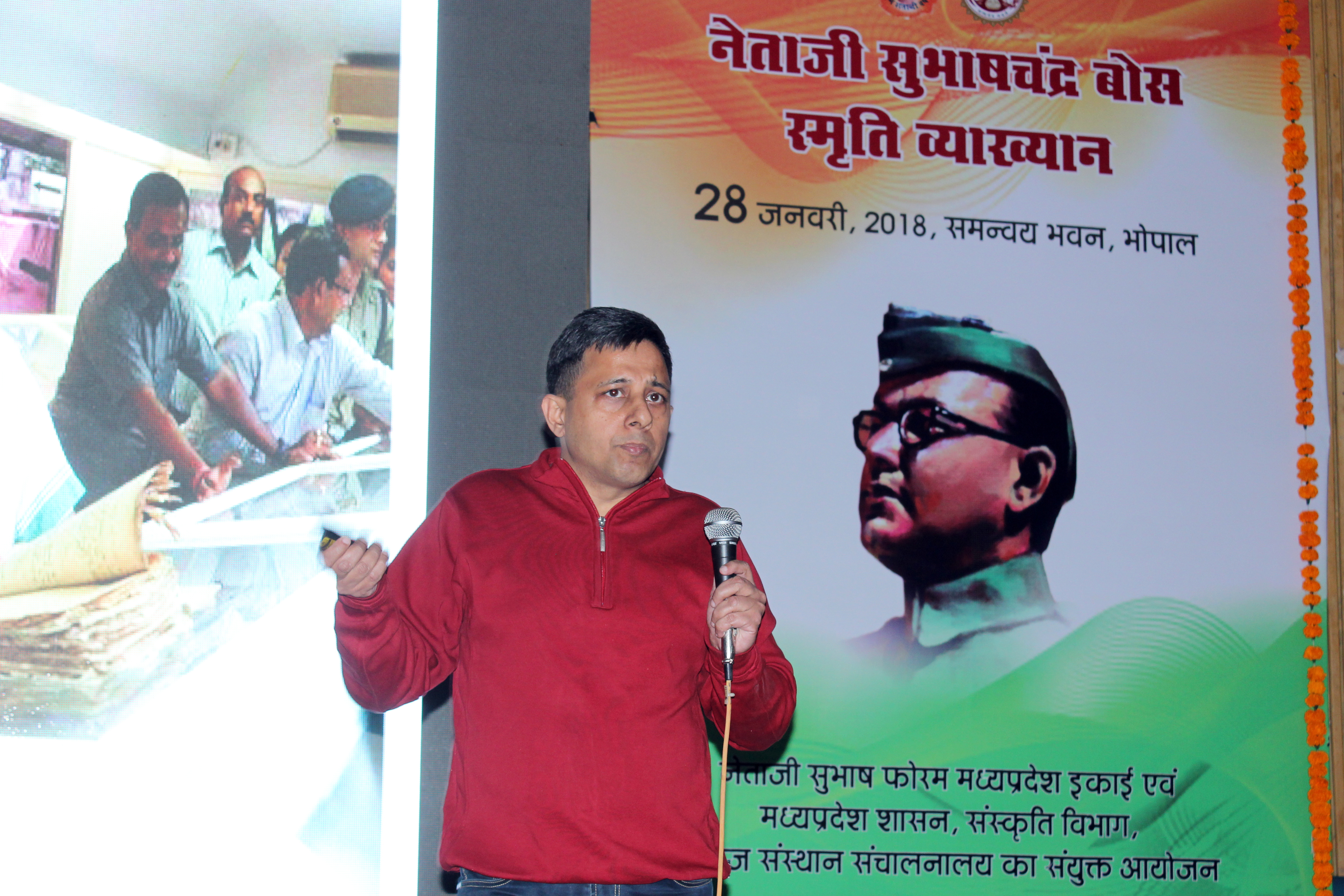
Anuj Dhar January 2018

In 2005, the Taiwan government provided emails to Dhar that it has no records of a plane crash during the period of 14 August to 25 October 1945, at the old Matsuyama Airport (now Taipei Domestic Airport). These records played a major role in the final assertion of Mukherjee Commission about the implausibility of Bose dying from an air crash. Historian Sugata Bose has rejected the analysis in light of the fact that the region and the airport was under Japanese occupation until 1946 and it was around 1949 when the Taiwaniese government finally consolidated itself.

In the book No Secrets, Dhar states that, according to a newspaper article published by Bose's elder brother Sarat Chandra Bose in The Nation, Bose was in China in October 1949.

Dhar's 2008 book, CIA's Eye on South Asia, compiled declassified Central Intelligence Agency records on India and its neighbours.

== Criticism ==
Netaji biographer Leaonard A. Gordon also penned a critical note on Dhar in a postscript of his book Brothers Against the Raj. There Gordon alleged that Dhar misuses the Subhas Chandra Bose death mystery issue for contemporary Indian political purposes.

On August 18, 2019, Dhar shared a digitally altered photograph of Subhas Chandra Bose reading a newspaper with a headline announcing his own death. He captioned the image:"Original picture with some reimagination by @BiplabC2. #Netaji #DeathThatWasnt #TheBoseMystery #Gumnaami @prosenjitbumba @srijitspeaketh @chandrachurg @PanickarS @koushikzworld @SayakSen6 @Sayani_Pandit." The photo was shared on Twitter (Now X since June 23, 2023). Notably, Dhar had previously shared the original image on May 27, 2018 with the caption, "Subhas Chandra Bose reading Nippon Times (now The Japan Times), Japan's largest and oldest English-language daily newspaper @japantimes"

== Bibliography ==
| Year | Book | Publisher | ISBN | Reference |
|---|---|---|---|---|
| 2005 | Back from Dead: Inside the Subhas Bose Mystery | Manas Publications | ISBN 8170492378 | |
| 2008 | CIA's Eye on South Asia | Manas Publications | ISBN 978-8170493464 | |
| 2012 | India's Biggest Cover-up | Vitasta Publishing | ISBN 978-9380828695 | |
| 2013 | No Secrets | Vitasta Publishing | ISBN 978-9382711056 | |
| 2015 | What Happened to Netaji | Vitasta Publishing | ISBN 978-9382711889 | |
| 2019 | Your Prime Minister is dead | Vitasta Publishing | ISBN 978-9386473356 | |
| 2019 | Conundrum (along with co-author Chandrachur Ghose) | Vitasta Publishing | ISBN 978-9386473578 | |
| 2021 | Government Doesn't Want You To Know This (with co-author Chandrachur Ghose) | Vitasta Publishing | ISBN 8194964059 | |
| 2024 | The Bose Deception: Declassified | Vintage Books | ISBN 978-0670097272 | |

== See also ==
- Bose: Dead/Alive, 2017 miniseries based on Anuj Dhar's book India's Biggest Cover-up
- Gumnaami, 2019 Indian Bengali-language film based on Anuj Dhar's book Conundrum
