= Bhagwanji =

Ascetic frequently claimed to be Subhas Chandra Bose

Bhagwanji, also known as Gumnami Baba (lit. 'Baba with no name'), was an ascetic who lived approximately the last thirty years of his life in various parts of Uttar Pradesh, India. He is best known for being the object of rumors that asserted his real identity as being Subhas Chandra Bose. These claims have repeatedly been found to be unsubstantiated by numerous investigations. Bose presumed to have died in a plane crash on 18 August 1945, but legends and rumors of his purported survival have circulated ever since.

Bhagwanji died on 16 September 1985, in Ayodhya.

== Items recovered from Bhagwanji's belongings ==
Several items were recovered from Bhagwanji's belongings which were sent to district treasury in 26 wooden boxes. Details of those items were reported in many newspapers. Items contained huge collection of books in English, Hindi and Bengali, numerous Indian and foreign magazines and newspapers, many foreign made items, letters from some very important political and national leaders, maps, photographs of Bose's family members and some Indian National Army memorabilia.

- Many letters were found, written to Bhagwanji from former Indian National Army officers and mainly Pabitra Mohan Roy. Some letters were written by Bose family members. A letter from M. S. Golwalkar, director of RSS was found where he had addressed Bhagwanji as Pujyapad Shrimaan Swami Vijayanandji Maharaj. The letter read – "I received your letter written from August 25 to September 2 on September 6, 1972. If you point out one particular location out of the three places mentioned in the letter, then my job will certainly become easier." Another letter was from famous revolutionist Trailokyanath Chakravarty who in a letter written in 1963 to Bhagwanji, reminisced many accounts of spending time with Netaji in Mandalay jail and concluded that he along with thousands of ill-treated and oppressed people of East Pakistan, are still waiting for him to return.
- A large collection of books in Bengali, English, Hindi and Sanskrit, were recovered. Complete work of Rabindranath Tagore, Saratchandra Chatterjee, William Shakespeare, Atharv Ved Samhita in Bengali by Durgadas Lahiri, Vivekananda Bani (Bengali) by Kumar Krishna Nandi, ' Sadhak Ramprasad' by Swami Vivekananda, Bulletin of Netaji Research Bureau of January 1966, Freedom and after by Rabindranath Khan, Hindi copy of 30 years in Jail by TrailokyaNath Chakrovarty, selected work of P G Wodehouse, Charles Dickens, Lewis Carroll, Victor Hugo, Henry Miller, Swami Abhedananda, Rubaiyat of Omar Khayyam were few to mention. Many books pertaining to modern history and politics viz. The Last Days of the British Raj by Leonard Mosley, History of the Freedom Movement in India 3 volumes by RC Majumdar, The Lessons of History by Will Durant and Ariel Durant, India Wins Freedom by Maulana Abul Kalam Azad, Netaji Through German Lens by Nanda Mookerjee, Himalayan Blunder by Brigadier John Dalvi, India's China war by Neville Maxwell, Moscow's Shadow over West Bengal by Rajni Mukherjee, The Gulag Archipelago by Aleksandr Solzhenitsyn, copy of International Military Tribunal for the Far East, few books of journalist Kuldip Nayar, a copy of Hanuman Chalisa and Bhagwad Gita.
- Among artefacts found, there were framed photographs of parents of Netaji, his school teacher Benimadhab Das, elder brother Suresh Chandra Bose (draped in a typical Bengali silk), group photo of Netaji's family, single photo of Netaji's parents, Netaji's photo in INA uniform, photographs of several INA colleagues, INA uniform, medals and insignia, an English made typewriter, German made binocular, needles, European crockery set, a Rolex golden watch and 2 golden round Omega watches (similar to what Netaji's father had gifted him), smoking pipes and 3 US made Sheaffer pens.
- Several maps along with two hand-drawn maps of Bangladesh and of a route originating in Eastern Russia, moving through Mongolia, China, Tibet and Nepal were also found along with several newspapers and magazines of which some were internationally published.

== Correspondence and meeting with famous people ==
Among people who had met Bhagwanji were some of the notable names of politics in independent India.

- Atul Sen, a professor and an ex-MLA from Dacca (now Dhaka), Bangladesh. He knew Netaji beforehand as it was on Netaji's insistence he ran for office and won the election in the 1930s. He had a chance meeting with Bhagwanji sometime in the early 1960s at Neemsar. Upon being convinced he wrote a letter to prime minister Nehru, stating "I take the liberty of addressing these few lines to you in the matter of the widely prevalent belief that Netaji Subhas Chandra Bose is not dead. Mine is not mere belief but actual knowledge that Netaji is alive and is engaged in spiritual practice somewhere in India. Not the sadhu of Shoulmari, Cooch Behar, in West Bengal about whom some Calcutta politicians are making a fuss. I deliberately make the location a little vague because from the talks I had with him for months together not very long ago, I could understand that he is yet regarded as Enemy No. 1 of the Allied Powers, and that there is a secret protocol that binds the government of India to deliver him to Allied 'justice' if found alive. ". To that Nehru replied stating the India is not bound to any such clause in any agreement. Because of Sen's overzealousness, Bhagwanji asked him not to meet him again. Sen however informed Pabitra Mohan Roy in Kolkata about Bhagwanji.
- Dr. Pabitra Mohan Roy, a physician by profession who was also an intelligence officer in Indian National Army, carried this information to Leela Roy. Mr Roy met Bhagwanji in March 1962 at Neemsar and maintained contact with him till Sept, 1985. Numerous letters written by Mr. Roy were recovered from Bhagwanji's belongings and likewise many letters from Bhagwanji were recovered at Roy's place at Dum Dum, Kolkata. On his subsequent visits to Bhagwanji during the aforementioned period, he started taking written notes, delivered by Bhagwanji himself, and transcribed it in form of secret diaries, that were unpublished till 2019, which was later on published as a book named "Mahakal Kathan".
- Leela Roy, someone who knew Netaji for almost two decades, was the most renowned of all who had met Bhagwanji. She along with Mr. Roy met Bhagwanji in 1963. Leela Roy met Bhagwanji, accompanied by Kaviraj Kamalakanta Ghosh, Shaila Sen(called by Bhagwanji as Shailukumari), Prof Samar Guha, & Anil Das (Renu) of INA Secret Service. Leela Roy with her team stayed there for 10/12 days. Bhagwanji presented a Tea cup with plate wrapped in saffron cloth, later he presented his self used Scheaffer Pen to Lee as a token of remembrance. It is said that Bhagwanji addressed Leela Roy as 'Lee', as Netaji used to do in the days of their working together.
  - Leela Roy in a letter to Dilipkumar Roy, a close friend of Netaji, mentioned that your friend is still alive and is living as a mystic in India and she isn't entitled to say anything more of it.
  - She started providing for Bhagwanji and used to send items as requested by Bhagwanji till her death in 1970.
- Samar Guha, an ardent Netaji follower, revolutionist, elected three consecutive times as a Member of Parliament, professor at Jadavpur University and writer of famous books on chemistry, visited Bhagwanji along with Leela Roy. Several of his letters were found at Bhagwanji's place. He kept in touch with Bhagwanji till 1985 and visited almost every year.
- Sunil Krishna Gupta, brother of famous revolutionist Dinesh Chandra Gupta, first visited Bhagwanji in 1963, after requested by Suresh Chandra Bose, Netaji's elder brother. Later his nephews Surajit Dasgupta and Jagatjit Dasgupta also used to accompany him, along with Tarun Kumar Mukhopadhyay. They deposed in front of Mukherjee commission and testified that Bhagwanji was Netaji only.
- Apart from these, Sunil Das, Santosh Bhattacharya, Dulal Nandy and Bijoy Nag used to visit Bhagwanji, who were associated with Jayashree publications, started by Leela Roy. Bijoy Nag later testified in front of Mukherjee Commission, that Bhagwanji was Netaji.
- Unconfirmed reports of visits from famous people viz. Dr. Sampurnanand, Anandamayi Ma, Pranab Mukherjee and Charan Singh also exist. Letters from Dr Sampurnanand and Ghani Khan Choudhury has been recovered from Bhagwanji's belongings.

== Search for his true identity ==
The life story of Bhagwanji was first published by a group of journalists; Ashok Tandon, Ram Tirth Vikal and Chandresh Kumar Srivastav, in a daily called Naye Log in Faizabad few weeks after Bhagwanji's death. Mr. Tandon went on to write a book called Gumnami Subhash in 1986. At the same time another magazine "Northern India Patrika" started publishing a series on Bhagwanji or Gumnami baba relating him with Netaji.

As there were no claimants on Gumnami baba's belongings, district administration decided to auction the items. The attempt was stopped by local people and to quote Ashok Tandon -

"After the reports emerged that the state administration is likely to auction the belongings of Gumnami Baba, Kauser Hussain of Northern India Patrika along with Vishwa Bandhav Tiwari and Mohd Haleem approached the court to stop the auctioning. The court ordered the administration to make the inventory of all the things that were found at Baba's place and submit it to the treasury. One of the letters found at Gumnami Baba's place was written by Basanti Devi, wife of Deshbandhu Chittaranjan Das, who considered Netaji Subhas Chandra Bose as her own son."

In early 1986, Lalita Bose a niece of Subhash Chandra Bose, arrived at Faizabad and upon going through the items, came to the conclusion that those belonged to her great-uncle only. She identified her mother's handwriting on a copy of the dissentient report submitted by Suresh Chandra as part of Shah Nawaz Committee, where she had addressed her brother in law as "Param kalyaneeya devar chiranjiveshu – Pranadhik sneh ashirvad".

She filed a writ petition (no. 929(M/B)) in Allahabad High Court, along with M Haleem and V Tiwari, demanding an immediate stop to auctioning the items, preparing an inventory of items and after due enquiry if it's ascertained that Gumnami baba was Netaji, hand over the items to her as she has right to inherit.

As per interim order passed by the court, an inventory was prepared of all the items recovered from Ram Bhawan. 25 wooden trunks full of clothes, literature, letters and other artefacts were recovered. The state government had filed a counter affidavit to the petition, where they did mention that all the items recovered surprisingly relate to Netaji. They also observed that on every 23 January, the birthday of Netaji Subhash Chandra Bose, a closed door ceremony used to take place in Bhagwanji's room where people from Calcutta used to be present.

=== Hanoi note ===
In a note found among the articles, written in Bengali by Bhagwanji, it said

2.9.45—Japs surrendered/Annamite Govt. became 'Govt. of Vietnam' under Ho Chi Minh/Hanoi/Liu Po Cheng

Oct 1945: South China, General's Guest/Contact with Annamite Govt./One American Intelligence agent—Alfred Wagg—found out, told his Govt."

Liu Bocheng/Liu Po Cheng was a famous Chinese military general fighting for People's republic. A writer named Shiv Prasad Nag wrote a book in 1950s called Liu Po Cheng or Netaji? A copy of the book was found among Bhagwanji's belongings along with a letter from Nag. A letter from Bhagwanji to Nag was also found where he wrote few lines in Bengali;

যাকে তুমি বহুদিন আগে জেনেছিলে তাকে ভুলে যাও, সে মরে ভূত হয়ে গেছে। তাই সেই লোকটার মাপকাঠিতে এই শরীরকে বোঝার চেষ্টা করলে ভুল করবে। সেই আগের তিনি আর নেই, বাইরের থেকে এবং ভেতরে সে এক মৃত ভূত, ভাবলেশহীন, স্থবির এবং সবার ধরা ছোয়ার বাইরে. (Do forget the one, you once knew, for he has turned into a ghost. Comparing this physical being with that person will only be misleading. That man is long gone. Physically and emotionally he has turned into a dead ghost, void of emotions, unwavering in conduct and beyond everyone's reac

As to Alfred Wagg, he was a wartime correspondent for Chicago Tribune, who on 29 August 1945, openly challenged Jawaharlal Nehru during a press conference, regarding why Netaji shouldn't be treated as a war criminal and also claimed that Netaji is alive and was seen four days back in Saigon.

=== DNA Analysis of teeth ===
Anuj Dhar an investigative journalist, found a match box containing 9 teeth among Bhagwanji's belongings. Assuming those belonged to Bhagwanji, he requested Justice Manoj Kumar Mukherjee for a DNA analysis to be conducted on the teeth.

In 2004, two separate samples were sent to Central Forensic Science Laboratory, Hyderabad and Central Forensic Science Laboratory, Kolkata along with blood samples from Netaji's relatives from paternal and maternal side.

The report from Hyderabad was inconclusive and the reason mentioned, the teeth "did not yield DNA suitable for complete analysis".

The report from CFSL Kolkata was conclusive and reported that the DNA samples of the teeth didn't match with the DNA from Netaji's family members.

Noted DNA expert Professor Gyaneshwar Chobey of Banaras Hindu University, who has studied CFSL's report, said he was disappointed to see the analysis. He said, "There are many problems with the analysis as the software used to analyse samples (bioedit) is not meant for electropherogram analysis. Only four of 20 markers could not be used to infer anything about parental lineage." He further observed, "Height cannot be measured by dental morphology. Moreover 40-100 mg of pulp from a tooth is practically impossible.""

While replying to an RTI filed by Sayak Sen, the CFSL director said on 4 February 2020, that Electropherogram report, related to the test is not available with CFSL, Kolkata.

After few days, they did a volte face and replied on 24 February 2020,

"In continuation of your online RTI application vide Registration No DIRFS/R/E/20/00002 dated May 1, 2020 and our earlier reply letter number CFSL(K)/19-20/20/II/RTI-55/SS/475 dated February 4, 2020, the required information is furnished below: 1. Some additional records related to the RTI application have been found which contain the Electropherogram as sought in this RTI query. This information pertains to the third party, hence it cannot be provided"."

On 22 October 2022, it was reported that the CFSL has again refused to share the Electropherogram report as requested by Sayak Sen through his RTI filed in September the same year. The CFSL cited sections 8(1)(A), (E) and 11(1) of the Right to Information Act, 2005, in its defence to not disclose the report. The fact that Section 8(1) of RTI act states that disclosure of an artefact would prejudicially affect the sovereignty and integrity of India, the security, strategic and economic interests of the State, raised more suspicion in the minds of the Netaji followers.

=== Handwriting Analysis of Bhagwanji ===
Anuj Dhar approached B Lal Kapoor a retired Chief Examiner of Questioned Documents, top most position held by any Indian Govt official with respect to handwriting verification, with a set of handwriting of Bhagwanji and Netaji. Once B Lal gave a positive report about matches found, he was asked to join Mukherjee Commission to do the same job. This time he went through numerous writings from Bhagwanji and Netaji both in English and Bengali and came to the conclusion that both handwritings belong to the same person.

Justice Mukherjee was obliged to seek examination from Government experts in this regard who provided negative report. Compared to B Lal's report the official report was short and not extensive. The report from Government experts mentioned finding similarities in English handwriting but not in Bengali handwriting.

The handwritings were later verified by Curt Baggett a famous expert from USA, and concluded "Based upon thorough analysis of these items and application of accepted forensic examination tools, principles and techniques, it is my professional expert opinion that the same person authored both the writing on the known (proved as letters written by Bose) and on the questioned documents (accessed from Roy and other revolutionaries by the authors)."

In a recent webcast veteran handwriting expert Ashok Kashyap also confirmed that volumes of handwriting cannot be forged so perfectly.

== Counter claims and refutations ==
Netaji's family has long been distancing itself from Gumnami Baba or Bhagwanji and has abhorred the possibility of Netaji being Bhagwanji almost in all possible occasions. Sugata Bose, grand nephew of Netaji called it a "travesty of history", while another grand nephew Chandra kumar Bose observed, "it is a 'criminal offence' to term 'Gumnami Baba' as Netaji in disguise without any documentary or photographic evidence to support it"

Eminent researcher, author Dr Purabi Roy, a proponent of the theory that Netaji's final days were in fact in Russia and not Taihoku, noted that calling Gumnami Baba as Netaji in disguise is mere sensationalism. She mentioned about Vishwambhar Nath Arora, a former principal of a college in Faizabad, visiting Gumnami baba's residence post his death and discovering cartons of cigarette and bottles of Scotch Whisky. Netaji was never known to be an alcoholic in his life.

V N Arora's testimony in front of Justice Sahai commission never mentions any thing about whiskey bottles though.

== Justice Mukherjee commission ==
Justice Manoj Kumar Mukherjee commission was set up in 1999, to investigate whether Netaji perished in a plane crash in 1945 or not. He came across the story of Bhagwanji when journalist Ashok Tandon and Shakti Singh, the landlord of Ram Bhawan, approached him with details about Bhagwanji. They also mentioned about the petition filed by Lalita bose claiming Bhagwanji to be Netaji.

The commission visited the Faizabad treasury and out of 2600 items found from Bhagwanji's place, 700 were sent to Kolkata for research. The commission took the testimony of 31 witnesses in this regard.

Most important were of those who had seen Bhagwanji face to face and had also seen Netaji. Durga Prasad Pandey, Srikant Sharma and Apurba Chandra Ghosh testified that Bhagwanji was Netaji and they have met both Netaji in the past and later Bhagwanji multiple times to clear any possible doubt. Mr Ghosh also added that once Bhagwanji enquired about one Bahadur who used to be a guard at Netaji's Elgin Road house and also asked if there is still a calendar with Maa Kali's photo in Netaji's room. Justice Mukherjee found their witnesses considerable.

Another set of witnesses deposed in front the commission who had seen Bhagwanji face to face. Dr Priyabrat Banerjee a doctor from Faizabad, his wife Rita Banerjee and her mother Bithi Chatterjee recounted their experiences of meeting Bhagwanji. Father of Dr. P Banerjee, Dr. T C Banerjee once treated Bhagwanji and was convinced that he is none but Netaji as he had seen Netaji before. According to Banerjee couple, they used to visit Bhagwanji very often and converse with him face to face. They used to ask questions in Bengali and Bhagwanji used to respond in Hindi, with a thick Bengali accent though. Rita Banerjee narrated an incident when upon asking Bhagwanji whether he felt offended due to their frequent probing, he responded in a poignant tone -

"রাগ? যার নিজের মা বাবা থাকতে মা বাবা নেই, নিজের ভাই বোন থাকতে ভাই বোন নেই, নিজের দেশকে নিজের বলার অধিকার নেই, সে কি রাগ করতে পারে? অভিমান করতে পারে" (A man who is deprived of his own parents and siblings, who can't call his country his own, can only feel hurt. He has no right to get angry)

Justice Mukherjee had to set aside their testimony as they had never seen Netaji in person and their testimony can be termed hearsay at best.

Upon receiving the official DNA analysis report and handwriting report which concluded as Bhagwanji not being Netaji, justice Mukherjee had no choice but to declare that Bhagwanji was not Netaji.

Interview exposure: In a casual discussion with film maker Amlan Kusum Ghosh, justice Mukherjee mentioned off-the-record that he was 100% sure that Bhagwanji was Netaji, as that was the most sensible view. Unbeknownst to him, the discussion got captured in camera and was telecast in different channels causing much controversy and uproar.

== Allahabad High Court verdict ==
In 2010, another writ petition, no. 10877(M/B), was filed by Shakti Singh, the current owner of Ram Bhawan, to return all the items collected by Justice Mukherjee commission to Faizabad treasury.

The Allahabad high court while passing the judgement in 2013, made several important observations on how prior commissions have worked and what compelled Justice Mukherjee to accept official DNA result as a proof to dismiss Bhagwanji being Netaji. The high court raised concern about accepting DNA test as full and final and commented as follows,

"Even little doubt with regard to the veracity of teeth will compel a man of common prudence not to ignore the oral and other documentary evidence, that too when there was difference of opinion with regard to handwriting of Netaji compared by the experts."

The below statement made by Allahabad high court indicated that they have strong reservation about accepting the conclusion drawn by earlier investigating committees and would not rule out the possibility of Gumnami Baba being Netaji.

"79. Since still there is no conclusive finding through scientific measures with regard to Gumnami Baba, coupled with alleged accidental death of Netaji, the records and materials must be preserved and protected by all means for research scholars and future generation. Needless to say that we are trusties (Government) of the national assets. All the alleged materials and belongings of Gumnami Baba are national assets and must be protected for future generations so that at appropriate time by appropriate scientific methodological research truth may be unearthed or explored and addition may be made to Indian History with regard to life of Netaji or the person (Gumnami Baba) who has been treated as Netaji by the substantial section of public."

The court criticized Government of India for being lackadaisical in handling the matter of Netaji's disappearance and made following observations.

"84. So far as mystery with regard to the death of Netaji Subhash Chandra Bose in plane crash is concerned, it is for the Government of India to take a decision, more so when without assigning any reason, the report of Mukherjee Commission has been rejected."

Apart from ordering the state government of UP to establish a museum and preserve Gumnami Baba's belongings scientifically and also directing justice Mukherjee commission to return the items taken during investigation, it ordered setting up another committee to find out the identity of Gumnami Baba.

"C) The Government of U.P is further directed to consider for appointment of a committee consisting of a team of experts and higher officers, headed by a Retired Judge of High Court, to hold an enquiry with regard to the identity of late Gumnami Baba alias Bhagwan Ji who resided in Ram Bhawan, Faizabad and cremated on 18.9.1985 (supra). Let a decision be taken expeditiously, say within a period of three months."

== Justice Sahai commission ==
In 2016, Vishnu Sahai Commission was formed following the order of Allahabad High Court.

After 3 years of inquiry and deposition of 45 witnesses, justice Vishnu Sahai came to the following conclusions.

1. "He was a Bengali;
2. He was well-versed in Bengali, English and Hindi languages;
3. He was an extraordinarily well-read person because a very large number of books in Bengali, English and Hindi, on a large number of subjects, were found in that portion of Ram Bhawan, Faizabad in which he lived;
4. He was very well-informed about war, politics and current affairs;
5. There was an air of authority in his voice/tone, similar to that in the voice/tone of Netaji Subhash Chandra Bose;
6. He had tremendous will-power and self-control which enabled him to live the last 10 years of his life in Ayodhya and Faizabad behind a curtain;
7. People with whom he used to talk from behind a curtain were mesmerized after listening to him;
8. He spent a considerable time in pooja and meditation;
9. He was fond of good things of life like music, cigar and food;
10. He was an admirer of Subhash Chandra Bose but whenever rumour started spreading that he was Netaji Subhash Chandra Bose, he immediately changed his house; and
11. He was disillusioned with the State of Governance in India".
- 29 of the witnesses claimed that Bhagwanji was Netaji
- 8 of the witnesses dismissed the claim that Bhagwanji was Netaji. All but one of them were family members of Netaji.
- One Shitala Singh testified that Bhagwanji was K D Upadhyay a murderer at large. His claim was outrightly rejected due to lack of evidence.
- Dr R P Mishra, a retired surgeon and very close follower of Bhagwanji described Bhagwanji like his own grandfather. Justice Sahai noted that it's a pity that Dr Mishra being most knowledgeable in this regard is not willing to disclose much about Bhagwanji.
- The rest of the witnesses claimed that Swami Sharadanandaji of Shoulmari was in fact Netaji and not Bhagwanji. Their claim was outrightly rejected for the want of evidence.

Jayanti Rakshit grand daughter of Sarat Chandra Bose, elder brother of Netaji, and her husband Amiya Nath Rakshit had visited Faizabad later in mid 2000. After speaking to local people and meeting investigating journalists, they were convinced that Gumnami Baba was their granduncle Netaji. They were the first witnesses to be examined by Justice Sahai, who rejected their claim as mere hearsay.

There was only one witness Ayodhya Prasad Gupta, who had seen both Netaji and Bhagwanji and testified that both were in fact same person. Justice Sahai dismissed his claim citing the clauses mentioned above and also owing to the fact the Mr Gupta falsely claimed of testifying in front of Mukherjee commission.

3 investigating journalist Anuj Dhar, Chandrachur Ghose and Ashok Tandon were also questioned. They produced their respective extensive research as exhibits and also testified that Bhagwanji was Netaji. Some important revelations were highlighted by Mr Tandon. -

- "A list was sent to Leela Roy and in one of the lists, it was mentioned 'photo of mother and father' ( it was not mentioned whose mother and father) Leela Roy sent to him photos of Janaki Nath Bose and Smt.Prabhawati Devi, father and mother respectively of Netaji Subhash Chandra Bose."
- "Vishwanath Roy wrote a letter to Gumnami Baba mentioning the day he came in 1923 along with Deshbandhu and Gumnami Baba gave a speech in connection with Vidhan Sabha elections he decided that he was his Guru"
- "A small slip was found wherein in Bangla it was mentioned -

"^{হরিপুরার থেকে ওয়েলিংটন পর্যন্ত যা ঘটেছিল তা যদি না ঘটত, তাহলে জীবণটা হয়ত অন্যদিকে মোড় নিত}" ( In English it means that if what happened between Haripura and Wellington had not happened then life could have gone in a different direction). At Haripura Netaji Subhash Chandra Bose was elected as Congress President and in Wellington he resigned from the said post."

Justice Sahai was moved by the set of evidences and commented -

"I have bestowed my anxious consideration to the claim of Chandrachur Ghose that there was a very strong possibility that Gumnami Baba alias Bhagwanji and Netaji Subhash Chandra Bose were one and the same person. It should be borne in mind that Judicial Commissions of Enquiry (like the present) do not reach conclusions on a very strong possibility; they only reach one when there is a very high degree of probability of the likelihood of something being true."

But he finally rejected their claims citing the DNA result and the fact none of them have seen Bhagwanji and all their work is based on hearsay.

Rita Banerjee who testified in Mukherjee commission, deposed again. Out of all the witnesses she was the one who had seen Bhagwanji face to face for the longest duration. Her testimony was rejected citing 2 reasons mentioned above and also for the fact that she wrongly mentioned of not appearing before any other commission whereas she did appear in front of Mukherjee commission. This was made as a ground to reject her testimony.

3 witnesses Amita Singh, Nand Kumar Misra and Shiv Prasad Yadav had seen Bhagwanji face to face few times in their lives. Their testimonies were also rejected citing the first two clauses.

7 witnesses were Bose family members who outrightly rejected the idea that Netaji could possibly be spending the rest of his life as a renunciate. Dwarkanath Bose, Chitra Ghose, Nita Ghose, Krishna Ghose and Ardhendu Bose made the following statements in order to dismiss the claim.

"On account of serious afflictions and illness from which Netaji Subhash Chandra Bose suffered and his frequent confinement in Jails it is scarcely conceivable that he could have survived as a mortal human being until his late eighties, as would have been the case had he been Gumnami Baba. (Subhash Chandra Bose was born in 1897 and Gumnami Baba died on September 16, 1985)"

"Since neither the parents nor siblings of Netaji Subhash Chandra Bose lived till late eighties, considering the perilous life which Netaji Subhash Chandra Bose had lived, it is most unlikely that he would have lived till the age of 88 years"

"Briefly, it is unthinkable that the person who was Netaji would disappear into seclusion from 1945, until his death 40 years later at the age of 88 years – decades in which his beloved India lurched from crisis to crisis, beginning with the monstrous tragedy of partition on religious lines. Would Subhash Chandra Bose have idly stood by while the agonies of communalism, massive poverty and bad Government assailed the people of India? I will be quite unequivocal in saying that this is impossible."

They also added that mere discovery of certain artefacts related to Bose family in the custody of certain Bhagwanji is no way proof enough to establish him as Netaji. It is also to be noted that those items were procured by one Bijoy Nag at Bhagwanji's behest.

Ardhendu Bose, son of Sailesh Chandra Bose, younger brother of Netaji, added that although his father was the real brother of Netaji Subhash Chandra Bose and had died in March,1984 and he (his father) had heard about Gumnami Baba and very frequently at his father's residence in Bombay a lot of discussion pertaining to the identity of Gumnami Baba used to take place, had his father felt that Gumnami Baba was Netaji Subhash Chandra Bose, he would have certainly gone to visit/see him because that would have helped him to determine whether he was Netaji Subhash Chandra Bose or not.

Justice Sahai deemed that these statements hold merit and drew a conclusion accordingly

Bulbul controversy: Justice Sahai based his judgement on a letter sent by a teenage girl named Bulbul, asking Gumnami Baba to be present at a function to be held at her house on 23 January 1980, celebrating Netaji's birthday. Justice Sahai deduced that Gumnami baba couldn't be separately invited to celebrate his own birthday, had he been Netaji himself. Bulbul alias Suhita Bhattacharya was never asked to appear as witness, however, she later confirmed in an interview in a webcast that she always knew that Gumnami Baba was Netaji as told by her father Santosh Bhattacharya a frequent visitor to Gumnami Baba.

In December 2019, the commission concluded that Bhagwanji was not Subhas Chandra Bose. In its report, the commission further concluded that Bhagwanji was a follower of Bose.

== Legacy ==
For many of his followers and admirers believe that he was none other than Netaji Subhash Chandra Bose himself, spending the rest of his life as a renunciate in the state of Uttar Pradesh, after his mysterious disappearance in 1945. Nonetheless, two investigating commissions have refused to accept him as Netaji.

Bhagwanji's lectures used to be published in a Bengali monthly named "Jayashree", of which Roy was the editor. Roy's nephew Bijoy Nag later published a book named "Oi Mahamanab Asey (Here comes the great man)" which is a collection of lectures published in the Jayashree monthly. Jayasree is still actively publishing the works of Bhagwanji through various books. In the year 2020, Indrasish Bhattacharya has been appointed as the Constituent Attorney of Bijoy Kumar Nag (Jayasree Patrika Trust) to continue the works and represent the trust. He is a close associate of Sunil Krishna Gupta and Surajit Dasgupta, both deponent at the JMCI.

Bhagwanji's lectures often included matters on contemporary politics, theology, music and even metaphysics.

In April 2017, the Government of Uttar Pradesh decided to digitize all the books recovered from Gumnami Baba's belongings.

As per order passed by Allahabad High Court, Government of Uttar Pradesh under chief minister Akhilesh Yadav, allocated funds to set up a museum for public display of items used by Bhagwanji. A gallery has been dedicated to him in the "Ram Katha Sangrahalay" museum located in Ayodhya. The gallery is yet to be inaugurated.

In 2019, a film named Gumnaami, based on Anuj Dhar's book Conundrum was created which depicted Bhagwanji.

In November 2022 a film named Sannyasi Deshonayak directed by Amlan Kusum Ghosh, starring Victor Bannerjee, Saswata Chatterjee and Locket Chatterjee in lead roles got released. The film explores the life of Bhagwanji during his stay in different places of Uttar Pradesh and searches his possible identity.
