= Suhasini Das =

Bengali activist, social worker and politician

- Born: 1915; Jagannathpur, Sunamganj, Assam, British India (now Bangladesh)
- Died: 30 May 2009 (aged 93–94); Sylhet, Bangladesh
- Citizenship: British India (1915–1947); Pakistan (1947–1971); Bangladesh (1971–2009)
- Occupations: Social worker, activist
- Political party: Indian National Congress

Suhasini Das (Bengali: সুহাসিনী দাস; 1915 - 30 May 2009) was an anti-British activist, social worker and politician from Bangladesh. She was a member of the Indian National Congress and an important figure in East Bengal, before, during and after Partition.

== Biography ==
Das was born in 1915 in Jagannathpur village in Sunamganj, Sylhet district, Assam Province. Her parents were Parimohan and Shobha Roy; she had two younger brothers and two younger sisters. She was married aged 18 to a businessman, Kumud Chandra Das, who owned the Kuti-Chand Press.

== Career ==
She turned her house into a centre for thread-making and charkha. In order to fund this she used the wealth inherited after the death of her husband. The charkha became a symbol of Indian independence and on 20 January 1940, Das announced that she would only wear khaddar clothes for the rest of her life.

Das was a supporter of Gandhi. In 1942, she joined the Quit India Movement, which was under Gandhi's leadership; Das was imprisoned alongside other members. In 1943, Suhasini Das was released from jail. She was also a supporter of the Non-Cooperation Movement. She later joined the Indian National Congress. During Partition in 1947, Das travelled widely in the Sylhet area, encouraging Hindu people to stay at home and tried to calm their fears. From 1946 to 1947, Das worked in a relief camp in Noakhali, one of seventeen set up by Leela Roy, following the riots which took place there. Whilst working there she contracted smallpox, and was visited by Gandhi whilst recovering.

After Partition, Das was instrumental in establishing the Rangirkul Ashram, which she ultimately became leader of.

During the war for independence in 1971, it was Das' leadership which protected the ashram. After independence, Das left politics to concentrate on her social and religious work. However, in 1973, she still attended a conference of anti-British freedom fighters in Delhi, where she highlighted to role of people from East Bengal in the struggle.

In 1986, Das attended the World Hindu Congress in Nepal. Religious tolerance and understanding was very important to her and in 1990 worked to restore faith between Hindus and Muslims after attacks on mosques and temples.

=== Awards ===
In 1997, Bangladesh gave Das its highest award for 'Social Service'.

=== Death ===
Das died on 30 May 2009 in Sylhet. She had fallen whilst taking a bath on 25 May and was admitted to hospital. At the news of her death, crowds gathered in a vigil outside the hospital.

== Legacy ==
Das published her memoirs under the title Sekaler Sylhet (Sylhet during the British Raj: Memories of Suhasini Das) in 2005. These are a vital resource for understanding Partition in East Bengal, particularly from a female perspective. These diaries recorded the rising dominance of the Muslim League and the pressures the Hindu minority felt. One of the halls at Sylhet Agricultural University is named after her.
