= Renkō-ji =

Buddhist temple in Tokyo, Japan

Coordinates: 35.6956°N 139.6549°E

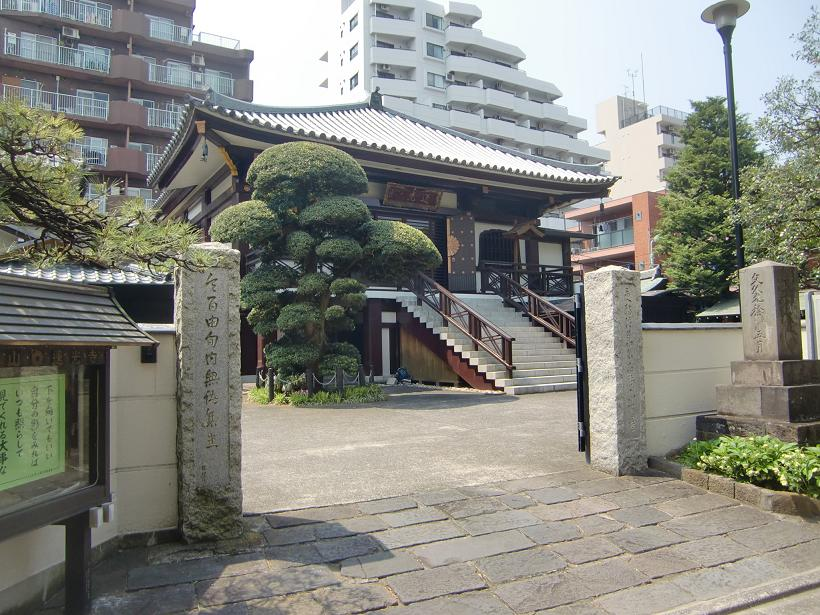
- Front view of the temple, May 2016

Religion
- Affiliation: Nichiren Buddhism

Location
- Location: 3‐30-20, Wada, Suginami-ku, Tokyo
- Country: Japan

Architecture
- Completed: 1594

Website
- None

Renkō-ji (蓮光寺, Renkōji) is a Buddhist temple in Suginami-ku, Tokyo. The small, well-preserved temple was established in 1594 inspired by the God of Wealth and Happiness. It belongs to the Nichiren sect of Buddhism that believes that human salvation lies only in the Lotus Sutra.

It is assumed to be the location of the ashes of Indian revolutionary, Subhas Chandra Bose and lieutenant general Tsunamasa Shidei both who died in a plane crash together in August 1945.

== Ashes of Subhas Chandra Bose ==
According to the findings of the G.D. Khosla Commission, appointed by the Government of India in 1970, Subhash Chandra Bose's ashes were placed in the box at Taipei following the cremation of his remains. Bose had died at Taihoku Army Hospital on August 18, 1945. The ashes of Bose came to the temple for the purpose of a funeral ceremony but Rev. Mochizuki, father of the present Chief Monk, agreed to keep them in safe custody. Bose's funeral was held at 8:00 p.m. on September 18, 1945.

Netaji's associates observe his death anniversary on August 18 at the temple annually. It is customary for Indian officials arriving in Japan to travel to Renkoji, to offer prayers and pay respect to Bose at the pagoda that protects his remains: Prime Minister Jawaharlal Nehru was the first dignitary to visit the site in October 1957. President Dr. Rajendra Prasad followed him a year later. Indira Gandhi visited in 1969. Atal Bihari Vajpayee, former Prime Minister of India, first visited the temple during his term as Foreign Minister. He later visited it during his official visit to Japan on December 9, 2001. In 2000, the then Indian Minister of External Affairs, Jaswant Singh, visited the temple in November.

The ashes of Bose are placed in a small golden pagoda.

== Controversy ==
The Justice Mukherjee Commission of Inquiry submitted its report to the Indian Government on November 8, 2005. The report was tabled in Parliament on May 17, 2006. The probe said in its report that as Bose did not die in the plane crash, the ashes at the Renkoji Temple are not his. However, the Indian Government rejected the findings of the commission.

Controversy arose when Prime Minister Narendra Modi did not visit the temple even when he was requested by the Indian High Commission in Japan.

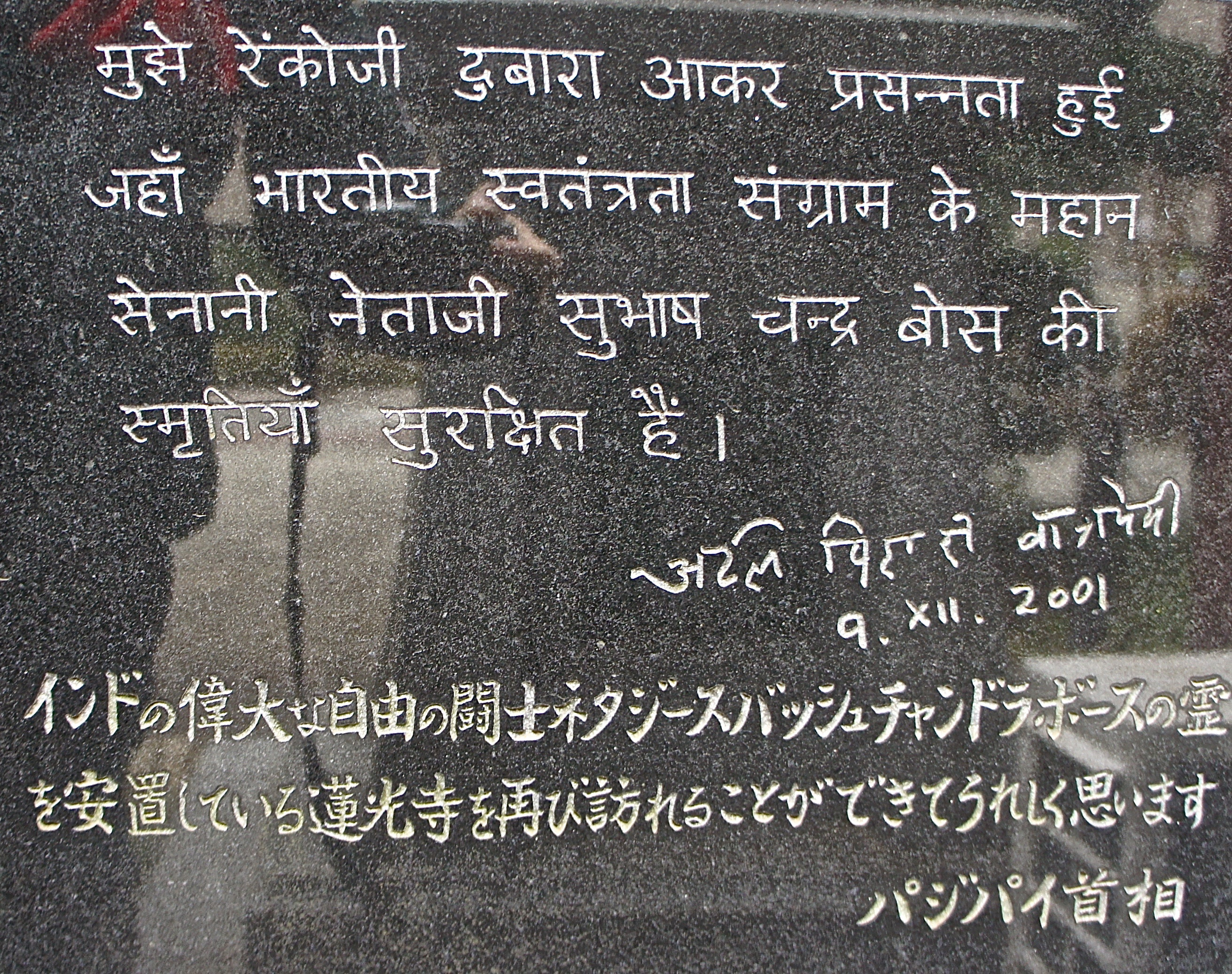
Atal Bihari Vajpayee"s message at Renkoji Temple

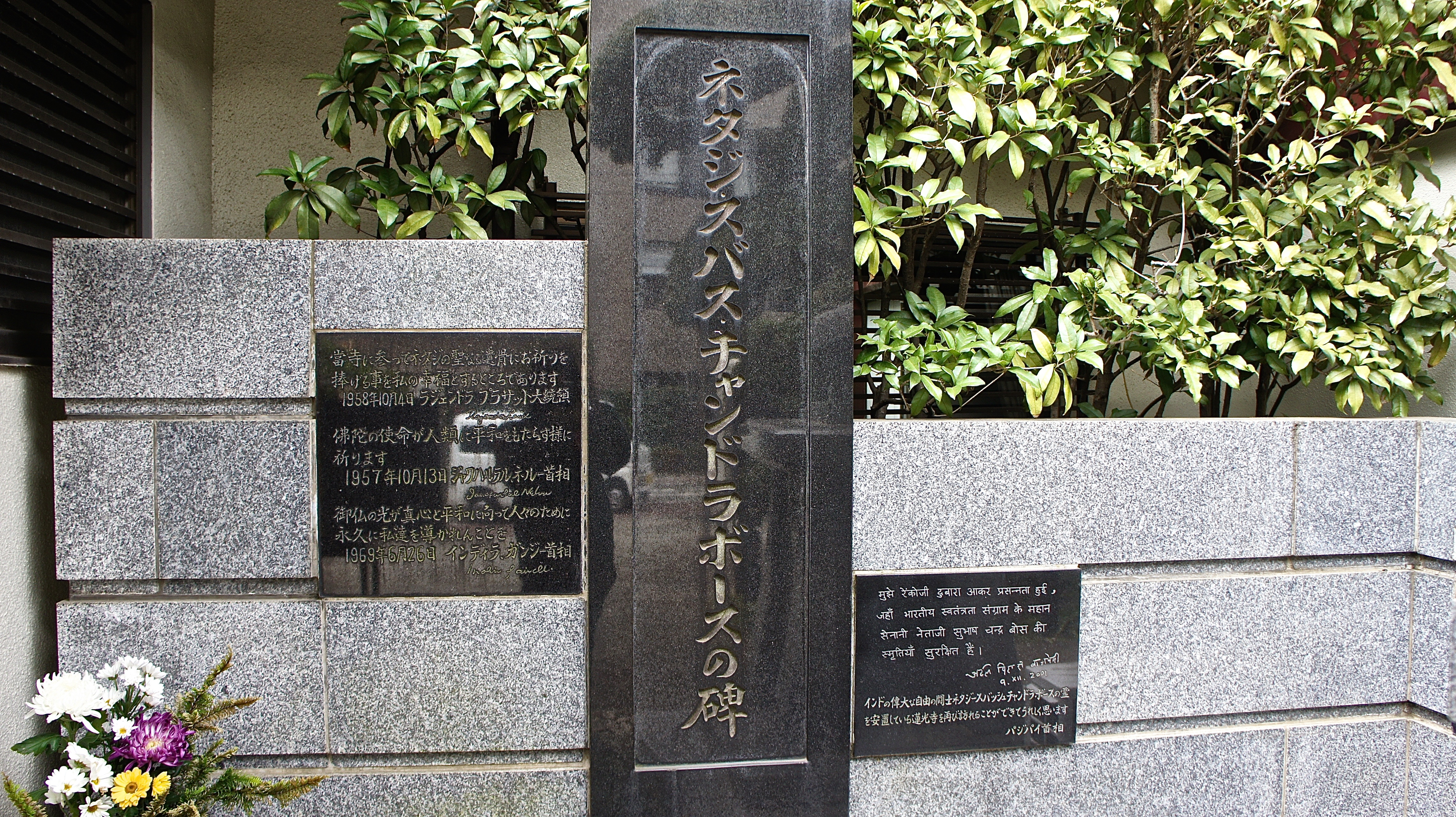
Plaques of Indian politicians message at Renkoji Temple

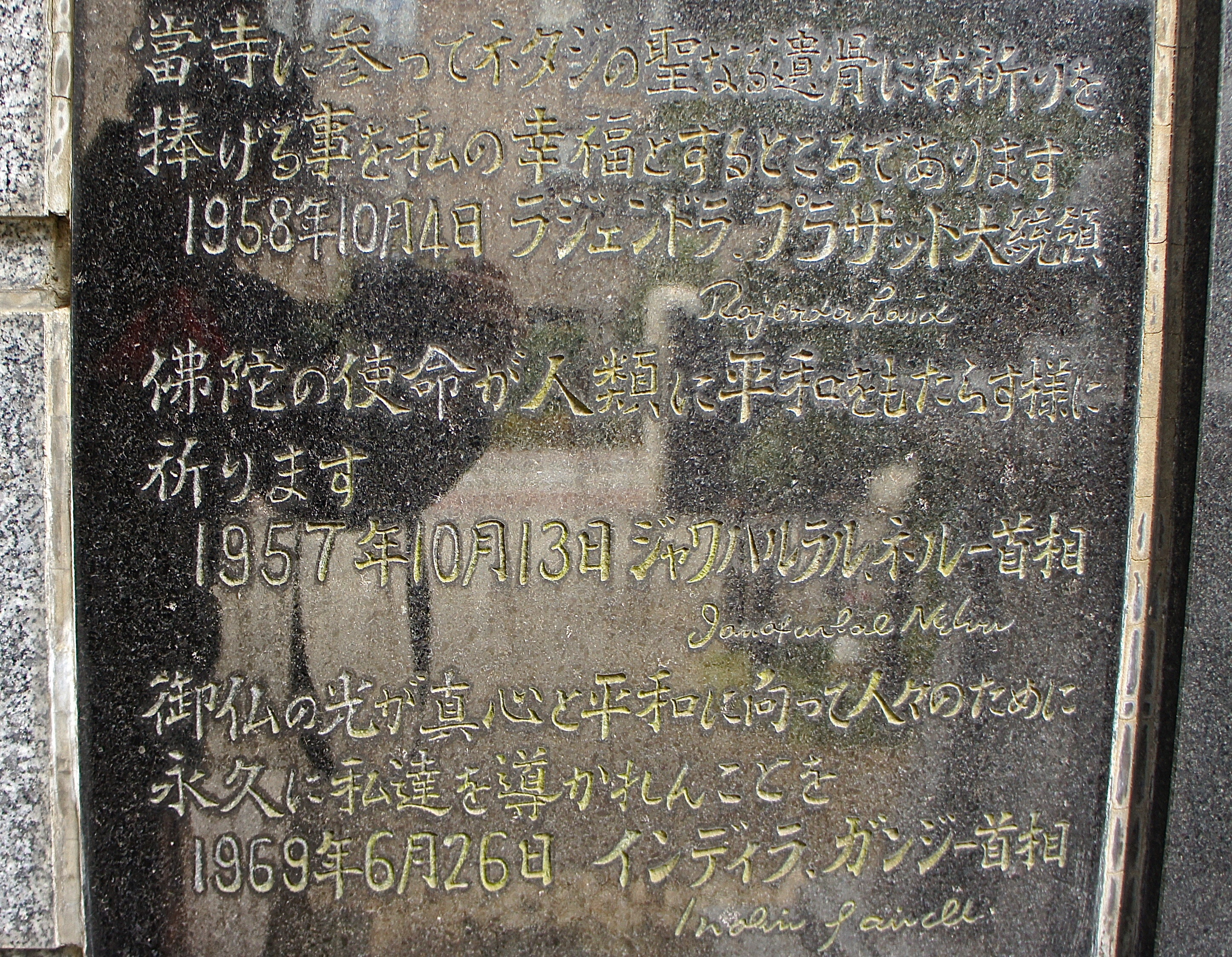
Indira Gandhi and Nehru"s message at Renkoji Temple

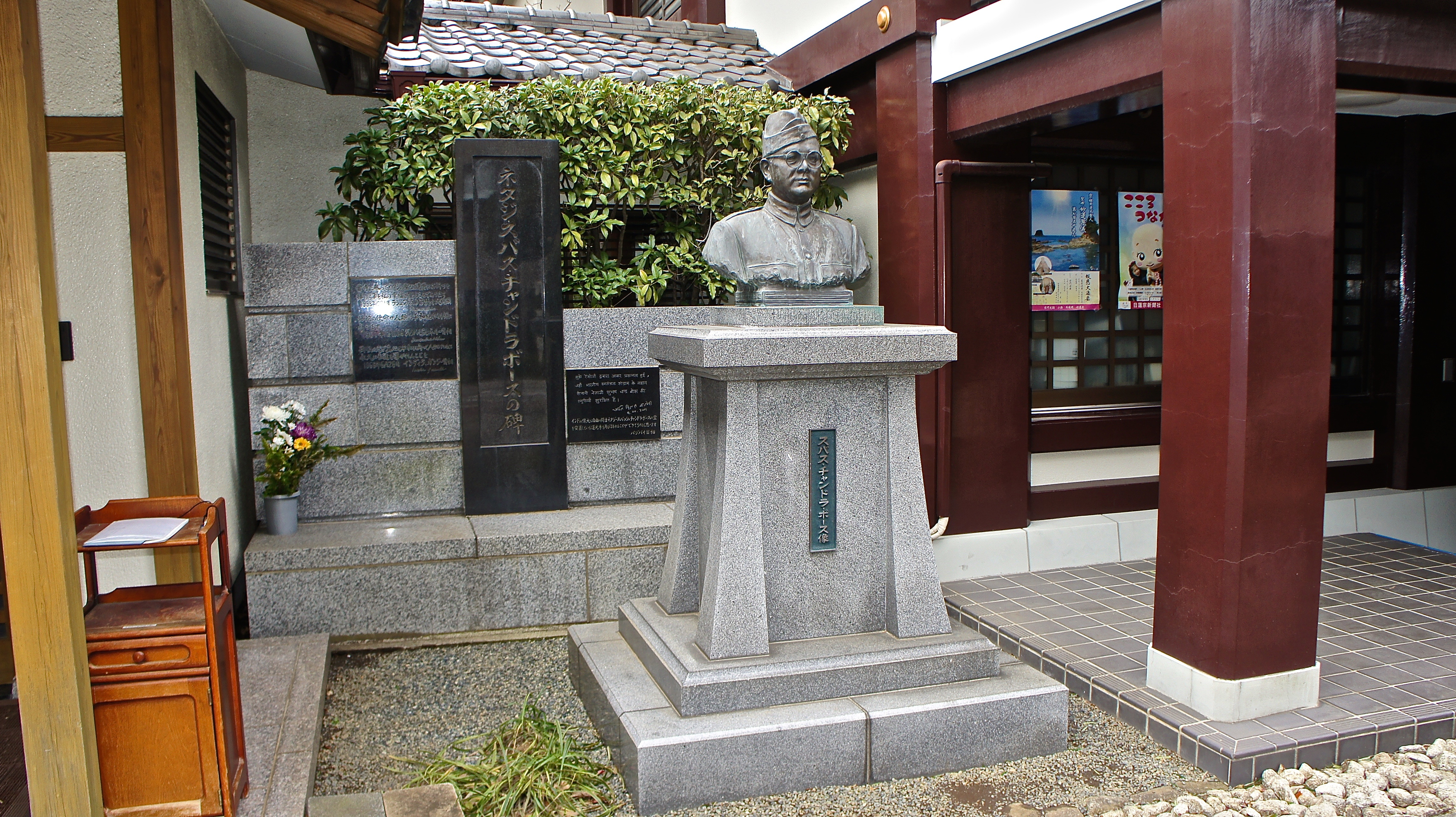
Plaques of Indian politicians message at Renkoji Temple and the bust of Subhas Chandra Bose
