= S. A. Ayer =

Indian politician (1898–1980)

S A Ayer (centre) with survivors of the Taihoku plane crash-Colonels T and Nonagaki (back and left) and Capt Arori (right).

Subbier Appadurai Ayer (14 April 1898 (in Madras Residency) – 1 April 1980) was the Minister for Publicity and Propaganda in Subhas Chandra Bose's Azad Hind Government between 1943 and 1945, and later a key defence witness during the first of the INA trials. Ayer had travelled to Bangkok in November 1940 as a Special Correspondent for Reuters before joining the Indian Independence League. In October 1943, Ayer was appointed the Minister of Publicity and Propaganda in the nascent Azad Hind Government.

Following the successful Allied Burma Campaign and the fall of Rangoon, Ayer retreated by foot out of Burma with Bose and about 100 members of the Rani of Jhansi Regiment for Bangkok and onwards to Singapore. After the Japanese surrender, Ayer was selected to leave Singapore for an unknown destination together with Bose and two other members of the Azad Hind cabinet. On Bose's last flight from Formosa to an unknown destination, there was no room for Ayer. The plane crashed on August 17, 1945, and Bose died the following day. Ayer was flown from Tokyo to Delhi in November 1945 to give evidence in the Red Fort Trials and became a key defence witness in the first trial. In 1951, Ayer published his personal accounts of the Indian National Army and Subhas Chandra Bose titled "Unto Him a Witness: The Story of Netaji Subhas Chandra Bose in East Asia" published in Bombay, 1951". Ministry of External Affairs file No 25/4/NGO - Volume 1, which used to be top secret is now available at the National Archives. SA Ayer and Munga Ramamurti, the head of Indian Independence League (IIL) in Tokyo, were accused in the file of having made away with the war chest which Netaji Subhas Chandra Bose's had created for the Indian National Army and the India Independence League with public help to sustain the freedom struggle. Assisting the duo was Colonel JG Figgess, the Military Attaché at the British High Commission. It is alleged that the Indian Government had done nothing in their dispensation to investigate the allegations and might as well have been rewarded.
