= Tsunamasa Shidei =

Imperial Japanese Army lieutenant general (1895–1945)

- 四手井 綱正
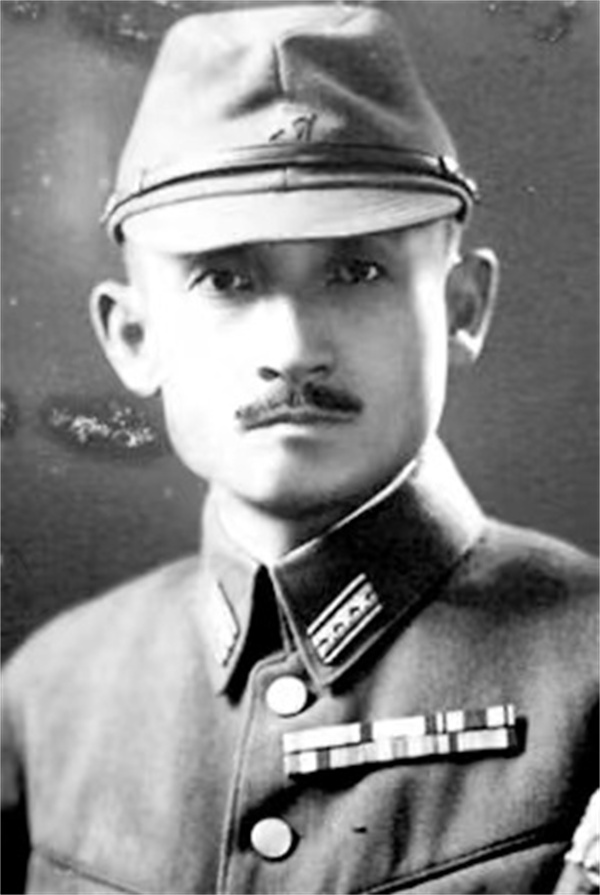
- Born: 27 January 1895; Yamashina-ku, Kyoto, Japan
- Died: 18 August 1945 (aged 50); Taihoku, Taiwan
- Cause of death: Aircraft accident
- Burial place: Renkō-ji Tokyo, Japan
- Military career
- Allegiance: Empire of Japan
- Branch: Imperial Japanese Army
- Service years: 1915–1945
- Rank: Lieutenant general
- Commands: IJA 94th Division; Burma Area Army
- Conflicts: World War II

Tsunamasa Shidei (四手井 綱正, Shidei Tsunamasa; 27 January 1895 – 18 August 1945) was a lieutenant general in the Imperial Japanese Army during World War II.

== Early life and career ==
Shidei was born on 27 January 1895 into a samurai-class family in Yamashina-ku, Kyoto. He attended military preparatory schools in Osaka and Tokyo before graduating from the 27th class of the Imperial Japanese Army Academy in 1915. After commissioning, he served as a junior officer in a cavalry company of the IJA 23rd Infantry Regiment. In 1922, he graduated from the 34th class of the Army Staff College. He subsequently served as an instructor at the Army Cavalry School, was assigned as a military attaché to Germany, and later returned as an instructor at the Army Staff College. From August 1935 to March 1939, he served as an aide-de-camp to the Emperor of Japan, and he was promoted to the rank of colonel in August 1937.

In March 1939, Shidei assumed command of the IJA 23rd Infantry Regiment. In March 1940, he returned to the Army Staff College as an instructor and, from July 1940, served as head of its Research Bureau. He was promoted to major general in August 1940.

Shidei returned to field service in December 1942 as Chief of Staff of the Japanese First Area Army, headquartered in Manchukuo, a position he held until October 1944. He was then assigned to command the newly formed IJA 94th Division. The division was organized in Taiping, Perak, to strengthen Japanese defensive preparations in Malaya following the Japanese defeat at the Battle of Imphal. It was intended to defend the region against the anticipated Allied invasion known as Operation Zipper and was deployed in defensive positions in northern Malaya.

In May 1945, Shidei was appointed Chief of Staff of the Burma Area Army after severe Japanese losses during the Battle of Meiktila and Mandalay and in Operation Dracula. However, in July 1945 he was recalled to Manchukuo to serve as Deputy Chief of Staff of the Kwantung Army.

== Death ==
On 18 August 1945, Shidei was fatally injured in an aircraft crash at Taihoku Airfield in Taihoku Prefecture, Japanese Taiwan (present-day Taipei, Taiwan). A Mitsubishi Ki-21 heavy bomber of the Imperial Japanese Army Air Service crashed shortly after takeoff. The aircraft was carrying 12 or 13 passengers, including Indian nationalist leader Subhas Chandra Bose. Both Bose and Shidei died in hospital soon after the crash. The incident occurred three days after Japan announced its surrender in World War II and approximately three months before Taiwan was transferred to the control of the Republic of China.

According to contemporary accounts, Bose and Shidei were travelling to Dairen in Japanese-occupied Manchuria. Bose reportedly intended to seek contact with representatives of the Soviet Union regarding political asylum and the future of the Indian National Army, while Shidei was expected to act as a liaison and negotiator. Alternative claims about Shidei’s death later appeared in some Chinese military publications, which asserted that he had been travelling on a different aircraft with Major General Sato Suguru that was allegedly intercepted by United States Navy forces and subsequently shot down by Kuomintang aircraft over the East China Sea. However, these claims have not been supported by primary source evidence.
