= Death of Subhas Chandra Bose =

1945 death of Indian nationalist leader

- A newspaper cutting announcing the deaths of Sidei and Bose.

Accident
- Date: August 18, 1945
- Summary: In-flight breakup
- Site: near Taihoku Airfield, Taihoku Prefecture, Taiwan (now Songshan Airport, Taipei, Taiwan)

Aircraft
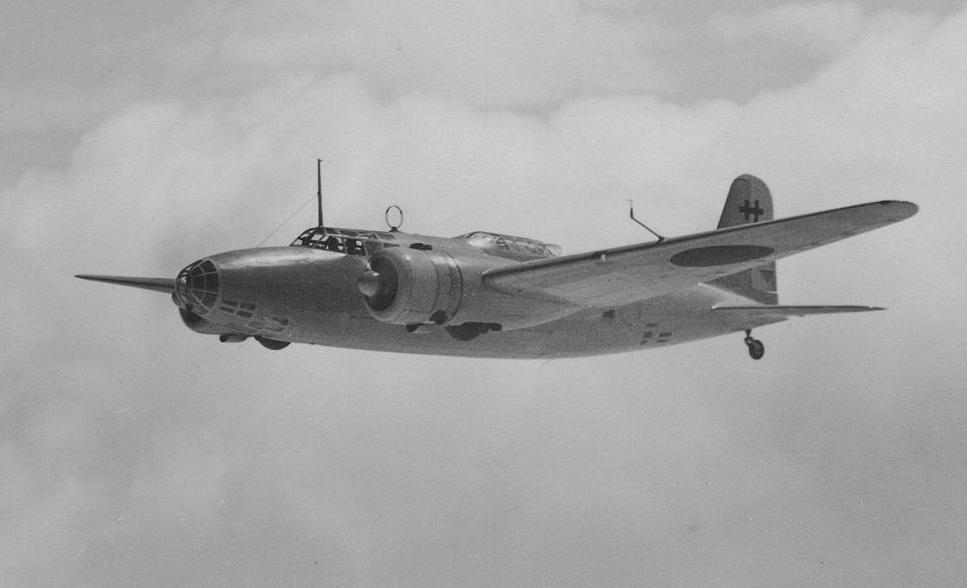
- Aircraft type: Mitsubishi Ki-21
- Aircraft name: Allied reporting name "Sally" or "Gwen".
- Operator: Imperial Japanese Army Air Service
- Flight origin: Tengah Air Base, Singapore
- Stopover: Don Muang Royal Thai Air Force Base, Bangkok, Thailand
- 1st stopover: Tan Son Nhut Air Base, Saigon, Vietnam (now Ho Chi Minh City), Vietnam
- 2nd stopover: Da Nang Air Base, Da Nang, Vietnam
- 3rd stopover: Taihoku Airfield, Taihoku Prefecture, Taihoku (now Songshan Airport, Taipei, Taiwan)
- Last stopover: Dairen Airfield, Manchuria (now Liaoning Province, China); 38°55′0″N 121°40′0″E
- Destination: Tokyo, Japan
- Occupants: 12-13
- Passengers: 9
- Crew: 3–4
- Fatalities: 4
- Survivors: 9

On 18 August 1945, a Mitsubishi Ki-21 heavy bomber belonging to the Imperial Japanese Army Air Service crashed upon take off from Taihoku Airfield in Taihoku Prefecture, Japanese Taiwan, present day Songshan Airport in Taipei, Taiwan. (Note: "If all else failed (Bose) wanted to become a prisoner of the Soviets: 'They are the only ones who will resist the British. My fate is with them. But as the Japanese plane took off from Taipei airport its engines faltered and then failed. Bose was badly burned in the crash. According to several witnesses, he died on 18 August in a Japanese military hospital, talking to the very last of India's freedom.") (Note: "The retreat was even more devastating, finally ending the dream of liberating India through military campaign. But Bose still remained optimistic, thought of regrouping after the Japanese surrender, contemplated seeking help from Soviet Russia. The Japanese agreed to provide him transport up to Manchuria from where he could travel to Russia. But on his way, on 18 August 1945 at Taihoku airport in Taiwan, he died in an air crash, which many Indians still believe never happened.") Out of the 12 or 13 passengers on board, two passengers, Indian nationalist leader Subhas Chandra Bose and Japanese Lieutenant General Tsunamasa Shidei, died in hospital in the immediate aftermath of the crash. The bomber crashed three days after Japan announced its surrender, and three months before the return of Taiwan to the Republic of China.

Bose, who had become soaked in gasoline before exiting the burning bomber, was transported to the Nanmon Military Hospital south of Taihoku, where his extensive upper-body burns were treated for six hours by the chief-surgeon Dr Taneyoshi Yoshimi, two other doctors, Dr Tsuruta and Dr Ishii, and half a dozen technical staff and nurses. Bose went into a coma and died between 9 pm and 10 pm Taihoku time. Bose's chief-of-staff, Colonel Habib ur Rahman, who had travelled with him, and who was put to lay nearby with severe burns, survived and made a full recovery. Ten years later he testified at an inquiry commission on Bose's death, the burn marks on his arms conspicuously visible. General Shidei's descendants commemorate his death every year at the Renkō-ji Temple in Tokyo, where Bose's ashes are also deposited.

Bose's death and the nature of the plane crash has been marked with numerous disputations and conspiracy theories. Many among Subhas Chandra Bose's supporters, especially in the Bengal Presidency, refused at the time and have refused since to believe either the fact or the circumstances of his death. (Note: "British and Indian commissions later established convincingly that Bose had died in Taiwan. These were legendary and apocalyptic times, however. Having witnessed the first Indian leader to fight against the British since the great mutiny of 1857, many in both Southeast Asia and India refused to accept the loss of their hero.") (Note: "There are still some in India today who believe that Bose remained alive and in Soviet custody, a once and future king of Indian independence. The legend of 'Netaji' Bose's survival helped bind together the defeated INA. In Bengal it became an assurance of the province's supreme importance in the liberation of the motherland. It sustained the morale of many across India and Southeast Asia who deplored the return of British power or felt alienated from the political settlement finally achieved by Gandhi and Nehru.) (Note: "On March 21, 1944, Subhas Bose and advanced units of the INA crossed the borders of India, entering Manipur, and by May they had advanced to the outskirts of that state's capital, Imphal. That was the closest Bose came to Bengal, where millions of his devoted followers awaited his army's "liberation." The British garrison at Imphal and its air arm withstood Bose's much larger force long enough for the monsoon rains to defer all possibility of warfare in that jungle region for the three months the British so desperately needed to strengthen their eastern wing. Bose had promised his men freedom in exchange for their blood, but the tide of battle turned against them after the 1944 rains, and in May 1945 the INA surrendered in Rangoon. Bose escaped on the last Japanese plane to leave Saigon, but he died in Formosa after a crash landing there in August. By that time, however, his death had been falsely reported so many times that a myth soon emerged in Bengal that Netaji Subhas Chandra was alive—raising another army in China or Tibet or the Soviet Union—and would return with it to "liberate" India.) (Note: "Rumours that Bose had survived and was waiting to come out of hiding and begin the final struggle for independence were rampant by the end of 1945.") (Note: "Marginalized within Congress and a target for British surveillance, Bose chose to embrace the fascist powers as allies against the British and fled India, first to Hitler's Germany, then, on a German submarine, to a Japanese-occupied Singapore. The force that he put together ... known as the Indian National Army (INA) and thus claiming to represent free India, saw action against the British in Burma but accomplished little toward the goal of a march on Delhi. ... Bose himself died in an airplane crash trying to reach Japanese-occupied territory in the last months of the war. His romantic saga, coupled with his defiant nationalism, has made Bose a near-mythic figure, not only in his native Bengal, but across India. It is this heroic, martial myth that is today remembered, rather than Bose's wartime vision of a free India under the authoritarian rule of someone like himself.")

== Death ==
=== Last months with the Indian National Army ===
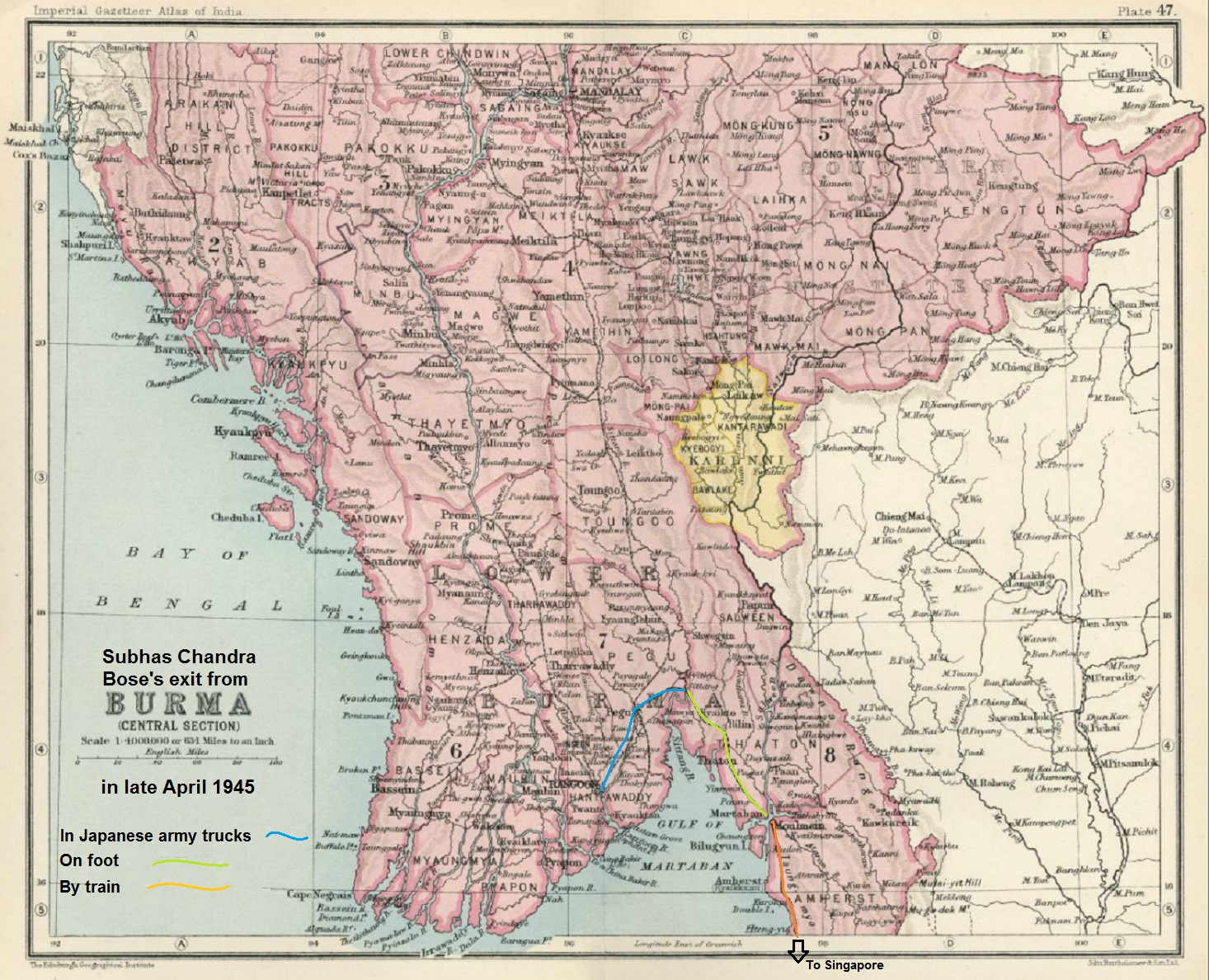
Map of Central Burma showing the route taken by Subhas Chandra Bose and his Indian National Army (INA) group of 500 from Rangoon to Moulmein. The group traveled in a Japanese military convoy until they reached the river Sittang. After crossing the river, they walked the remaining 80 miles. At Moulmein, Bose, his party, and another INA group of 500, boarded Japanese trains on the Death Railway (which had been constructed earlier by British, Australian, and Dutch prisoners of war) to arrive in Bangkok in the first week of May 1945.

During the last week of April 1945, Subhas Chandra Bose along with his senior Indian National Army (INA) officers, several hundred enlisted INA men, and nearly a hundred women from the INA's Rani of Jhansi Regiment left Rangoon by road for Moulmein in Burma. Accompanied by Lieutenant General Saburo Isoda, the head of the Japanese-INA liaison organization Hikari Kikan, their Japanese military convoy was able to reach the right bank of the Sittang river, albeit slowly. (See map 1.) However, very few vehicles were able to cross the river because of American strafing runs. Bose and his party walked the remaining 80 miles (130 km) to Moulmein over the next week. Moulmein then was the terminus of the Death Railway, constructed from 1940 to 1943 by British, Australian, and Dutch prisoners of war, linking Burma to Siam (now Thailand). At Moulmein, Bose's group was also joined by 500 men from the X-regiment, INA's first guerrilla regiment, who arrived from a different location in Lower Burma.

A year and a half earlier, 16,000 INA men and 100 women had entered Burma from Malaya. Now, less than one tenth that number left the country, arriving in Bangkok during the first week of May. The remaining nine tenths were either killed in action, died from malnutrition or injuries after the battles of Imphal and Kohima. Others were captured by the British, turned themselves in, or simply disappeared. Bose stayed in Bangkok for a month, where soon after his arrival he heard the news of Germany's surrender on May 8. Bose spent the next two months between June and July 1945 in Singapore, and in both places attempted to raise funds for billeting his soldiers or rehabilitating them if they chose to return to civilian life, which most of the women did. In his nightly radio broadcasts, Bose spoke with increasing virulence against Gandhi, who had been released from jail in 1944, and was engaged in talks with British administrators, envoys and Muslim League leaders. Some senior INA officers began to feel frustrated or disillusioned with Bose and to prepare quietly for the arrival of the British and its consequences.

During the first two weeks of August 1945, events began to unfold rapidly. With the British threatening to invade Malaya and with daily American aerial bombings, Bose's presence in Singapore became riskier by the day. His chief of staff J. R. Bhonsle suggested that he prepare to leave Singapore. On 3 August 1945, Bose received a cable from General Isoda advising him to urgently evacuate to Saigon in Japanese-controlled French Indochina (now Vietnam). On 10 August, Bose learnt that the Soviet Union had entered the war and invaded Manchuria. At the same time he heard about the atomic bombings of Hiroshima and Nagasaki. Finally, on 16 August, after being informed of the unconditional surrender of Japan, Bose decided to leave for Saigon along with a handful of his aides.

=== Last days and journeys ===
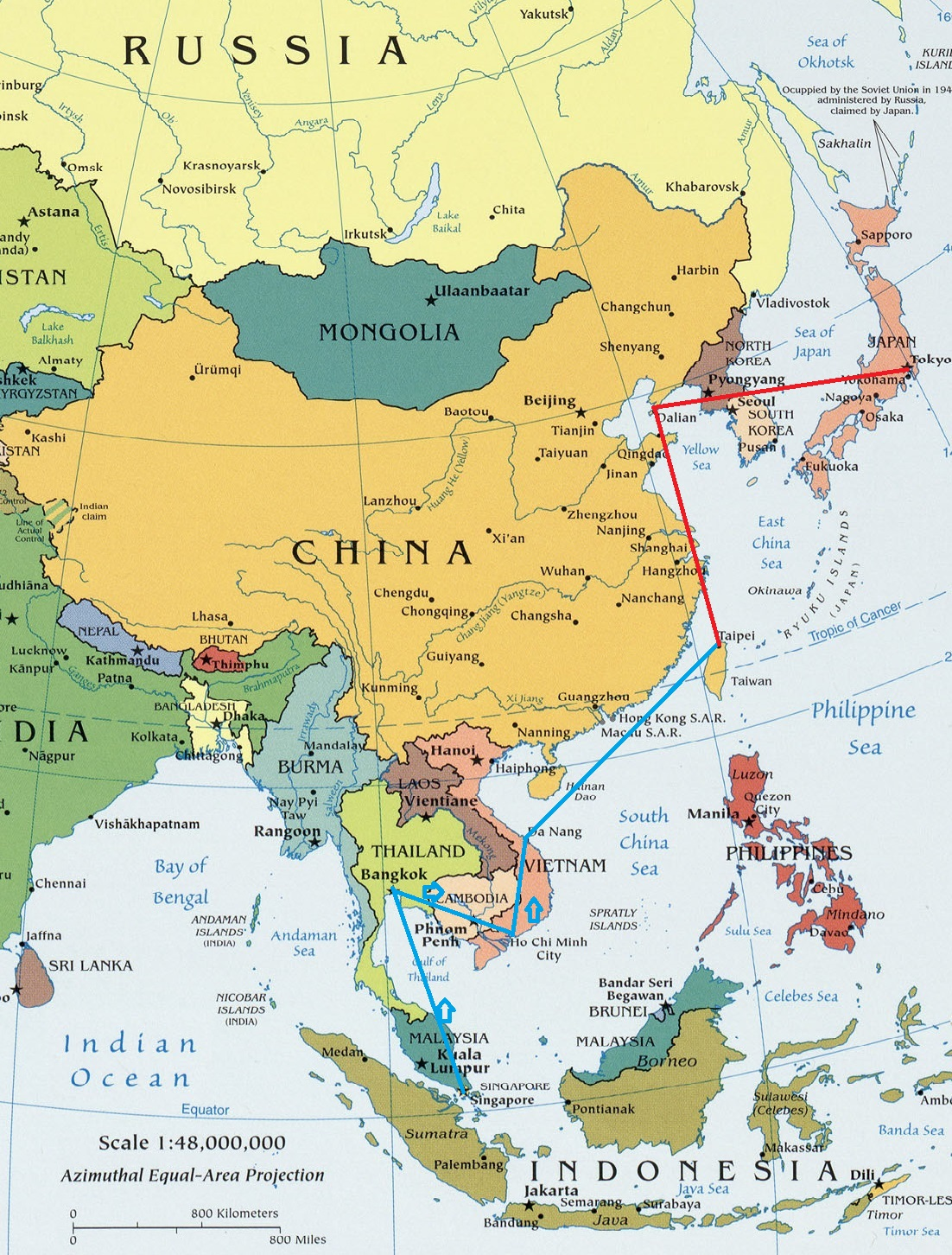
The last aeroplane journeys of Subhas Chandra Bose. Paths of completed flights are shown in blue. On 16 August 1945, he left Singapore for Bangkok, Siam (now Thailand). On either the 16th itself or on the 17th morning, he flew from Bangkok to Saigon, now Ho Chi Minh City. On the 17 August afternoon, he flew from Saigon to Tourane, French Indo-China, now Da Nang, Vietnam. Early next morning at 5 am, he left Tourane for Taihoku, Formosa, now Taipei, Taiwan. At 2:30 pm on 18 August, he left for Dairen, Manchukuo, now Dalian, China, but his plane crashed shortly after takeoff, and Bose died within a few hours in a Japanese military hospital. Had the crash not occurred the plane would have dropped off Bose at Dairen and proceeded to Tokyo along a flight path shown in red.

Reliable strands of historical narrative about Bose's last days are united up to this point. However, they separate briefly for the period between 16 August, when Bose received news of Japan's surrender in Singapore, and shortly after noon on 17 August, when Bose and his party arrived at Saigon airport from Saigon city to board a plane. (See map 2.)

In one version, Bose flew out from Singapore to Saigon, stopping briefly in Bangkok, on the 16th. Soon after arriving in Saigon, he visited Field Marshal Hisaichi Terauchi, head of the Japanese forces in Southeast Asia, and requested him to arrange a flight to the Soviet Union. Although until the day before, the Soviet Union had been a belligerent of Japan, it was also seen, at least by Bose, as increasingly anti-British, and, consequently, a possible base of his future operations against the British Raj. Terauchi, in turn, cabled Japan's Imperial General Headquarters (IGHQ) in Tokyo for permission, which was quickly denied. In the words of historian Joyce Chapman Lebra, the IGHQ felt that it "would be unfair of Bose to write off Japan and go over to Soviet Union after receiving so much help from Japan. Terauchi added in talking with Bose that it would be unreasonable for him to take a step which was opposed by the Japanese." Privately, however, Terauchi still felt sympathy for Bose—one that had been formed during their two-year-long association. He somehow managed to arrange room for Bose on a flight leaving Saigon on the morning of 17 August 1945 bound for Tokyo, but stopping en route in Dairen, Manchuria—which was still Japanese-occupied, but toward which the Soviet army was fast approaching—where Bose was to have disembarked and to have awaited his fate at the hand of the Soviets.

In another version, Bose left Singapore with his party on the 16th and stopped en route in Bangkok, surprising INA officer in-charge there, J. R. Bhonsle, who quickly made arrangements for Bose's overnight stay. Word of Bose's arrival, however, got out, and soon local members of the Indian Independence League (IIL), the INA, and the Thai Indian business community turned up at the hotel. According to historian Peter Ward Fay, Bose "sat up half the night holding court—and in the morning flew on to Saigon, this time accompanied by General Isoda ..." Arriving in Saigon, late in the morning, there was little time to visit Field Marshal Terauchi, who was in Dalat in the Central Highlands of French Indo-China, an hour away by plane. Consequently, Isoda himself, without consulting with higher ups, arranged room for Bose on a flight leaving around noon.

In the third sketchier version, Bose left Singapore on the 17th. According to historian Christopher Bayly and Tim Harper, "On 17 August he issued a final order of the day, dissolving the INA with the words, 'The roads to Delhi are many and Delhi still remains our goal.' He then flew out to China via French Indo-China. If all else failed he wanted to become a prisoner of the Soviets: 'They are the only ones who will resist the British. My fate is with them'."

Around noon on 17 August, the strands again reunite. At Saigon airport, a Mitsubishi Ki-21 heavy bomber, of the type code named Sally by the Allies, was waiting for Bose and his party. In addition to Bose, the INA group comprised Colonel Habibur Rahman, his secretary; S. A. Ayer, a member of his cabinet; Major Abid Hasan, his old associate who had made the hazardous submarine journey from Germany to Sumatra in 1943; and three others. To their dismay, they learned upon arrival that there was room for only one INA passenger. Bose complained, and the beleaguered General Isoda gave in and hurriedly arranged for a second seat. Bose chose Habibur Rahman to accompany him. It was understood that the others in the INA party would follow him on later flights. There was further delay at Saigon airport. According to historian Joyce Chapman Lebra, "a gift of treasure contributed by local Indians was presented to Bose as he was about to board the plane. The two heavy strong-boxes added overweight to the plane's full load." Sometime between noon and 2 PM, the twin-engine plane took off with 12 or 13 people aboard: a crew of three or four, a group of Japanese army and air force officers, including Lieutenant-General Tsunamasa Shidei, the Vice Chief of Staff of the Japanese Kwantung Army, which although fast retreating in Manchuria still held the Manchurian peninsula, and Bose and Rahman. Bose was sitting a little to the rear of the portside wing; the bomber, under normal circumstances, carried a crew of five.

That these flights were possible a few days after Japan's surrender was the result of a lack of clarity about what had occurred. Although Japan had unconditionally surrendered, when Emperor Hirohito had made his announcement over the radio, he had used formal Japanese, not entirely intelligible to ordinary people and, instead of using the word "surrender" (in Japanese), had mentioned only "abiding by the terms of the Potsdam Declaration." Consequently, many people, especially in Japanese-occupied territories, were unsure if anything had significantly changed, allowing a window of a few days for the Japanese air force to continue flying. Although the Japanese and Bose were tight lipped about the destination of the bomber, it was widely assumed by Bose's staff left behind in Saigon that the plane was bound for Dairen on the Manchurian peninsula, which, as stated above, was still under Japanese control. Bose had been talking for over a year about the importance of making contact with the communists, both Russian and Chinese. In 1944, he had asked a minister in his cabinet, Anand Mohan Sahay to travel to Tokyo for the purposes of making contact with the Soviet ambassador, Jacob Malik. However, after consulting the Japanese foreign minister Mamoru Shigemitsu, Sahay decided against it. In May 1945, Sahay had again written to Shigemitsu requesting him to contact Soviet authorities on behalf of Bose; again the reply had been in the negative. Bose had been continually querying General Isoda for over a year about the Japanese army's readiness in Manchuria. After the war, the Japanese confirmed to the British investigators and later Indian commissions of inquiry, that plane was indeed bound for Dairen, and that fellow passenger General Shidea of the Kwantung Army, was to have disembarked with Bose in Dairen and to have served as the main liaison and negotiator for Bose's transfer into Soviet controlled territory in Manchuria.

The plane had flown north. By the time it was near the northern coast of French Indo-China, darkness had begun to close in, and the pilot decided to make an unscheduled stop in Tourane (now Da Nang, Vietnam). The passengers stayed overnight at a hotel, and the crew, worried that the plane was overloaded, shed some 500 pounds of equipment and luggage, and also refueled the plane. Before dawn the next morning, the group flew out again, this time east to Taihoku, Formosa (now Taipei, Taiwan), which was a scheduled stop, arriving there around noon on 18 August 1945. During the two-hour stop in Taihoku, the plane was again refueled, while the passengers ate lunch. The chief pilot and the ground engineer, and Major Kono, seemed concerned about the portside engine, and, once all the passengers were on board, the engine was tested by repeatedly throttling up and down. The concerns allayed, the plane finally took off, in different accounts, as early as 2 pm, and as late as 2:30 pm, watched by ground engineers.

=== Crash ===
Just as the bomber was leaving the standard path taken by aircraft during take-off, the passengers inside heard a loud sound, similar to an engine backfiring. Airport mechanics saw something fall out of the plane. It was the portside engine, or a part of it, and the propeller. The plane swung wildly to the right and plummeted, crashing, breaking into two, and exploding into flames. Inside, the chief pilot, copilot and General Shidei were instantly killed. Rahman was stunned, passing out briefly, and Bose, although conscious and not fatally hurt, was soaked in gasoline. When Rahman came to, he and Bose attempted to leave by the rear door but found it blocked by the luggage. They then decided to run through the flames and exit from the front. The ground staff, now approaching the plane, saw two people staggering towards them, one of whom had become a human torch. The human torch turned out to be Bose, whose gasoline-soaked clothes had instantly ignited. Rahman and a few others managed to smother the flames, but also noticed that Bose's face and head appeared badly burned. According to Joyce Chapman Lebra, "A truck which served as ambulance rushed Bose and the other passengers to the Nanmon Military Hospital south of Taihoku." The airport personnel called Dr. Taneyoshi Yoshimi, the surgeon-in-charge at the hospital at around 3 pm. Bose was conscious and mostly coherent when they reached the hospital, and for some time thereafter. Bose was naked, except for a blanket wrapped around him, and Dr. Yoshimi immediately saw evidence of third-degree burns on many parts of the body, especially on his chest, doubting very much that he would live. Dr. Yoshimi promptly began to treat Bose and was assisted by Dr. Tsuruta. According to historian Leonard A. Gordon, who interviewed all the hospital personnel later:

A disinfectant, Rivamol, was put over most of his body and then a white ointment was applied and he was bandaged over most of his body. Dr. Yoshimi gave Bose four injections of Vita Camphor and two of Digitamine for his weakened heart. These were given about every 30 minutes. Since his body had lost fluids quickly upon being burnt, he was given Ringer solution intravenously. A third doctor, Dr. Ishii gave him a blood transfusion. An orderly, Kazuo Mitsui, an army private, was in the room and several nurses were assisting. Bose still had a clear head which Dr. Yoshimi found remarkable for someone with such severe injuries.

Soon, in spite of the treatment, Bose went into a coma. He died a few hours later, between 9 and 10 pm.

Bose's body was cremated in the main Taihoku crematorium two days later, 20 August 1945. On 23 August 1945, the Japanese news agency Domei announced the death of Bose and Shidea. On 7 September a Japanese officer, Lieutenant Tatsuo Hayashida, carried Bose's ashes to Tokyo, and the following morning they were handed to the president of the Tokyo Indian Independence League, Rama Murti. On 14 September a memorial service was held for Bose in Tokyo and a few days later the ashes were turned over to the priest of the Renkōji Temple of Nichiren Buddhism in Tokyo. There they have remained ever since.

Among the INA personnel, there was widespread disbelief, shock, and trauma. Most affected were the young Tamil Indians from Malaya and Singapore, men and women, who comprised the bulk of the civilians who had enlisted in the INA. The professional soldiers in the INA, most of whom were Punjabis, faced an uncertain future, with many fatalistically expecting reprisals from the British. In India the Indian National Congress's official line was succinctly expressed in a letter Mahatma Gandhi wrote to Rajkumari Amrit Kaur. Said Gandhi, "Subhas Bose has died well. He was undoubtedly a patriot, though misguided." Many congressmen had not forgiven Bose for quarreling with Gandhi and for collaborating with what they considered was Japanese fascism. The Indian soldiers in the British Indian army, some two and a half million of whom had fought during the Second World War, were conflicted about the INA. Some saw the INA as traitors and wanted them punished; others felt more sympathetic. The British Raj, though never seriously threatened by the INA, was to try 300 INA officers for treason in the INA trials, but was to eventually backtrack in the face of its own end.

== Conspiracies of Bose's survival ==
=== Immediate post-war conspiracies ===
Subhas Chandra Bose's exploits had become legendary long before his physical death in August 1945. (Note: "THE MYTH: But Bose had become a myth in his own lifetime, dating from the time he eluded house arrest and escaped from India to Afghanistan and Europe. Thousands of Indians refused to believe he was dead. Man is very mortal but myths die hard.") From the time he had escaped house arrest in Calcutta in 1940, rumours had been rife in India about whether or not he was alive, and if the latter, where he was and what he was doing. His appearance in faraway Germany in 1941 created a sense of mystery about his activities. With Congress leaders in jail in the wake of the Quit India Resolution in August 1942 and the Indian public starved for political news, Bose's radio broadcasts from Berlin charting radical plans for India's liberation during a time when the star of Germany was still rising and that of Britain was at its lowest, made him an object of adulation among many in India and southeast Asia. During his two years in Germany, according to historian Romain Hayes, "If Bose gradually obtained respect in Berlin, in Tokyo he earned fervent admiration and was seen very much as an 'Indian samurai'." Thus it was that when Bose appeared in Southeast Asia in July 1943, brought mysteriously on German and Japanese submarines, he was already a figure of mythical size and reach.

After Bose's death, Bose's other lieutenants, who were to have accompanied him to Manchuria, but were left behind in Saigon, never saw a body. There were no photographs taken of the injured or deceased Bose, neither was a death certificate issued. According to historian Leonard A. Gordon,

The war was ending; all was chaotic in East Asia, and there were no official reports released by the Governments of India or Britain. These governments did nothing to prevent the confusion. Even members of India's Interim Government in 1946 waffled on the matter. Bose had disappeared several times earlier in his life; so rumours began again in 1945 and a powerful myth grew.

For these two reasons, when news of Bose's death was reported, many in the INA refused to believe it and were able to transmit their disbelief to a wider public. The source of the widespread skepticism in the INA might have been Bose's senior officer J. R. Bhonsle. When a Japanese delegation, which included General Isoda, visited Bhonsle on 19 August 1945 to break the news and offer condolences, he responded by telling Isoda that Bose had not died, rather his disappearance has been covered up. Even Mahatma Gandhi swiftly said that he was skeptical about the air crash, but changed his mind after meeting the Indian survivor Habibur Rahman. As in 1940, before long, in 1945, rumours were rife about what had happened to Bose, whether he was in Soviet-held Manchuria, a prisoner of the Soviet army, or whether he had gone into hiding with the cooperation of the Soviet army. Lakshmi Swaminathan, of the all-female Rani of Jhansi regiment of the INA, later Lakshmi Sahgal, said in spring 1946 that she thought Bose was in China. Many rumours spoke of Bose preparing for his final march on Delhi. This was the time when Bose began to be sighted by people, one sighter claiming "he had met Bose in a third-class compartment of the Bombay express on a Thursday."

=== Further conspiracies ===
In the 1950s, stories appeared in which Bose had become a sadhu, or Hindu renunciant. The best-known and most intricate of the renunciant tales of Subhas Bose, and one which, according to historian Leonard A. Gordon, may "properly be called a myth," was told in the early 1960s. Some associates of Bose, from two decades before, had formed an organization, the "Subhasbadi Janata", to promote this story in which Bose was now the chief sadhu of an ashram (or hermitage) in Shaulmari (also Shoulmari) in North Bengal. The Janata brought out published material, including several newspapers and magazines. Of these, some were long lived and some short, but all, by their number, attempted to create the illusion of the story's newsworthiness. The chief sadhu himself vigorously denied being Bose. Several intimates of Bose, including some politicians, who met with the sadhu, supported the denials. Even so, the Subhasbadi Janata was able to create an elaborate chronology of Bose's post-war activities.

According to this chronology, after his return to India, Bose returned to the vocation of his youth: he became a Hindu renunciant. He attended unseen Gandhi's cremation in Delhi in early February 1948; walked across and around India several times; became a yogi at a Shiva temple in Bareilly in north central India from 1956 to 1959; became a practitioner of herbal medicine and effected several cures, including one of tuberculosis; and established the Shaulmari Ashram in 1959, taking the religious name Srimat Saradanandaji. (Note: From Sanskrit śrīmat (voc., hon.) sir + śārǎdā 1. myth. a title of Saraswati, 2. myth. a title of Durga + ānand (noun, m.) 1. joy, delight; 2. enjoyment, contentment, + jī (hon.) an expression of respect or affection (used with proper names). In McGregor, Ronald Stuart (1993), The Oxford Hindi-English Dictionary, Oxford University Press, pp. 956, 948, 86, 374 resp, ISBN 978-0-19-864339-5) Bose, moreover, was engaged in tapasya, or meditation, to free the world, his goals having been broadened, after his first goal—freeing India—was achieved. His attempt to do so, however, and to assume his true identity, was being thwarted jointly by political parties, newspapers, the Indian government, even foreign governments.

Others stories appeared, spun by the Janata and by others. Bose was still in the Soviet Union or the People's Republic of China; attended the Indian prime minister Jawaharlal Nehru's cremation in 1964, but, this time, neglecting to disallow a Janata-published newspaper to photograph him; and gave notice to the Janata of his return to Calcutta, for which several much publicized rallies were organized. Bose did not appear. The Janata eventually broke up, its reputation marred by successive non-appearances of its protagonist. The real sadhu of Shaulmari, who continued to deny he was Bose, died in 1977. It was also claimed that Nikita Khrushchev had reportedly told an interpreter during his New Delhi visit that Bose could be produced within 45 days if Nehru wished.

Still other stories or hoaxes—elucidated with conspiracies and accompanied with fake photographs—of the now-aging Bose being in the Soviet Union or China had traction well into the early 80s. Bose was seen in a photograph taken in Beijing, inexplicably parading with the Chinese Red Army. Bose was said to be in a Soviet Gulag. The Soviet leadership was said to be blackmailing Nehru, and later, Indira Gandhi, with the threat of releasing Bose. An Indian member of parliament, Samar Guha, released in 1979 what he claimed was a contemporaneous photograph of Bose. This turned out to have been doctored, comprising one-half Bose and one-half his elder brother Sarat Chandra Bose. Guha also charged Nehru with having had knowledge of Bose's incarceration in the Soviet Union even in the 1950s, a charge Guha recanted after he was sued.

For the remainder of the century and into the next, more conspiracies continued to appear. Most prominently, a retired judge, who had been appointed by the Indian Government in 1999 to undertake an enquiry into Bose's death, brought public notice to another sannyasi or renunciant, "Gumnami Baba," (Note: From Hindustani gumnām (adj): whose name is lost, anonymous; + bābā: colloq. a senior or respected male (term of address). In McGregor, Ronald Stuart (1993), The Oxford Hindi-English Dictionary, Oxford University Press, pp. 270–271, 725 resp, ISBN 978-0-19-864339-5) also known by his religious name, "Bhagwanji," (Note: From Sanskrit, bhagwān: 1 (adj) glorious, divine, to be adored, worshipful; 2 (noun, m.) the supreme being (especially as equated with Viṣṇu-Kṛṣṇa); ... 4 any revered person (term of address). In McGregor, Ronald Stuart (1993), The Oxford Hindi-English Dictionary, Oxford University Press, p. 726, ISBN 978-0-19-864339-5) who was said to have lived in the town of Faizabad in the Indian state of Uttar Pradesh. According to historian Sugata Bose,

In October 2002, he (the judge) sent letters to members of the Bose family asking them to donate one milliliter of blood for a DNA match with "one Gumnami Baba," who "some persons" had claimed was "none other than Netaji Subhas Chandra Bose. The evidence naturally did not support this bizarre theory.

Earlier, in 1977, summing up the extant Bose's possible survival, historian Joyce Chapman Lebra had written,

Stories persist that Netaji has become a sannyasi (holy man) and has been seen in the Naga hill country of Assam; that he was a member of a Mongolian trade delegation in Peking; that he lives in Russia; that he is in the Chinese Army. ... Pictures have been produced to prove that Netaji is still alive. Bose's family have announced at times that he is in hiding and will return to India when the time is right. In February 1966, Suresh Chandra Bose announced in the press that his brother would return in March. To date, however, Bose has not reappeared to contradict the evidence that he died in the crash on Taiwan. But the myth lives on.

According to historians Christopher Bayly and Tim Harper:

The legend of 'Netaji' Bose's survival helped bind together the defeated INA. In Bengal it became an assurance of the province's supreme importance in the liberation of the motherland. It sustained the morale of many across India and Southeast Asia who deplored the return of British power or felt alienated from the political settlement finally achieved by Gandhi and Nehru.

Amid all this, Joyce Chapman Lebra, wrote in 2008:

The Japanese have always wished to return the ashes to Bengal, as they believe that a soul will not rest in peace until the ashes are brought home. The prospect of having Netaji's ashes in Bengal, however, has been known to incite rioting, as happened one year at the annual 23 January convention at the Netaji Research Bureau in Calcutta. Hot-headed young Bengali radicals broke into the convention hall where Fujiwara, the founder of the INA, was to address the assemblage and shouted abuse at him. Apparently some newspaper had published a rumour that Fujiwara had brought Netaji's ashes back.

== Reports and inquiries ==
=== Figgess Report 1946 ===
Confronted with rumours about Bose, which had begun to spread within days of his death, the Supreme Allied Command, South-east Asia, under Mountbatten, tasked Colonel (later Sir) John Figgess, an intelligence officer, with investigating Bose's death. Figgess's report, submitted on 25 July 1946, however, was confidential, being work done in Indian Political Intelligence (IPI), a partially secret branch of the Government of India. Figgess was interviewed in the 1980s by Leonard A. Gordon and confirmed writing the report. In 1997, the British Government made most of the IPI files available for public viewing in the India Office Records of the British Library. However, the Figgess report was not among them. A photocopy of the Figess report was soon anonymously donated for public viewing to the British Library in the European manuscripts collection, as Eur. MSS. c 785. Good candidates for the donor, according to Leonard Gordon, are Figgess himself, who had died in 1997, or more likely another British intelligence officer in wartime India, Hugh Toye, the author of a book (Toye 1959).

The crucial paragraph in the Figgess report (by Colonel John Figgess, Indian Political Intelligence, 25 July 1946,) is:

As a result of a series of interrogations of individuals named in the following paragraphs it is confirmed as certain that S.C. Bose died in a Taihoku Military Hospital (Nammon Ward) sometime between 1700 hours and 2000 hours local time on the August 18, 1945. The cause of death was heart failure resulting from multiple burns and shock. All the persons named below were interrogated at different times but the several accounts of the event agree both in substance and detail at all points where the knowledge of the subjects could have been deemed to be based on common experience. The possibility of a pre-arranged fabrication must be excluded since most of the individuals concerned had no opportunity of contact with one another prior to interrogation.

The remaining four pages of the Figgess report contain interviews with two survivors of the plane crash, Lt. Cols. Nonogaki and Sakai, with Dr. Yoshimi, who treated Bose in the hospital and with others involved in post-death arrangements. In 1979, Leonard Gordon himself interviewed "Lt. Cols. Nonogaki and Sakai, and, (in addition, plane-crash survivor) Major Kono; Dr. Yoshimi ...; the Japanese orderly who sat in the room through these treatments; and the Japanese officer, Lt. Hayashita, who carried Bose's ashes from the crematorium in Taipei to Japan."

The Figgess report and Leonard Gordon's investigations confirm four facts:

- The crash near Taihoku airport on 18 August 1945 of a plane on which Subhas Chandra Bose was a passenger;
- Bose's death in the nearby military hospital on the same day;
- Bose's cremation in Taihoku; and
- transfer of Bose's ashes to Tokyo.

=== Shah Nawaz Committee 1956 ===
With the goal of quelling the rumours about what happened to Subhas Chandra Bose after mid-August 1945, the Government of India in 1956 appointed a three-man committee headed by Shah Nawaz Khan. Khan was at the time a Member of Parliament as well as a former Lieutenant Colonel in the Indian National Army and the best-known defendant in the INA Trials of a decade before. The other members of the committee were S. N. Maitra, ICS, who was nominated by the Government of West Bengal, and Suresh Chandra Bose, an elder brother of Bose. The committee is referred to as the "Shah Nawaj Committee" or the "Netaji Inquiry Committee."

From April to July 1956, the committee interviewed 67 witnesses in India, Japan, Thailand, and Vietnam. In particular, the committee interviewed all the survivors of the plane crash, some of whom had scars on their bodies from burns. The committee interviewed Dr. Yoshimi, the surgeon at the Taihoku Military Hospital who treated Bose in his last hours. It also interviewed Bose's Indian companion on the flight, Habib ur Rahman, who, after the partition, had moved to Pakistan and had burn scars from the plane crash. Although there were minor discrepancies here and there in the evidence, the first two members of the committee, Khan and Maitra, concluded that Bose had died in the plane crash in Taihoku on 18 August 1945.

Bose's brother, Suresh Chandra Bose, however, after having signed off on the initial conclusions, declined to sign the final report. He, moreover, wrote a dissenting note in which he claimed that the other members and staff of the Shah Nawaz Committee had deliberately withheld some crucial evidence from him, that the committee had been directed by Jawaharlal Nehru to infer death by plane crash, and that the other committee members, along with Bengal's chief minister B. C. Roy, had pressured him bluntly to sign the conclusions of their final report.

According to historian Leonard A. Gordon,

Out of the 181-page repetitious document that constitutes Suresh Bose's report, one main principle for dealing with the evidence emerges: if two or more stories by witnesses have any discrepancies between them, then the whole testimony of the witnesses involved is thereby discredited and assumed to be false. Using this principle, Bose is able to ... find that there was no crash and that his brother lives. There also appears to be one other half-stated assumption: Subhas Bose could not die before India achieved her freedom. Therefore, he did not die in the plane crash said to have taken place on August 18, 1945.

=== Khosla Commission 1970 ===
In 1977, two decades after the Shah Nawaz committee had reported its findings, historian Joyce Chapman Lebra wrote about Suresh Chandra Bose's dissenting note: "Whatever Mr Bose's motives in issuing his minority report, he has helped to perpetuate until the present the faith that Subhas Chandra Bose still lives." In fact, during the early 1960s, the rumours about Subhas Bose's extant forms only increased.

In 1970, the Government of India appointed a new commission to enquire into the "disappearance" of Bose. With a view to heading off more minority reports, this time it was a "one-man commission." The single investigator was G. D. Khosla, a retired chief justice of the Punjab High Court. As Justice Khosla had other duties, he submitted his report only in 1974.

Justice Khosla, who brought his legal background to bear on the issue in a methodical fashion, not only concurred with the earlier reports of Figess and the Shah Nawaz Committee on the main facts of Bose's death, but also evaluated the alternative explanations of Bose's disappearance and the motives of those promoting stories of Netaji sightings. Historian Leonard A. Gordon writes:

Justice Khosla suggests the motives of many of the story-purveyors are less than altruistic. Some, he says, have clearly been driven by political goals or simply wanted to call attention to themselves. His patience in listening to some tales is surely remarkable. What could he, or anyone, have thought as he listened to the testimony of P. M. Karapurkar, agent of the Central Bank of India at Sholapur, who '... claimed that he receives direct messages from Bose by tuning his body like a radio receiving apparatus.

=== Mukherjee Commission 2005 ===
In 1999, following a court order, the Indian government appointed retired Supreme Court judge Manoj Kumar Mukherjee to probe the death of Bose. The commission perused hundreds of files on Bose's death drawn from several countries and visited Japan, Russia and Taiwan. Although oral accounts were in favour of the plane crash, the commission concluded that those accounts could not be relied upon and that there was a secret plan to ensure Bose's safe passage to the USSR with the knowledge of Japanese authorities and Habibur Rahman. It though failed to make any progress about Bose's activities, after the staged crash. The commission also concluded that the ashes kept at the Renkoji temple (which supposedly contain skeletal remains) reported to be Bose's, were of Ichiro Okura, a Japanese soldier who died of cardiac arrest but asked for a DNA test. It also determined Gumnami Baba to be different from Subhas Bose in light of a DNA profiling test.

The Mukherjee Commission submitted its report to on 8 November 2005 after 3 extensions and it was tabled in the Indian Parliament on 17 May 2006. The Indian Government rejected the findings of the commission.

Key findings of the report (esp. about their rejection of the plane-crash-theory) have been criticized and the report contains other glaring inaccuracies. Sugata Bose notes that Mukherjee himself admitted to harbouring a preconceived notion about Bose being alive and living as an ascetic. He also blames the commission for entertaining the most preposterous and fanciful of all stories, thus adding to the confusion and for failing to distinguish between the highly probable and utterly impossible. Gordon notes that the report had failed to list all of the people who were interviewed by the committee (including him) and that it mis-listed and mis-titled many of the books, used as sources.

=== Government of Japan report 1956, declassified September 2016 ===
An investigative report by the Government of Japan titled "Investigation on the cause of death and other matters of the late Subhas Chandra Bose" was declassified on 1 September 2016. It concluded that Bose died in a plane crash in Taiwan on 18 August 1945. The report was completed in January 1956 and was handed over to the Indian embassy in Tokyo, but was not made public for more than 60 years as it was classified. According to the report, just after takeoff a propeller blade on the aeroplane in which Bose was traveling broke off and the engine fell off the plane, which then crashed and burst into flames. When Bose exited it his clothes caught fire and he was severely burned. He was admitted to hospital, and although he was conscious and able to carry on a conversation for some time he died several hours later.
