= Joyce Lebra =

American historian (1925–2021)

Joyce Lebra (December 21, 1925 – October 10, 2021), also known as Joyce Chapman Lebra, was an American historian of Japan and India.

== Biography ==
Lebra spent her childhood in Honolulu and received her B.A. and M.A. in Asian studies from the University of Minnesota. She received a Ph.D. in Japanese history from Harvard/Radcliffe, and was the first woman Ph.D. in Japanese history in the U.S.

She lived in Japan a total of ten years and three and a half in India doing research on the history of Japan and India. She was professor of Japanese history and Indian history at the University of Colorado until her retirement.

She led three research teams to Asia to research women’s roles in the work force, each of which resulted in a book (1977, 1980 and 1984). She has written several other books including works on the Indian National Army and Lakshmibai, the Rani of Jhansi, and has written chapters in three books and some fifty articles in scholarly journals.

She has received many awards, including an honorary Doctor of Humane Letters degree from the University of Minnesota in 1996, two years on a Fulbright fellowship in Japan and one and a half years on Fulbright fellowships in India. Other fellowships include a Japan Foundation fellowship, a National Endowment for the Humanities fellowship, one from the American Association of University Women, one from Australian National University, and others. She is noted in Who’s Who in America, Who’s Who of American Women, and Who’s Who in American Education. She has lectured widely at University of Oxford, the London School of Economics, University of Tokyo, Waseda University, Nagoya University, University of Hong Kong, the Institute of Southeast Asian Studies in Singapore, the Netaji Research Bureau in Calcutta, Melbourne and Monash Universities, Macquarie University, University of Sydney, University of Queensland, and Australian National University in Canberra. She delivered the Harmon Memorial Lecture at the United States Air Force Academy in 1991.

== Selected works ==
Historical novels

- Durga’s Sword (1995)
- Sugar And Smoke (2005, writing as Napua Chapman)
- Scent of Sake (2009)

Non-fiction

- Jungle Alliance; Japan And The Indian National Army (1971)
- Okuma Shigenobu; Statesman Of Meiji Japan (1973)
- Japanese-trained Armies In Southeast Asia (1977)
- Women In Changing Japan (1977)
- Chinese Women In Southeast Asia (1980)
- Women And Work In India (1984)
- The Rani Of Jhansi; A Study In Female Heroism In India (1986)
- Shaping Hawai’i; The Voices Of Women (1999)
- Japan’s Greater East Asia Co-prosperity Sphere (1975, editor)

== Honours ==
- Order of the Rising Sun, 3rd Class, Gold Rays with Neck Ribbon: 2021
