= R. S. McGregor =

Philologist

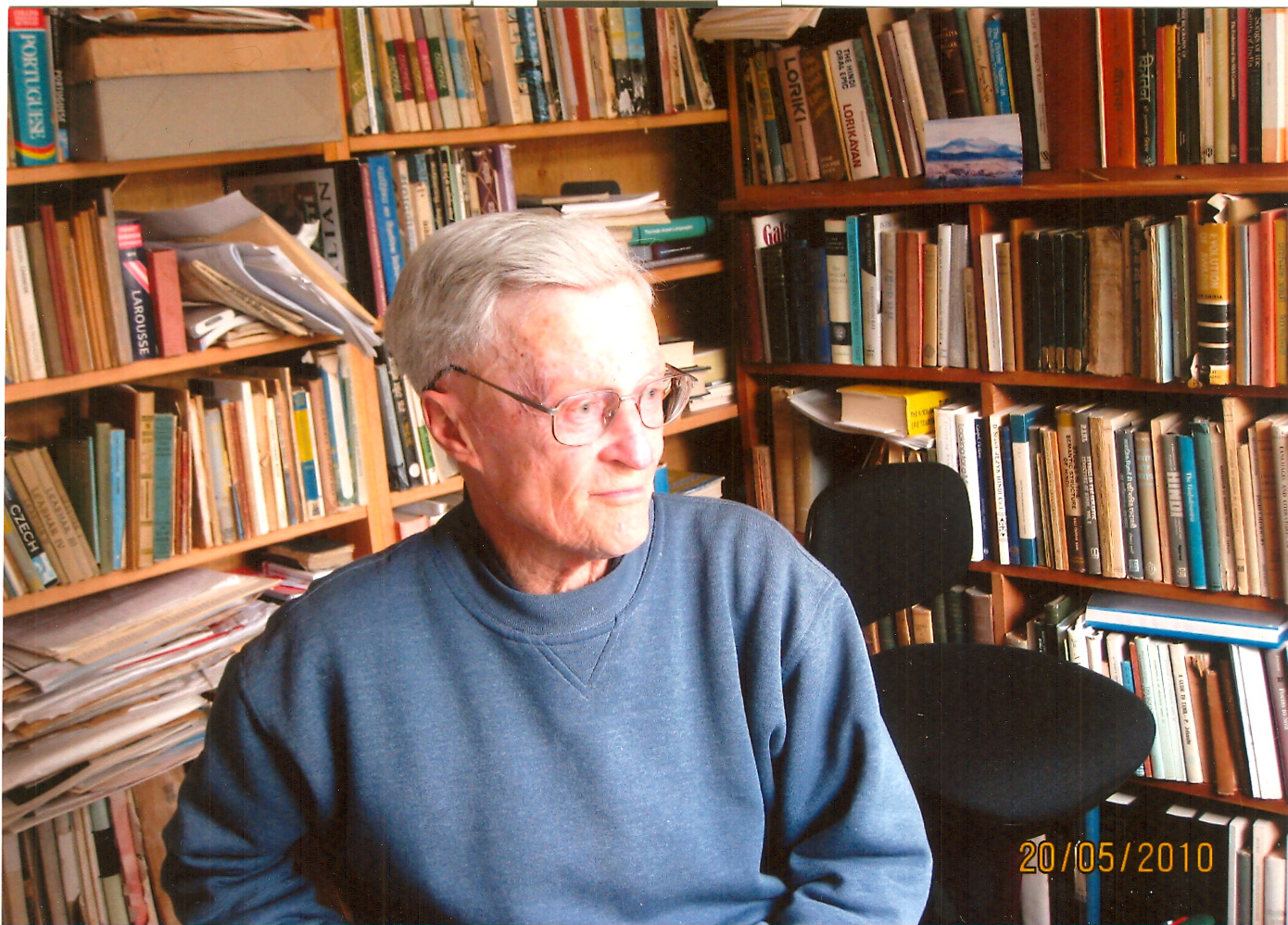
- Education: University of Canterbury
- Alma mater: University of Allahabad

Ronald Stuart McGregor, commonly R. S. McGregor or Stuart McGregor (24 October 1929 – 19 August 2013), was a philologist of the Hindi language. Best known as editor of the Oxford Hindi-English Dictionary, a standard reference work published in 1993 after a sustained effort of twenty years, McGregor was a Fellow of Wolfson College and retired as Reader in Hindi at the University of Cambridge.

== Biography ==
McGregor was born in New Zealand in 1929. His parents were Scottish. He was educated at Ashburton High School before going up to Canterbury University College, and then to Merton College, Oxford to read English, matriculating in 1952, taking his BA in 1954, and studying Germanic Philology until 1956. He held posts at SOAS University of London and then went to the University of Allahabad in 1959–60 to study Hindi. In 1964 he took up the post of University Lecturer in Hindi at Cambridge in 1964.

His PhD thesis, The Language of Indrajit of Orchā – A Study of Early Braj Bhāsā Prose, was published in 1968.

McGregor married Elaine Langdon in 1960; they had two sons.

== Publications ==
- McGregor, Ronald Stuart (1995) [1986]. Outline of Hindi Grammar: With Exercises. Oxford University Press. ISBN 978-0-19-870008-1.
- McGregor, R. S. (2007). The Language of Indrajit of Orchā: A Study of Early Braj Bhāsā Prose. Cambridge University Press. ISBN 978-0-521-05228-3.
- McGregor, R. S., ed. (1992). Devotional Literature in South Asia: Current Research, 1985–1988. Cambridge University Press. ISBN 978-0-521-41311-4.
- McGregor, Ronald Stuart (1993). The Oxford Hindi-English Dictionary. Oxford University Press. ISBN 978-0-19-864339-5.
