= Leela Roy =

Indian independence activist and politician (1900-1970)

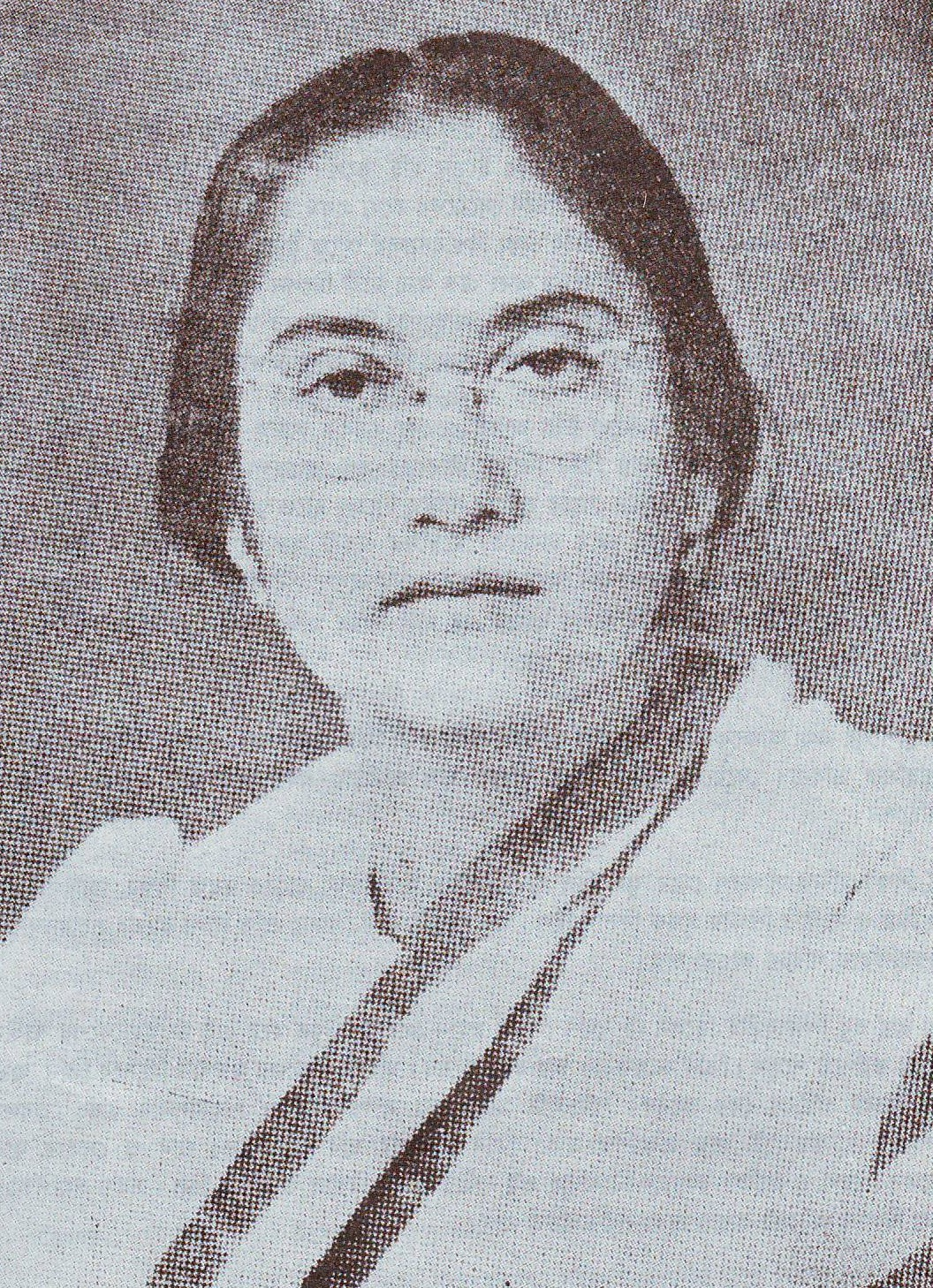
- Born: Leela Nag; 2 October 1900; Goalpara, North-East Frontier, British India
- Died: 11 June 1970 (aged 69); Calcutta, West Bengal, India
- Other name: Leelaboti Roy
- Organization(s): Deepali Sangha, Indian National Congress, Forward Bloc
- Movement: Indian Independence Movement
- Spouse: Anil Chandra Roy

Leela Roy (née Nag; 2 October 1900 – 11 June 1970) was a prominent Indian freedom fighter and reformer, and a close associate of Netaji Subhas Chandra Bose. She was born in Goalpara, Assam, to Girish Chandra Nag, who was a deputy magistrate, and her mother was Kunjalata Nag. She was the first female student of Dhaka University.

== Family ==
She was born into an upper middle class Bengali Kayastha family in Goalpara district of North-East Frontier and educated at Bethune College in Calcutta, graduating in 1917. She stood first among the girls and was awarded the 'Padmabati Gold Medal' along with a cash prize of Rs. 100 on 2 October 1917 by the department of English. Her father was Girischandra Nag. He was the tutor of Subhas Chandra Bose. She fought with university authorities and became the first woman to be admitted to the University of Dhaka and earned her M.A. degree. Co-education was not permitted in Dhaka University. The then vice chancellor, Philip Hartog, gave special permission for her admission.

== Social work ==
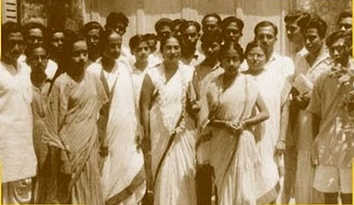
Leela Roy, along with other founder members of Samaj Sebi Sangha, 1946

She threw herself into social work and education for girls, starting the second girls school in Dhaka. She encouraged girls to learn skills and receive vocational training and emphasized the need for girls to learn martial arts to defend themselves. Over the years, she set up a number of schools and institutes for women.

She contacted Netaji Subhas Chandra Bose when he was leading the relief action after the 1921 Bengal floods. Leela Nag, then a student at Dhaka University, was instrumental in forming the Dhaka Women's Committee and, in that capacity, raised donations and relief goods to help Netaji.

In 1931, she began publishing the Jayasree Patrika, the first magazine edited, managed, and wholly contributed to by women writers. It received the blessings of many eminent personalities, including Rabindranath Tagore, who suggested its name.

== Political activity ==
Leela Nag formed a rebellion organization in December 1923 called Deepali Sangha (Dipali Sangha) in Dhaka, where combat training was given. Pritilata Waddedar took courses from there. She took part in the Civil Disobedience Movement and was imprisoned for six years. In 1938, she was nominated by Congress President, Subhas Chandra Bose to the National Planning Committee of the Congress. In 1939 she married Anil Roy. On Bose's resignation from the Congress, the couple joined him in the Forward Bloc.

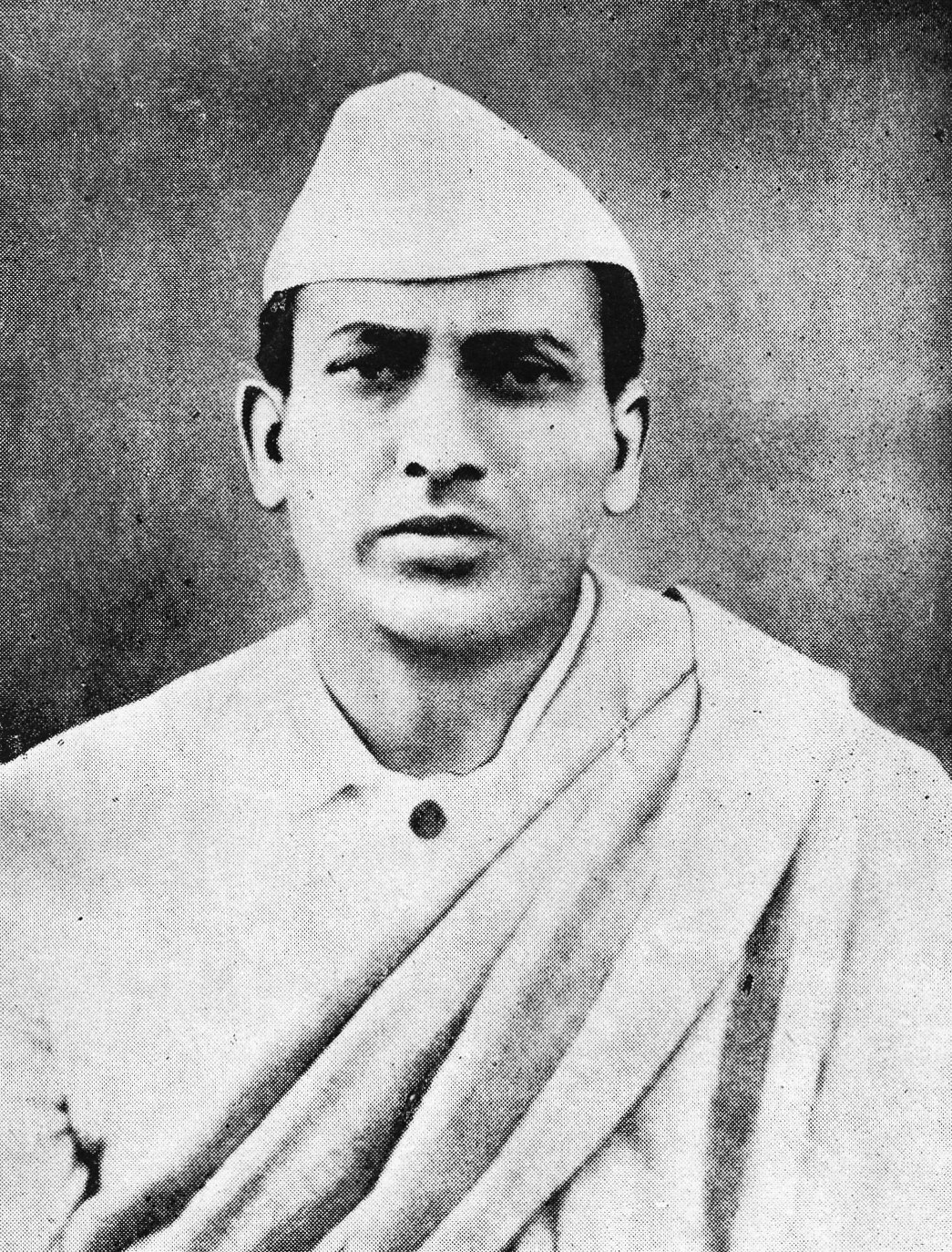
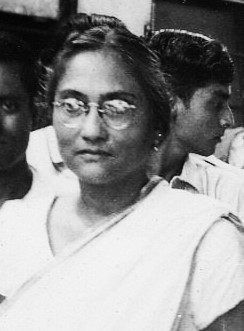
Top: Anil & Leela, a patriotic duo; Bottom (left to right): Anil Roy, Leela Roy.

In 1941, when there was a serious outburst of communal rioting in Dhaka, she, along with Sarat Chandra Bose, formed the Unity Board and National Service Brigade. In 1942, during the Quit India Movement, both she and her husband were arrested, and her magazine was forced to cease. On her release in 1946, she was elected to the Constituent Assembly of India.

During the partition violence, she met Gandhi in Noakhali. Even before Gandhiji reached there, she opened a relief center and rescued 400 women after touring on foot 90 miles in just six days. After the Partition of India, she ran homes in Calcutta for destitute and abandoned women and tried to help refugees from East Bengal. From 1946 to 1947, Roy set up seventeen relief camps in Noakhali, following the riots that took place there - activist Suhasini Das worked at one.

In 1947 she founded the Jatiya Mahila Sanghati, a women's organisation in West Bengal.

== Later years ==
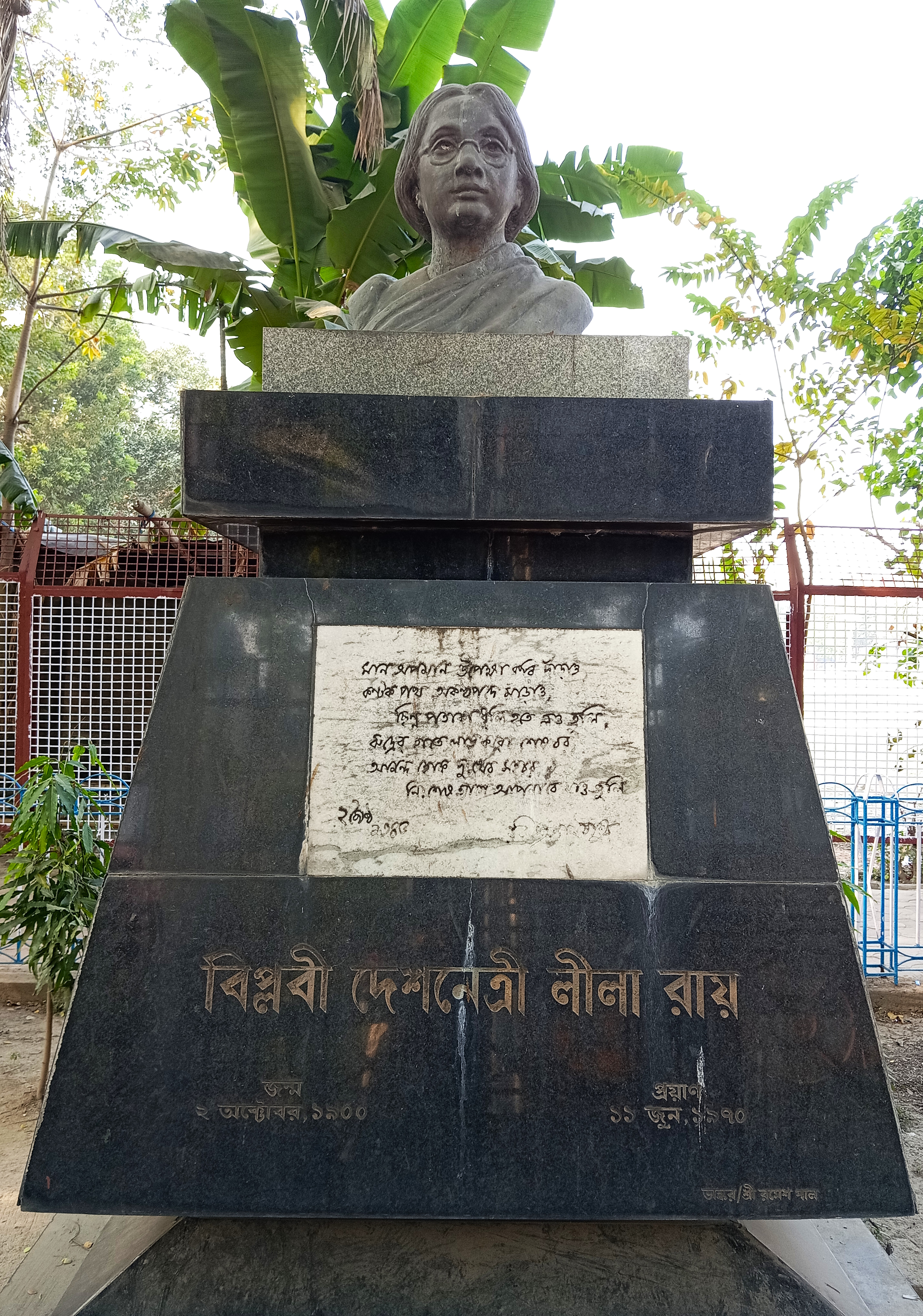
Bust of Leela Roy, Deshapriya Park, Kolkata, West Bengal, India

In 1960 she became the chairwoman of the new party formed with the merger of the Forward Bloc (Subhasist) and the Praja Socialist Party but was disappointed with its working. After two years she retired from active politics.

Leela Roy's letters were recovered from the items of an ascetic named Bhagwanji, who died in Faizabad in 1985. The letters reveal that Leela Roy came in touch with Bhagwanji in 1962, at Neemsar, Uttar Pradesh. She stayed in touch with him till her death in 1970, and kept providing for him.

She died in June 1970, after a prolonged illness.

== Homage paid ==
On 22 December 2008, the Vice President, Shri. Mohammad Hamid Ansari, the Speaker, Lok Sabha, Shri Somnath Chatterjee, the Prime Minister, Manmohan Singh and the Leader of the Opposition in Lok Sabha, Shri L. K. Advani were present during the unveiling of Leela Roy's portrait in Central Hall of the Indian Parliament.

In March 2023, an examination hall of the arts faculty at Dhaka University was named Leela Nag Examination Hall after her.

== See also ==
- Pritilata Waddedar
