= Samar Guha =

Indian politician

- সমর গুহ
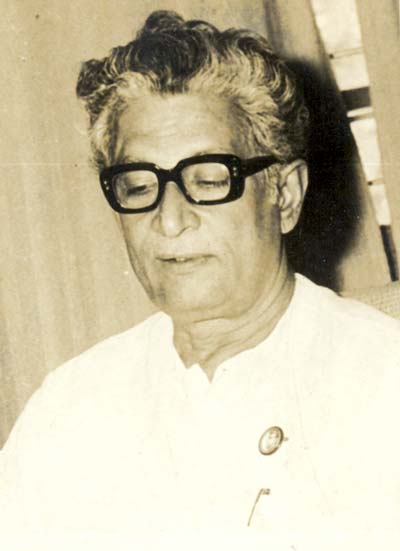

Member of Parliament, Lok Sabha
- In office 1967–1980
- Preceded by: Basanta Kumar Das
- Succeeded by: Sudhir Kumar Giri
- Constituency: Kanthi

Personal details
- Died: 17 June 2002 (aged 84) Calcutta, West Bengal, India
- Party: Praja Socialist Party; Janata Dal (Secular)
- Education: University of Calcutta
- Occupation: Politician, Academic, Author
- Known for: Indian independence movement activist, close associate of Subhas Chandra Bose

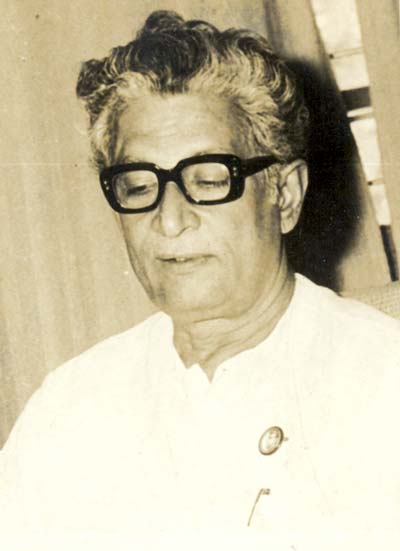
Professor Samar Guha

Samar Guha (Bengali: সমর গুহ) was a noted Indian politician, and an Indian independence movement activist. He was a close associate of Subhas Chandra Bose. He was also a well known academic, whose textbooks on chemistry are still widely used. In 1967, he was elected to the 4th Lok Sabha from Contai constituency in West Bengal as a Praja Socialist Party (PSP) candidate. He was re-elected to the Lok Sabha in 1971 and 1977 from the same constituency. He was a member of the Janata Dal (Secular) till his death. He died on 17 June 2002 at Calcutta.

== Connection with Bose Mystery ==
Samar Guha strongly believed that Netaji Subhas Chandra Bose was not killed on 18 August 1945 after the overloaded Japanese plane that Bose was flying in crashed in Taihoku Japanese-occupied Formosa (now Taiwan), As a parliamentarian, he was a devoted activist to make Government of India accept that Bose lived after 18 August 1945. He also made several efforts to make Government of India publish all secret files on Bose's death. Guha did not believe prior Shah Nawaz Committee's report on this. Even though the secret files were not published, Guha was one of the main vocal supporter of creating G D Khosla commission to re-investigate Bose's death in 1970. However, G D Khosla Commission also came up with the same conclusion as Shah Nawaz Committee even after Guha's effort to point out the inconsistency in the report produced by Khosla Commission. Primarily due to Guhas's effort, then Indian Prime Minister Morarji Desai announced that Khosla Commission's statement was not the final words on Bose's death. Soon after though, Guha's credibility took a serious blow when he produced a picture of Bose claiming it was a recent one that turned out to be fake.

Guha investigated all leads that he thought could help him to unravel any mystery behind Bose's death.

Netaji's picture was placed in Parliament because of the effort of Samar Guha in the 1970s.

== Literary works ==
- Netaji: Dead or Alive? (1978)
- The Mahatma and the Netaji (1986)
- Non-Muslims Behind the Curtain of East Pakistan (1965)

== Notes ==
Lok Sabha
Preceded by Basanta Kumar Das	Member of Parliament for Kanthi (earlier known as Contai Lok Sabha constituency); 1967–1980	Succeeded by Sudhir Kumar Giri
