= Political families of West Bengal =

Indian politicians family

The partial list of political families of West Bengal state of India.

== Bose Family ==
- Netaji Subhas Chandra Bose, freedom fighter, brother of Sarat Chandra Bose
- Sarat Chandra Bose, freedom fighter, brother of Netaji Subhas Chandra Bose, Bengal politician, member of Constituent Assembly of India
  - Amiya Nath Bose, son of Sarat Chandra Bose, MP from Forward Bloc
  - Dr Sisir Kumar Bose, son of Sarat Chandra Bose, MP from Forward Bloc
  - Subrata Bose, son of Sarat Chandra Bose, MP from All India Forward Bloc
  - Prof Krishna Bose, wife of Sisir Kumar Bose, MP from All India Trinamool Congress
    - Prof Sugata Bose, son of Sisir Kumar Bose, MP from All India Trinamool Congress
  - Amit Mitra, former Finance Minister in the Government of West Bengal (related from the maternal side)

== Khan Family ==
- A. B. A. Ghani Khan Choudhury, Union Minister of Railways in Third Indira Gandhi ministry and established the Kolkata Metro.
- Abu Hasem Khan Choudhury, MP from Indian National Congress..
  - Isha Khan Choudhury, former MLA from Indian National Congress.
- Abu Nasar Khan Choudhury, former MLA from Congress, member of All India Trinamool Congress.
- Rubi Noor, former MLA from Indian National Congress
  - Mausam Noor, former MP from Indian National Congress, member of All India Trinamool Congress.
  - Sonya Noor, American vascular surgeon

== Adhikari Family ==
- Sisir Adhikari, former MP from Bharatiya Janata Party
  - Suvendu Adhikari, sitting Chief Minister of West Bengal from Bharatiya Janata Party..
  - Dibyendu Adhikari, former MP from Bharatiya Janata Party.
  - Soumendu Adhikari, sitting MP from Bharatiya Janata Party

== Das Family ==
- 'Deshbandhu' Chittaranjan Das, was a Bengali freedom fighter, political activist and lawyer during the Indian Independence Movement and mentor of Subhas Chandra Bose.
  - Siddhartha Shankar Ray, grandson of Chittaranjan Das, former Chief Minister of West Bengal.
    - Maya Ray, Wife of Siddhartha Shankar Ray and former Member of Parliament in Lok Sabha

== A. Mukherjee Family ==
- Ashutosh Mukherjee, was an Indian mathematician, lawyer, jurist, judge, educator, and institution builder and father of Syama Prasad Mookerjee.
  - Syama Prasad Mookerjee Served as Minister for Industry and Supply under Prime Minister Jawaharlal Nehru's cabinet and latter With the help of the Rashtriya Swayamsevak Sangh, he founded the Bharatiya Jana Sangh in 1951.

== Dasmunsi Family ==
- Priya Ranjan Dasmunsi, former cabinet minister
- Deepa Dasmunsi, former Minister of State for Urban Development

== Konar Family ==
- Hare Krishna Konar, freedom fighter and politician, one of the founding members of the Communist Party of India (Marxist), and Minister of Land & Land Revenue.
- Benoy Krishna Konar, peasant leader, member of the West Bengal Legislative Assembly, and president of All India Kisan Sabha
- Maharani Konar, communist leader, member of the West Bengal Legislative Assembly, and one of the founding leaders of the All India Federation of Anganwadi Workers and Helpers (wife of Benoy Krishna Konar)

== Roy Family ==
- Tathagata Roy, Former governor of Meghalaya, Former president of West Bengal unit of BJP
- Sougata Roy, A veteran politician from West Bengal, senior leader of Trinamool Congress, Member of Parliament from Dum Dum and brother of Tathagata Roy.

== Naidu Family ==
- Sarojini Naidu, freedom fighter and poet
  - Padmaja Naidu, Former Governor of West Bengal, daughter of Sarojini Naidu

== P. Mukherjee Family ==
- Kamada Kinkar Mukherjee, member of the West Bengal Legislative Council from 1952 to 1964.
  - Pranab Mukherjee, Senior INC leader and former President of India and Pranab Mukherjee was a senior leader in the Indian National Congress and occupied several top ministerial portfolios in the Government of India.
    - Abhijit Mukherjee, Son of Pranab Mukherjee and former MLA & Member of Parliament from the Jangipur (Lok Sabha constituency) in West Bengal.
    - Sharmistha Mukherjee, member of Indian National Congress.

== Banerjee Family of Kalighat ==
- Mamata Banerjee, founder and president of All India Trinamool Congress, former Chief Minister of West Bengal.
  - Abhishek Banerjee, is the nephew of West Bengal Chief Minister Mamata Banerjee and Member of Parliament of Diamond Harbour, president of AITMCP, AITMYC and leader of All India Trinamool Congress in Lok Sabha.

== Bandyopadhyay family of North Kolkata ==
- Sudip Bandyopadhyay, former Minister of State in Government of India, Trinamool Congress MP from Kolkata Uttar Lok Sabha constituency
- Nayna Bandyopadhyay, wife of Sudip, Trinamool Congress MLA in West Bengal Legislative Assembly from Chowrangee Assembly constituency

== Mitra family ==
- Somen Mitra - former state Congress president, 5 time MLA & Trinamool Congress MP from Diamond Harbour
- Sikha Mitra - wife of Somen, former Trinamool Congress MLA from Sealdah Assembly constituency

== Singh Family ==
- Arjun Singh, former BJP MP from Barrackpore, former Trinamool Congress MLA of Bhatpara, former Chairman of Bhatpara Municipality,
  - Pawan Singh, son of Arjun, BJP MLA from Bhatpara
- Sunil Singh, MLA of Noapara, Chairman of Garulia Municipality
    - Umashankar Singh, senior leader and president of Bharatiya Janata party

== Ahmed Family ==
- Sultan Ahmed, MP and former Union Minister of State for Tourism Department, government of India
- Sajda Ahmed, wife of Sultan, MP from the Uluberia constituency

== Chatterjee Family ==
- Nirmal Chandra Chatterjee, MP from Hoogly
  - Somnath Chatterjee, Son of Nirmal, Speaker of the Lok Sabha and MP from Bolpur
