= Bibliography of Subhas Chandra Bose =

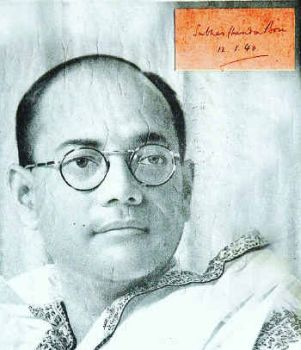
Subhas Chandra Bose, Indian freedom fighter

Subhas Chandra Bose (1897–1945) was an Indian politician and Indian freedom fighter. This is a list of some books written by or about him.

== Books written by Subhas Chandra Bose ==
Book	Publisher	Year	ISBN
Famous speeches and letters of Subhas Chandra Bose	Lion press	1946	
Ideas of a Nation	Penguin Books Limited	2010	ISBN 978-81-8475-201-4
Letters To Emilie Schenkl 1934-1942	Orient Blackswan	1994	ISBN 978-81-7824-102-9
On to Delhi: speeches and writings	Deshmukh	1946	N.A.
The Indian Struggle, 1920–1942 Part I (1920–1934)	Wishart & Co., London	1935	
The Indian Struggle, 1920–1942 Part II (1935–1942)	Wishart & Co., Italy	1942	
An Indian Pilgrim (An Unfinished Autobiography)	Thacker Spink & Co.	1948	ISBN 978-14-9731-210-4

== Books on Subhas Chandra Bose ==
=== A–R ===
Book	Author/Editor	Publisher	ISBN
Beacon Across Asia: Biography of Subhas Chandra Bose	Alexander Werth	Orient Blackswan	ISBN 978-81-250-1028-9
Democracy Indian Style: Subhas Chandra Bose and the Creation of India's Political Culture	Anton Pelinka, Renée Schell	Transaction Publishers	ISBN 978-0-7658-0186-9
His Majesty's Opponent	Sugata Bose	Harvard University Press	ISBN 978-0-674-04754-9
Laid to Rest: The Controversy Over Subhas Chandra Bose’s Death	Ashis Ray	Roli Books	ISBN 978-81-936-2603-0
Mystery of death of Subhash Chandra Bose	Tapan Banerjee	Rajat Publications	ISBN 978-81-7880-027-1
Netaji Subhas Chandra Bose	Sisir Kumar Bose	National Book Trust, India	ISBN 978-81-237-3316-6
Netaji Subhas Chandra Bose and Indian Freedom Struggle (Set in 2 Vols.)	Ratna Ghosh	Deep & Deep	ISBN 978-81-7629-843-8
Netaji Subhas Chandra Bose and Indian war of independence	Satis Chandra Maikap	Punascha	
Netaji Subhas Chandra Bose, from Kabul to Battle of Imphal	H. N. Pandit	Sterling Publishers	
Netaji Subhas Chandra Bose: his great struggle and martyrdom	Tatsuo Hayashida, Biswanath Chattopadhyay	Allied Publishers	
Netaji Subhash Chandra Bose: his life & work	Sopāna	Sole agents: Azad Bhandar	
Netaji Subhas Chandra Bose in South-East Asia and India's liberation war, 1943-45	Moti Lal Bhargava	Vishwavidya Publishers	
Netaji Subhas Chandra Bose: relevance to contemporary world	S. R. Chakravarti, Madan Chandra Paul	Har-Anand Publications	
Netaji Subhas Chandra Bose: the great war for political emancipation	Harihara Dāsa	National Pub. House	ISBN 978-81-86803-61-5
Netaji Subhash Chandra Bose	C. L. Sharma	Kunal Pustak Sansar	
Patriot, the unique Indian leader Netaji Subhas Chandra Bose: a new personalised biography	Mānavatī Āryyā	Lotus Press	ISBN 978-81-8382-108-7
Raj, Secrets, Revolution: A Life of Subhas Chandra Bose	Mihir Bose	Grice Chapman Publishing	ISBN 978-0-9545726-4-8

=== S ===
Book	Author/Editor	Publisher	ISBN
Subhas Chandra Bose: a biography	Gautam Chattopadhyaya	National Council of Educational Research and Training	
Subhas Chandra Bose: A Biography	Marshall J. Getz	McFarland	ISBN 978-0-7864-1265-5
Subhas Chandra Bose: a psychoanalytical study	Swagata Ghosh	Minerva Associates	ISBN 978-81-7715-015-5
Subhas Chandra Bose: Accelerator of India's Independence	Daya Mukherjee	Gyan Books	ISBN 978-81-212-0566-5
Subhas Chandra Bose and Middle Class Radicalism: A Study in Indian Nationalism, 1928-1940	Bidyut Chakrabarti	I.B.Tauris	ISBN 978-1-85043-149-7
Subhas Chandra Bose and the Indian national movement	Harihara Dāsa	Sterling Publishers	
Subhas Chandra Bose as I knew him	Kitty Kurti	Firma K. L. Mukhopadhyay	
Subhas Chandra Bose: facets of great patriot	Netaji Institute for Asian Studies	Netaji Institute for Asian Studies	
Subhas Chandra Bose, his contribution to Indian nationalism	V. S. Patil	Sterling Publishers	
Subhas Chandra Bose: his dream of free India	Raj Pruthi	Rajat Publications	ISBN 978-81-7880-163-6
Subhas Chandra Bose: his struggle for independence	O. P. Ralhan	Raj Publications	ISBN 978-81-86208-06-9
Subhas Chandra Bose in self-exile, his finest hour	Sudhindra Nath Bhattacharyya	Metropolitan Book Co.	
Subhas Chandra Bose, the Indian leftists and communists	Gautam Chattopadhyaya	People's Pub. House	
Subhas Chandra Bose: man, mission, and means	Subhash Chandra Chattopadhyay	Minerva Associates	
Subhas Chandra Bose: Netaji's passage to im[m]ortality	Subodh Markandeya	Arnold Publishers	ISBN 978-81-7031-241-3
Subhas Chandra Bose: political philosophy	Shridhar Charan Sahoo	APH	ISBN 978-81-7024-874-3
Subhas Chandra Bose: the British press, intelligence, and parliament	Nanda Mookerjee	Jayasree Prakashan	
Subhas Chandra Bose: The Man and His Times	Eric A. Vas	Lancer Publishers	ISBN 978-81-7062-243-7
Subhas Chandra Bose, the man and his vision	Muchkund Dubey	Har-Anand Publications	
Subhas Chandra Bose: the passionate patriot	Reeta Dutta Gupta	Rupa & Co.	
Subhas Chandra Bose: the undaunted	Darshan Singh	United Children's Movement	
Subhash Chandra Bose	Hugh Toye	Jaico Publishing House	ISBN 978-81-7224-401-9
Subhash Chandra Bose: a biography of his vision and ideas	Verinder Grover	Deep & Deep Publications	ISBN 978-81-7629-005-0

=== T ===
Book	Author/Editor	Publisher	ISBN
The Search for Netaji: New Findings	Purabi Roy	Peacock Publications	ISBN 978-81-8890-813-4

== See also ==
- Bibliography of Swami Vivekananda
- Chauhan, Abnish Singh (2006), Speeches of Swami Vivekananda and Subhash Chandra Bose: A Comparative Study, Prakash Book Depot, ISBN 9788179771495
