= Sarmila Bose =

Indian-American journalist and academic

- শর্মিলা বসু
- Born: 4 July 1959 (age 67); Boston, Massachusetts, U.S.

Academic background
- Education: Bryn Mawr College; Harvard Graduate School of Arts and Science; Harvard Kennedy School

Academic work
- Institutions: University of Oxford
- Notable works: Dead Reckoning: Memories of the 1971 Bangladesh War
- Website: https://sarmilabose.com/

Sarmila Bose is an Indian-American journalist, academic and lawyer. She has served as a senior research associate at the Centre for International Studies in the Department of Politics and International Relations at the University of Oxford. She is the author of Dead Reckoning: Memories of the 1971 Bangladesh War.

== Early life ==
Bose was born in Boston in 1959 and belongs to an ethnic Bengali family with extensive involvement in national politics in India. She is the grandniece of Indian nationalist Subhas Chandra Bose, granddaughter of nationalist Sarat Chandra Bose, and daughter of former Trinamool Congress parliamentarian Krishna Bose and paediatrician Sisir Kumar Bose.

== Education ==
Bose grew up in Calcutta, India, where she attended Modern High School for Girls.

She returned to the US for higher studies. She obtained a bachelor's degree in history from Bryn Mawr College, a master's degree in public administration from the Harvard Kennedy School, and a PhD in Political Economy and Government from Harvard University.

== Career ==
After her doctorate, she has held teaching and research positions at Harvard University, Warwick University, George Washington University, Tata Institute of Social Sciences, and Oxford University. She has also worked in journalism, writing in both Bengali and English.

In 2024, she advises at the Work Rights Centre in England.

== Bibliography ==
In her 2011 book, Dead Reckoning: Memories of the 1971 Bangladesh War, Bose claims that atrocities were committed by both sides in the 1971 Bangladesh War, but that memories of the atrocities had been "dominated by the narrative of the victorious side", pointing to Indian and Bangladeshi "myths" and "exaggerations" which were not historically or statistically plausible. While the book does not exonerate the West Pakistani forces, it claims that the army officers "turned out to be fine men doing their best to fight an unconventional war within the conventions of warfare". The book was criticized by Columbia University professor Naeem Mohaiemen in BBC and Economic & Political Weekly for ahistorical bias in sources. She later responded to three of her critics - Naeem Mohaiemen, Urvashi Butalia, and Srinath Raghavan.

She published Jyotibabu'r Pashchimbanga: ekti adhapataner adhyay the following year; the book looked at the effects of 25 years of Communist authority on education, health and industry in West Bengal.

She has also authored Money, Energy, and Welfare: the state and the household in India's rural electrification policy, published by Oxford University Press in 1993.

In 2021, she published a novella entitled Under Such a Sheltering Sky.

== Personal life ==
Bose has trained in Indian music and has performed in Calcutta.

Bose has two brothers. Sumantra Bose teaches at the London School of Economics, while her brother Sugata Bose was a member of the Indian Parliament from 2014 to 2019.
