= Mahila Rashtriya Sangha =

Defunct Political organisation

The Mahila Rashtriya Sangha (MRS, and also known as the Mahila Rashtriya Sangh) was the first organisation established in India with the aim of engaging women in political activism. It was formed in Bengal Presidency, British India, in 1928 by Latika Ghosh and Prabhavati Bose upon the instigation of Netaji Subhas Chandra Bose, a prominent Indian nationalist leader. Believing that improvement of the status of women and achievement of self-governance for India were inseparable aims, the MRS was an empowerment institution body that placed much emphasis on education as a means to achieve its goal.

The name translates as the Women's Political Association.

== Background ==
Latika Bose (née Ghosh), a niece of Aurobindo Ghose, had impressed Subhas Chandra Bose with her marshalling of a women's protest against the Simon Commission, following which the latter asked her to organise the MRS in 1928. Latika, who was a teacher educated at the University of Oxford and a supporter of Gandhi's satyagraha, recruited and led around 300 women from colleges and academic departments as part of the protest by the Bengal Volunteers at the 1928 session of the Indian National Congress. She baulked at Subhas's command that all involved in this event should wear military uniform, deciding instead that the women would wear red-bordered dark green saris and white blouses. This and other decisions, such as ensuring that the women did not stay in the protesters' camp overnight, together with a threat to withdraw their aid in matters such as selling tickets and supplying tea, ensured that she overcame the opposition of Sarat Bose, who had been concerned that the presence of women might offend conservative supporters of Congress.

== Formation and aims ==
Latika Bose agreed to form the MRS only after some thought because she knew that this would involve her having a high-profile connection to the Indian National Congress and thus would pit her against the British Raj authorities and prevent her from being accepted for employment by the Raj Educational Service. Despite the opinion of Subhas, Latika selected his mother, Prabhabati Bose, to be the first president and Latika's sister-in-law, Bivabati, became the first vice-president. Subhas had wanted Basanti Devi to be president but Latika considered her to be too distant for most Bengali women because of the extent to which Devi had been westernised, and she also appreciated that having the mother of the most prominent Bengali nationalist as an office-holder would appeal to potential supporters. Latika Bose herself took the role of secretary.

The MRS, which was founded in Chittagong, Bengal Presidency, saw their aim of improvements in the status of women and the achievement of swaraj (self-governance) as being mutually dependent. Education of women was a key to this and the MRS involved ten existing local educational groups from the outset. According to historian Geraldine Forbes, MRS leaders "argued the nation could never be free unless women's lives improved and improving women's lives depended on freedom from foreign domination". Latika Bose appealed for women to see the similarities of the women's struggle in the battles waged between the devas and asuras of Hindu mythology, and in the self-sacrifices of Rajput queens who had surrendered their male relatives to battle before preparing to die themselves in acts of jauhar (self-immolation).

Recruits came initially from the families of existing INC members because without their approval the women would not have been allowed to participate. The members were taught about independence and also received instruction in literacy, first aid, motherhood, and self-defence.
