= Bivabati Bose =

Indian social activist and wife of Sarat Chandra Bose

- বিভাবতী বোস
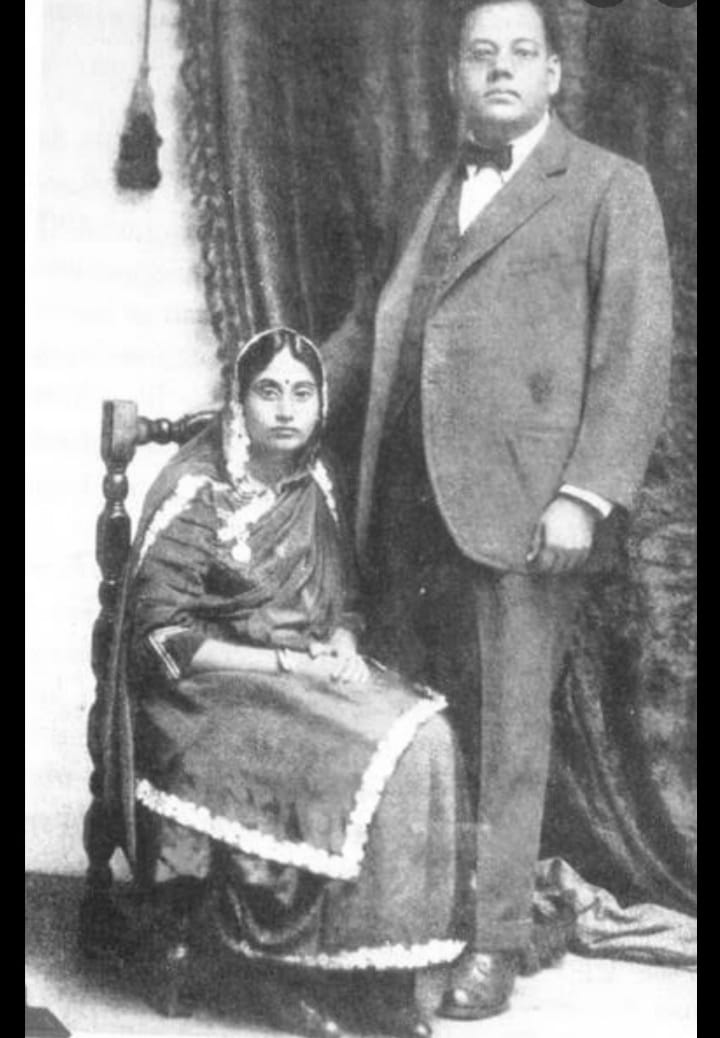
- Bivabati Bose (seated) with Sarat Bose
- Born: 1896
- Died: June 26, 1954 (aged 57–58); Kolkata
- Other names: Bibhabati Bose
- Spouse: Sarat Chandra Bose

Bivabati Bose (née De; c. 1896 – 1954) was a Gandhian social activist and a revolutionary of the Indian independence movement. She was married to Sarat Chandra Bose, an Indian nationalist leader and barrister, and played significant role in supporting nationalist activities and political engagements of her husband and her brother-in-law, Subhas Chandra Bose.

== Early life and marriage ==
Bivabati De was born in Calcutta (now Kolkata) in 1896 to Akshay Kumar Dey Biswas and Subala Dey, a prominent family in North Calcutta. At the age of thirteen in 1909, Bivabati married Sarat Chandra Bose, who was then a budding barrister and later became a prominent figure in the Indian National Congress and the independence movement. Although she had no formal education, she could read and write Bengali, and late studied English with Sarat. Together, they established the Bose family residence at 1 Woodburn Park in Calcutta, which became a focal point for political discussions and activities related to the freedom struggle.

== Role during the Independence Movement ==
Bivabati Bose managed the large joint family household, providing stability and support amidst the turbulent political careers of Sarat Chandra and Subhas Chandra Bose. Sarat Bose faced repeated arrests and detentions by the British authorities, including periods of imprisonment in the 1930s and internment during World War II (1941–1945). During these times, Bivabati maintained the house as a safe haven and meeting place for nationalists. She was known for her fortitude and resilience in managing the family's resources and raising their children during prolonged periods of her husband's absence.

She shared a close relationship with her brother-in-law, Subhas Chandra Bose. The family home at Woodburn Park was where Netaji was under house arrest before his escape in January 1941, an event planned within the household with the involvement of family members, including Bivabati's son, Sisir Kumar Bose.

== Family ==
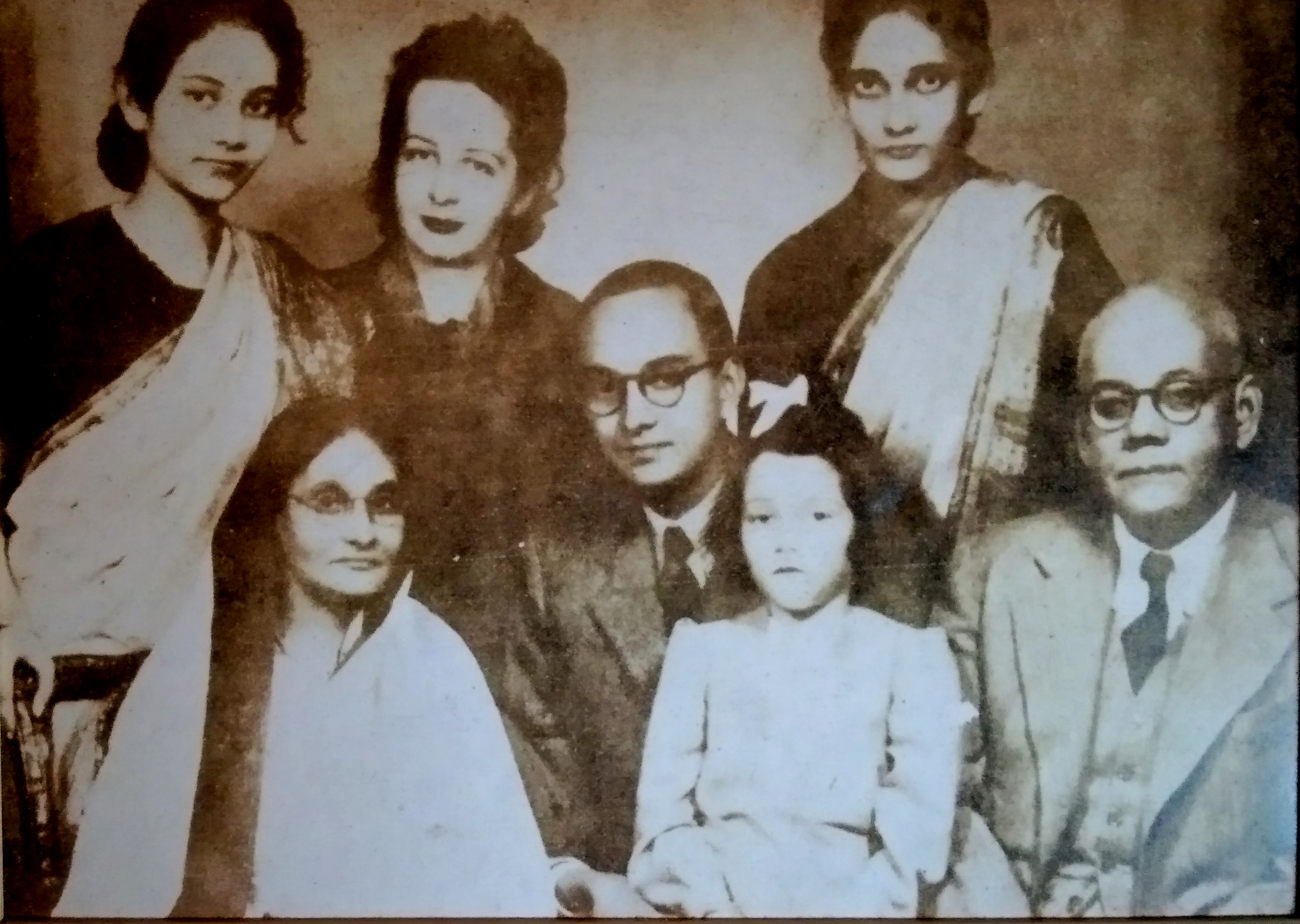
Bivabati Bose (seated, from left), Sisir Kumar, Anita and Sarat Chandra with standing Roma Emilie and Chitra in Vienna, November 1948

Bivabati and Sarat Chandra Bose had eight children who survived to adulthood:

- Asoke Nath Bose (1915–1994) - Chemical Engineer
- Amiya Nath Bose (1915–1996) - Barrister, Member of Parliament
- Sisir Kumar Bose (1920–2000) - Pediatrician, Member of Legislative Assembly, Founder Director of Netaji Research Bureau
- Subrata Bose (1932–2016) - Electrical Engineer, Member of Parliament
- Mira Roy (b. 1911/12)
- Gita Biswas (née Bose)
- Roma Ray Choudhury (née Bose)
- Chitra Ghosh (1930–2021) - Political Scientist, Professor
- Shanti Bose (died young)

== Later life and legacy ==
After India's independence and the death of Sarat Chandra Bose in 1950, she became directly involved in politics. She contested and won the vacant South Calcutta Assembly seat as a United Left Front candidate. She supported the establishment and activities of the Netaji Research Bureau, founded by her son Sisir Kumar Bose in 1957 at the family home. After prolonged illness, Bose died in her family home in Kolkata on 26 June 1954.

Letters written by Sarat Chandra Bose and Subhas Chandra Bose to Bivabati have been included in many publications. In 2009, her daughter Chitra Ghosh published a memoir titled Mother of My Heart: the Story of Bivabati Bose on the life of her mother.
