= Basanti Devi =

Indian politician

- Born: 23 March 1880; Calcutta, Bengal, British India
- Died: 7 May 1974 (aged 94); Calcutta, West Bengal, India
- Known for: Independence activist
- Political party: Indian National Congress
- Movement: Indian independence movement
- Spouse: Chittaranjan Das
- Awards: Padma Vibhushan (1973)

Basanti Devi (23 March 1880 – 7 May 1974), also known as Basanti Haldar or Basanti Devi Haldar, was an Indian independence activist during the British rule in India. She was the wife of freedom fighter Chittaranjan Das. After Das' arrest in 1921 and death in 1925, she took an active part in various political and social movements and continued with social work post-independence. She was awarded the Padma Vibhushan in 1973.

== Life and activities ==
Basanti Devi was born on 23 March 1880 to Swarnamayee Devi and her husband Baradanath Haldar, the diwan of a large zamindary in Assam during the British colonial rule. Basanti studied at the Loreto House, Kolkata, where she met and married Chittaranjan Das at the age of seventeen. The two had three children born between 1898 and 1901.

Following her husband, Basanti Devi took part in various movements like the Civil disobedience movement and the Khilafat Movement and also participated in the Nagpur session of the Indian National Congress in 1920. The following year, she joined Das' sisters Urmila Devi and Sunita Devi to establish the "Nari Karma Mandir", a training center for women activists. In 1920–21, she was instrumental in collecting gold ornaments and 2000 gold coins from Jalpaiguri towards the Tilak Swaraj Fund.

During the non-cooperation movement in 1921, the Indian National Congress called for strikes and a ban on foreign goods. In Kolkata, small groups of five volunteers were employed to sell khadi, hand spun clothes, on the streets of Kolkata. Das, who was the leading figure of the local movement, decided to make his wife Basanti Devi lead one such group. Devi went on the street despite warnings from Subhash Chandra Bose that it would provoke the British to arrest her. Although she was released by midnight, her arrest provided impetus to widespread agitation. Two prisons in Kolkata were filled with revolutionary volunteers and detention camps were hastily constructed to detain more suspects. On 10 December 1921, police arrested Das and Bose.

After Das' arrest, Basanti Devi took charge of his weekly publication Bangalar Katha (The Story of Bengal). She was the president of Bengal Provincial Congress in 1921–22. Presiding over the Bengal Provincial Conference at Chittagong in 1922, she encouraged grassroots agitation. Travelling around India, she supported cultural development of arts in order to oppose colonialism.

As Das was the political mentor of Subhash Chandra Bose, Bose had great regard for Basanti Devi. After Das's death in 1925, Bose is reported to have discussed his personal and political doubts with Devi. Bose's fraternal niece-in-law Krishna Bose characterized Basanti Devi as his "adopted mother" and one of the four important women in his life, the other three being his mother Prabhabati, his sister-in-law Bibhabati (wife of Sarat Chandra Bose) and his wife Emilie Schenkl.

Like her husband, Basanti Devi too was sympathetic towards the revolutionary activists in the Indian independence movement. In 1928, Indian freedom fighter Lala Lajpat Rai died days after being injured by the police in a baton charge against his peaceful protest march. Following this, Basanti Devi exhorted the Indian youth to avenge Lajpat Rai's death.

After India's independence in 1947, Basanti Devi continued with social work. Basanti Devi College, the first women's college in Kolkata to have been funded by the government, was established in 1959 and named after her. In 1973, she was honoured with the Padma Vibhushan, India's second highest civilian award.
