= Sumantra Bose =

Indian political scientist at London School of Economics

Sumanta Bose
- Education: Amherst College (B.A.); Columbia University (MA, MPhil, PhD)
- Occupation: Political scientist
- Employer: Krea University
- Notable work: Kashmir: Roots of Conflict, Contested Lands
- Parent(s): Sisir Kumar Bose, Krishna Bose

Sumantra Bose is an Indian political scientist and professor of international and comparative politics at Krea University in Andhra Pradesh, India. Prior to that, he held a similar position at the London School of Economics for two decades. He specialises in the study of ethnic and national conflicts and their management, with a particular focus on the Indian subcontinent (especially Kashmir) and the former Yugoslavia (in particular Bosnia and Herzegovina).

== Personal life ==
Bose is the son of Sisir Kumar Bose a pediatrician and legislator, and Krishna Bose, professor, writer and legislator. He is a grandson of Indian freedom fighter Sarat Chandra Bose. His grand uncle is the Indian nationalist leader Shubhas Chandra Bose. Sugata Bose (Gardiner Professor of Oceanic History and Affairs at Harvard University) and Sarmila Bose (b. 1959) are his siblings.

== Education and Career ==
Bose was born in India and was educated in Indian schools. He went to the United States for further studies, graduating from Amherst College, Massachusetts, with a BA with highest honours in 1992. He followed it up with MA, M.Phil and Ph.D. (1998) degrees in political science at Columbia University, New York. His doctoral dissertation was titled "Democracy and National Self-Determination: Institutional Structure in South Asia, Southern Europe and Eastern Europe," and involved a comparative study of Kashmir, Sri Lanka, Spain and the former Yugoslavia.

In 1999, Bose joined the London School of Economics and Political Science, and was Professor of International and Comparative Politics.

== Publications ==
His publications include:

- States, Nations, Sovereignty: Sri Lanka, India and the Tamil Eelam Movement (Sage, 1994)
- The Challenge in Kashmir: Democracy, Self-Determination and a Just Peace (Sage, 1997)
- Bosnia after Dayton: Nationalist Partition and International Intervention (Oxford University Press, 2002)
- Kashmir: The Roots of Conflict, Paths to Peace (Harvard University Press, 2003)
- Contested Lands: War and Peace in Israel-Palestine, Kashmir, Bosnia, Cyprus and Sri Lanka (Harvard University Press, 2007)
- Transforming India: Challenges to the World's Largest Democracy (Harvard University Press, 2013)
- Secular States, Religious Politics: India, Turkey, and the Future of Secularism (Cambridge University Press, 2018)
- Kashmir at the Crossroads: Inside a 21st-Century Conflict (Yale University Press, 2021)

== Reception ==
Reviewing Kashmir: The Roots of Conflict, Paths to Peace (2003), Sumit Ganguly noted an uneven but well-documented, accurate and dispassionate analysis of the origins of insurgency and the sentiments that gave birth to the Kashmir dispute. He noted Bose to display a "supple understanding of the political eddies and currents" that swirled in the pre-independence Kashmir. Notwithstanding the praises, he criticized the works as "far too chatty and anecdotal" in light of his noncritical reproduction of vast amounts of claims and assertions from partisan Kashmiri folks without cross-vetting them for reliability. Ganguly also criticized his willingness to believe that Pakistan will be conducive enough to partaking in his proposed solution to the conflict, which called for an all-stakeholders-dialogue between from both sides of the border, joint-acceptance of the Line-of-Control and a bilateral-management of the original unified state pending a political devolution in the Indian state of Jammu and Kashmir. He concluded that Bose's notion of a military dominated state that had fostered unyielding public hostility towards India (esp. on the Kashmir issue) of being a viable and honest negotiating partner to be "chimerical".

Robert G. Wirsing reviewed Kashmir: Roots of Conflict, Paths to Peace to be a remarkably "illuminating, interesting and valuable study'' that prescribed "one of the most substantial and compellingly articulated" consociational solution to the Kashmir dispute despite neglecting the strategic dimension of the dispute and going soft on the roles of religious identity in the prolongation of the conflict.

Another review praised the book for its highly objective and well-researched scholarship and deemed it to be a major contribution to Kashmir studies which may provide a valuable tool in settling the dispute. Perry Anderson, in his essay The Indian Ideology, observes that while Bose's book is descriptive, its suggested solution is simply in favour of the status quo. He regards Bose as the leader of Indian scholars in diaspora who have not used their right of free speech any better than their counterparts in India.

A reviewer remarked that whilst Transforming India: Challenges to the World’s Largest Democracy was a "stimulating and distinctive addition to the wave of publications about the 'new India'" it paid too little attention to political economy and fell short of other masterpieces in the field of Indian contemporary history or political science. Norio Kondo, reviewing the same book agreed with the broader sentiments but disagreed with Bose's observations as to the time span of the emergence of federalization. He held it to be the broad time span between 1967 and 1977 rather than to be 1989; a particular year as Bose had pinpointed. Kondo also felt that the book would have benefited from a greater emphasis on political economy and an analysis of the heterogeneous north-eastern-insurgencies which were missing. Notwithstanding these limitations; Kondo found the book to be valuable for understanding the gradual yet "long-term federalization of India into a decentralized union of autonomous states".
