= List of awards and honours received by Shinzo Abe =

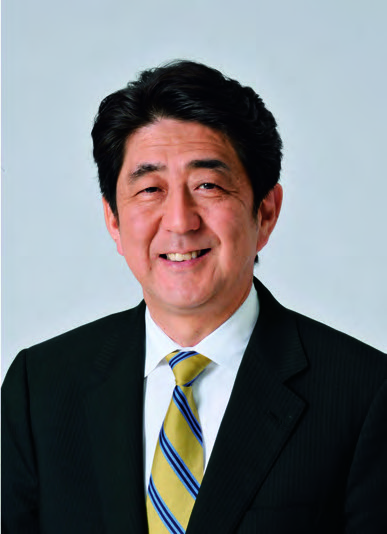
Shinzo Abe pictured in 2012.

Shinzo Abe served as the prime minister of Japan from 2006 to 2007 and again from 2012 to 2020. He received multiple honours and recognition from several countries.

== Domestic honors ==
- Supreme Order of the Chrysanthemum:
  - Collar of the Supreme Order of the Chrysanthemum (8 July 2022, posthumous)
  - Grand Cordon of the Supreme Order of the Chrysanthemum (8 July 2022, posthumous)
- Junior First Rank (8 July 2022, posthumous)

== Foreign honors ==
- Argentina: Grand Cross of the Order of the Liberator General San Martín (2016)
- Australia: Honorary Companion of the Order of Australia (31 August 2022, posthumous)
- Bahrain: Member 1st Class of the Order of Sheikh Isa bin Salman Al Khalifa (2013)
- Brazil: Grand Cross of the Order of the Southern Cross (2020)
- Greece: Grand Cross of the Order of Honour
- India: Padma Vibhushan (2021)
- Ivory Coast: Grand Cross of the Order of Ivory Merit (2014)
- Luxembourg: Grand Cross of the Order of the Oak Crown (2017)
- Netherlands: Knight Grand Cross of the Order of Orange-Nassau (2014)
- Paraguay: Grand Cross of the National Order of Merit (2018)
- Philippines: Grand Collar (Raja) of the Order of Sikatuna (3 June 2015)
- Saudi Arabia: Member 1st Class of the Order of Abdulaziz Al Saud (2007)
- Serbia: Member 2nd Class of the Order of the Republic of Serbia (2022)
- Spain: Knight Grand Cross of the Order of Isabella the Catholic (2017)
- Taiwan: Special Grand Cordon of the Order of Propitious Clouds (26 January 2023, posthumous)
- Turkmenistan: Jubilee Medal "25 years of Neutrality of Turkmenistan" (2020)
- United States: Chief Commander of the Legion of Merit (2020)
- Uruguay: Grand Officer of the Medal of the Oriental Republic of Uruguay (2018)

== Other honors ==
- International Olympic Committee: Gold Olympic Order (2020)

== Awards ==
- 2013 Foreign Policy Top 100 Global Thinkers, 2013. (United States)
- Herman Kahn Award, September 2013. (United States)
- The Straits Times Asian of the Year award, December 2013. (Singapore)
- Time 100 in 2014, April 2014. (United States)
- Time 100 in 2018, 2018. (United States)
- Boston Global Forum's World Leader in Cybersecurity Award, December 2015. (United States)
- 2021 World Statesman Award, March 2021. (United States)
- Keizaikai Award, January 2021. (Japan)
- Netaji Award 2022 by Netaji Research Bureau, January 2022. (India)

== Honorary doctorates ==
- Rangsit University, March 2013. (Thailand)
- Jawaharlal Nehru University, December 2015. (India)
- Turkmen State University, October 2015. (Turkmenistan)
- International Islamic University Malaysia, March 2022. (Malaysia)
