= Dead Reckoning: Memories of the 1971 Bangladesh War =

Book authored by Sarmila Bose

- Author: Sarmila Bose
- Language: English
- Genre: History
- Publisher: C. Hurst & Co.
- Publication date: 1 April, 2011
- Publication place: United States
- Media type: Print (hardback and paperback)
- Pages: 288
- ISBN: 978-1-84904-049-5

Dead Reckoning: Memories of the 1971 Bangladesh War is a controversial book on the Bangladesh Liberation War written by Sarmila Bose.

The book has been accused of flawed and biased methodology, historical negationism and downplaying genocide. Bose responded to Naeem Mohaiemen and others in The Economic and Political Weekly. She maintains that her research is unbiased.

== Overview ==
Bose aims for a revisionist reconstruction of the Bangladesh Liberation War in a chronological fashion using material evidence as well as public memory. This was to counter the prevailing multitude of poor and partisan scholarship on the issue, and Bose claimed that hers will be a unique work for years.

She notes the war to have had its origins in a xenophobic and communal expressions of Bengali nationalism. Military operations by Pakistani Army were mostly political reprisals and started in response to provocations by Mujib's movement which engaged in violence despite Yahya Khan's efforts to restore democracy. In the process, Bose also seeks to prove that the death-count portrayed by Bangladesh is often unreliable and aimed at distorting the truth about the nature and number of war-crimes.

== Reception ==
Martin Woollacott, the foreign correspondent of The Guardian, found it to be a long-overdue study which exonerated the Pakistani Government of planning to rule Bangladesh (East Pakistan) by force and stood to provoke "fresh research and fresh thinking".

Arnold Zeitlin, a journalist who had covered the '71 war, argued the monograph to be a "distortion of history" that carried the author's prejudices and had an idiosyncratic emphasis upon getting an accurate number of casualties, whilst refusing to tackle the underlying themes and issues surrounding the event.

Atul Mishra, an assistant professor in international relations at the Central University of Gujarat, reviewing for Contemporary South Asia, found the work to be "soundly conceptualized and professional", and an ideal read for doctoral students.

The book was subject to positive reception in Pakistan.

Chaity Das, reviewing over Journal of South Asian Development, found the book to be an exercise in "glossy revisionism"; failing to see beyond the number of casualties, Bose engaged in an opportunistic and inconsistent pitting of memory against memory to discredit the narratives of victims and exonerate the Pakistan Army.

Srinath Raghavan, a historian of contemporary history, reviewing for The Indian Express characterized Bose's work to be a "disturbing misrepresentation of the 1971 war" — "it [was] impossible to review the entire catalogue of evasions, obfuscations, omissions and methodological errors".

Gita Sahgal, writing for The Daily Star, expressed similar concerns; lacking in any theoretical or political framework and engaging in a selective usage of sources, Bose only served to adulate the Pakistan Military. Several issues — Jamaat-e-Islami, Al-Badr etc. — that would have proved inconvenient for her central thesis, were skipped.

Jayanta Kumar Ray claims bias in Bose's extensive usage of pro-Pakistan sources and accuses her of getting "basic facts wrong" in counting of rapes.

Urvashi Butalia, a feminist historian of memory, reviewing for Tehelka, noted the work to be spoiled by her "hubris and irrational biases"; Bose exonerated Pakistani officers of mass-rape and wanton violence by taking their accounts as "straightforward" truth but labeled all Bangladeshi accounts as "claims".

Nirupama Subramanian, in a review for The Hindu, found the book to have created a moral equivalence between the oppressors and oppressed — her work had evident bias in the manner she conducted much rigorous interviews of relevant Bangladeshi figures than their Pakistani counterparts and deemed the ethnic attitude of Bengalis to lie at the root of all issues.

Nayanika Mookherjee, a social anthropologist studying memories of '71 wartime rapes, found the book to be methodologically inconsistent, informed by a disdain for Bangladeshi Self Determination — to Bose, Bangladeshis were guided by blind hate against the "fine men" of Pakistan army who had "no ethnic bias" and they either exhibited "bestial" violence or were "cowards". She also criticizes Bose for failing to cite post-nationalist scholarship in vernacular, which discussed the role of Bengali Muslims in killing Bihari/non-Bengali collaborators and communities.
