= Achyut Patwardhan =

Indian activist (1905–1992)

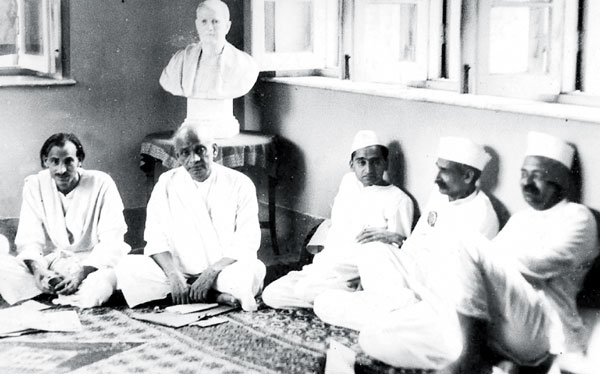
- AICC season in October 1937 at the Calcutta residence of the then Congress President Subhash Chandra Bose. Seated from Left to Right are J. B. Kripalani, Sardar Patel, Achyut Patwardhan, Narendra Deva & Gobind Ballabh Pant.
- Born: 5 February 1905; Ahmednagar, Bombay Presidency, British India
- Died: 5 August 1992; Varanasi, India
- Organisation(s): Indian National Congress, Socialist Party of India
- Movement: Indian Independence movement, Quit India movement

Achyut Patwardhan (5 February 1905 – 5 August 1992) was an Indian independence activist and political leader and founder of the Socialist Party of India. He was also a philosopher who believed fundamental change in society begins with man himself.

== Early life ==
Achyut's father, Hari Keshav Patwardhan, was a prosperous legal practitioner at Ahmednagar. He had six sons of whom Achyut was the second. When Achyut was a boy of four years, Sitaram Patwardhan, a retired Deputy Educational Inspector, adopted him. Sitaram died in 1917, leaving considerable property for Achyut.

After finishing his primary and secondary education at Ahmednagar, Achyut passed the B. A. and M. A. examination from the Central Hindu College of Benares. His subject was economics and he obtained a first class. Achyut's own and adoptive fathers were both Theosophists and, therefore, he was sent to the college founded by Dr. Annie Besant. He was in contact with Dr. G. S. Arundale, the Theosophist Principal of the college, Dr. Annie Besant and Professor Telang. Their influence made him studious, meditative and ascetic. It must also be the reason of his lifelong bachelorship.

== Social activities ==
After passing his M. A. he worked as Professor of Economics at the college till 1932. During this period he thrice visited England and other European countries and came in contact with Socialist leaders and scholars. He studied Communist and Socialist literature, resigned his Professorship and plunged in 1932 into Gandhiji's civil disobedience movement. He was imprisoned several times during the next ten years.

His aim in joining the Congress, like his associates Acharya Narendra Deva, Jayaprakash Narayan and others, was to turn the Congress to Socialism. In 1934, he and his associates in jail formed the Congress Socialistic Party with a view to working for socialistic objectives from within the Congress. Achyut was taken on the CongressWorking Committee by Jawaharlal Nehru in 1936, but he resigned in a few months and thereafter resisted Nehru's invitations to join it. From 1935 to 1941 he organised Shibirs (education camps for young men), to teach them Socialism and to prepare them for socialistic activities.

He took a prominent part in the Quit India movement which started in 1942. In 1945–46 he went underground, and evading arrest, he supported the movement of a parallel government mainly in the Satara district. The parallel government of Satara was a " Prati-Sarkar" which lasted for longest period of 44 months. It was called 'Patri Sarkar'by some people. 'Patri' was the name given to the punishments administered to the decoits, traitors and people who dared to obstruct the parallel government. The true and veteran leader of Prati Sarkar was Krantisinha Nana Patil, who was arrested and imprisoned 8 times from 1932 to 1942 by the British Government for his Satyagraha activities in Congress movement. Under his great and visionary leadership the parallel government was established and effectively run in 20 parts of Satara District (present Satara and Sangali districts). Nearly 500 villages were really "free" from British empire.The Parallel Government penetrated into the villages where the Government machinery broke down completely.Separate people's Justice courts were organised and so many cases of loans, aggression and rapes were solved by people's courts giving justice to poor farmers, farm labours and women of all castes at large. Strong Punishments to attempts of rape, excessive interest rates by money lenders, and the execution of power of Zamindars over poor farmers lead to the popularity of Prati-Sarkar in the minds of ordinary people. The British government had put a price of Rs 2,00,000 on his head.

Achyutrao personally served the activists in this movement by washing their clothes and cooking their food. After May 1946 when all activists of parallel government became visible before the public, he took part in public meetings with them.

Annual Sessions of the Congress Socialist Party were held from 1934 onwards. But it was found difficult for Achyut and his co-workers to promote Socialism from within the Congress. In 1947 they formed the Socialist Party of India, independently of the Congress. In 1950, Achyut retired from politics and worked again as Professor in the Central Hindu College till 1966. After that patios, he led an entirely secluded and retired life in Pune, not appearing in public at all, and not even responding to correspondence.

== Publications ==
- Patwardhan, Achyut (1971). Ideologies and the perspective of social change in India. Issue 1 of Balwantrai Mehta memorial lectures. University of Bombay. p. 42.
- Mehta, Asoka; Patwardhan, Achyut (1942). The communal triangle in India. Kitabistan. p. 263.

== External Sources ==
1. "I Am A Repentant Socialist"- Interview with Achyut Patwardhan, Freedom First, October-December 2002 Number 455. Pages 43-44
