= Janakinath Bose =

Indian lawyer

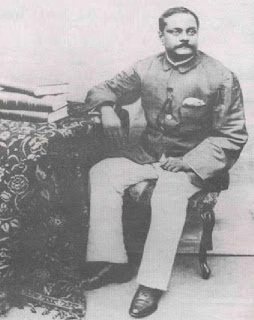
- Janakinath Bose, c. 1905
- Born: 28 May 1860; Kodalia, Bengal, British India (now Subhashgram, West Bengal, India)
- Died: 2 December 1934 (aged 74); Calcutta, Bengal, British India (now West Bengal, India)
- Occupation: Barrister
- Known for: Father of Netaji Subhas Chandra Bose
- Spouse: Prabhabati Bose
- Children: 14 children [Including 8 sons (Subhash Chandra Bose, Sarat Chandra Bose & others) and 6 daughters

Janakinath Bose (also Janaki Nath Bose; 28 May 1860 – 2 December 1934) was an Indian lawyer and advocate, who was the father of Indian independence leader Subhas Chandra Bose and barrister Sarat Chandra Bose.

== Early life ==
Bose was born in the village of Kodalia on 28 May 1860, fourth son of Haranath Bose, of the Kulin Kayastha Bose family of Mahinagar (the present-day South 24 Parganas district). Although the Bose family were traditionally adherents of Shaktism, Haranath Bose was a devout follower of Vaishnavism. The gate of the house still stands bearing this name. Although the Bose family of Mahinagar can traces its lineage back to Gopinath Bose who was given the title Purandar Khan by Sultan Hussain Shah, by the time of his birth it had been reduced to modest means. Janaki Nath passed the Entrance examination in December 1877 from Albert School, Kolkata.

== Education ==
He passed his matriculation examination from the Albert School and was subsequently educated at the Scottish Church College, and at the Ravenshaw College, from where he graduated. Subsequently, he studied law at the University of Calcutta. A schoolmate at this time was the legendary chemist-cum-industrialist Acharya Prafulla Chandra Ray, who as a Professor taught his sons at Presidency College. Janaki Nath attended St. Xavier's College Calcutta for six months and then joined the General Assembly Institution, now the Scottish Church College. He then moved with his elder half-brother Debendra Nath to Cuttack and joined the Ravenshaw College in August 1879. Passing the FA examination in first division and he earned a scholarship of Rs 20 per month, a princely sum in those days.

He continued his studies there for the B A degree in 1882. He passed the B. L. degree from the Metropolitan Institution in early 1884. During this time he came into close contact with prominent personalities of the Brahmo Samaj such as Brahmanand Keshav Chandra Sen, his brother Krishna Bihari Sen and Umesh Chandra Dutt. In between he served as a lecturer at Albert College in 1883, of which Krishna Behari Sen was then Rector. For about nine months in 1884 he was headmaster at Joynagar Institution.

== Career ==
During his stay in Calcutta, he came in contact with leaders of the Brahmo Samaj, and was deeply influenced by their vision. In 1885, he joined the bar in the court of Cuttack, where he practised, and went on to become an advocate. He was appointed Government Pleader in 1891. He was elected the first unofficial chairman of Cuttack Municipality in In 1901. He was elected a member of the Bengal Legislative Council in 1912 and received the title Rai Bahadur, which he gave up in protest in 1930.

His career as an advocate made him come in contact with various religious, and political personalities of the Indian Independence movement. He passed many of his ideals and values to his 9th son, Subhas, at a very young age.

== Personal life ==
Bose was the son of Haranath Bose and Kamini Bose. He was the brother of Jadu Nath Bose, Kedar Nath Bose, Debendra Nath Bose, Tara Prasanna Bose and Surya Prasanna Bose.

He was married to Prabhabati Dutt, who played a substantial role in the education of their eight sons and six daughters, including Sarat Chandra Bose and Subash Chandra Bose.
