= Rabindranath Datta =

Indian poet

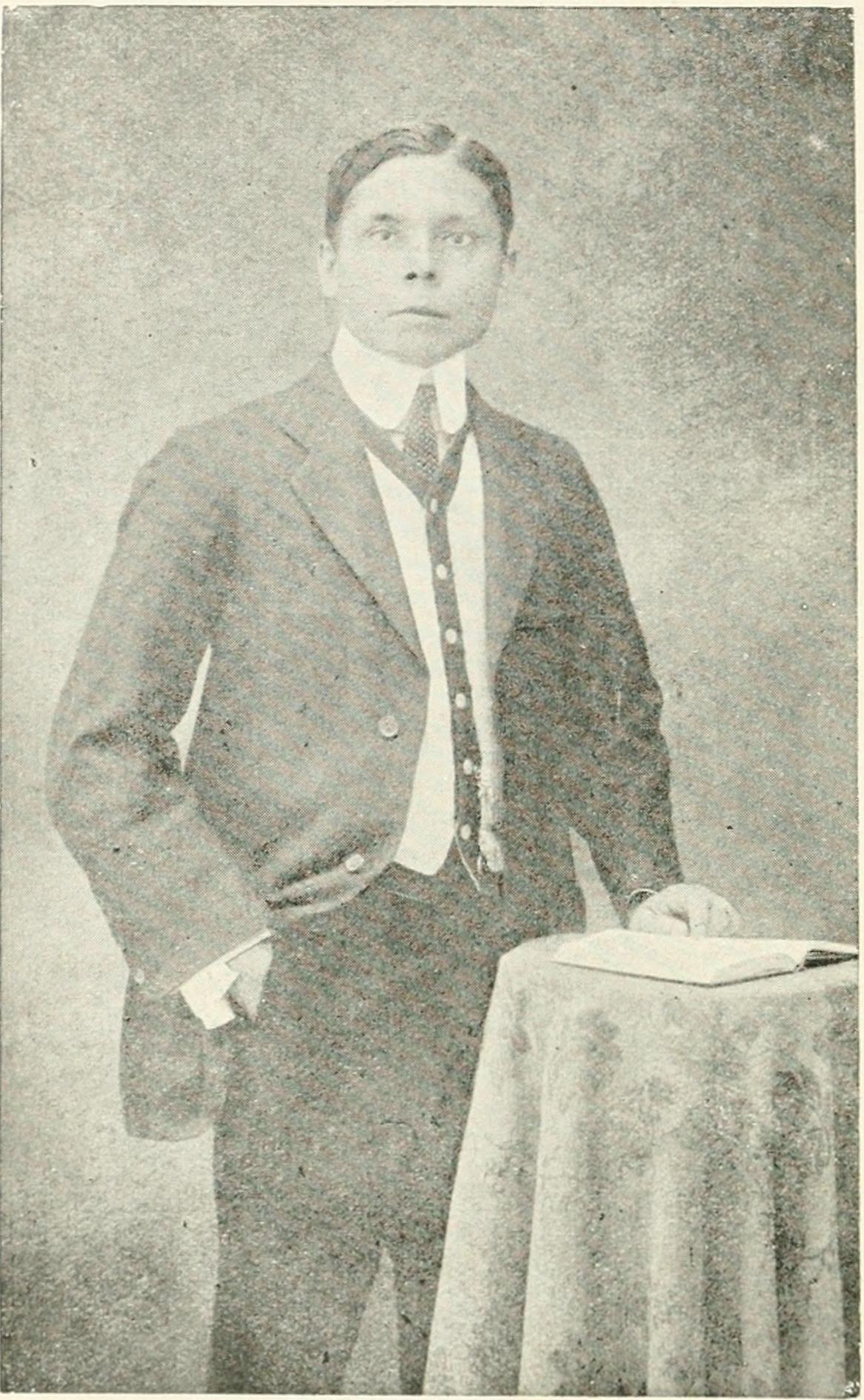
- Born: 1 October 1883; Kolkata
- Died: 1917 (aged 33–34); Kolkata
- Other names: Roby Datta, R. Dutta
- Occupations: Professor, Poet
- Known for: Poet
- Spouse: Emily Georgena Atkinson (m. 1913)
- Relatives: Prabhabati Bose (cousin); Subhas Chandra Bose (nephew)

Rabindranath Datta (also known by his pen name Roby Datta) was an Indo-Anglian writer and educator. He was born in a renowned Bengali family on 1 October 1883 in Sankar Ghosh Lane, Calcutta. His father was Gyanendra Nath Dutt, a member of the Hatkhola Dutt family.

He studied at Christ's, Camb. and obtained BA (Trip., 1906) and MA (Med. and Mod. Langs. Trip., 1910) degrees. He also obtained an MA (Sanskrit) from the University of Calcutta. He was called to the Bar (Gray's Inn), 27 January 1908 and he enrolled in the Calcutta High Court in 1909. However, he did not practice law. He taught English and Comparative Philology at the University of Calcutta till his death in 1917. He was a very popular teacher.

He married an accomplished English woman Emily Georgena Atkinson in 1913. Roby Datta with his wife Emily lived in his ancestral house on Kashinath Dutt Road, Baranagore (a suburb of Calcutta), India.

Datta contributed uniquely to early Indian writing in English, with notable texts including:

• Echoes from East and West (1909): A well-received early poetry and translation collection.

• Sakuntala and Her Keepsake rendered from the Sanskrit Play of Kalidasa (1915)

• Prosody & Rhetoric (1915)

• Stories in Blank Verse to which is added An Epic Fragment (1915)

• Poems, Pictures and Songs to which is prefixed The Philosophy of Art (1915)
