= Subodh Markandeya =

Indian lawyer

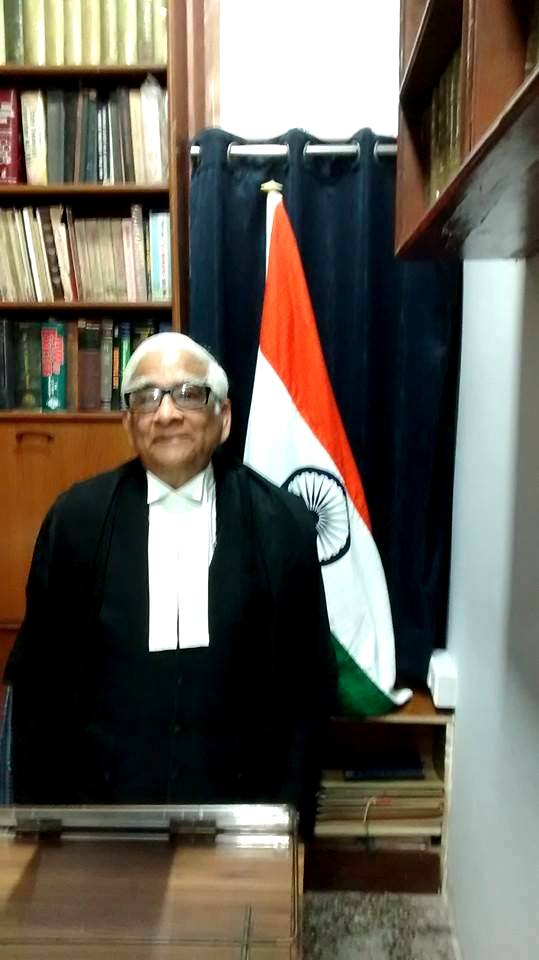

Personal details
- Born: June 18th 1936
- Occupation: Lawyer judicial activist
- Website: subodhmarkandeya.com

Subodh Markandeya is an Indian lawyer, author and judicial activist. He primarily practices at the Supreme Court of India. He has served as the standing counsel for Government of India, Life Insurance Corporation of India (LIC), State of Uttar Pradesh, Uttar Pradesh Financial Corporation (UPFC), Uttar Pradesh State Electricity Board (U.P.S.E.B.), Uttar Pradesh Jal Nigam and numerous developmental authorities.

He was appointed 'amicus curiae' (friend of the court) by the Supreme Court in the 'Tihar Jail Enquiry' (1982–85).

== Legal career ==
Markandeya apprenticed with, and was also a junior to Ramkrishen Rao Nimbalkar, a leading lawyer of the City Civil Court, Hyderabad, onetime president of its bar association and member of the first Bar Council of Andhra Pradesh, where he engaged in civil law practice.

In 1965, he got the opportunity to practice under Jagdish Swarup, legendary lawyer of Allahabad High Court, where he honed his skills in the civil, constitutional, regulatory and interpretation laws. He also acquired independent cases for the Supreme Court of India, particularly in labour and service laws. In 1968 he shifted to Supreme Court as a trainee Advocate-on-Record (AOR) under R. Vasudev Pillai. He was enrolled as AOR by the Supreme Court in 1970 and appeared in several 'cause célèbre' cases from all over India.

He was appointed standing counsel by the Central Government in 1977 and he appeared in cases of prime importance, including Minerva Mills vs. Union of India, Som Prakash Rekhi vs. UOI (3), and Sanjay Gandhi vs. Delhi Administration.

The Supreme Court appointed him amicus curiae in the "Tihar Jail Enquiry" Case, which spurred major jail reforms and protection of prisoners' human rights.

A petition was moved in the Supreme Court by Markandeya contending that the resignations submitted by MLAs on the issue of Telangana be deemed to have been accepted by the Andhra Pradesh Assembly Speaker. He said MLAs belonging to Telangana, irrespective of their political affiliations, submitted their resignations to the Speaker, who acknowledged the receipt of 139 letters.

During the Emergency, his joint efforts with R. P. Goel, [later Advocate General of Uttar Pradesh] brought succour and freedom to hundreds of detenues throughout India and particularly Uttar Pradesh. Markandeya was also appointed Counsel for the Allahabad High Court, State of Uttar Pradesh, its various Public Undertakings, Development Authorities, Universities and local bodies. He also appeared for a number of public sector undertakings like Life Insurance Corporation,

== Books written ==
On legal subjects –

- The Customs Act, 1962 (JAICO – 1975)
- The Foreign Exchange (Regulation) Act, 1973 (JAICO – 1977)
- The Imports & Exports Control Act, 1947 (N.M. Tripati – 1977)
- The Foreign Trade (Regulation & Development) Act, 1998 (Universal −1998)
- The Customs Act, 1962 (Universal - 2003)

On General topics:

- SUBHAS CHANDRA BOSE – Netaji's Passage to Immortality (Arnold – 1991 and 1997)

The British relentlessly pursued their policy of consolidating their hegemony. By attempting to destroy the traditional arts and crafts, industry and commerce besides the systems of education.Lord T.B Macaulay's educational policy gave rise to a new urban elite bemused by the British lifestyle and practices and employed by the British to man their administration.

The same year, ie,1897 on January 23, by a quirk of history, was born Subhas Chandra Bose, who was to shake the mighty British Empire to its foundations and help hasten its liquidation.Bose possessed a rare combination of qualities, viz., indomitable courage, utter disregard of danger, unflinching devotion to the cause of India's independence, selflessness and disdain of worldly pursuits traceable in his family background and upbringing.

- Subodh Markandeya, SUBHAS CHANDRA BOSE – Netaji's Passage to Immortality

== Legislations drafted ==
- State of Uttarakhand Act, 1996 (enacted by Indian Parliament as the Uttar Pradesh Re-organisation Act, 2000)
- Election Laws (Reforms) Act, 1997 (submitted to Law Commission of India)
- House of the People & State Assemblies (Special Provisions) Act, 1998
- U.P. Land Acquisition for Development Authorities (Special Provisions Act, 1999
- Uttaranchal Conservation of Environment and Preservation & Augmentation of Glacial and Forest Resources Act, 2007
