= Netaji Bhawan =

Historic building in India

Coordinates: 22°32′15.3″N 88°21′4.5″E

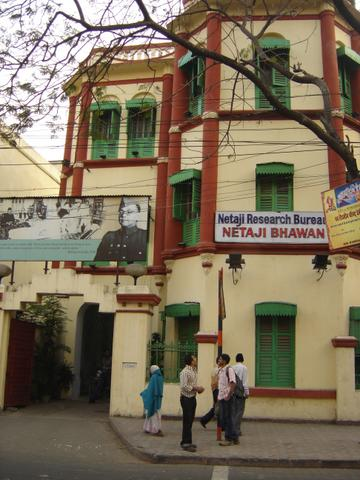
- Front view of Netaji Bhawan in Bhowanipore
- Location: Lala Lajpat Rai (Elgin) Sarani, Sreepally, Bhowanipore, Kolkata, India

Netaji Bhawan or Netaji Bhavan (Bengali: নেতাজি ভবন; lit. 'Netaji's Residence') is a heritage building in Kolkata, West Bengal, maintained as a memorial and research center to the life of the Indian nationalist "Netaji" Subhas Chandra Bose. It is currently the headquarters of Netaji Research Bureau.

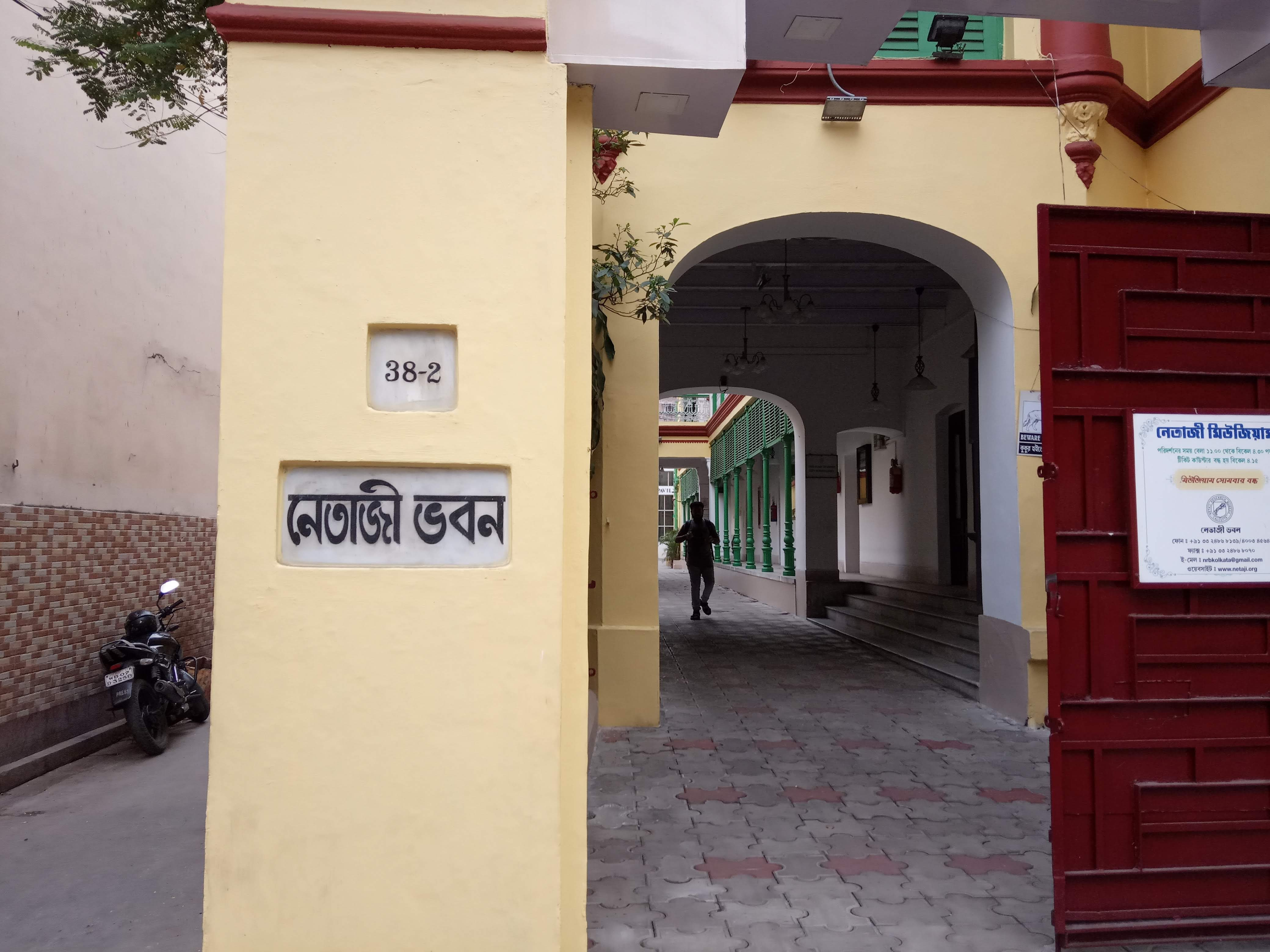
Entrance of Bhawan

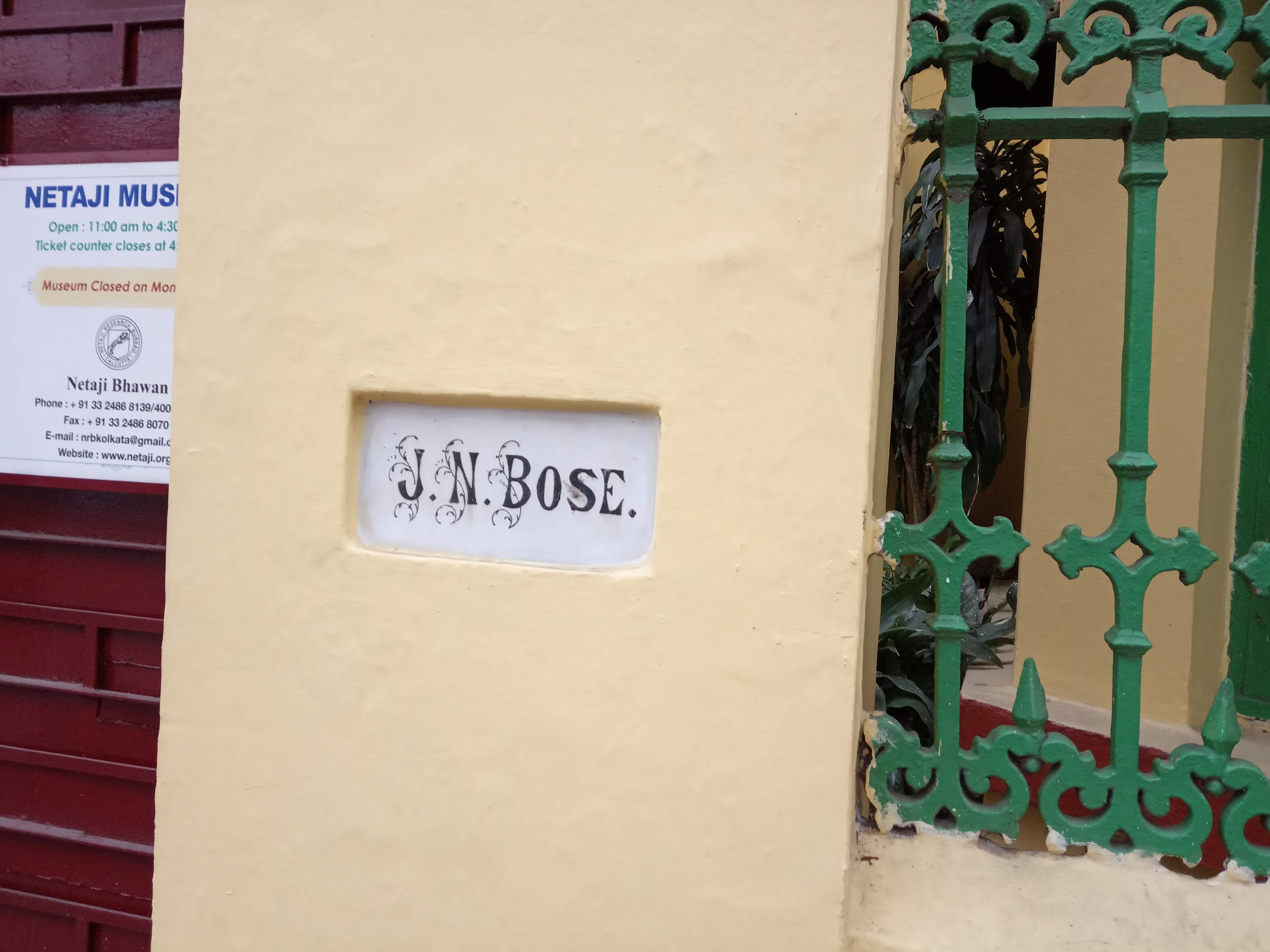
Marble plaque in the name of JN Bose (Janakinath Bose), father of Netaji Subhash Bose.

== History ==
The house, built by Bose's father in 1909, is owned and managed by the Netaji Research Bureau and includes a museum, archives and library. The Bureau is run by Sugata Bose and his mother, Krishna Bose. The building is on Lala Lajpat Rai Sarani in Kolkata.

Bose escaped from house arrest at Netaji Bhawan in 1941 and fled to Berlin. After that, he traveled to Japan-occupied Southeast Asia by submarine (German U-boat U-180 and Japanese submarine I-29), organized Indian National Army, and fought against British Raj with the Imperial Japanese Army.

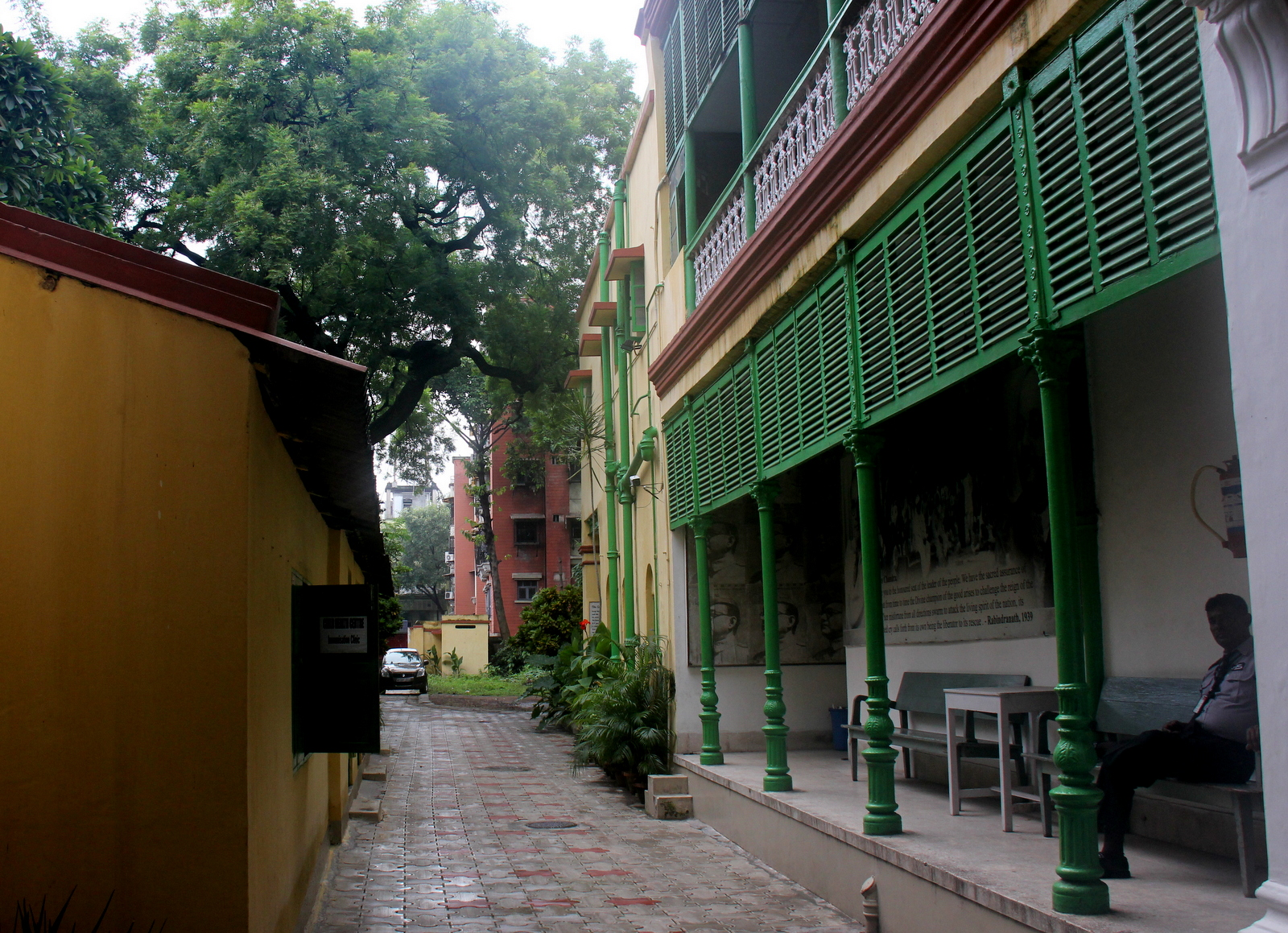
Netaji Bhawan

Relics of Bose's footprints are exhibited in the museum.

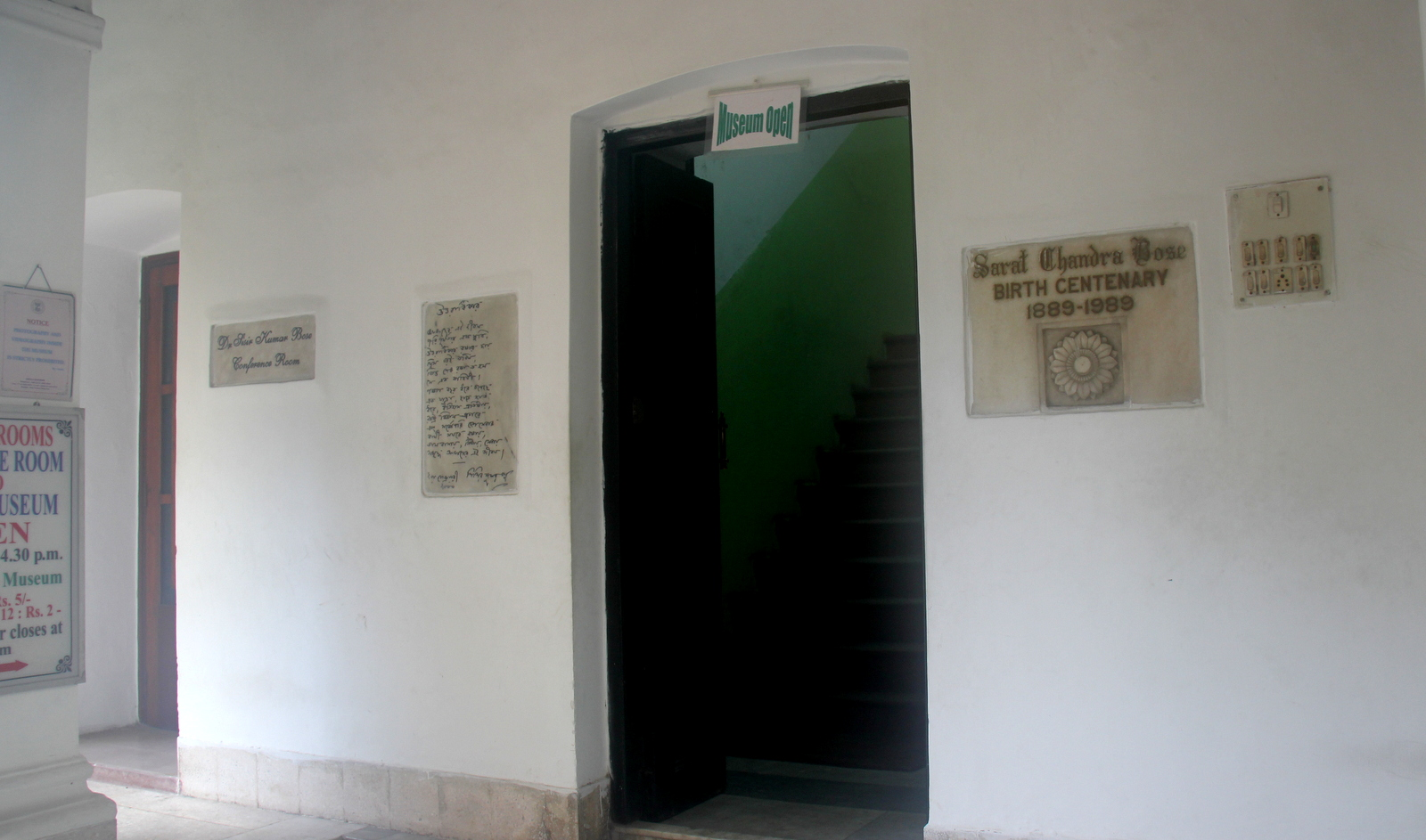
Netaji Bhawan

After the Second World War, Mohandas K. Gandhi and Jawaharlal Nehru visited Netaji Bhawan.

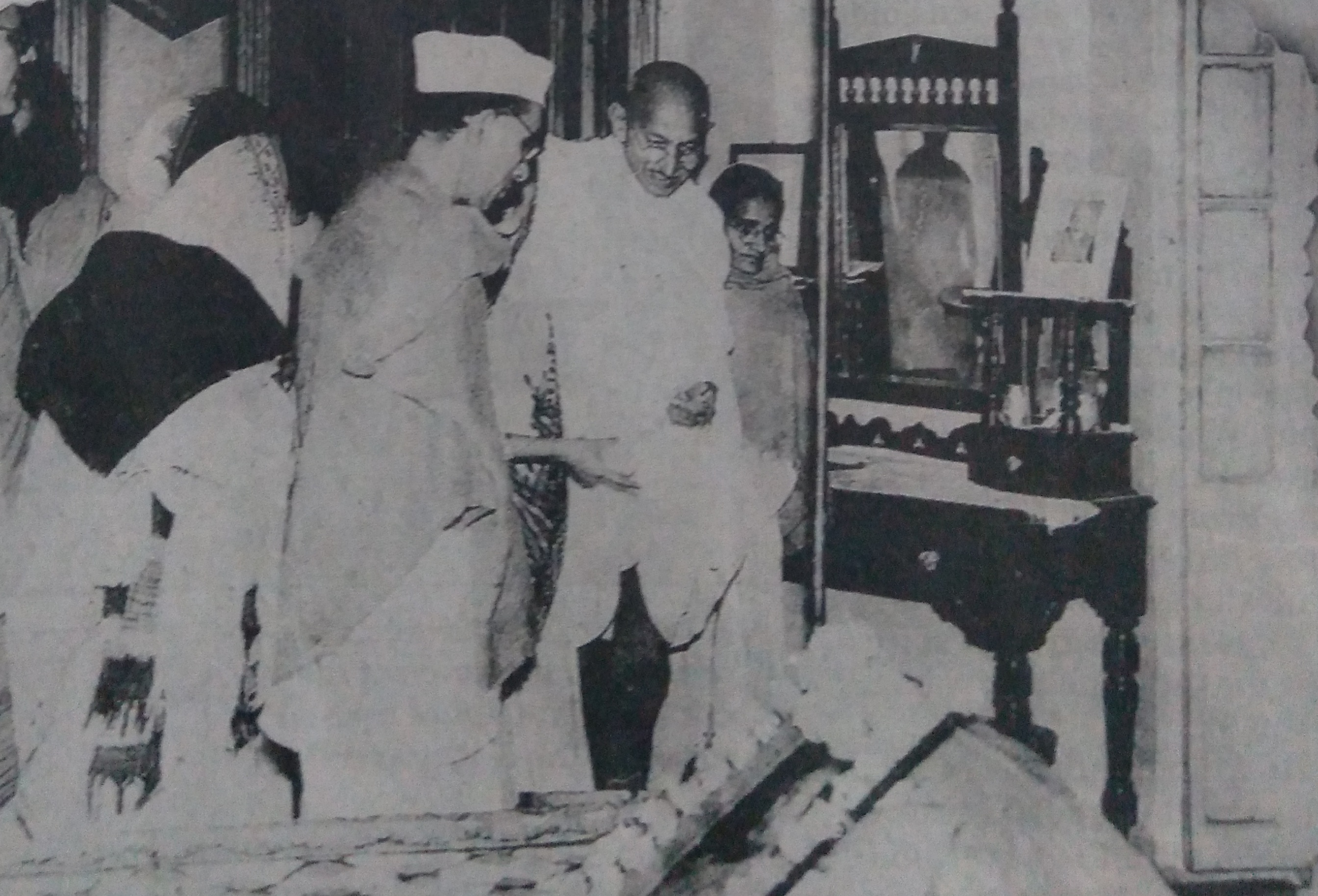
Mahatma Gandhi at Netaji Bhawan in 1945.

Recently, in 2007, Prime Minister of Japan Shinzō Abe visited the Netaji Bhawan.

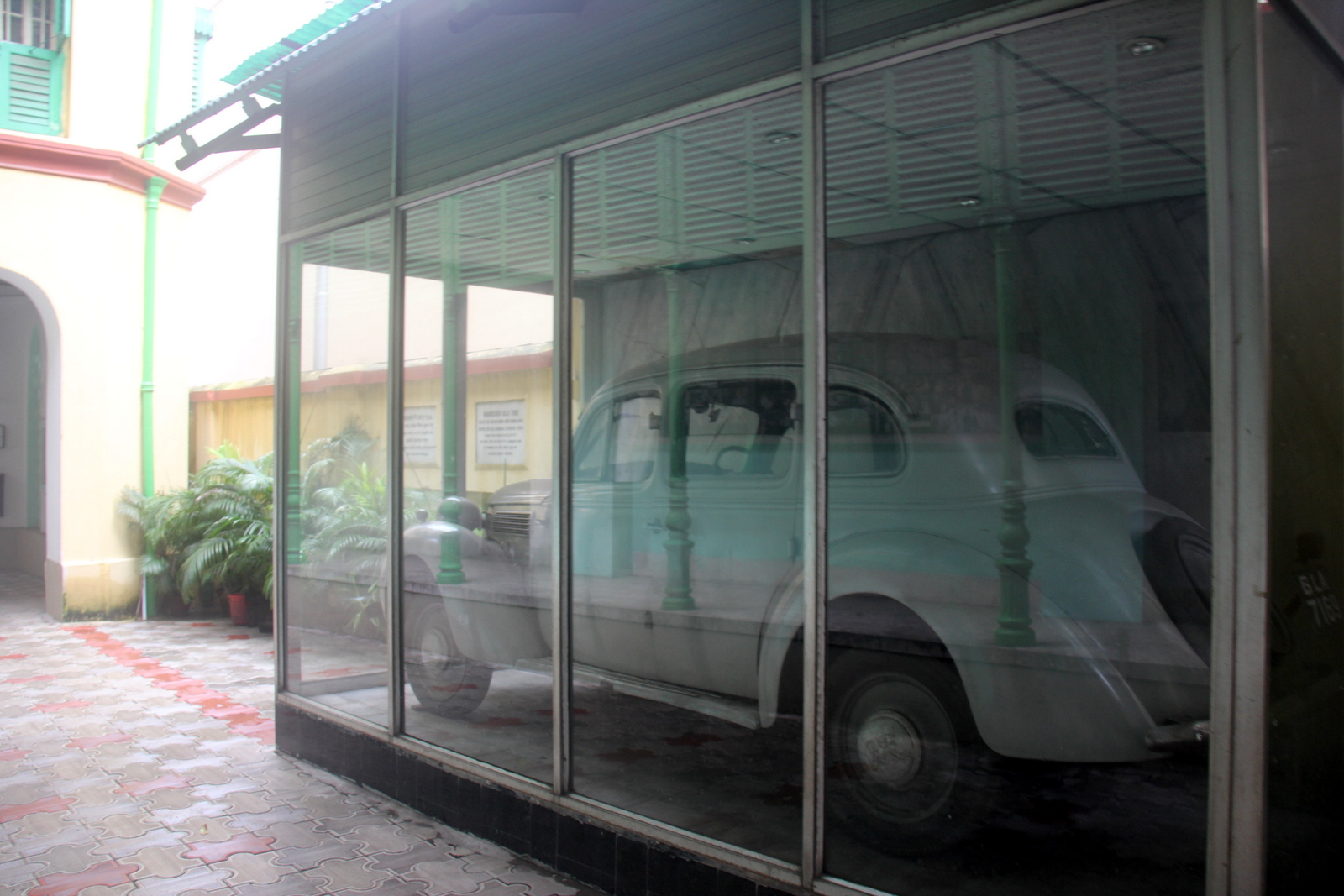
Netaji Bhawan

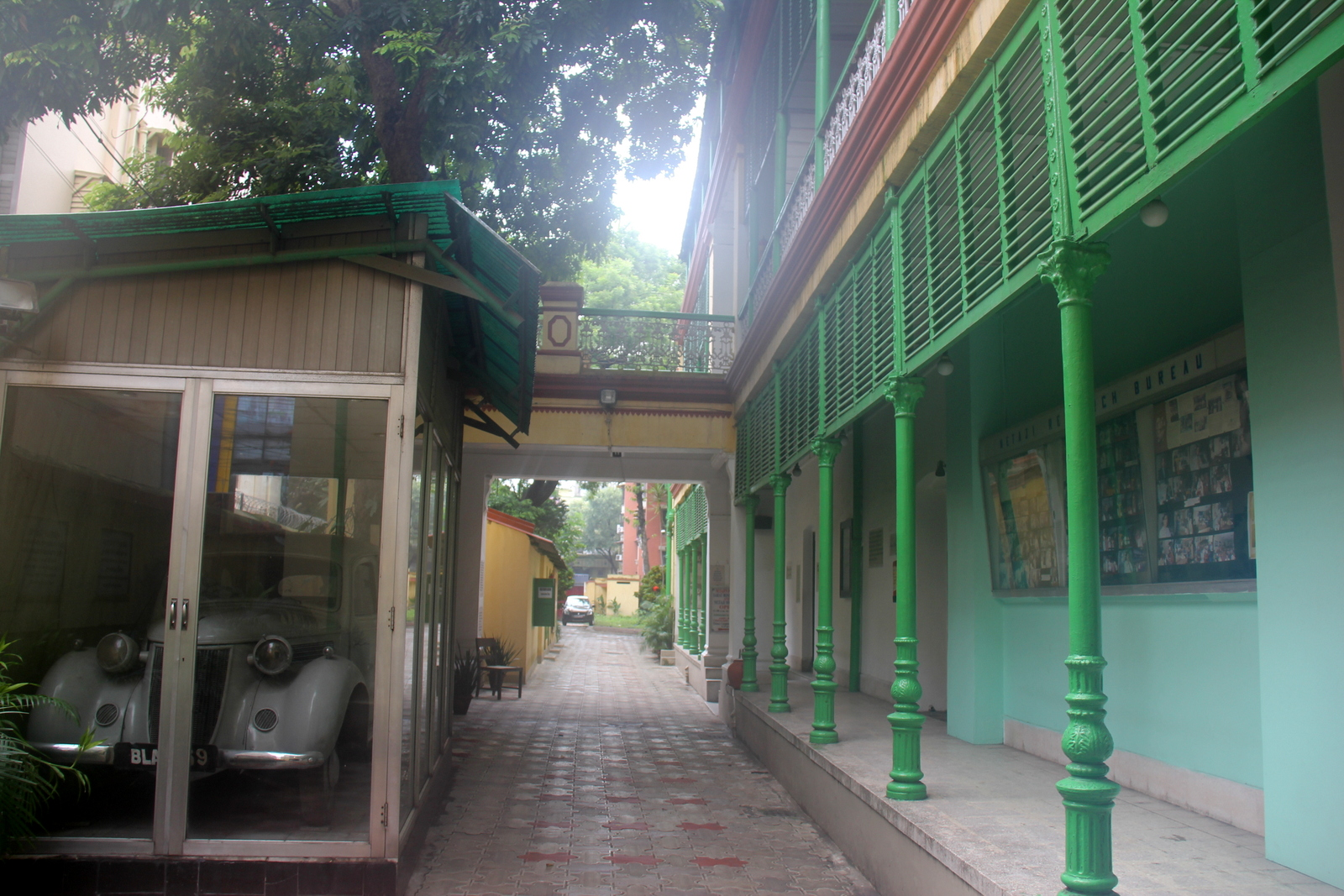
Netaji Bhawan

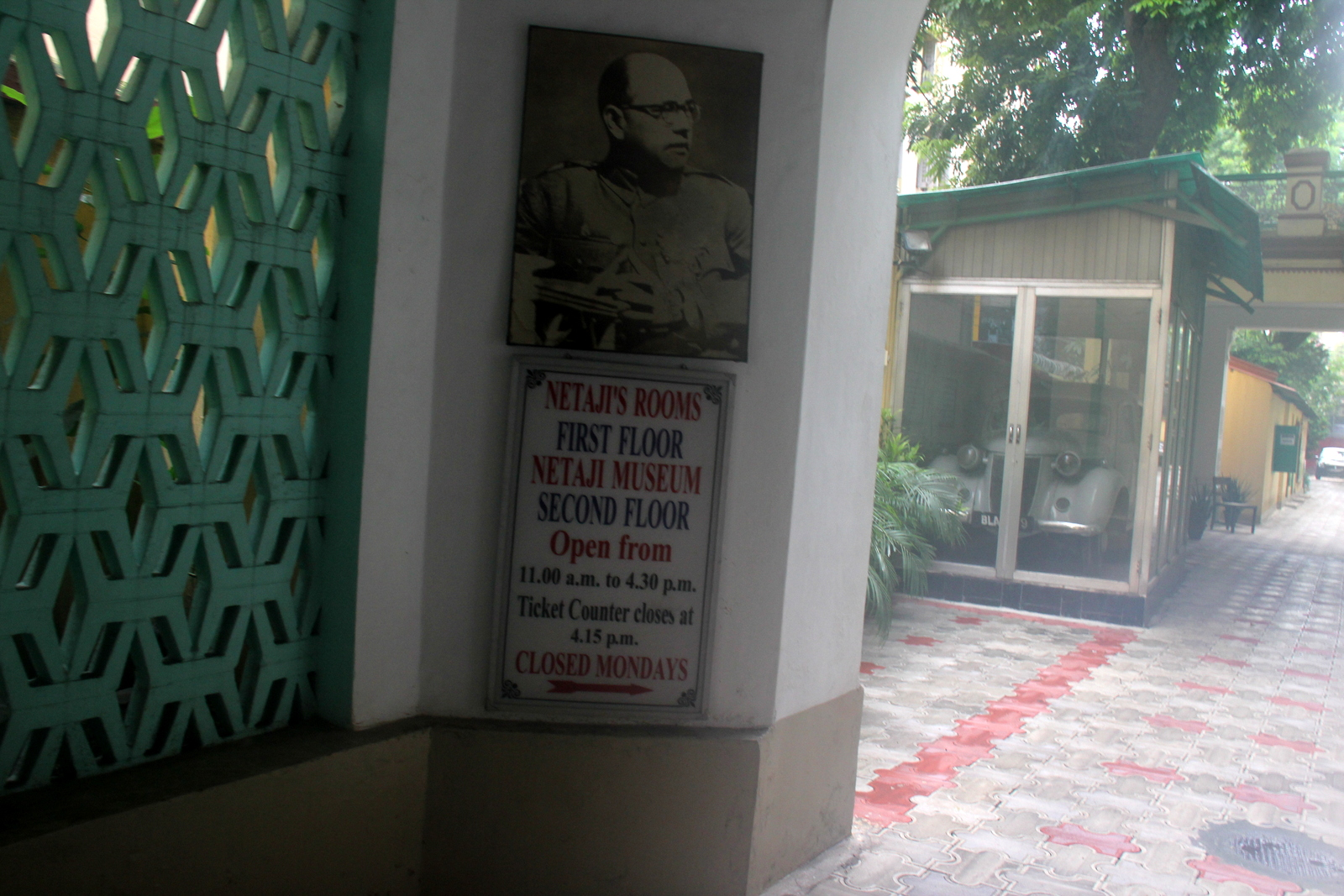
Netaji Bhawan
