= Kamada Kinkar Mukherjee =

Indian independence activist

Kamada Kinkar Mukherjee (born 25 March 1908) was an Indian independence activist and a member of the West Bengal Legislative Council from 1952 to 1964. He was married to Rajlakshmi Mukherjee and had 2 sons, Pranab Mukherjee who later became the President of India and Piyush Mukherjee and 4 daughters, Annapurna Banarjee, Swagata Das Mukherjee, Jharna and Krishna Mukherjee.
