= Naeem Mohaiemen =

Bangladeshi visual artist (born 1969)

- Occupations: Filmmaker, Photographer, Writer, Academic, Visual Artist
- Website: www.shobak.org

Naeem Mohaiemen uses film, photography, installation, and essays to research South Asia's postcolonial markers (the Indo-Pakistani War of 1947–1948 and the Bangladesh Liberation War of 1971). His projects on the 1970s revolutionary left explored the role of misrecognition within global solidarity.

== Education ==
Mohaiemen attended New Tripoli School in Libya and the Jesuit school St. Joseph Higher Secondary School in Dhaka. He received a BA from Oberlin College and received a PhD in anthropology in 2019 from Columbia University and is an Associate Professor of Visual Arts there.

== Films ==
Mohaiemen's films include the Turner Prize nominated duo of films Tripoli Cancelled (2017) and Two Meetings and a Funeral (2017), both of which premiered at Documenta 14 in Athens and Kassel. Tripoli Cancelled had an American premiere at Museum of Modern Art, New York., and Two Meetings and a Funeral had a British premiere at Tate Britain as part of the 2018 Turner Prize. American premiere at Art Institute of Chicago.

His films explore histories of the revolutionary left as "accidental trojan horse", including Last Man in Dhaka Central (2015) which premiered at the 56th Venice Biennale as part of "All The World's Futures" curated by Okwui Enwezor., Afsan's Long Day (2014) which premiered at the Museum of Modern Art in New York as part of "Doc Fortnight". and had a festival premiere at Oberhausen and a British premiere at the British Film Institute London Film Festival., The first film in this series is United Red Army (2011) about the Japan Airlines Flight 472 (1977) Hijacking in which premiered at Sharjah Biennial, Hot Docs, and International Documentary Film Festival Amsterdam (IDFA), has shown at The New Museum.

His films are in the permanent collection of the Tate Modern., the Museum of Modern Art, Sharjah Art Foundation, and Kiran Nadar Museum.

== Exhibitions ==
Chapters from Mohaiemen's project on the 1970s revolutionary left ("The Young Man Was") have exhibited at the Mahmoud Darwish Museum, Gyantapas Abdur Razzaq Foundation, Bangladesh Shilpakala Academy, Bengal Foundation Shilpalay, Chobi Mela, Documenta 14, Kiran Nadar Museum, Museum of Modern Art New York, British Museum, Tate Britain, New Museum (New York), Frieze Art Fair (London), MUAC Mexico City, the 56th Venice Biennial, and the Lahore, Sharjah, Marrakech, and Eva (Ireland) Biennials.

Mohaiemen co-founded Visible Collective, a collective of New York-based artists and lawyers investigating post-9/11 security panic. Visible's work exhibited internationally, including the 2006 Whitney Biennial of American Art ("Wrong Gallery" room) and L'institut des cultures d'Islam in Paris.

His solo projects have looked at military coups ("My Mobile Weighs A Ton" at Dhaka Gallery Chitrak), surveillance ("Otondro Prohori, Guarding Who?", Chobi Mela V at Bangladesh Shilpakala Academy), Indian partition ("Kazi in Nomansland" at Dubai Third Line), architectural nationalism ("Penn Station Kills Me" at Exit Art), and dueling leftist and Islamist politics ("Live True Life or Die Trying" at Cue Art Foundation, New York).

== Writing ==
Mohaiemen is author of Prisoners of Shothik Itihash. He edited the anthologies Between Ashes and Hope: Chittagong Hill Tracts in the blind spot of Bangladesh nationalism, Collectives in atomised time,

He was the primary critic of Dead Reckoning, a book by Sarmila Bose on the 1971 war of Bangladesh. His response was cited by the BBC and published in Economic & Political Weekly ("Waiting for a real reckoning on 1971"). Bose responded to his remarks in the same periodical, followed by a rebuttal from Mohaiemen.

Essays on Bangladesh history include"Muktijuddho: Polyphony of the Ocean", "Accelerated Media and the 1971 Genocide", "Musee Guimet as Proxy Fight", "Mujtaba Ali: Amphibian Man" (The Rest of Now, Rana Dasgupta ed.), "Mujib Coat" (Bidoun journal), and "Everybody wants to be Singapore" (Carlos Motta’s The Good Life). He wrote the chapter on religious and ethnic minorities in the Ain o Salish Kendro Annual Report for Bangladesh.

Essays on diaspora include "Known unknowns of the class war" (Margins, Asian American Writers Workshop),"The skin I'm in: Afro-Bengali solidarity and possible futures" (Margins, Asian American Writers Workshop), "Beirut, Silver Porsche Illusion" (Men of the Global South, Zed Books), "Why Mahmud Can’t Be a Pilot" (Nobody Passes: Rejecting the rules of Gender and Conformity, Seal Press), and "No Exit" (Asian Superhero Comics, New Press).

Essays on culture include "Islamic Roots of HipHop" (Sound Unbound, MIT Press; Runner Up for Villem Flusser Theory Award), "Adman blues become artist liberation" (Indian Highway, curated by Hans Ulrich Obrist) and "At the coed dance " (Art Lies: Death of the Curator).

== Awards ==
- 2014: Guggenheim Fellowship from the John Simon Guggenheim Memorial Foundation
- 2018: Turner Prize nominee
- Shortlisted for the 2009 Villem Flusser Award and the 2019 Herb Alpert Award.
