= His Majesty's Opponent =

Book written by Sugata Bose

- Front cover
- Author: Sugata Bose
- Language: English
- Subject: Biography of Subhas Chandra Bose
- Genre: Biography
- Publication date: May 2011

His Majesty's Opponent or His Majesty's Opponent: Subhas Chandra Bose and India's Struggle Against Empire is an English book written by Sugata Bose. This is a biography of Subhas Chandra Bose. The book was first published in May 2011.

== Reception ==
Hindustan Times wrote in their review that the book was a "template biography", and was "arrestingly written".
