= The Indian Struggle =

Indian history book by Subhas Chandra Bose

The Indian Struggle, 1920–1942
- 1998 edition
- Author: Subhas Chandra Bose
- Published: Part I (1920–1934) Wishart & Co., London 1935; Part II (1935–1942) Italy 1942
- OCLC: 3863565

The Indian Struggle, 1920–1942 is a two-part book by the Indian nationalist leader Netaji Subhash Chandra Bose that covers the 1920–1942 history of the Indian independence movement to end British imperial rule over India. Banned in India by the British colonial government, The Indian Struggle was published in the country only in 1948 after India became independent. The book analyses a period of the Indian independence struggle from the Non-Cooperation and Khilafat Movements of the early 1920s to the Quit India and Azad Hind movements of the early 1940s.

== Two parts ==
The first part of The Indian Struggle covering the years 1920–1934 was published in London in 1935 by Lawrence and Wishart. Bose had been in exile in Europe following his arrest and detention by the colonial government for his association with the revolutionary group, the Bengal Volunteers and his suspected role in several acts of violence. In Vienna, where he wrote the book, Bose had to largely rely on memory as he did not have access to documentary material. When Bose arrived in Karachi in December 1934 in defiance of the colonial government's ban on his entry into India, he was arrested and the original manuscript of the book seized. Published in London the following year, the book was well received by the British press and critics. The British were quick to ban it in India and Samuel Hoare, the Secretary of State for India, justified this action to the House of Commons on the grounds that it encouraged terrorism and direct action among the masses.

The second part dealing with 1935–1942 was written by Bose during the Second World War. A planned German edition of the book never came to fruition during Bose's stay in Europe during 1941–'43 while an Italian edition came out in 1942. He was assisted in writing the book by Emilie Schenkl whom he went on to marry and who bore him a daughter.

== Themes ==
The Indian Struggle contains Bose's evaluation of Gandhi's role and contribution to the independence struggle, his own vision for an independent India and his approach to politics. Bose was critical of Gandhi in the book accusing the Mahatma of being too soft and almost naive in his dealings with the colonial regime and who with his status quoism had become "the best policeman the Britisher had in India". Bose also predicted a left-wing revolt in the Indian National Congress that would give rise to a new political party with a "clear ideology, program and plan of action" that would among other things "stand for the interests of the masses", advocate the complete independence of the Indian people, advocate a federal India with a strong central government and support land reforms, state planning and a system of panchayats.

On his way back to Vienna in 1935, Bose met with Benito Mussolini in Rome where he gave the dictator a copy of his book. Bose was opposed to Nehru's anti-Fascism and argued instead for a synthesis of communism and fascism in India. While a proponent of military discipline in political life and an advocate of a government by a strong party, Bose was also opposed to totalitarianism rejecting the model of the Nazi party and calling for democracy both within and among political parties. Bose's ideological leaning, which he outlines in the book, has been described as 'fascistic' but it was shaped by his increasing frustration with the failure to realise Indian independence and not by a sense of megalomania.
