= Prabhabati Bose =

Indian social activist and politician

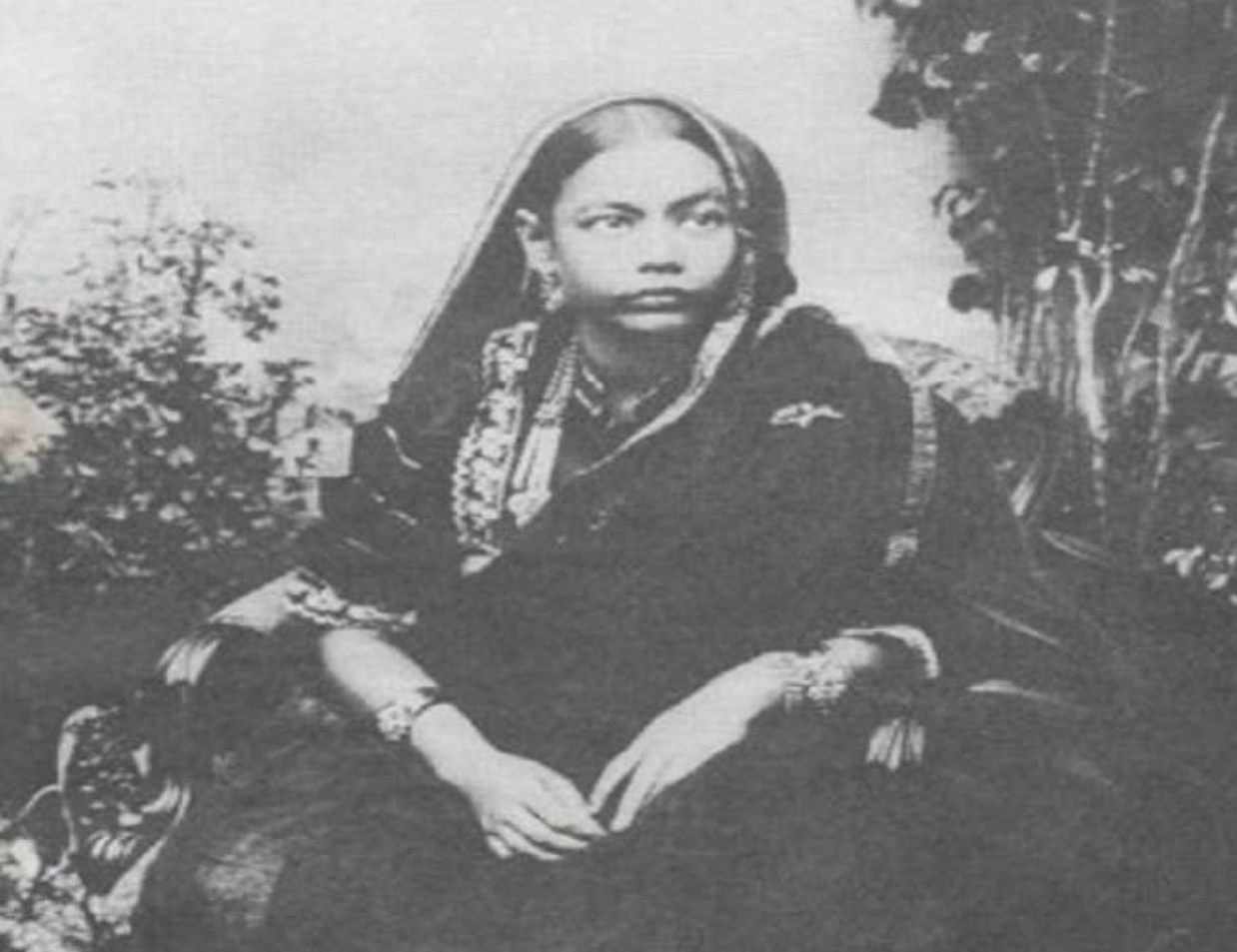
- Prabhabati Bose (Dutt)
- Born: Prabhabati Dutt; 1869; Calcutta, Bengal, British India (now West Bengal, India)
- Died: 29 December 1943 (aged 74); Calcutta, Bengal, British India (now West Bengal, India)
- Occupations: Social activist and politician
- Known for: Mother of Netaji Subhash Chandra Bose and Sarat Chandra Bose
- Spouse: Janakinath Bose
- Children: 14, 8 sons (Subhash Chandra Bose, Sarat Chandra Bose & others) and 6 daughters
- Parents: Ganganarayan Dutta (father); Kamala Kamini Dutta (mother)
- Relatives: Roby Datta (cousin)

Prabhabati Bose (née Dutta) was an Indian social activist and politician. She was born in 1869 into a respected Kayastha Bharadwaja clan Dutta family of Hatkhola, in Calcutta North. She was the eldest daughter of Ganganarayan Dutta and Kamala Kamini Dutta of Kashinath Dutta Road, Baranagore (a suburb of Calcutta), India. Subhas Chandra Bose is her son.

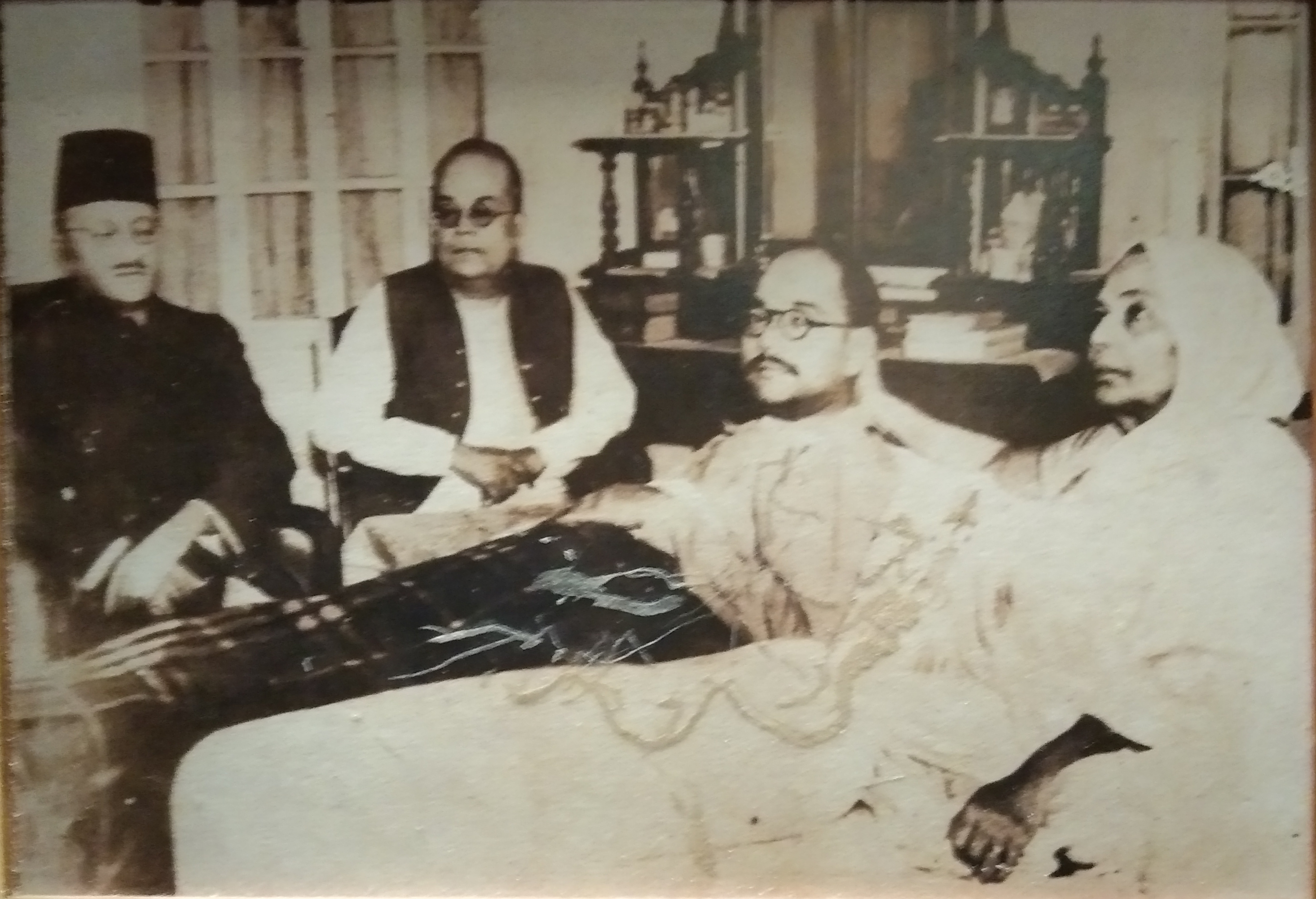
Photograph of Subhas Chandra Bose lying on his bed after release from prison with Prabhabati Bose, Satish Chandra Bose and Abdur Rahman Siddiqi on 5.10.1940 displayed at Netaji Museum and Centre for Studies in Himalayan Languages Society & Culture, Giddha Pahar, Darjeeling district, West Bengal

In 1880, at the age of 11, she was married off to Janakinath Bose who hailed from a Kulin Bose family from the village Kodalia (located near Sonarpur).

== Marriage and children ==
Prabhabati and Janakinath Bose had fourteen children together. She was very involved in their education and many members of the extended Bose family made significant contributions to Indian society. Not only was Prabhabati the matriarch of Bose family, but following her parents' deaths she and her husband took care of her younger siblings.

She gave birth to fourteen children, six daughters and eight sons, among whom were nationalist leader Sarat Chandra Bose, Netaji Subhas Chandra Bose and distinguished cardiologist Dr. Sunil Chandra Bose.

== Political activism ==
In 1928, Prabhabati was selected president of the Mahila Rashtriya Sangha.
