= Krishna Bose =

Indian politician, author and social worker (1930–2020)

Member of Parliament, Lok Sabha
- In office 15 May 1996 – 16 May 2004
- Preceded by: Malini Bhattacharya
- Succeeded by: Dr. Sujan Chakraborty
- Constituency: Jadavpur

Personal details
- Born: 26 December 1930 Dacca, Bengal Presidency, British India
- Died: 22 February 2020 (aged 89) Kolkata, West Bengal, India
- Party: Trinamool Congress (1998–2004); Indian National Congress (1996–1998)
- Spouse: Sisir Kumar Bose
- Education: Calcutta University; Bhatkhande Sanskriti Vishwavidyalaya
- Profession: Politician, writer, educationalist
- Website: krishnabose.com

Krishna Bose (26 December 1930 – 22 February 2020) was an Indian politician, educator, author and social worker. She was a Member of Parliament elected from the Jadavpur constituency in West Bengal as an Trinamool Congress candidate. She taught at City College, Kolkata for 40 years, and thereafter remained its principal for 8 years.

== Early life & education ==
Bose was born on 26 December 1930 in Dacca to Charu C. Chaudhuri and Chhaya Devi Chaudhurani. Her father specialised in constitutional studies and was one of the secretaries of the West Bengal Legislative Assembly. She earned a B.A. (Hons) and an M.A. in English Literature from Calcutta University, Calcutta, West Bengal and the prestigious degree of Sangeet-Visharad from Bhatkhande Music Institute, Lucknow, Uttar Pradesh.

== Personal life ==
She was married to Sisir Kumar Bose, on 9 December 1955 and had two sons, Sumantra Bose, Sugata Bose and a daughter Sarmila Bose. Sisir Bose is the son of Sarat Chandra Bose, the elder brother of Subhas Chandra Bose. He too fought against the British Raj and was imprisoned in Lahore Fort and Red Fort for his role in Subhas Chandra Bose's escape from Calcutta in 1941 during the Quit India Movement and World War II.

== Career ==
Krishna taught for 40 years at the City College, Kolkata, where she was Head of the Department of English and served as the Principal of the college for eight years.

She was first elected as a member of Parliament to the 11th Lok Sabha during the 1996–1998 term from Jadavpur as a member of Congress. She was also a member of Parliament in 12th, (1998–1999) and 13th (1999–2004) Lok Sabhas. During her 3rd term, she served as:

- Chairperson, Committee on External Affairs
- Member, General Purposes Committee
- Member, Joint Committee on Patents (Second Amendment) Bill, 1999
- Member, Committee on Official Language

== Interests and accomplishments ==
Bose was actively involved in public work. She was the president of the Trust of the Institute of Child Health, Calcutta and chaired the Council of the Netaji Research Bureau, the president of Vivek Chetana – a non-profit organisation for disadvantaged women and children and a member of the international P.E.N. Krishna was a columnist for journals in English and Bengali such as Desh, Anandabazar Patrika, Jugantor, Amrit Bazar Patrika, The Statesman, Telegraph, Illustrated Weekly of India. She also worked in the areas of women and child development and for the welfare of the handicapped.

== Death ==
Bose died on 22 February 2020 in a hospital off EM Bypass in Kolkata at the age of 89. She was suffering from age-related ailments and had a second stroke few days before.
