= Sugata Bose =

Indian historian and politician

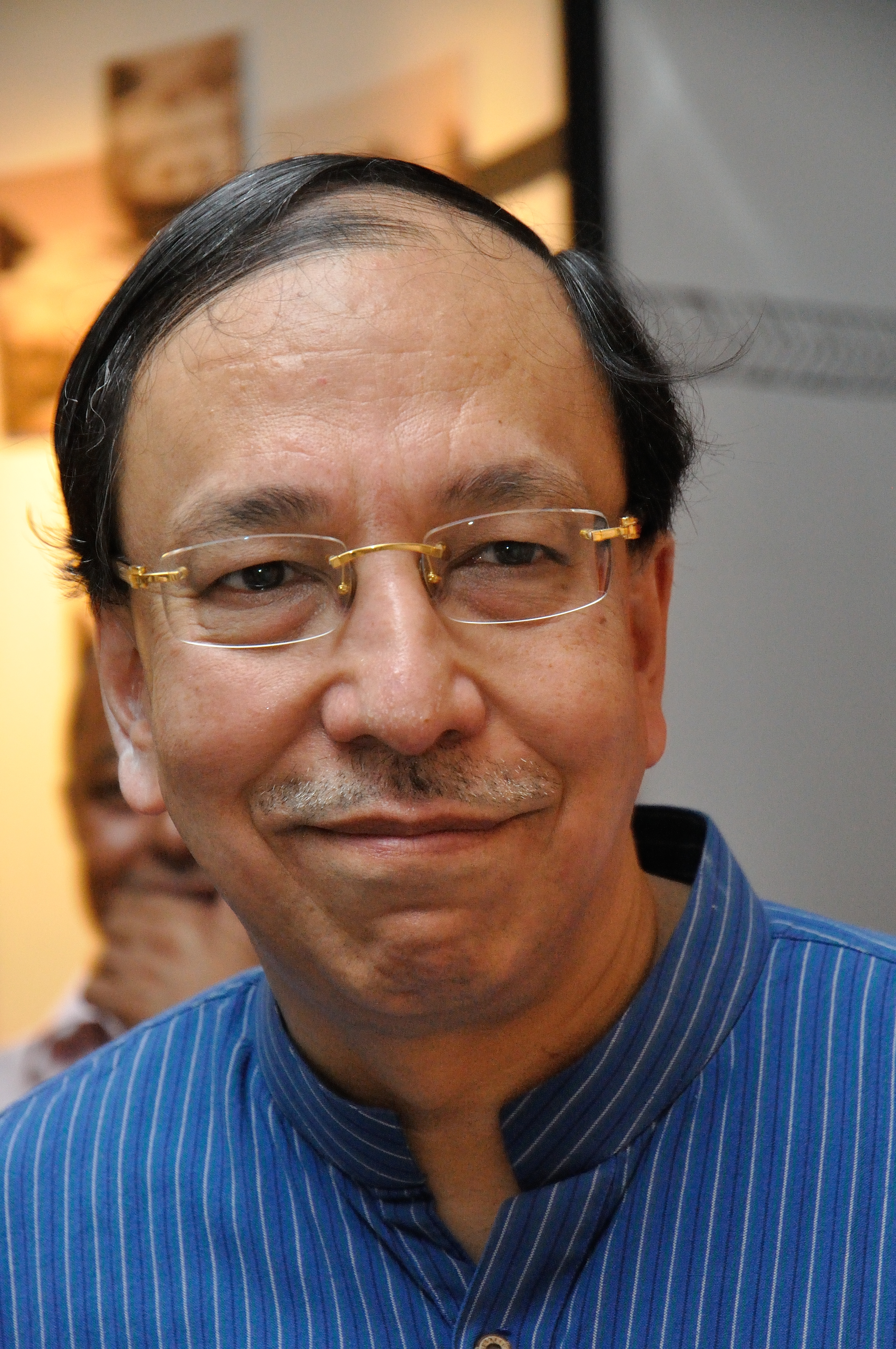
- Bose in 2015
- Born: 7 September 1956 (age 70); Kolkata, West Bengal, India
- Education: University of Calcutta (B.A.); University of Cambridge (PhD)
- Occupations: Historian at Harvard University; Member of parliament from Jadavpur Constituency in West Bengal (2014-2019)
- Employer: Harvard University
- Notable work: A Hundred Horizons, His Majesty's Opponent
- Political party: Trinamool Congress
- Spouse: Ayesha Jalal
- Parent(s): Krishna Bose, Sisir Kumar Bose
- Website: www.sugatabose.com

Sugata Bose

Member of Parliament for Jadavpur
- In office 16 May 2014 – 23 May 2019
- Preceded by: Kabir Suman
- Succeeded by: Mimi Chakraborty

Sugata Bose (born 7 September 1956) is an Indian historian and politician who has taught and worked in the United States since the mid-1980s. His fields of study are South Asian and Indian Ocean history. Bose is the Gardiner Chair of Oceanic History and Affairs at Harvard University. He has served as Director of Graduate Studies in History at Harvard and as the Founding Director of Harvard’s South Asia Institute. Before taking up the Gardiner Chair at Harvard in 2001, he was a Fellow of St. Catharine’s College, University of Cambridge, and Professor of History and Diplomacy at Tufts University. Bose is also the director of the Netaji Research Bureau in Kolkata, India, a research center and archives devoted to the life and work of Bose's great uncle, the Indian nationalist, Netaji Subhas Chandra Bose. Bose is the author most recently of His Majesty's Opponent: Subhas Chandra Bose and India's Struggle against Empire (2011) and A Hundred Horizons: The Indian Ocean in the Age of Global Empire (2006).

From 2014 to 2019, Bose served as a Member of Parliament (MP) of India, elected to 16th Lok Sabha from the Jadavpur Constituency in West Bengal. He was also a Member of the Standing Committee on External Affairs during his tenure as the Member of the Parliament of India.

== Early life and family ==
Sugata Bose was born in Calcutta, India. After studying at Presidency College, Kolkata, University of Calcutta Bose subsequently completed his PhD at the University of Cambridge before being named a research fellow of St. Catharine's College at Cambridge in 1981.

The grandnephew of Indian nationalist Netaji Subhas Chandra Bose and grandson of nationalist Sarat Chandra Bose. His father was paediatrician and legislator Sisir Kumar Bose and his mother was educator and legislator Krishna Bose. Bose's brother, Sumantra Bose, teaches at the London School of Economics; his sister, Sarmila Bose, is a researcher at Oxford University.

== Academic career ==
After completing his PhD at Cambridge, Sugata Bose began his career as a professor of history and diplomacy at Tufts University. In 2001 Bose was appointed to the Gardiner Chair of Oceanic History and Affairs at Harvard University, a position that had lain vacant for almost two decades, one which had been previously occupied by historians of the Western Hemisphere, but one for which Harvard specifically wanted a historian of South Asia. From 2003 to 2010, Bose headed up the university's South Asia initiative as well as the graduate program in the history department.

== Books ==
In 2011 Bose published His Majesty's Opponent: Subhas Chandra Bose and India's Struggle against Empire, a biography of his great uncle Subhas Bose. The biography, a trade book, has been criticised in scholarly reviews for soft-pedaling or oversimplifying Subhas Chandra Bose's alliances with Italian Fascism, German National Socialism, and Japanese imperialism. The book has also been criticised for its optimistic speculations on what Subhas Bose might have accomplished had he lived. Some popular reviews have been more positive.

In his earlier A Hundred Horizons: The Indian Ocean in the Age of Global Empire (2006), Bose attempts to challenge the thesis pioneered by Kirti N. Chaudhuri in Trade and Civilisation in the Indian Ocean: An Economic History from the Rise of Islam to 1750, Cambridge University Press, 1985, ISBN 9780521285421 and developed by Andre Wink and others, which holds that the world's first "global economy," the trans-Indian-ocean maritime economy—whose trade was assisted by the alternating winds and currents of the monsoons and which arose in the wake of the spread of Islam—was in turn undercut by European capitalism in the early 18th century. Instead, Bose contends, in the main thesis of his book, an inter-regional economy of middle-level bazaar merchants and traders continued well into the late 1920s, existing between the dominant European capitalists at the top and the peasants and peddlers at the bottom. This according to Bose, was not just the case in the market of goods and services, but also in the barter of ideas and culture. Attempting to bolster the latter notion are sections in the book on Mohandas K. Gandhi, Rabindranath Tagore, and Bose's great uncle Subhas Chandra Bose. A Hundred Horizons was praised by academic reviewers for explicating the transformations to networks which linked Indian Ocean societies, beyond the influence of colonial empires, and for exploring "cosmopolitan notions of anticolonialism" throughout the Indian Ocean world. However, Bose's delineation of that economy has been criticised for not going much beyond India and Indians, for reducing the complex exchange between the British and India to a clash of Indian nationalism and British authoritarianism; and for not providing sufficient warrant for the main thesis in the book.

Bose is also the author and editor of books on the economic, social and political history of modern South Asia. Beginning his career with work on the economy of agrarian Bengal, Bose published two volumes on his research. Agrarian Bengal: Economy, Social Structure and Politics, 1919–1947, published in 1986, contextualised rural economic life within the wider currents of the global economy, while a 1993 contribution to the New Cambridge History of India, Peasant Labour and Colonial Capital: Rural Bengal since 1770, analysed two and a half centuries of regional economic and social change.

== Political career ==
Sugata Bose was a Trinamool Congress MP (2014–2019) at the 16th Lok Sabha, representing the Jadavpur constituency.

== Other activities ==
In January 2012, Bose joined New Yorker editor David Remnick, former New York Times editor Joseph Lelyveld and journalist Peter Popham at the sixth Jaipur Literature Festival in a panel on the challenges of biographical writing.

Bose has been active in researching, speaking, and publishing on Rabindranath Tagore, contributing to projects across different media. In 2007, Krishna and Sugata Bose co-edited Purabi: the East in its Feminine Gender, a book and CD of Tagore's poetry and music. Bose has produced a four-CD set of Tagore's songs written outside of India as Visva Yatri Rabindranath, and has lectured widely on Tagore in North America, Europe, and Asia.

Beyond his work at Harvard and Tufts, Bose has helped steer two major projects advancing higher education in India. Since 2007, Bose has been a member of the Government of India's Nalanda Mentor Group, which seeks to establish an international university on the site of the ancient University of Nalanda in Bihar. Since 2011, Bose has served as chairman of the Presidency College Mentor Group, which seeks to revitalise the 194-year-old Kolkata college. He also served on the Social Sciences jury for the Infosys Prize in 2009, and the Humanities jury in 2015 and 2016.

== Bibliography ==
=== Books ===
- Bose, Sugata (1986). Agrarian Bengal: economy, social structure, and politics, 1919-1947. Cambridge: Cambridge University Press. ISBN 9780521053624.
- Bose, Sugata (1990). South Asia and world capitalism. Delhi New York: Oxford University Press. ISBN 9780195625448.
- Bose, Sugata (1993). Rural Bengal since 1770. The New Cambridge History of India. Cambridge: Cambridge university press. ISBN 9780521033220.
- Bose, Sugata (1994). Credit, markets, and the agrarian economy of colonial India. Delhi New York: Oxford University Press. ISBN 9780195633085.
- Bose, Subhas Chandra (1997). Bose, Sugata; Bose, Sisir K. (eds.). The essential writings of Netaji Subhas Chandra Bose. Delhi: Oxford University Press. ISBN 9780195648546.
- Bose, Sugata; Jalal, Ayesha (1997). Nationalism, democracy, and development: state and politics in India. Delhi New York: Oxford University Press. ISBN 9780195639445.
- Bose, Sugata (2006). A hundred horizons: the Indian Ocean in the age of global empire. Cambridge, Massachusetts: Harvard University Press. ISBN 9780674032194.
- Bose, Sugata; Jalal, Ayesha (2011). Modern South Asia: history, culture, political economy (3rd ed.). London New York: Routledge. ISBN 9780415779432.
- Bose, Sugata (2011). His majesty's opponent Subhas Chandra Bose and India's struggle against empire. Cambridge, Massachusetts: Belknap Press of Harvard University Press. ISBN 9780674047549.
- Bose, Sugata (2017). The Nation as Mother And Other Visions of Nationhood. New York: Penguin Random House. ISBN 9780670090112.

=== Chapters in books ===
- Bose, Sugata (2009). "Pondering poverty, fighting famines: towards a new history of economic ideas". In Kanbur, Ravi; Basu, Kaushik (eds.). Arguments for a better world: essays in honor of Amartya Sen. Volume II: Society, institutions and development. Oxford, NY: Oxford University Press. pp. 425–435. ISBN 9780199239979.

== Cited Sources ==
- Bertz, Ned (September 2007), "Review: A Hundred Horizons: The Indian Ocean in the Age of Global Empire by Sugata Bose", Journal of World History, 18 (3): 377–379, doi:10.1353/jwh.2007.0018, JSTOR 20079441, S2CID 162274034
- Campbell, Gwyn (October 2007), "Review of A Hundred Horizons: The Indian Ocean in the Age of Global Empire by Sugata Bose", American Historical Review, 112 (4): 1140–1141, doi:10.1086/ahr.112.4.1140-a, JSTOR 40008461
- Framke, Maria (2012), "Encounters with Fascism and National Socialist in non-European Regions: Review of five books 1. Sugata Bose, His Majesty's Opponent: Subhas Chandra Bose and India's Struggle Against Empire, 2011; 2. ..." (PDF), Sudasien-Chronik – South Asia Chronicle, vol. 2, Sudasien-Seminar der Humboldt-Universitat zu Berlin, pp. 350–374, doi:10.18452/17972, ISBN 978-3-86004-286-1
- Wainwright, A. Martin (Summer 2013), "Review of His Majesty's Opponent: Subhas Chandra Bose and India's Struggle against Empire, by Sugata Bose, 2011", Historian, 75 (2): 361–362, doi:10.1111/hisn.12010_25, S2CID 144712375
- Zachariah, Benjamin (2012), "Review of Sugata Bose. His Majesty's Opponent: Subhas Chandra Bose and India's Struggle Against Empire", American Historical Review, 117 (2): 109–110, doi:10.1086/ahr.117.2.509
