= Sarat Chandra Bose =

Indian independence activist and lawyer

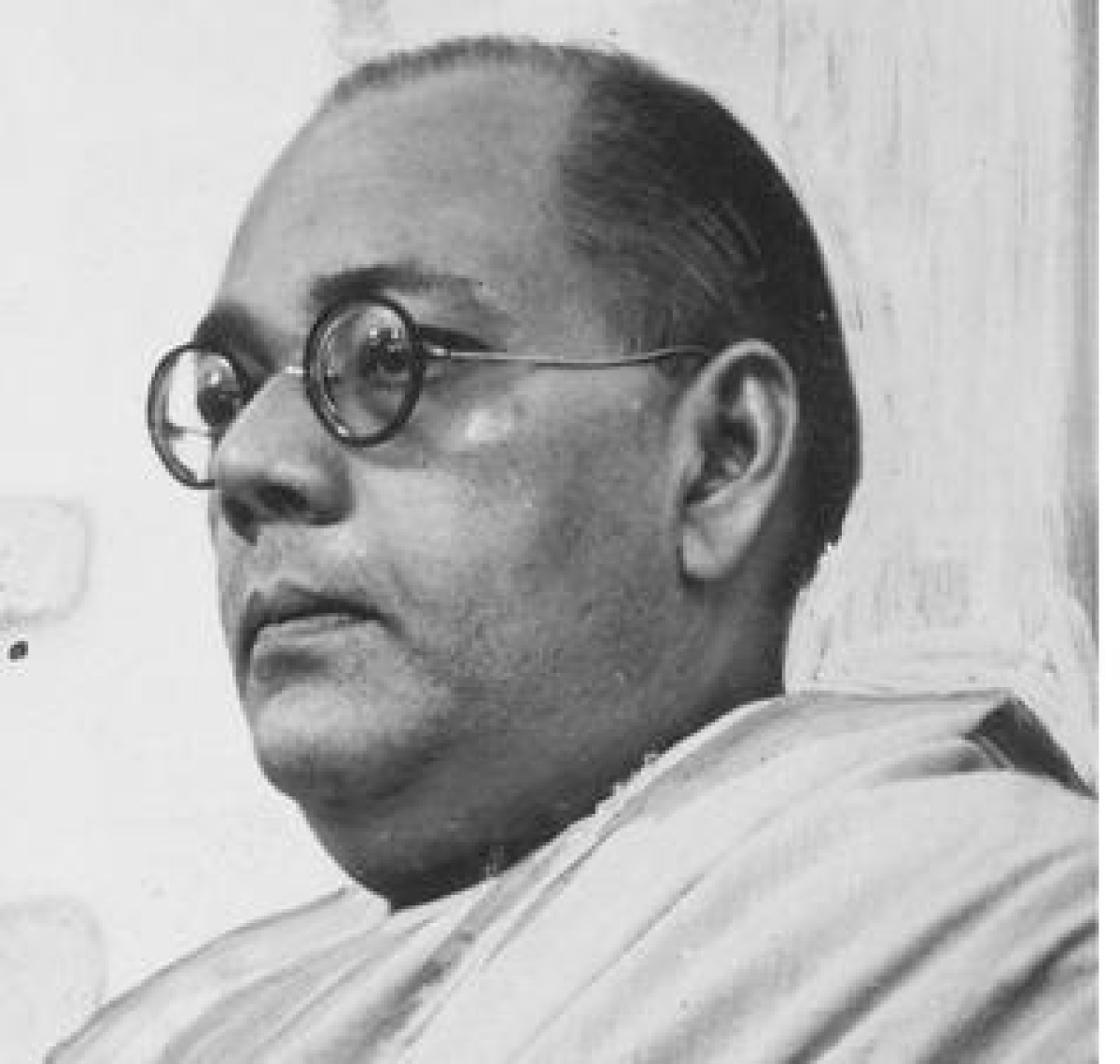
- Sarat Chandra Bose, c. 1940
- Born: 6 September 1889; Cuttack, Bengal, British India
- Died: 20 February 1950 (aged 60); Calcutta, West Bengal, India
- Education: University of Calcutta; Lincoln's Inn
- Occupations: Politician; barrister; freedom fighter
- Known for: Indian independence activist
- Office: President of West Bengal Pradesh Congress Committee
- Spouse: Bivabati Bose (m. 1909)
- Parents: Janakinath Bose (father); Prabhavati Dutt (mother)
- Relatives: Subhas Chandra Bose (brother)

Sarat Chandra Bose (6 September 1889 – 20 February 1950) was an Indian barrister and independence activist.

== Early life ==
He was born to Janakinath Bose (father) and Prabhabati Devi in Cuttack, Odisha on 6 September 1889. The family originally hailed from Kodalia (now Subhashgram), South 24 Parganas, West Bengal. He belonged to the Kulin Kayastha family. His father was descended from the Boses of Mahinagar (South 24 Parganas) while his mother, Prabhabati Devi, was part of the famous Dutta family of Hatkhola in north Kolkata. She gave birth to fourteen children, six daughters and eight sons, among whom were leftist leader Sarat Chandra Bose, Subhas Chandra Bose and distinguished cardiologist Dr. Sunil Chandra Bose. Sarat had two elder sisters. They were Pramilabala Mitra and Saralabala Dey. He had an elder brother, Satish Chandra Bose (1887 — 1948). He had six younger brothers, namely: Suresh Chandra Bose (1891 — 1972), Sudhir Chandra Bose (1892 — 10 February 1950), Dr. Sunil Chandra Bose (1894 — 17 November 1953), Subhas Chandra Bose (23 January 1897 — 16 September 1985), Shailesh Chandra Bose (1904 — 1984) and Santosh Chandra Bose. He had four younger sisters, they were Tarubala Roy, Malina Dutta, Pratibha Mitra, and Kanaklata Mitra. He married Bivabati Bose in 1909 at the age of twenty, and the couple had eight children who survived through adulthood.

Sarat Bose studied in Presidency College, Scottish Church College, then affiliated with the University of Calcutta, and then went to England in 1911 to become a barrister. He was called to the bar at Lincoln's Inn. He began a successful legal practice upon his return to India, but later abandoned it to join the Indian independence movement.

== Political career ==
In 1936, Bose became the President of the Bengal Pradesh Congress Committee, and served as a member of the All India Congress Committee from 1936 till 1947. Sarat Bose was arrested after the escape of Subhas the day before he was due to join as Cabinet Minister in the Fazlul Haq government. He was moved to jail in Mercara and then Coonoor where his health suffered. He was released in September 1945 after a 4 year prison sentence. From 1946 to 1947, Bose would lead the Congress delegation to the Central Legislative Assembly. He strongly supported the formation of the Indian National Army by Subhash Chandra Bose and actively participated in the Quit India movement. Following his brother's reported death in 1945, Bose led efforts to provide relief and aid to the families of INA soldiers through the INA Defence and Relief Committee. In 1946, he was appointed Member of the Interim Government for Works, Mines and Powers – the position of a minister in a national executive council led by Jawaharlal Nehru and Sardar Vallabhbhai Patel, and presided over by the Viceroy of India.

== Bengal partition and later life ==
However, Bose resigned from the AICC in disagreement over the Cabinet Mission Plan's call to partition Bengal between Hindu-majority and Muslim-majority regions. He backed the idea of an independent United Bengal put forward by the Bengali Muslim League leaders Huseyn Shaheed Suhrawardy and Abul Hashim. The proposal lacked broad support from the Muslim League or the Indian National Congress, however, and did not come to fruition. After India's independence, Bose led his brother's Forward Bloc and formed the Socialist Republican Party, advocating a socialist system for Bengal and India. He died on 20 February 1950, in Calcutta, aged 60.

== Family ==
Sarat Bose married Bivabati Dey, the daughter of Akshoy Kumar Dey and Subala Dey, in 1909. The couple had eight children. Their children included Ashoke Nath Bose, a Doctorate in Chemistry from Germany and eminent engineer; Amiya Nath Bose who participated in the Quit India Movement, became a Member of Parliament, and was also the Indian ambassador to Burma; Sisir Kumar Bose, who became a pediatrician and Member of Legislative Assembly, and Subrata Bose, who was an electrical engineer and also a Member of Parliament. His youngest daughter, Prof. Chitra Ghosh, is a distinguished academic, a social scientist, and also a member of the Parliament. His elder grandson, Sugata Bose, is a Gardiner Professor of Oceanic History and Affairs at Harvard University and a former member of the Lok Sabha. His younger grandson, Sumantra Bose, is a Professor of Comparative Politics at the London School of Economics and Political Science.

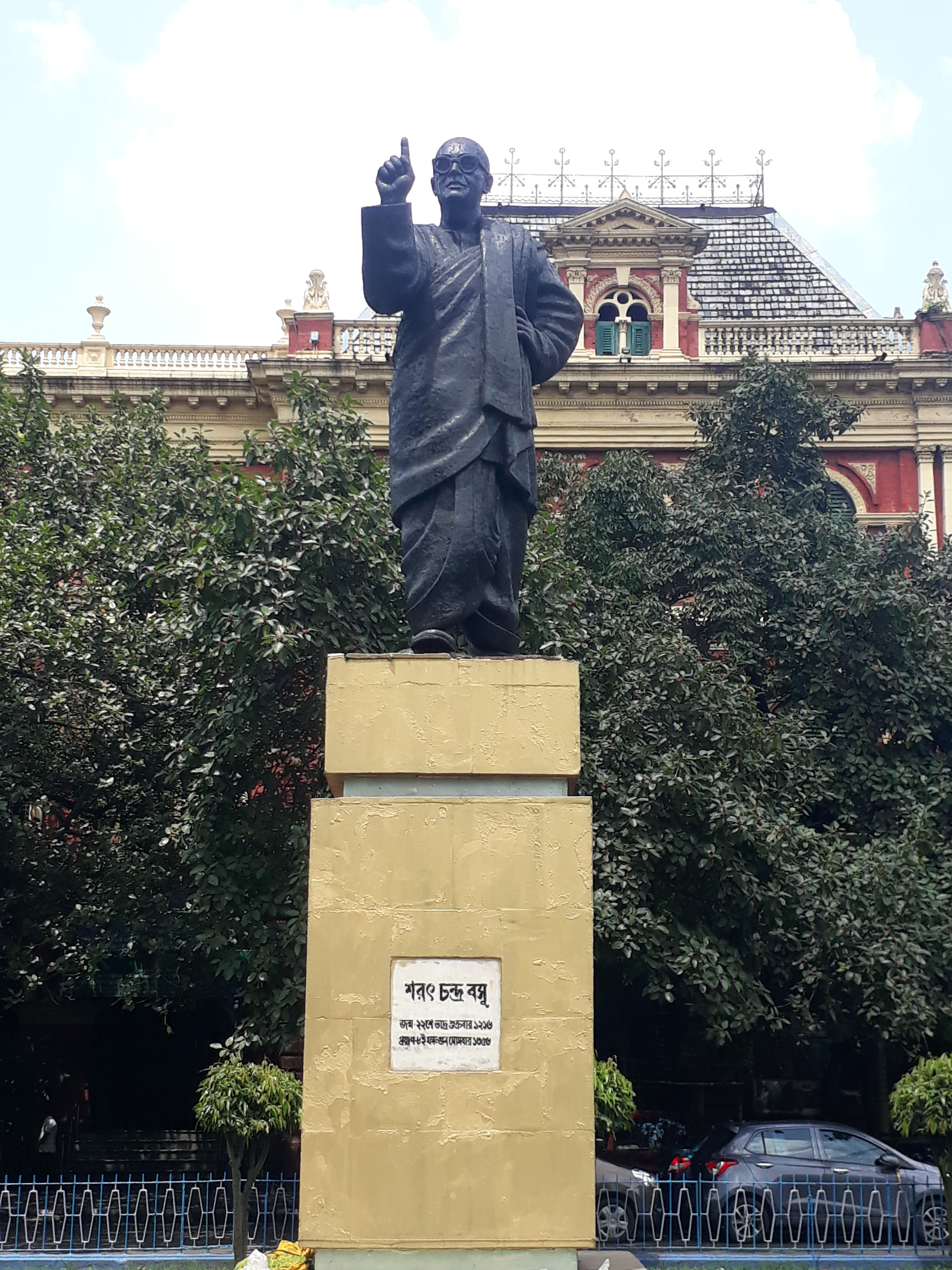
Statue of Sharat Chandra Bose in Kolkata

== Honours ==
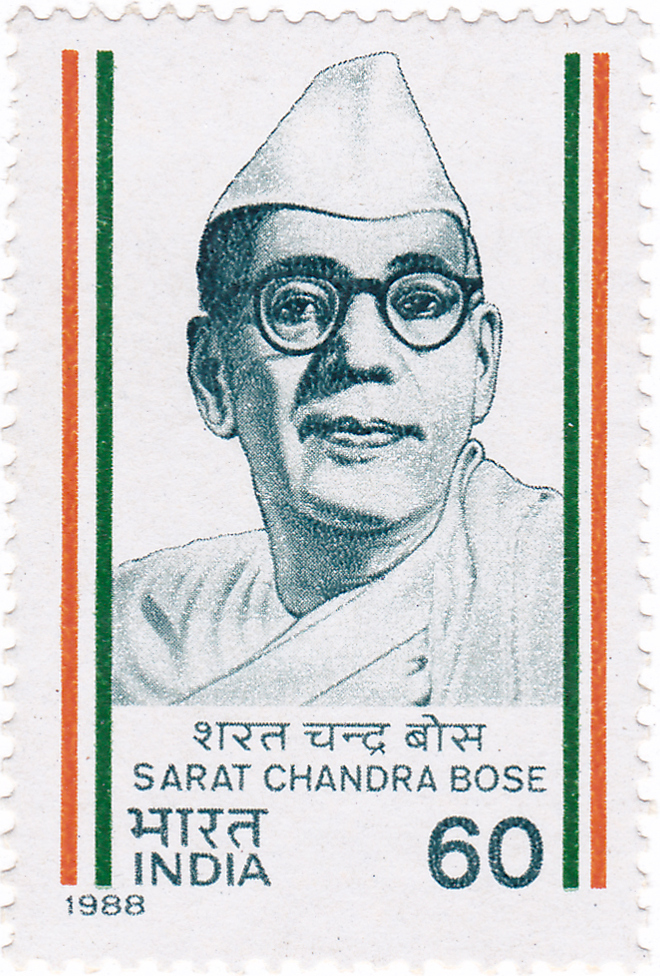
Sarat Chandra Bose 1988 stamp of India

A statue of Sarat Chandra Bose is situated beside Calcutta High Court.

In January 2014, Sarat Chandra Bose Memorial Lecture was instituted, and the maiden lecture was delivered by historian of International fame Leonard A. Gordon - who has penned a joint biography of Sarat and his younger brother Subhas, titled Brothers Against The Raj.
