= Sisir Kumar Bose =

Indian freedom fighter, author and legislator

- Born: 2 February 1920; Calcutta, Bengal Presidency, British India
- Died: 30 September 2000 (aged 80); Kolkata, West Bengal, India
- Occupations: Freedom fighter, pediatrician and legislator
- Spouse: Krishna Bose

Sisir Kumar Bose (2 February 1920 – 30 September 2000) was an Indian freedom fighter, pediatrician and legislator. He was the son of Indian nationalist leader Sarat Chandra Bose, nephew of Indian freedom fighter Subhas Chandra Bose and husband of former Member of Parliament Krishna Bose (1930–2020).

== Early life and education ==
He was born in Calcutta on 2 February 1920 to barrister and Indian nationalist leader Sarat Chandra Bose and Bivabati Bose (née Dey). He was educated at Calcutta Medical College.

== Role in Indian independence movement ==
In 1941, while a medical student in Calcutta, he helped his uncle, the Indian freedom fighter Subhas Chandra Bose escape from house arrest. He helped Subhas Bose plan his escape from his ancestral house on Elgin Road in Calcutta and drove him out of the house in secret up to Gomoh in the neighbouring state of Bihar, from where Subhas took a train to Peshawar. During the Quit India Movement in India launched by Mahatma Gandhi in 1942, Sisir Bose was badly injured in a police attack on a student protest and imprisoned in Presidency Jail in Calcutta and later interned at home in 1943. For assisting his uncle and continued involvement with the Indian independence movement, Sisir Bose was arrested again by the British colonial government and imprisoned in the Red Fort in Delhi, the Lahore Fort and Lyallpur Jail, including long periods in solitary confinement, until the end of the war.

After his release at the end of the Second World War Sisir Bose completed his medical studies and received advanced training in pediatrics in London, Sheffield and Vienna.

== Career as pediatrician ==
On his return to India Bose worked with Indian pediatrician K. C. Chaudhuri, who founded the first pediatric hospital in India, the Institute of Child Health in Calcutta, inaugurated in 1957. Sisir was Rockefeller Fellow at Harvard Medical School and the Children's Hospital in Boston and the first editor of Indian Pediatrics (1964–66). He became Director of the Institute of Child Health from 1972 for twenty years and then President until his death in 2000.

== Historical work ==
Bose was the Director and later Chairman of Netaji Research Bureau, Netaji Bhawan, located in the Bose family house on Elgin Road in Calcutta, from the 1950s to his death. The family house had been dedicated to the public by his father Sarat Chandra Bose in 1946 as a memorial to Subhas Chandra Bose. Sisir Bose built up the museum and archives at Netaji Bhawan over several decades and created an institute for history, politics and current affairs. The Wanderer car in which he drove his uncle Subhas out of their ancestral house on Elgin Road in Calcutta is displayed in the museum and was recently unveiled by the President of India after restoration.

== Politics ==
From 1982 to 1987 Bose served as a member of the legislative assembly of West Bengal for the Indian National Congress party, representing the Chowranghee constituency in Calcutta. From 1996 to 2004 his wife Krishna Bose became Member of Parliament for the Indian National Congress and later Trinamool Congress from the state.

== Writings ==
Sisir Kumar Bose edited or co-edited the complete works of Subhas Chandra Bose, published by Oxford University Press. He also edited and co-edited numerous other books on Subhas Chandra Bose, Sarat Chandra Bose and the Indian freedom movement, including Netaji and India's Freedom: Proceedings of the International Netaji Seminar 1973 (1975), Netaji: a Pictorial Biography (Ananda Publishers, 1975, 1995), The Voice of Sarat Chandra Bose (1979) and the collected works of Sarat Chandra Bose 1945-50 (I Warned My Countrymen, 1968). He co-authored a biography of Subhas Chandra Bose, A Beacon Across Asia, with Alexander Werth and S A Ayer (1973) and wrote Remembering My Father, a biography of Sarat Chandra Bose. His account of Subhas Bose's escape from India was published in Bengali by Ananda Publishers (Mahanishkraman, 1975, 2000) and in English as The Great Escape (Netaji Research Bureau, 1974, 1999). His account of the Bose family, Boshubari, was serialised for three years in Anandamela and published by Ananda Publishers in 1985.

== Legacy ==
After his death, the street in Calcutta adjacent to Netaji Bhawan, into which he turned when driving his uncle Subhas out of the house during his escape, was renamed Sisir Kumar Bose Sarani. In 2025, the Kolkata Municipal Corporation put a Blue Plaque on his house, marking it as Grade IIB heritage, honouring the space shared by many members of the Azad Hind Fauj since Independence. Additionally, the Netaji Research Bureau hosts a lecture every year in his memory.
