= Ludwig Alsdorf =

Ludwig Alsdorf (8 August 1904 – 23 March 1978) was a German Indologist and a professor at the University of Hamburg. He studied Jainism, Buddhism, and the Vedas and became an expert on India for the Nazi state following his book "Indien" (1940) which went into several editions. He was also involved in matters relating to the Nazi government and its anti-British propaganda through agents like Subhas Chandra Bose.

== Early life and academics ==
Alsdorf was born in Laufersweiler, Rhineland, the son of pastor Hermann Alsdorf (1865–1948) and Emilie Chelius (1878–1960). He studied Indian philology including Sanskrit, Persian and Arabic, under Heinrich Zimmer at Heidelberg, later studying under Walther Schubring at the University of Hamburg. He received a PhD in 1928 with a dissertation on the Kumarapalapartibodha, an ancient Jain text. He then worked with Heinrich Lüders at the University of Berlin. He received support from the foreign ministry to visit India in 1930 and taught German and French at the University of Allahabad. Here he worked with P. L. Vaidya and Hiralal Jain on Jain texts. He also travelled to Burma and Sri Lanka. He returned to Germany in 1932 and joined the NSDAP in 1933 (membership number 2697931) and underwent a labour service training at Bredtstadt and an ideological training course at the Prussian Lecturers' Academy in early 1934. In 1935 he completed his habilitation with an annotation of the Jain text Harivamshapurana, which received praise from other scholars as well as by Wolfgang Erxleben of the Nazi party "Hauptamt Wissenschaft". He then became a lecturer in Indology at the University of Berlin. He was also involved in the foreign affairs sections of the Deutsche Dozentenschaft. In 1936 Alsdorf joined the Motor Corps (Nationalsozialistisches Kraftfreikorps). The Nazi authorities however evaluated him as "politically unreliable". In 1938 Alsdorf applied to the University of Leipzig for a position in Indian philology which however went to Friedrich Weller. Alsdorf signed his letters with "Heil Hitler" but secret service reports doubted his ideological integrity, noting that he was an opportunist. In 1938 he succeeded Richard Schmidt at the University of Münster in 1938 but he was not given tenure. Erich Hoffmann who supported his appointment wrote that Aryan philology was needed at the university. Franz Taeschner who was professor of Oriental Studies noted that Indology had generated respect for German culture among Indians and that it was important to have the position. Alsdorf took his Hilter oath on 12 December 1938 as required by the ministry of education and he received a proper salary instead of his former stipend.

== Indien ==
Alsdorf noted in 1938 that he was asked by Egmont Zechlin to write a book on India in a series called "Weltpolitischer Bücherei". Alsdorf was exempted from military duty to complete this book in 1940. Alsdorf also offered courses on living languages Hindustani and Gujarati as well as in classical Sanskrit. Alsdorf's book "Indien" was published in 1940 and received praise, including from the "Führer" himself. The book included chapters on history of India before the British and criticized colonial rule and supported the Indian anti-colonial movements. It did not include racial ideas ascribed to Indians by the Indologist Christian Lassen who in his "Indische Altertumskunde" (1843–62) supported the idea of fair-skinned Aryans invading and subjugating dark-skinned aboriginals who were inferior. It declared the British as racists but justified Nazi race politics. He clarified his idea by claiming that unlike the Jewish minority in Germany who did not belong to the country, that the Indians were natives of India. He also noted that the British had generated anti-German feelings among the Indians and praised Gandhi's work in bringing Indians under the movement of the Indian National Congress. His portrayal of Gandhi as following ancient ideas on truth, morality, and non-violence helped the German policy of Ribbentrop to support Gandhi.

== Sonderreferat Indien ==
Alsdorf became an advisor on India-related matters and wrote a memorandum in 1941 "On the exercise of British domination on India". When Subhas Chandra Bose came to Berlin in 1941, the German foreign ministry set up a "Sonderreferat Indien" (SRI) under Ribbentrop. Alsdorf was made an academic assistant at the SRI and it also made use of the Indologist Helmuth von Glasenapp as an academic assistant. The director of the SRI was Adam von Trott zu Solz. Bose headed the "Free India Centre" in Berlin and the SRI was meant to oversee its activities. In 1941 he was also involved in determining the foreign ministry's wartime policy of courting Muslim support and wrote a memorandum on the Indian Muslims and the Pakistan plan. One of his notes was titled "Pakistan, the Indian Ulster". In 1944 he commented that it was beneficial for the Germans that Gandhi opposed the Pakistan plan. He was also to examine the activities of Congress politicians and the Indian Communist Party. Alsdorf was also involved "Operation Tiger" of the Abwehr to incite an anti-British uprising in the Northwest Frontier Province. Alsdorf invited soldiers of the Indian Legion (Infantry Regiment 950) along with Bose and others including Gurbachan Singh Mangat in a Berlin restaurant. Mangat noted that Alsdorf spoke to them in refined Hindustani.
