= Netaji Subhas Chandra Bose: The Forgotten Hero =

Netaji Shubhas Chandra Bose: The Forgotten Hero
- Directed by: Shyam Benegal
- Written by: Atul Tiwari; Shama Zaidi
- Produced by: Raj Pius; Barbara von Wrangell
- Starring: Sachin Khedekar; Kulbhushan Kharbanda; Rajit Kapur; Divya Dutta; Arif Zakaria
- Cinematography: Rajan Kothari
- Edited by: Aseem Sinha
- Music by: A. R. Rahman
- Distributed by: Sahara India Media Communication Ltd.
- Release dates: 3 November 2004 (London Film Festival); 13 May 2005 (India)
- Running time: 208 minutes
- Country: India
- Languages: Hindi; English
- Budget: ₹4 crore
- Box office: ₹1.25 crore

Netaji Subhas Chandra Bose: The Forgotten Hero is a 2004 Indian epic biographical war film, written and directed by Shyam Benegal. The film starred an ensemble cast of Sachin Khedekar, Kulbhushan Kharbanda, Rajit Kapur, Arif Zakaria, and Divya Dutta, among others. The film depicts the life of the Indian Independence leader Subhas Chandra Bose in Nazi Germany: 1941–1943, and in Japanese-occupied Asia 1943–1945, and the events leading to the formation of Azad Hind Fauj.

The production design was helmed by Samir Chanda, with a soundtrack, and background score by A. R. Rahman. Upon release, the film received wide critical acclaim at the BFI London Film Festival, and has garnered the National Film Award for Best Feature Film on National Integration, and the National Film Award for Best Production Design for that year. The film was screened retrospectively on August 14, 2016 at the Independence Day Film Festival jointly presented by the Indian Directorate of Film Festivals and Ministry of Defence, commemorating 70th Indian Independence Day.

== Plot ==
Set in British India, after a political disagreement with Mahatma Gandhi, Bose's arrest and subsequent release sets the scene for his escape to Germany, via Afghanistan and the Soviet Union. A few days before his escape, he sought solitude and, on this pretext, avoided meeting British guards and grew a beard. On the night of his escape, he dresses himself as a Pathan to avoid being identified. Bose escapes from under British surveillance at his house in Calcutta on 16 January 1941, accompanied by his nephew Sisir K. Bose in a car.

Bose journeys to Peshawar with the help of the Abwehr, where he was met by Akbar Shah and Bhagat Ram Talwar. Bose was taken to the home of Abad Khan, a trusted friend of Akbar Shah's. On 26 January 1941, Bose begins his journey to reach Russia through British India's North West frontiers with Afghanistan. For this reason, he enlists the help of Mian Akbar Shah, then a Forward Bloc leader in the North-West Frontier Province. Shah had been out of India en route to the Soviet Union, and suggests a novel disguise for Bose to assume. Since Bose could not speak one word of Pashto, it would make him an easy target of Pashto speakers working for the British. For this reason, Shah suggests that Bose act deaf and dumb, and let his beard grow to mimic those of the tribesmen. Bose's guide Bhagat Ram Talwar, unknown to him, is actually a Soviet agent.

Supporters of the Aga Khan III help Bose across the border into Afghanistan where he was met by an Abwehr unit posing as a party of road construction engineers from the Organization Todt who then aided his passage across Afghanistan via Kabul to the border with Soviet Russia. After assuming the disguise of a Pashtun insurance agent ("Ziauddin") to reach Afghanistan, Bose changes his disguise and travels to Moscow on the Italian passport of an Italian nobleman "Count Orlando Mazzotta". From Moscow, he reached Rome, and from there he travels to Germany. Once in Russia the NKVD transport Bose to Moscow where he hope that Russia's traditional enmity to British rule in India would result in support for his plans for a popular rising in India. However, Bose found the Soviets' response disappointing and was rapidly passed over to the German Ambassador in Moscow, Count von der Schulenburg. He had Bose flown on to Berlin in a special courier aircraft at the beginning of April where he was to receive a more favorable hearing from Joachim von Ribbentrop and the Foreign Ministry officials at the Wilhelmstrasse.

In Germany, Bose is attached to the Special Bureau for India under Adam von Trott zu Solz which was responsible for broadcasting on the German-sponsored Azad Hind Radio. Bose initiates the Free India Center in Berlin, and created the Indian Legion (consisting of some 4500 soldiers) out of Indian prisoners of war who had previously fought for the British in North Africa prior to their capture by Axis forces. The Indian Legion is attached to the Wehrmacht, and later transferred to the Waffen SS.

Its members swore the following allegiance to Hitler and Bose: "I swear by God this holy oath that I will obey the leader of the German race and state, Adolf Hitler, as the commander of the German armed forces in the fight for India, whose leader is Subhas Chandra Bose". This oath clearly abrogates control of the Indian legion to the German armed forces whilst stating Bose's overall leadership of India. He was also, however, prepared to envisage an invasion of India via the USSR by Nazi troops, spearheaded by the Azad Hind Legion; many question his judgment here, as it seems unlikely that the Germans could have been easily persuaded to leave after such an invasion, which might also have resulted in an Axis victory in the War.

In all, 3,000 Indian prisoners of war sign up for the Free India Legion. But instead of being delighted, Bose was worried. An admirer of Russia, he was devastated when Hitler's tanks rolled across the Soviet border. Matters were worsened by the fact that the now-retreating German army would be in no position to offer him help in driving the British from India. When he meets Hitler in May 1942, his suspicions were confirmed, and he comes to believe that the Nazi leader was more interested in using his men to win propaganda victories than military ones. So, in February 1943, Bose turned his back on his legionnaires and slipped secretly away aboard a submarine bound for Japan. This leaves the men he had recruited leaderless and demoralized in Germany.

Bose lives in Berlin from 1941 until 1943. During his earlier visit to Germany in 1934, he had met Emilie Schenkl, the daughter of an Austrian veterinarian whom he marries in 1937. Their daughter is Anita Bose Pfaff. In 1943, after being disillusioned that Germany could be of any help in gaining India's independence, he leaves for Japan. He travels with the German submarine U-180 around the Cape of Good Hope to the southeast of Madagascar, where he is transferred to the I-29 for the rest of the journey to Imperial Japan, The INA's first commitment was in the Japanese thrust towards Eastern Indian frontiers of Manipur. INA's special forces, the Bahadur Group, are extensively involved in operations behind enemy lines both during the diversionary attacks in Arakan, as well as the Japanese thrust towards Imphal and Kohima, along with the Burmese National Army led by Ba Maw and Aung San.

However, the Japanese Navy remains in essential control of the island's administration. On the Indian mainland, an Indian Tricolor, modeled after that of the Indian National Congress, was raised for the first time in the town in Moirang, in Manipur, in north-eastern India. The towns of Kohima and Imphal were placed under siege by divisions of the Japanese, Burmese National Army and the Gandhi and Nehru Brigades of INA during the attempted invasion of India, also known as Operation U-GO. However, Commonwealth forces held both positions and then counter-attack, in the process inflicting serious losses on the besieging forces, which were then forced to retreat back into Burma.

When the Japanese were defeated at the battles of Kohima and Imphal, the Provisional Government's aim of establishing a base in mainland India was lost forever. The INA was forced to pull back, along with the retreating Japanese army, and fought in key battles against the British Indian Army in its Burma campaign, notably in Meiktilla, Mandalay, Pegu, Nyangyu and Mount Popa. However, with the fall of Rangoon, Bose's government ceases to be an effective political entity. A large proportion of the INA troops surrenders under Lt Col Loganathan. The remaining troops retreated with Bose towards Malaya or made for Thailand. Japan's surrender at the end of the war also leads to the eventual surrender of the Indian National Army, when the troops of the British Indian Army were repatriated to India. On 17 August 1945, Bose leaves from Saigon to Tourane, French Indo-China in the Mitsubishi Ki-21 twin-engine heavy bomber. Subsequently, on 23 August 1945, Reuters announces the death of Bose and General Tsunamasa Shidei of the Japanese Kwantung Army in Japanese-occupied Manchuria. The film ends with the INA trials at Red Fort, the Royal Indian Navy mutiny, and the resulting Indian Independence in 1947.

== Cast ==
- Sachin Khedekar as Subhas Chandra Bose
- Jisshu Sengupta as Sisir Bose
- Kulbhushan Kharbanda as Uttamchand Malhotra
- Rajit Kapur as Abid Hasan
- Divya Dutta as Ila Bose
- Arif Zakaria as Gurbaksh Singh Dhillon
- Ila Arun as Ranu
- Pankaj Berry as Abad Khan
- Narendra Jha as Raja Habib ur Rahman Khan
- Nicolas Chagrin as General Auchinlek
- Rahul Singh as Mohammed Zaman Kiani (Chief of INA)
- Nandini Chatterjee as Meera
- Pradeep Kumar Das as Servant
- Chris England as CID Chief
- Arindham Ghosh as Subhas Chandra Bose's Cousin
- Ahmed Khan as Mian Akbar
- Shakeel Khan as Sarat Bose
- Howard Lee as Governor of Bengal—Sir John Arthur Herbert
- Kunal Mitra as Ashok Bose
- Samiran Mukherjee as Subhas Chandra Bose's Cousin
- Rohan Nichol as CID Officer
- Lal Babu Pandit as Checkpost Policeman
- Zakir Hussain as Shaukat Malik
- Mukul Nag
- Anna Prüstel as Emilie Schenkl
- Florian Panzner as Alexander Werth
- Surendra Rajan as Mahatma Gandhi
- Pratap Sharma as Jawaharlal Nehru
- Charu Rohatgi as Bivabati Devi
- Alokananda Roy as Prabhabati Bose
- Ashiesh Roy as Spy Police 2
- Sonu Sood as Lt. Col. Shah Nawaz Khan
- Vikrant Chaturvedi as Col. Prem Kumar Sahgal
- Rajeshwari Sachdev as Capt. Lakshmi Sehgal
- Udo Schenk as Adolf Hitler
- Bernd-Uwe Reppenhagen as Joachim von Ribbentrop
- Gen Seto as Ambassador Oshima
- Rakesh Shrivastav as Spy Police 1
- Arindam Sil as Jail Warden
- Sandeep Srivastava as Nambiar
- Lalit Tiwari as Checkpost Policeman
- Christian Willis as Jail Superintendent
- Dr.B.D. Mukherjee as Janakinath Bose
- Rajpal Yadav as Bhagat Ram Talwar
- Kelly Dorjee as the Prime Minister Tojo
- Manish Wadhwa as Captain Inayat Gyani
- Anup Shukla as Major Raturi

== Reception ==
Bose: The Forgotten Hero, which offered a controversial view of the life of Bose, sparked protest in India. Director Benegal was forced to cancel its premiere in Kolkata. The film was fiercely opposed by the Forward Bloc party. The party was angry at the film's suggestion that Bose secretly married an Austrian woman, Emilie Schenkl, in 1937, and that he died in a plane crash in Taiwan rather than fleeing to Russia in 1945 as some people believe.

BBC gave 3 stars out of 5 for Netaji Subhas Chandra Bose: The Forgotten Hero. Critic Jaspreet Pandohar called it "an informative and fascinating lesson worth sitting through" and "an absorbing drama." "Benegal is best known for his intimate portraits of Indian women, so it comes as some surprise that his latest film is a biopic of one of India's most famous male icons, Subhas Chandra Bose. Benegal ensures Bose's amazing but complex life story is peppered with just the right amount of detail so as to be easily understood. But what stops this film from becoming a [box-office] hit is its marathon length. At nearly three and a half hours, Sachin Khedekar's gallant performance isn't enough to make this a rousing affair," Pandohar wrote in his analysis.

Sachin Khedekar's portrayal of Bose was praised by critics including Ziya us-Salam of The Hindu newspaper. "Khedekar may not win too many international awards for portraying Bose but accolades in India should come in thick and fast," she wrote in her review. "Benegal may not have put together an epic to challenge the lasting greatness of "Gandhi," Richard Attenborough's tribute to our father of the nation. But nor has he had the advantage of such resources. Where Benegal deserves credit is not in the canvas of his work but the intellectual honesty he has brought to the film. He refrains from either diluting or distorting history to serve his ends." Salam also noted the limitations of a director working under a relatively small budget for a historical film."

== Music ==
Bose: The Forgotten Hero: The Original Motion Picture Soundtrack

Soundtrack album by A. R. Rahman
- Released: 10 December 2004
- Recorded: Panchathan Record Inn; A.M. Studios
- Genre: Soundtrack
- Length: 1:03:23
- Label: Times Music
- Producer: A. R. Rahman

A. R. Rahman chronology
'Swades' (2004)	Bose: The Forgotten Hero: The Original Motion Picture Soundtrack (2004)	'Kisna: The Warrior Poet' (2005)

The highly acclaimed music score that accompanies the film was composed by A. R. Rahman. The soundtrack features 20 pieces composed by Rahman, including 12 instrumentals and orchestral themes, six songs with lyrics by Javed Akhtar and a full orchestral version of Indian National Anthem. Most of the score was conducted by Matt Dunkley and performed by Czech Philharmonic Orchestra. Performers include the Western Choir Chennai (for "Aazadi") and the Mumbai Film Choir ("Hum Dilli Dilli Jayenge").

=== Track listing ===
Song	Duration	Artist(s)
"Aazadi"	4:55	A.R. Rahman, Western Choir Chorus
"Qadam Qadam"	2:48	Vijay Prakash
"Ekla Cholo"	6:05	Nachiketa Chakraborty, Sonu Nigam
"Hum Dilli Dilli Jayenge"	2:49	Mumbai Film Choir
"Desh Ki Mitti"	5:34	Anuradha Sriram, Sonu Nigam
"Zikr (Hasbi Rabbi Jallallah)"	4:44	A R Rahman, Rafee, Raqeeb Alam, Shaukat Ali
"Ghoomparani"	4:25	Sapna Mukherjee, Satyanarayan Mishra
"Durga Pooja – Rhythm"	3:22	Instrumental
"Netaji – Theme 1"	1:22	Instrumental
"Afghanistan – Theme 1"	4:14	Instrumental
"Hitler Theme"	2:10	Instrumental
"Emilie Theme 1"	1:57	Instrumental
"Afghanistan – Theme 2"	1:19	Instrumental
"War Themes"	4:33	Instrumental
"Emilie Theme 2"	2:32	Instrumental
"Qadam Qadam – Orchestral version"	0:52	Instrumental
"Desh Ki Mitti – Orchestral version"	2:48	Instrumental
"U Boat Theme (Underwater battle)"	2:11	Instrumental
"Netaji – Theme 2"	4:44	Instrumental
"Jana Gana Mana (Full Orchestral Version)"	1:15	Instrumental

== Awards ==
National Film Awards 2004

- Nargis Dutt Award for Best Feature Film on National Integration
- National Film Award for Best Art Direction: Samir Chanda

== See also ==
- Indian National Army
- Azad Hind
- List of Asian historical drama films
- List of artistic depictions of Mahatma Gandhi
