= Leonard Gordon =

Leonard Gordon may refer to:

- Leonard Gordon, husband and manager of Puerto Rican actress and singer Rita Moreno
- Leonard A. Gordon, historian of South Asia
