= Emilie Schenkl =

Wife or companion of Indian nationalist Subhas Chandra Bose

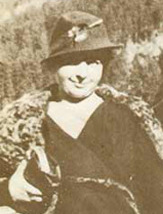
- Schenkl in 1937
- Born: 26 December 1910; Vienna, Austria-Hungary
- Died: 13 March 1996 (aged 85); Vienna, Austria
- Occupation: Stenographer
- Spouse: Subhas Chandra Bose (m. 1937; died 1945) (Note: Gordon comments: "Although we must take Emilie Schenkl at her word (about her secret marriage to Bose in 1937), there are a few nagging doubts about an actual marriage ceremony because there is no document that I have seen and no testimony by any other person. ... Other biographers have written that Bose and Miss Schenkl were married in 1942, while Krishna Bose, implying 1941, leaves the date ambiguous. The strangest and most confusing testimony comes from A. C. N. Nambiar, who was with the couple in Badgastein briefly in 1937, and was with them in Berlin during the war as second-in-command to Bose. In an answer to my question about the marriage, he wrote to me in 1978: 'I cannot state anything definite about the marriage of Bose referred to by you, since I came to know of it only a good while after the end of the last world war ... I can imagine the marriage having been a very informal one ...' ... So what are we left with? ... We know they had a close passionate relationship and that they had a child, Anita, born 29 November 1942, in Vienna. ... And we have Emilie Schenkl's testimony that they were married secretly in 1937. Whatever the precise dates, the most important thing is the relationship.")
- Children: Anita Bose Pfaff

Emilie Schenkl (26 December 1910 – 13 March 1996) was an Austrian stenographer, secretary and trunk exchange operator. She was the wife (or companion) of Subhas Chandra Bose, an Indian nationalist leader.

Schenkl met Bose in 1934, and the two formed a romantic relationship while she worked for him as a secretary. She later became the mother of their daughter Anita Bose Pfaff during Bose's stay in Nazi Germany from 3 April 1941 until 8 February 1943 where Bose sought support from the Nazi leadership for his goals of Indian independence. Following his departure from wartime Europe for Southeast Asia, Schenkl and her baby daughter were left without economic support. (Note: "It may be understandable, even admirable, that Bose made the decision to rank the project of national liberation above his family life at that juncture. However, Bose left Schenkl and their newborn child to fend for themselves in war-time Europe with nothing more than a Bengali letter addressed to his elder brother Sarat, asking him to look after his wife and daughter if he failed to see the end of the journey — a monumental act of irresponsibility as a father if not husband. He had been trying to leave for East Asia since the previous year, and knew of his impending fatherhood much of that time.) Bose, who thereafter tried to oppose British rule in India militarily with support from Imperial Japan, died in a plane crash soon after the Japanese surrender in August 1945.

In 1948, Schenkl and her daughter were met by Bose's brother Sarat Chandra Bose and his family in an emotional meeting in Vienna. In the post-war years, Schenkl worked shifts in the trunk exchange and was the main breadwinner of her family, which included her daughter and her mother.

== Early life ==
Emilie Schenkl was born in Vienna on 26 December 1910 in an Austrian Catholic family. The paternal granddaughter of a shoemaker and the daughter of a veterinarian, she started primary school late—towards the end of the Great War—on account of her father's reluctance for her to have formal schooling. Her father became unhappy with her progress in secondary school and enrolled her in a nunnery for four years.

Schenkl decided against becoming a nun and went back to school, finishing when she was 20. The Great Depression had begun in Europe. Consequently, she was unemployed for a few years.

She was introduced to Bose in June 1934, or sometime thereafter, through a mutual friend, Dr. Mathur, an Indian physician living in Vienna. Bose, nearly 13 years her senior, had arrived there with a contract from a British publisher for writing a book on Indian politics. As Schenkl could take shorthand and her English and typing skills were good, she was hired by Bose. The book became The Indian Struggle. They soon fell in love and were married on 26 December 1937 in Bad Gastein during another visit by Bose in a secret Hindu ceremony, but without a Hindu priest, witnesses, or civil record. Bose went back to India and reappeared in Nazi Germany, living in Berlin during the period April 1941 – February 1943.

== Berlin during the war ==
Sometime after Bose had arrived in Berlin, according to historian Romain Hayes, "the [German] Foreign Office procured a luxurious residence for him along with a butler, cook, gardener, and an SS-chauffeured car. Emilie Schenkl moved in openly with him. The Germans, aware of the nature of the relationship, refrained from any involvement." However, most of the staff in the Special Bureau for India, which had been set up to aid Bose, did not get along with Emilie. In particular Adam von Trott, Alexander Werth and Freda Kretschemer, according to historian Leonard A. Gordon, "appear to have disliked her intensely. They believed that she and Bose were not married and that she was using her liaison with Bose to live an especially comfortable life during the hard times of war" and that differences were compounded by issues of class.

In November 1942, Schenkl gave birth to their daughter. In February 1943, Bose left Schenkl and their baby daughter and boarded a German submarine to travel, via transfer to a Japanese submarine, to Japanese-occupied Southeast Asia. With Japanese support, he formed a Provisional Government of Free India and revamped an army, the Indian National Army, whose goal was to gain India's independence militarily with Japanese help. Bose's effort was unsuccessful. He died in a plane crash in Taihoku (now Taipei), Japanese-held Formosa, now Taiwan, on 18 August 1945, while attempting to escape to the Japanese-held town of Dairen (now Dalian) on the Manchurian peninsula.

== Later life ==
Schenkl and her daughter survived the war with no support or communication from Bose. During their seven years and eight months of marriage, Schenkl and Bose spent less than three years together, putting strains on Schenkl. Bose never publicly acknowledged his marriage and privately did so only in a letter to his brother Sarat written in Bengali and given to Emilie before he left Europe, with instructions for it to be posted to him in the event of his death. (Note: "Bose left Schenkl and their newborn child to fend for themselves in war-time Europe with nothing more than a Bengali letter addressed to his elder brother Sarat, asking him to look after his wife and daughter if he failed to see the end of the journey.)

In the post-war years, Schenkl worked shifts in the trunk exchange and was the main breadwinner of her family, which included her daughter and her mother. Although some family members from Bose's extended family, including his brother Sarat Chandra Bose, welcomed Schenkl and her daughter and met with her in Austria in 1948, Schenkl never visited India. According to her daughter, Schenkl was a very private woman and tight-lipped about her relationship with Bose. She died in 1996.
