= Martin Pfaff =

German economist and politician

Martin Pfaff (born 31 March 1939) is a German economist and politician of the Social Democratic Party of Germany (SPD) who was a member of the Bundestag from 1990 to 2002.

== Early life and education ==
Pfaff was born in Tevel (now in Tolna County, Hungary) on 31 March 1939. After completing high school, he studied in India, graduating with a Bachelor of Commerce degree in 1961. He then studied at the University of Pennsylvania in the United States, earning an MBA in 1963 and PhD in economics. During his student years he was a staff member and honorary treasurer of two schools for blind children in India, from 1958 to 1962.

== Academic career ==
From 1965 to 1974, Pfaff worked as a university lecturer and professor at various universities in the United States. Since 1971 he has also held an economics chair at the University of Augsburg. He was founder and scientific director of the International Institute for Empirical Social Economics (INIFES), a socioeconomic research center based in Stadtbergen, near Augsburg. He has authored and edited several books and monograph and numerous articles on economic and social policy.

== Political career ==
In 1976 Pfaff became a member of the local branch of the SPD in Hochfeld, and he soon became a local party leader for Swabia. He became a member of the Association of the Social Democrats for Health Care (ASG) and in 1994, National Chairman of the ASG. In 1990, Pfaff was elected to the Bundestag, where he served three terms of office, until 2002.

== Personal life ==
He is married to Anita Bose Pfaff (born 1942), also an economics professor, and the daughter of Indian nationalist Subhas Chandra Bose. They have three children: Peter Arun, Thomas Krishna, and Maya Carina.
