= Anita Bose Pfaff =

German economist and politician

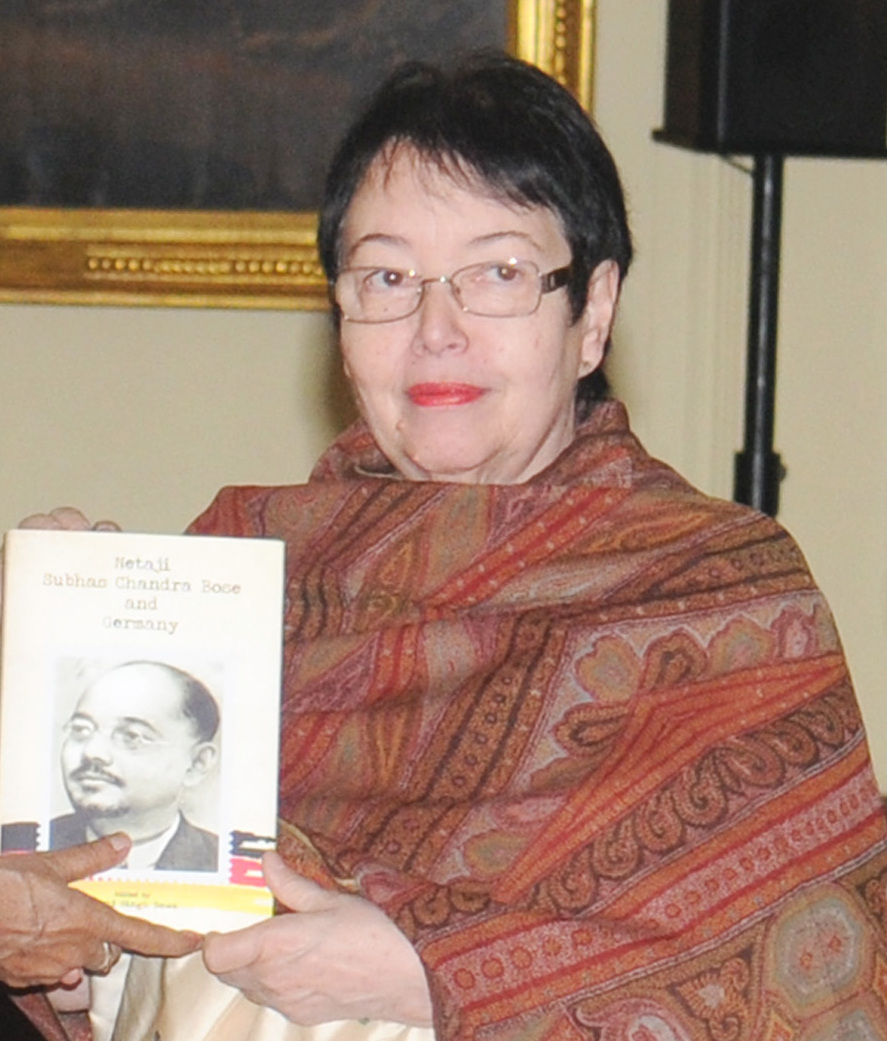
- Bose Pfaff in February 2013.
- Born: Anita Schenkl; 29 November 1942 (age 83); Vienna, Nazi Germany (present-day Austria)
- Spouse: Martin Pfaff
- Children: 3
- Parents: Subhas Chandra Bose; Emilie Schenkl

Anita Bose Pfaff (née Schenkl, born 29 November 1942) is an Austrian economist, who has previously been a professor at the University of Augsburg as well as a politician in the Social Democratic Party of Germany. She is the daughter of Indian nationalist Subhas Chandra Bose and his wife, (Note: "While writing The Indian Struggle, Bose also hired a secretary by the name of Emilie Schenkl. They eventually fell in love and married secretly in accordance with Hindu rites.") or companion, (Note: "Although we must take Emilie Schenkl at her word (about her secret marriage to Bose in 1937), there are a few nagging doubts about an actual marriage ceremony because there is no document that I have seen and no testimony by any other person. ... Other biographers have written that Bose and Miss Schenkl were married in 1942, while Krishna Bose, implying 1941, leaves the date ambiguous. The strangest and most confusing testimony comes from A. C. N. Nambiar, who was with the couple in Badgastein briefly in 1937, and was with them in Berlin during the war as second-in-command to Bose. In an answer to my question about the marriage, he wrote to me in 1978: 'I cannot state anything definite about the marriage of Bose referred to by you, since I came to know of it only a good while after the end of the last world war ... I can imagine the marriage having been a very informal one ...'... So what are we left with? ... We know they had a close passionate relationship and that they had a child, Anita, born 29 November 1942, in Vienna. ... And we have Emilie Schenkl's testimony that they were married secretly in 1937. Whatever the precise dates, the most important thing is the relationship.") Emilie Schenkl. (Note: "Apart from the Free India Centre, Bose also had another reason to feel satisfied-even comfortable-in Berlin. After months of residing in a hotel, the Foreign Office procured a luxurious residence for him along with a butler, cook, gardener and an SS-chauffeured car. Emilie Schenkl moved in openly with him. The Germans, aware of the nature of their relationship, refrained from any involvement. The following year she gave birth to a daughter.)

== Early life ==
Pfaff is the only child of Emilie Schenkl and Subhas Chandra Bose, who—with a view to attempting an armed attack on the British Indian Empire with the help of Imperial Japan—left Schenkl and Pfaff in Europe, and moved to southeast Asia, when Pfaff was four months old. Pfaff was raised by her mother, who worked shifts in a telephone trunk office during the postwar years to support the family, which included Pfaff's maternal grandmother. Pfaff was not given her father's last name at birth, and grew up as Anita Schenkl.

== Academic career ==
As of 2012, Pfaff was a professor of economics at the University of Augsburg.

== Marriage and family ==
Pfaff is married to Professor Martin Pfaff, who was previously a member of the Bundestag (the German parliament), representing the SPD. They have three children: Peter Arun, Thomas Krishna and Maya Carina.

== Media ==
Pfaff is mentioned in the Bollywood film Netaji Subhas Chandra Bose: The Forgotten Hero.
