= Subhasji (song) =

Indian song

"Subhasji", also known as "Subhasji Subhasji" or "Subhasji Subhasji Woh Jane Hind Aa Gaye", is a Hindi language inspirational song dedicated to prominent Indian freedom fighter Netaji Subhas Chandra Bose. It was a welcoming song when Bose came back to Singapore on 3 July 1943. It was composed by the soldiers of Azad Hind Fauj (Resident Indians of East Asia).

This song was featured in 2019 Bengali language film Gumnaami, directed by Srijit Mukherji.
