= Netaji Stadium =

Stadium in Sri Vijaya Puram, India

- Gymkhana Club Ground
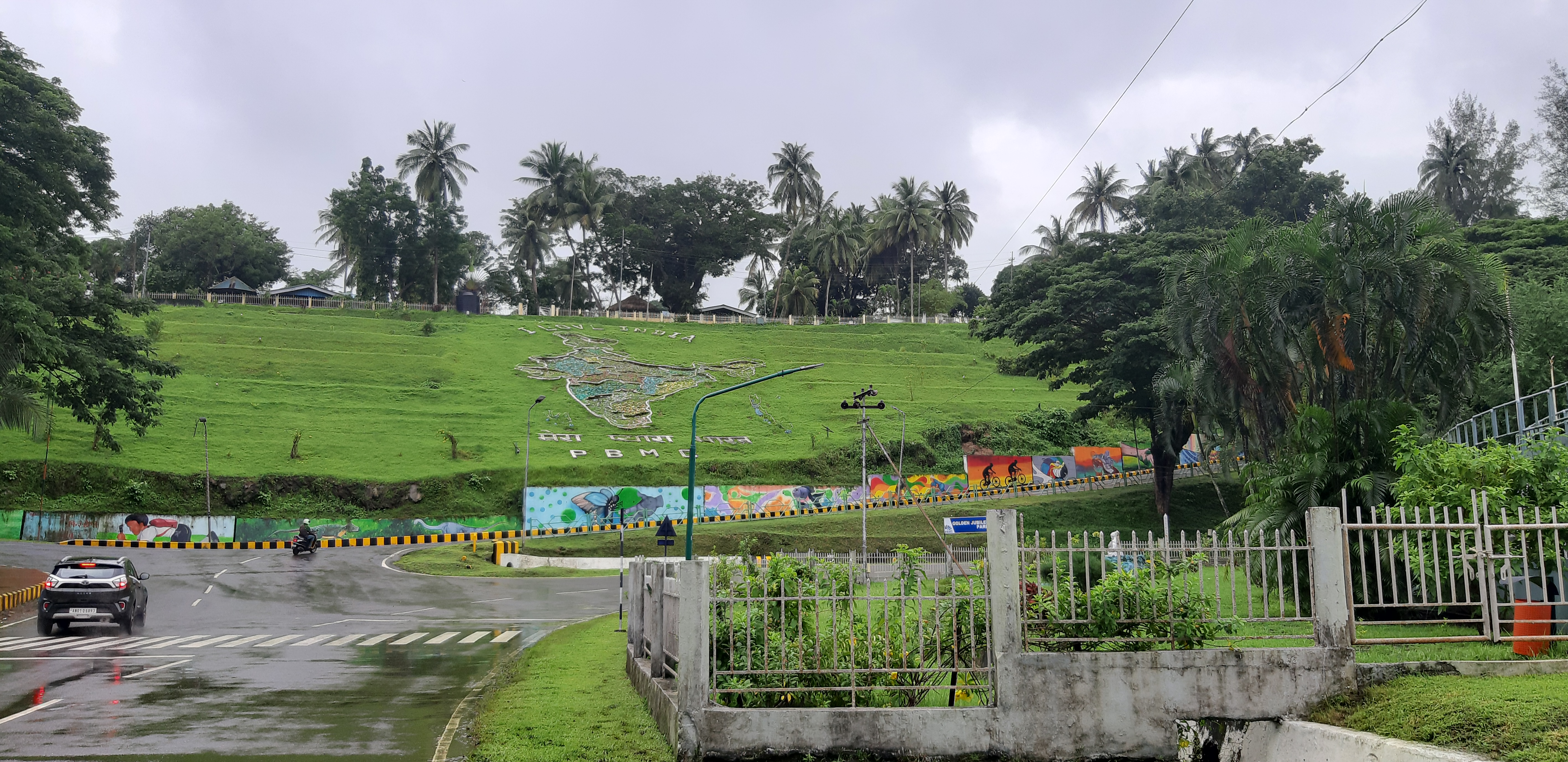
- Interactive map of Netaji Stadium

Ground information
- Location: Sri Vijaya Puram, Andaman and Nicobar Islands
- Country: India
- Coordinates: 11°40′10″N 92°44′46″E
- Capacity: n/a
- End names
- Medical end College end

Team information
Andaman and Nicobar football team
- As of 31 July 2015; Source: Ground profile

Netaji Stadium is a multi-purpose stadium in Sri Vijaya Puram, Andaman and Nicobar Islands. The stadium hosts the major local football and cricket matches, and other public events.

There were proposals for an international level cricket stadium to be constructed in these islands where a few Ranji Trophy matches could be organized to begin with simultaneously the Andaman & Nicobar Cricket Association need be formed and affiliated and registered with BCCI in tune with other state associations.
