= Andaman and Nicobar Cricket Association =

Sports organisation of Andaman and Nicobar Islands, India

The Cricket Association Andaman & Nicobar (CAAN) are sports organizations in Andaman and Nicobar Islands. Neither is affiliated with the Board of Control for Cricket in India.
