= Special Bureau for India =

Nazi Germany Foreign Office section

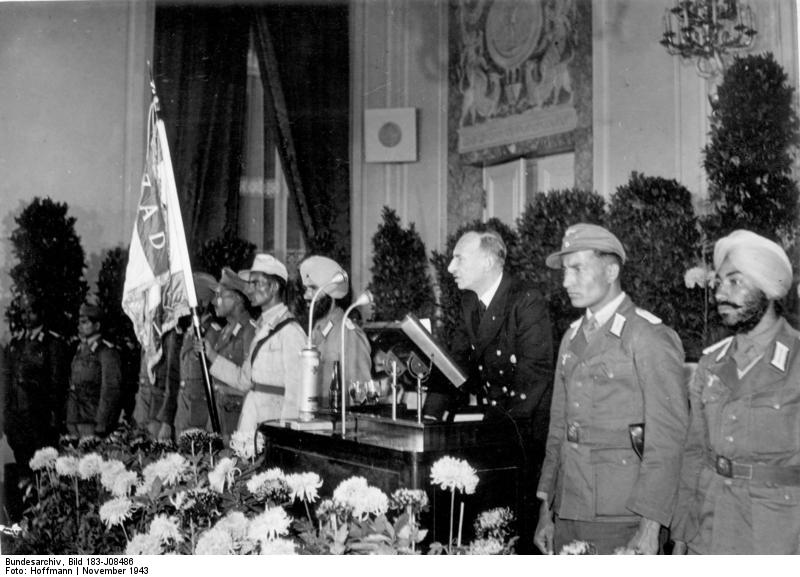
The director of the Special Bureau for India, and Secretary of State, Wilhelm Keppler, conveying "the greeting of German foreign minister Joachim Ribbentrop" at a function in Hotel Kaiserhof on 18 November 1943.

Sonderreferat Indien, variously translated into English as, Special Bureau for India, Special India Bureau, or Section for Indian Affairs, was a section or bureau established within the Information Department of the Foreign Office of Nazi Germany in late spring 1941 in response to a proposal or memorandum written by the Indian nationalist Subhas Chandra Bose, who had arrived in Germany in early April of that year. The main function of the bureau was to aid Bose in his work, to liaise with Bose, and to mobilize an Indian Legion, comprising Indian prisoners of war captured by Erwin Rommel's Afrika Korps, to aid the German military in a future land invasion of India. A military intervention in India, one of the two major points in Bose's proposal, had at first received a lukewarm response from the German Foreign Minister Joachim von Ribbentrop, but shortly afterwards it received the unexpected support of Adolf Hitler, who saw the battle for India as the natural aftermath of a successful German invasion of Russia and a chance to deliver the ultimate blow to the British Empire.

Wilhelm Keppler, then an under-secretary of State in the German Foreign Office, who had direct access to Ribbentrop, was appointed director of the bureau. Most of the day-to-day work, however, became the responsibility of Adam von Trott zu Solz, an anti-Nazi official, who had some knowledge of India. Immediately under von Trott was his longtime friend Alexander Werth, who earlier had been imprisoned by the Nazis for a few years, along with ten other remaining members of staff. Bose was required to be addressed as "His Excellency" by order of the senior officials in the Foreign Office.

In time, the bureau became a refuge for anti-Nazis, especially von Trott himself, who used his position as a cover for his "clandestine activities abroad." Von Trott travelled to "Switzerland, Turkey, Scandinavia and throughout Nazi-occupied Europe" ostensibly on Special Bureau business, but in actuality attempting to reach out to German military officers opposing Nazi policies, and in the process risking his life. Von Trott would be executed by the Nazis in 1944. Bose was probably not aware of von Trott's anti-Nazi work, in part because Bose and von Trott did not develop a personal friendship or mutual trust, though some later scholars attempted to portray Bose as an anti-Nazi by suggesting a friendship. According to the historian Leonard A. Gordon, von Trott, "... feeling that Bose did not understand the Nazi tyranny and how it was destroying what was best in the German tradition, ... withheld his deeper sympathy and intimate friendship from Bose."
