= Leonard A. Gordon =

American historian

Leonard Abraham Gordon is an American historian of South Asia, especially of Bengal, whose 1990 book Brothers Against the Raj: A Biography of Indian Nationalist Leaders Sarat and Subhas Chandra Bose is considered the definitive biography of Subhas Chandra Bose.

== Education and career ==
Gordon graduated from Amherst College, and received his Ph.D. from Harvard University. He was a professor of history at Brooklyn College, City University of New York, and has emeritus status there now. He was also the director of the Southern Asia Institute at Columbia University.

Gordon's revised Harvard dissertation, Bengal: the Nationalist Movement won the (now discontinued) biennial Watumull Prize of the American Historical Association in 1974, a prize recognizing "the best book on the history of India originally published in the United States." Gordon has been praised for his "narration of political events."

== Bibliography ==
- Gordon, Leonard A.; Miller, Barbara Stoler (1971), A Syllabus of Indian Civilization, New York: Columbia University Press
- Gordon, Leonard A. (January 1974), Bengal: the Nationalist Movement, 1876–1940, New York: Columbia University Press, ISBN 978-0-231-03753-2
- Gordon, Leonard A. (1990), Brothers Against the Raj: A Biography of Indian Nationalist Leaders Sarat and Subhas Chandra Bose, New York: Columbia University Press, ISBN 978-0-231-07383-7

== See also ==
- Joyce Lebra
- Peter W. Fay
- Death of Subhas Chandra Bose
