= A. C. N. Nambiar =

Indian Nationalist and friend and colleague of Subhas Chandra Bose

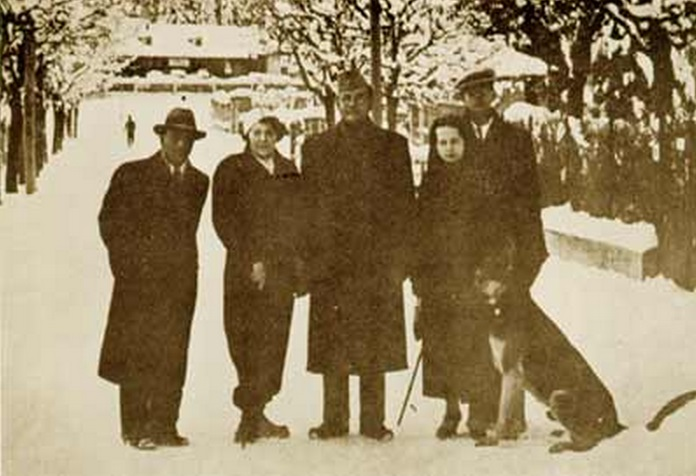
- l.t.r.: A. C. N. Nambiar, Heidi Fülöp-Miller, Subhas Chandra Bose, Emilie Schenkl and Amiya Bose, Bad Gastein, Austria, December 1937

Ambassador of India to Germany
- In office 1955–1958
- Preceded by: Subimal Dutt

Personal details
- Born: 1896
- Died: 17 January 1986 (aged 89–90)
- Spouse: Suhasini Chattopadhyay (m. 1919, divorced)
- Occupation: Journalist, diplomat
- Awards: Padma Bhushan (1958)

Arathil Candeth Narayanan Nambiar (1896 – 17 January 1986) was an Indian Nationalist and a friend and colleague of Subhas Chandra Bose. Originally from Thalassery, Kannur, Kerala, Nambiar spent much of his life serving the Indian independence movement in Europe.

== Biography ==
=== Early life ===
A. C. Narayanan Nambiar was the fourth son of writer Vengayil Kunhiraman Nayanar and Arathil Candeth Kallyani Amma. Narayanan belongs to the Arathil Candeth family through matrilineal succession. His nephew is K. P. Candeth, a Lieutenant General in the Indian Army and first Governor of Goa.

He married Suhasini Chattopadhyay, the sister of Sarojini Naidu, and the first woman Communist member of India in 1919. Later they separated.

=== Europe ===
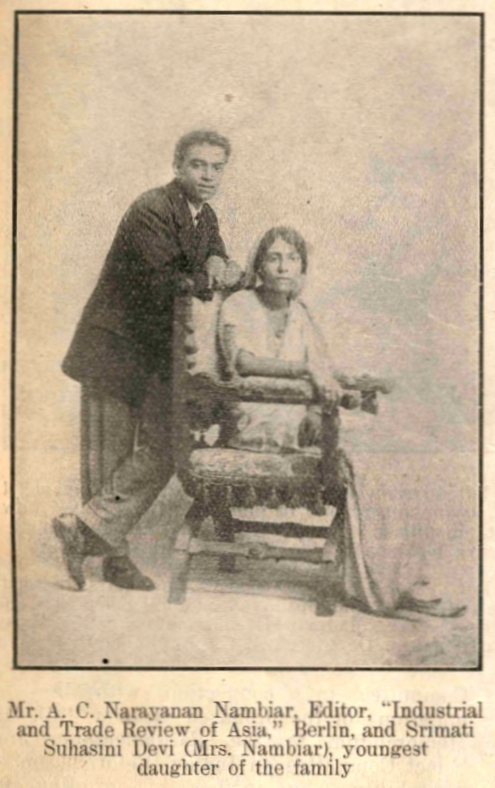

Nambiar had been working in Europe as a left-wing journalist for some time when the Second World War broke out. In the 1930s he had been beaten up by Nazi stormtroopers, imprisoned, and then deported, at first to Prague. At the outbreak of war he was working in Paris.

According to MI5 documents that remained classified until 2014, the British believed Nambiar was a Soviet spy before the war. The documents show that a Soviet defector in the 1950s said Nambiar had been an agent of the GRU in the 1920s. Nambiar had visited Moscow in 1929 while active in Indian communist organisations. (The declassified documents also included correspondence between Nambiar and Bose captured after the surrender of German submarine U-234.)

In January 1942 he joined the Free India Centre as second in command to Bose. This organisation was set up by Bose to promote Indian independence and to assist the enemies of the British Empire, namely Nazi Germany, the Empire of Japan, and the other Axis powers. Nambiar was a reluctant recruit; his anti-Nazi politics put him in an uncomfortable position, but he finally succumbed to Bose's persuasiveness and moved to Berlin. Nambiar established a branch of the Free India Centre in Paris before leaving. The Berlin Centre was given the status of a foreign mission by Germany and ran a propaganda radio station. It also controlled and recruited the Indian Legion. This had been founded by Bose and was mainly recruited from Indian prisoners of war and officered by Germans. It was originally intended to use it to fight the British in India, but it was eventually deployed to defend the French coast. It was never a significant military force, never consisting of more than a few thousand men.

In January 1943 Bose secretly transferred by submarine to the Japanese theatre of war, leaving Nambiar in charge in Germany. There was more potential there for recruitment to Bose's cause amongst Indian prisoners; large numbers had been taken in the Fall of Singapore. The attitude of Bose and Nambiar towards Nazi Germany slowly transformed from seeing it as a convenient way of obtaining material support for their cause to believing that German victory was essential for them to succeed. As a consequence, they more and more accepted use of the Legion in the German cause as opposed to exclusively in India. In April Nambiar had to deal with a mutiny in the Legion, who were reluctant to move to the Netherlands as ordered. They had believed they would be fighting in India or somewhere from where they could attack towards India such as North Africa. By August the Centre's operations became severely disrupted by Allied bombing and Nambiar's own house was destroyed. Most activity was moved out of Berlin, but Nambiar remained there as Bose's official representative. In March 1944 Nambiar was appointed Minister of State in Bose's Provisional Government.

In August 1943 the Legion, now with a strength of three battalions, was moved from the Netherlands to Bordeaux where they found the climate more agreeable. However, as the threat of Allied invasion started to loom morale severely deteriorated. In a tour in April and May 1944 Nambiar concluded that morale could only be improved by action. He persuaded the reluctant German commander of the Legion (Lieutenant Colonel Krappe) to allow a small contingent into action as an experiment. The 9th Company was sent to Italy, where some Legion personnel were already being used in intelligence and propaganda roles. The experiment was a complete failure. They were positioned opposite a Polish force. The initial reconnaissance party immediately deserted, followed by the entire company refusing to go into action on the grounds that the Poles were not their enemy.

=== Post-war ===
Nambiar was imprisoned after the war for collaboration with the enemy. He escaped to Switzerland and, against the wishes of Britain, was given an Indian passport by Nehru's Interim Government. He then worked as a counsellor at the Indian Legation in Berne. He was appointed Indian ambassador to Scandinavia, then, in 1955 he was appointed the second Indian Ambassador to the Federal Republic of Germany, succeeding Subimal Dutt. He was awarded the Padma Bhushan in 1958. Nambiar finished his career as European correspondent of the Hindustan Times.
