= Propaganda and India in World War II =

Flag of the Indian Legion, led by Subhas Chandra Bose

Throughout World War II, both the Axis and Allied sides used propaganda to sway the opinions of Indian civilians and troops, while at the same time Indian nationalists applied propaganda both within and outside India to promote the cause of Indian independence.

== Allied Propaganda in India ==
=== British Propaganda in India ===
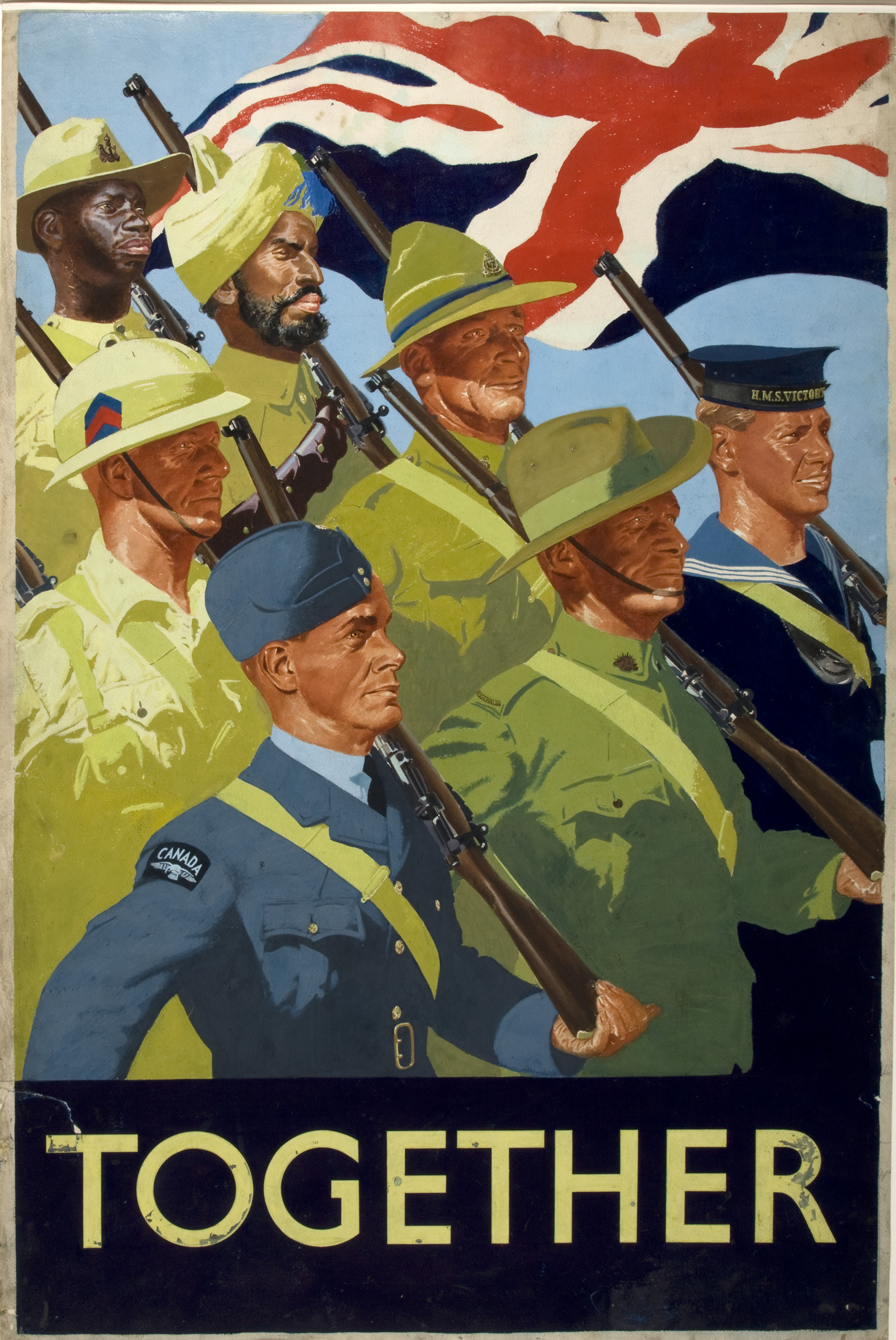
INF 3/318 Unity of Strength Together (British Empire servicemen)

The Far Eastern Bureau was responsible for all overt propaganda in India, and for the printing of leaflets and newspapers to be disseminated there. Front line propaganda to Indian soldiers was carried out by the General Headquarters of India (GHQ).

The majority of British propaganda was disseminated through newspaper, radio, and printed news sheets and leaflets. One news sheet was titled the "Hamara Hindustan" and was a four-page weekly newspaper with stories of progress in the war in Europe and Asia, as well as maps and images. This paper was printed in Urdu, and first disseminated in early 1944 by GHQ, India. Many of the leaflets and newspapers were particularly focused at Indian troops towards the end of the war.

== Axis Propaganda in India ==
=== German Propaganda in India ===
At the beginning of World War II, the Germans were hesitant to get involved with India as it was part of the British Empire. Subhas Chandra Bose was the main impetus for the Germans and the Axis powers to launch propaganda campaigns there. Bose was a prominent Indian nationalist leader who had sought the help of the Axis powers during World War II in hopes of gaining independence from the British. With the help of the Nazis, Bose created a radio station called Azad Hind Radio, or Free India Radio. Bose's first statement on Azad Hind Radio came on February 28, 1942. The main theme of this broadcast was anti-British and pro-Nationalist, including statements such as "For other nations, British imperialism may be the enemy of today, but for India, it is the eternal foe….Standing at one of the crossroads of world history, I solemnly declare on behalf of all freedom-loving Indians in India and abroad, that we shall continue to fight British imperialism till India is once again the mistress of her destiny. During this struggle, and in the reconstruction that will follow, we shall heartily co-operate with all those who will help us in overthrowing the common enemy….The hour of India’s salvation is at hand." Following this broadcast, Joseph Goebbels, Reich Minister of Propaganda, wrote "We shall now begin our official fight on behalf of India." The broadcasts were repeatedly aired on Axis radio stations around the world, and to at least a dozen Axis stations in India. Bose continued to broadcast on Azad Hind Radio, focusing mainly on Indian independence and anti-British and anti-Allied themes.

Aside from Bose, Germany built upon whatever sympathy there was for their ideas, particularly in Bengal. The Germans had Hitler's book, Mein Kampf, translated into all the major Indian languages to spread their beliefs. They also mailed pro-Nazi literature to publications and German clubs.

=== Japanese Propaganda in India ===
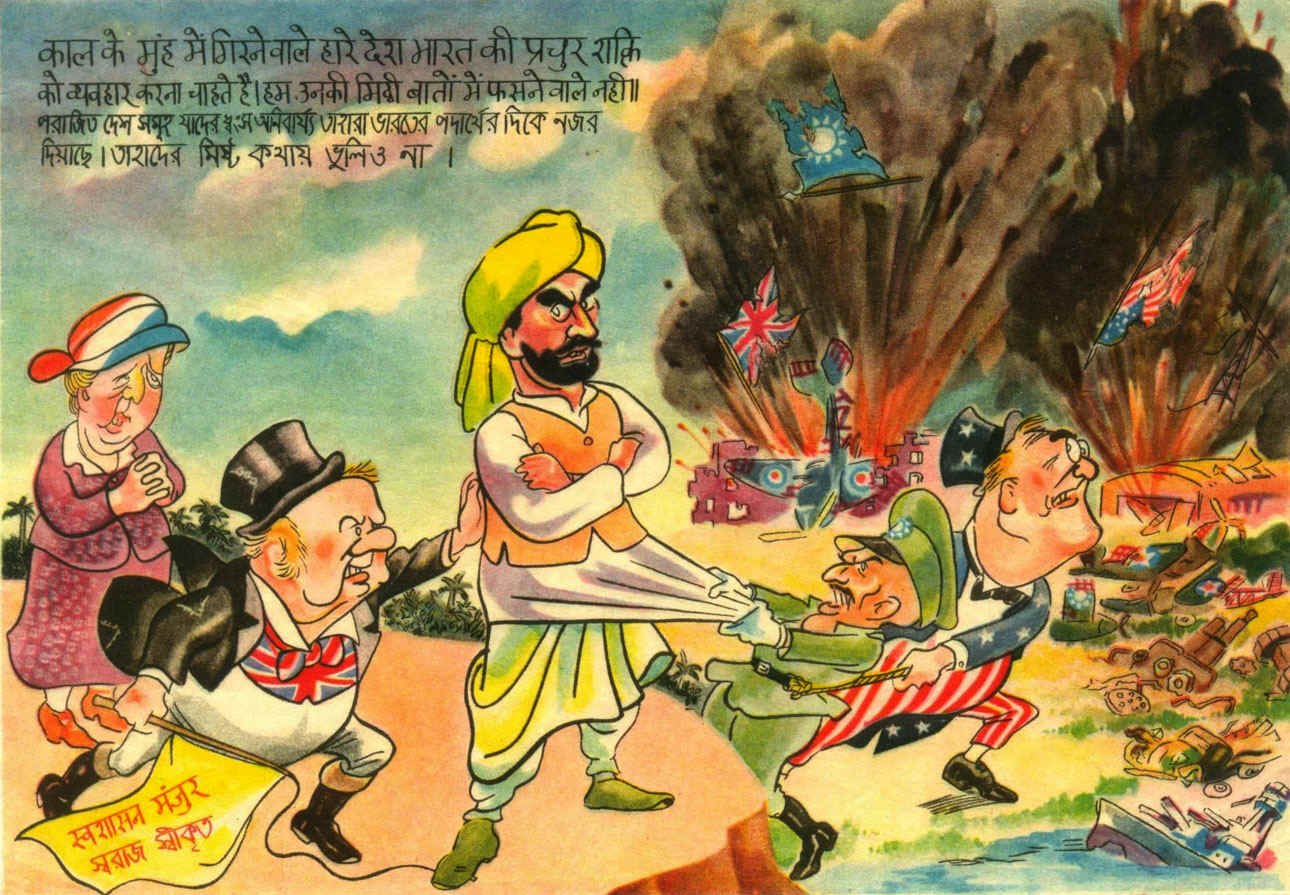
Japanese propaganda leaflet depicting Allied leaders such as Roosevelt, Chiang Kai-shek and Churchill trying to push or pull an Indian into the fight against the Japanese, 1943

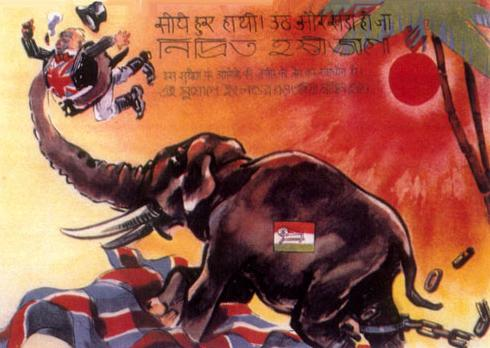
Leaflet depicting an Indian elephant with the INA symbol lifting John Bull high over its head.

The Japanese regarded India as a potential part of their Greater East-Asian Co-Prosperity Sphere, and planned from early in the war to subvert Indian troops. They wanted a pro-Indian independence organisation in place by the time they attacked the United States, and aided in the creation of the Indian National Army (INA). When creating the INA, the Japanese agreed to whole-hearted aid, cooperation, and alliance. The Japanese considered Subhas Chandra Bose as the probable leader for the INA.

Japanese propaganda to Indian troops was accomplished primarily through leaflets and radio. Leaflets distributed to Indian troops, particularly along the border region, asked them to join the Japanese and help liberate India. A “Free India” radio station was installed in Saigon, encouraging the Indians to launch an anti-colonial revolution while the British were weak and occupied elsewhere. “Indian Independence” transmitters were also set up in Bangkok and Singapore, as was an “Indian Muslim Station.”

== Outside India ==
=== British Propaganda against Indian Troops ===
The main purpose of British propaganda aimed at Indian troops was to maintain Indian morale and to counter Axis propaganda. To counter the Axis propaganda leaflets dropped on Indian troops, the British government developed a propaganda campaign involving leaflets and radio broadcasts for Indian troops who had joined the Germans and Japanese. The leaflet campaign was particularly successful, with many Indian soldiers fighting against the British surrendering as a result of the leaflets. In 1944, the leaflet campaign rose to 1.5 million leaflets a month dropped on Indian National Army soldiers who had been fighting for the Axis. Many leaflets were distributed guaranteeing safe passage for Indians fighting against the Allies who surrendered, and warning of the dangers of collaborating with the enemy.

The British also influenced those Indian troops fighting with the Japanese by playing Japanese music over loudspeakers along with reports of Japanese defeats, and calls to desert. In leaflets, the British used rumours and innuendos to demoralise Indian troops aligned with the Japanese.

=== Axis propaganda against Indian Troops ===
The Nazi authorities designed a number of propaganda leaflets targeting Indians troops which they dropped behind Allied lines during the war. Common themes in these leaflets included claims that Indian troops were being used as cannon fodder, promoting division between British officers and the Indian troops under their command, and encouraging Indian troops to desert to the Axis side. These leaflets were distributed in many of the languages of the Indian subcontinent.

=== Anti-Indian Nationalist propaganda in the United States ===
After the start of World War II, America was opposed to and suspicious of foreign propaganda. This did not stop Great Britain from conducting an ongoing propaganda campaign in the United States regarding India.

As a former colony of the British Empire, America was automatically sympathetic to calls for Indian independence. From mid-1941, President Roosevelt exerted constant pressure on Prime Minister Churchill to reach a political settlement with India. Pressure also came from the Indian National Congress party, China, and the Labour Party in Britain.

British propaganda regarding India in the United States was aimed at convincing President Franklin Delano Roosevelt that there was no viable alternative.

The campaign was started in 1942. Starting in January 1942, the British Embassy in Washington, D.C., as well as British and Indian Government sources, released propaganda material to the American press. This propaganda was launched particularly in preparation for the announcement of the Cripps’ Offer, an apparently unconditional proposal for Indian self-rule. The British propaganda placed in American papers regarding the offer gave the impression that Indian nationalists would turn it down.

Themes in the propaganda campaign included:

- British expertise on India
- Britain's record in India and historical links to the country
- The complexities of Indian society
- The idea that there was no alternative to British rule for India
- British responsibility to India and its people
- Britain's effort to give India a measure of self-government
- Discrediting of the Indian nationalist leadership, particularly characterising leaders such as Nehru as either naïve politicians and thinkers or as potentially viable leaders held in thrall and misled by Mohandas Karamchand Gandhi
- Discrediting of Mohandas Karamchand Gandhi

Methods of dispersing propaganda included using the American media to disperse anti-Indian ideas, publishing or subsidising the publishing of anti-Indian nationalist books, and influencing important political leaders, including President Roosevelt, who had a long relationship with Prime Minister Churchill.

One outcome of the British propaganda campaign in the United States was a backlash against Britain following its suppression of the Gandhi-inspired Quit India movement. Ultimately, the campaign was not successful because American public opinion was in favor of Indian independence.

=== Indian nationalist propaganda in the United States ===
Indian nationalist leaders challenged Britain's propaganda regarding India in the United States primarily through the publication of pamphlets, magazines, articles in newspapers and events. The biggest monthly pamphlet was titled “India Today” and was published by the India League of America. This pamphlet was an opportunity to disseminate the pro-independence arguments of the nationalist Indian Congress Party, and in particular the leader Jawaharlal Nehru. The India League of America also published some broadsheets in 1942, with titles such as “India: Her position in a changing world,” “Storm over India,” and “Can Indians get together?” These publications did not significantly impact American public opinion. A full-page advertisement sponsored by the India League and placed in the Washington Post on May 19, 1943 stressed that “The Time For Mediation is NOW” and listed the names of influential Americans who supported Indian independence, and provided reasons for why it was important.

The India League also held events, including rallies in New York, Boston and Washington, D.C.

The pro-India movement also disseminated its ideas in various publications, primarily in the magazine, Voice of India, and through articles written by sympathetic journalists and academics.

== See also ==
- India in World War II
- British propaganda during World War II
- Japanese propaganda during World War II
- Indian National Army
- Subhas Chandra Bose
