= Mohammad Iqbal Shedai =

Activist who supported Indian independence

Dr. Muhammad Iqbal Shedai
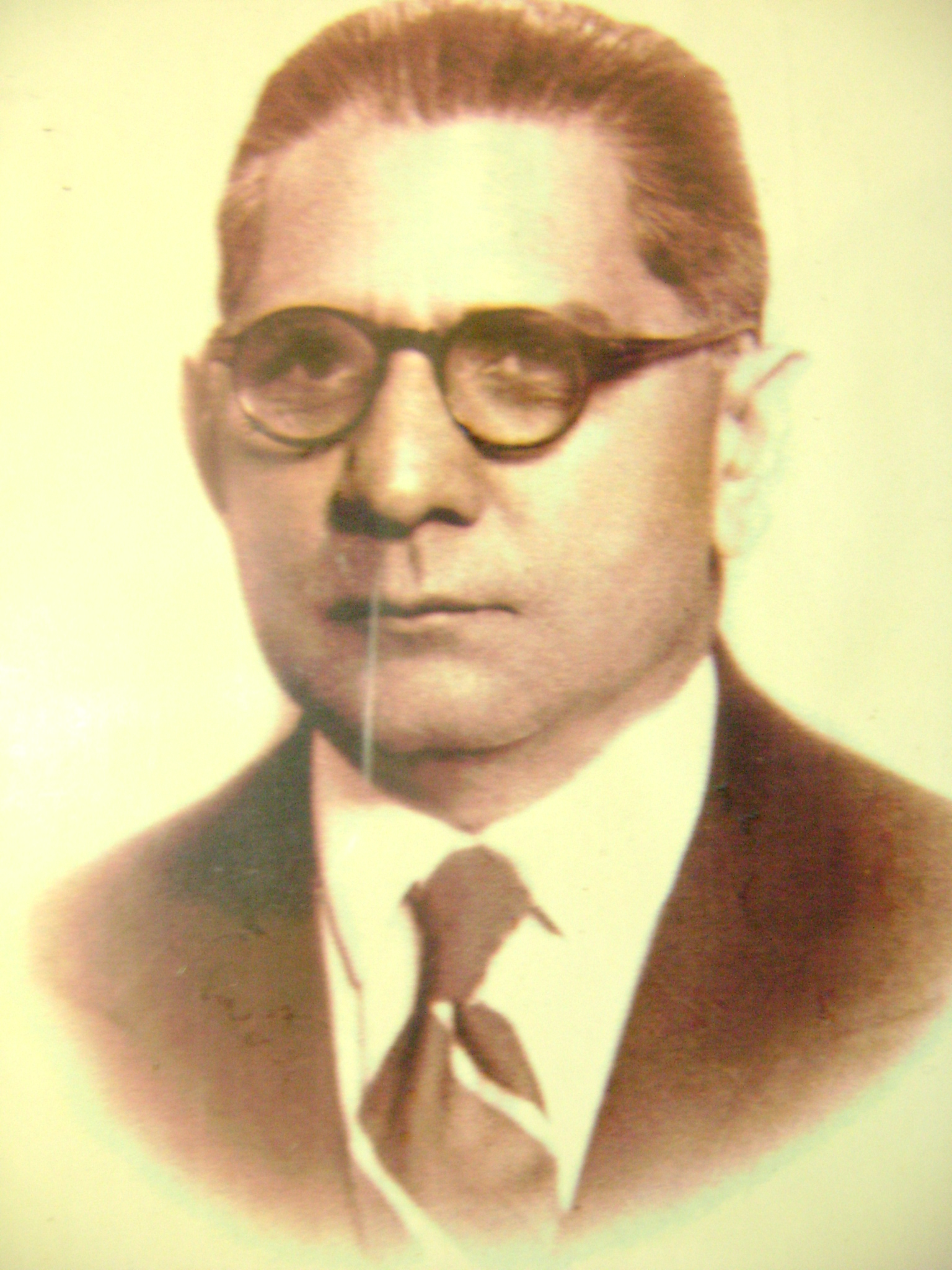
- Born: November 1888; Pura Hairanwala, Sialkot, British Raj
- Died: 13 January 1974 (aged 85-86); Lahore, Punjab, Pakistan
- Occupations: Writer, activist
- Spouse: Bilquis

Mohammad Iqbal Shedai (Punjabi: محمد اقبال شیدائ) was a British Indian and later Pakistani activist who espoused independence for India and opposition to British colonial policies. He spent most of his life in self-exile in Asian and European countries.

== Early life ==
One of eleven children, Shedai was born as Muhammad Iqbal Shedai in 1888 in Pura Hairanwala, Sialkot, British India (now Pakistan), into a Punjabi Muslim family belonging to the Rajput-Bhutta caste, to Chaudhary Ghulam Ali Bhutta, who taught science, mathematics and English at the Scotch Mission School and whose students included Muhammad Iqbal. He graduated from Sialkot's Murray College but wasn't accepted in Lahore's Law College as he was considered to be too anti-British.

== Political activism ==
Shedai's political involvement began in 1914 when he joined Maulana Muhammad Ali Jouhar and Maulana Shaukat Ali in their organization "Anjuman Khadam-e-Kaaba" (society of the servants of the Kaaba). Soon he became a "Shedai-e-Kaaba", one of only nine in India.

In 1915, Shedai went to Hoti, Mardan, now in Pakistan, to work as a teacher in the local government school. However, he was soon expelled from N.W.F.P. for what the authorities considered to be anti-British actions. In August 1915 Shedai's movements were restricted to Pura Hairanwala in Sialkot. In October 1915, the Deputy Commissioner of Sialkot removed those restrictions. In 1916, Shedai tried to enroll in the law college in Lahore, but the Principal refused him admission, supposedly due to Shedai's political activism.

=== Ghadr Party and Hijrat Movement ===
In 1918, Shedai joined the Hindustan Ghadr Party, which stood for Indian independence and soon became one of its top leaders.

In early 1920, the Hijrat Movement of protest emigration started. Maulana Muhammad Ali Jouhar and Maulana Shaikh Abdul Majeed Sindhi declared India as a "Darul Harab (house of war)" and exhorted Muslims to migrate to Afghanistan.

With an introductory letter from Maulana Jouhar, Shedai started his trip to Afghanistan. He travelled to Haripur where he was joined by Akbar Qureshi. After Shedai arrived in Kabul, Amanullah Khan appointed Shedai as his Minister for Indian refugees. During his tenure there, Shedai was reportedly distressed at the poverty and deprivation faced by Indians who had migrated to Afghanistan.

=== Visits to Moscow and Ankara ===
Shedai and Akbar Qureshi then decided to visit Moscow to study the socialism of the Russian Bolshevik Party. At that time, both men decided to work for the spread of socialism worldwide. After returning to Kabul, Qureshi went back to Haripur while Shedai went to Ankara, Turkey.

During his visit to Turkey, Shedai met with Mustafa Kemal Atatürk, the first President of the Turkish Republic and İsmet İnönü, the first Prime Minister. Both Turkish leaders expressed bitterness against Muslims of the Indian Army who had fought against the Ottoman Empire during World War I.

=== Collaboration with Italy ===
In 1933, Shedai became an advisor to the Italian Foreign Ministry on propaganda efforts targeted at Muslims in India and the Middle East. The Italians gave Shedai facilities and funding to conduct propaganda campaigns.

With the beginning of World War II, Shedai and Ajit Singh established Radio Himalaya. Using a shortwave radio station in Rome, Shedai made daily broadcasts to Indians (many of whom thought he was broadcasting from India).

Shedai became a dangerous rival for Netaji Subhas Chandra Bose for influence with the Italians. His position was described by Trott, who met him in 1941. He wrote: "The driving force in the entire Indian and partly in the oriental activities of the Italian External Ministry is the Indian Iqbal Shedai, who is known in Berlin. He enjoys the fullest confidence of all Italian authorities concerned".

In 1941, Shedai established the Azad Hind Government, an exile government for an independent India, in Rome. Shedai was appointed as the president of this government. Sardar Ajit Singh was Shedai's Minister of Information and Broadcasting.

In early 1942, Shedai served with the Fascist regime as a political commissar and consultant for the Battaglione Azad Hindoustan. The unit was recruited from Indian POWs captured by the Royal Italian Army. However, the unit never saw combat; it was dissolved later in 1942 after a mutiny.

In 1944, Shedai fled Rome to Milan to avoid capture by the Allied armies.

==== Shedai and Bose meetings in Italy ====
Martello's book dwells at length on the rivalry that developed in Italy and Germany between the endeavours of Chandra Bose and Mohammed Iqbal Shedai to further attention and support towards the Indian cause. In fact, partly because of Netaji's choice to give priority to seeking German support (in consideration of its stronger position within the Axis) Iqbal's position in Italy became gradually more important, so as to become the principal point of reference to Italy's Eastern policy. Of course, Chandra Bose kept good contacts and support of friends in the Italian Foreign Office, but Foreign Minister Ciano gradually showed mistrust towards Netaji and Italy's policy, in general, grew more and more supportive (because of its interest in courting Arab support in the Middle East) of the Muslim element in the struggle for Indian independence. Martelli records the Bose-Shedai misunderstandings and growing rivalry in detailed reports of their meetings in Italy in May–June 1941. A common, persuasive support by both on the need of a clear statement of support to India's independence by the Axis emerged from a German-Italian policy meeting in December 1941 to which Chandra Bose, Shedai and Gulam Siddiq Khan were invited to represent India's interests. According to reports, the conclusion of the meeting showed that the result of the common proddings was only a German commitment to try to have Hitler-Ribbentrop reconsider their cautious attitude of not acting prematurely. It might be interesting to note that, at this meeting, a new element had emerged, Japan's entry into war. Both Bose and Shedai expressed their apprehensions about Japan's real war aims of dominating Asia and used this as a further necessity to gain Germany's and Italy's clear support for Indian national aims. External Reference 7. Bose had to cooperate (and compete) with Shedai, take his help in setting up his own radio infrastructure, even staff, and retained even the name of Shedai's organization "Azad Hindustan" with a minor abridgement as "Azad Hind".8.

=== Pan-Islamism ===
After the end of WWII and the creation of Pakistan, Shedai would turn to Pan-Islamism, having founded in 1948 the World Muslim Association of Pakistan, serving as its inaugural secretary-general as well.

== On My Way Back ==
Dr. Iqbal Shidai had compiled his return travelogue "My Way Back" but it was never published. In this travelogue, Dr. Shidai described in detail how Maulana Abdul Kalam Azad helped him on his return journey and made it possible for him to get a passport. And on his return home.

"On 14th Sepatember, 1946, His eminence Maulana Abul Kalam Aazad wrote to me from Masoori in which he advised me to return to India as soon as possible because, he said, that all patriots must come back to Delhi."

"The reason was that I had been asked by Maulana Azad to reach India as soon as possible. Sardar Ajit Singh who had met both Mr. Nehru and the Maulana wrote to me that they had decided to appoint me as the Indian ambassador to Italy.

The second reason was that all my life I had been working for Indian Independence and I had no notion of Pakistan although I had read something about it in the London Times in the year 1933."

He also compiled how he countered the false propaganda against the Muslims of India in the Arab countries.

=== Pakistan Day Cairo, Egypt ===
Dr. Iqbal Shedai celebrated Pakistan Day on 23-8-1947, in Cairo, Egypt. and delivered a speech

"Ladies and Gentlemen-Assalam-o-aleikum wa Rahmatullah,

On behalf of the Pakistanis here in Egypt and elsewhere in the world, I thank you and through you, your respected kings, presidents, and nations for joining us in our rejoicing and happiness for the historic achievement of our freedom and independence.

I assure you, brethren, that we shall never forget your kindness and sympathy shown to us in these last 8 days.

Through press and platform. I pray to Allah Karim that those of our brethren who are still suffering under the foreign yoke should see the most happy days.

As we the Pakistanis are seeing and enjoying. They must rest assured that we are and shall remain with them spiritually in their adversity and in their happiness as well.

Gentlemen, much has been said and written about my newly-born country and its great and illustrious leader-Quad-i-Azam Mohammed Ali Jinnah I, there Fore need not repeat the same things at this moment as we have very limited time at our disposal and secondly the weather, too, does not permit us to remain closed in this hall. I would simply tell you in a few words that our freedom which we have snatched from our foes is the work of only one person.

Our dearest quad-i-Azam Mohammed Ali Jinnah. Before this great son of Islam took the reins of our leadership, we did not know what we were struggling for.

Our old leaders had no clear-out program to put before us. We were wandering behind them in an unlimited wilderness without any aim or object. This man was sent by God Almighty to lead us to victory, light, and freedom. In six years only he got back that most precious and dearest gem of liberty which had been snatched from us by the British a century and a half ago.

"Gentlemen this brave and courageous man was alone in the midst of a terrible whirlwind of taunts from both our friends and foes. Some called him a lackey of the British Imperialists and others called him the enemy of India and of the whole East. But that great Son of Islam stood like a rock amidst this stormy ocean of human taunts."

His only reply to his friends and foes was, I shall get for my people a free and independent PAKISTAN.

He succeeded in his aims and today we are here to congratulate him and his happy nation, The Pakistan, Free and independent Pakistan is a great boon for the East in general and for the Muslim peoples in particular. We are not imperialists but we shall fight against any eventual enemy to the last man for the freedom and independence of our fatherland which our QUAD-i-AZAM has entrusted us. At the same time, we shall help those of our brothers who are suffering under foreign yoke and are struggling for their freedom."

This travel book is still in the archives of the Government of Pakistan.

== Family life ==
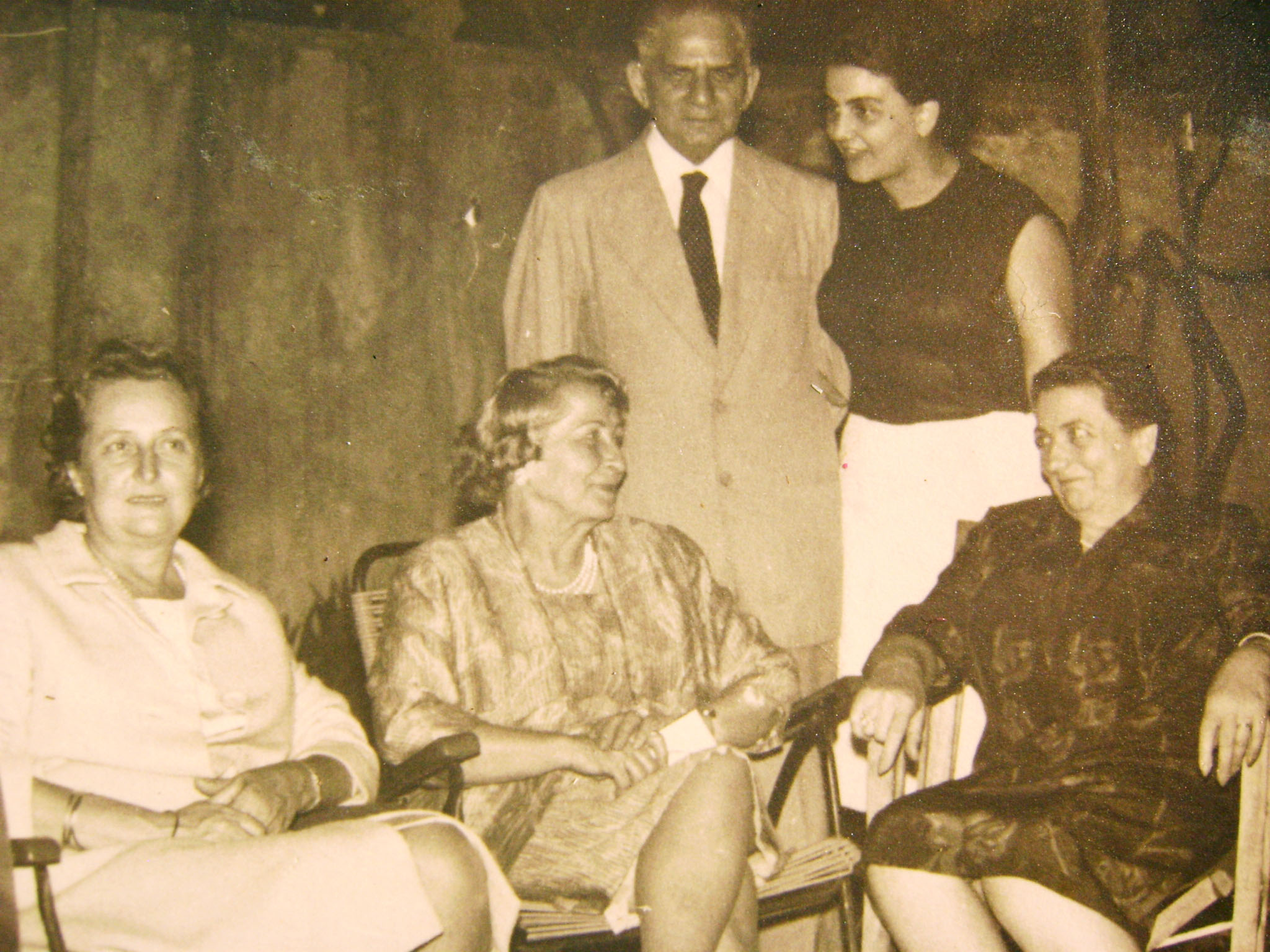
Iqbal Shedai with his wife and other family members in Paris, France

Muhammad Iqbal Shedai is at the sixth from left, in white turban, with Lt Col. Inverea at eight, Ajit Singh at fourteenth and other officers of Battalion Azad Hindustan

Shedai decided to leave for France where he landed in Marseilles, a part of France. For a decade from 1930 to 1939, he lived in Paris.

== Last years and death ==
After the partition of India in 1947, he moved with his French wife in Lahore for some years, before leaving for Italy and teaching Urdu at Turin University because of the apathy and enmity from the government for his progressive ideas. After refusing an Indian citizenship because "as a Pakistani he could not betray his soil", he returned to Lahore, Pakistan, in 1964, dying on 13 January 1974. He is buried in Miani Sahib Graveyard in Mozang, Lahore.

== Sources ==
- Shedai Papers, preserved by Dr. Muhammad Jamal Bhutta, the younger brother of Muhammad Iqbal Shedai.
- M. Phil: Thesis on Iqbal Shedai, the Revolutionary by M. Gulzar Awan of history department, University of the Punjab.
- Daily Imroaz newspaper from Lahore
- History of Sialkot by Isfaq Niaz page 560.

== External sources ==
- A forum discussion on Radio Himala and Iqbal Shedai.
- The Battaglione Azad Hindostan and Iqbal Shedai.
- Media at the time of Mussolini and Tucci, a fascist radio in Kabul.
- Shedai, Mussolini and the mission in Afghanistan.
- Raggruppamento "Frecce Rosse"
- The free Indian legion Chapter 3
- Page 15,16 Speech of Italian AMBASSADOR ALESSANDRO QUARONI
- Subhas Chandra Bose – Another Look Part 5
- Radio Himalaya Discussion forum on Axis History
