= Free India Centre =

European branch of Azad Hind provisional government

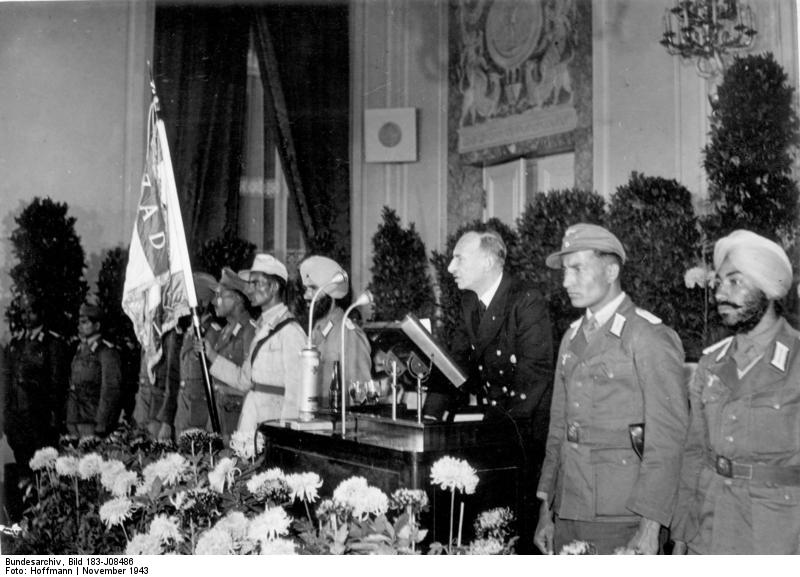
A ceremony marking the establishment of the Provisional Government of Free India held by the Free India Centre in Berlin, with soldiers of the Indian Legion and German and Indian dignitaries present

The Free India Centre (German: Zentrale Freies Indien) was the European branch of the Azad Hind, provisional government led by Subhas Chandra Bose. It was founded by Bose when he was in Nazi Germany in 1942, and headed by A. C. N. Nambiar.

Its responsibilities included managing relations with the European Axis powers, supporting and recruiting volunteers for the Indian Legion of the Waffen-SS, running Azad Hind Radio, and preparing for the much larger provisional government that was formed in southeast Asia with Japanese support. While its main base was in Berlin, it also had branch offices in occupied Paris and in Italy. On its establishment in Berlin, the Free India Centre was essentially given the status of a diplomatic mission by Nazi Germany. It had an office at No. 2A Lichtensteiner Allee in Tiergarten, although its activities were for some time mostly conducted in hotels or Bose's eventual house on Sophienstrasse in Charlottenburg.
