= Azad Hind Radio =

South Asian pro-Axis radio station

Azad Hind Radio (transl. Free India Radio) was a radio service that was started under the leadership of Subhas Chandra Bose in 1942 to encourage Indians to fight against the British. Though initially based in Nazi Germany, its headquarters were shifted to Japanese occupied Singapore following the course of the war in Southeast Asia. After Netaji's departure to Southeast Asia, the German operations were continued by A. C. N. Nambiar, the head of the Indian Legion in Nazi Germany and later ambassador of the Arzi Hukumate Azad Hind in Germany.

The station broadcast weekly news bulletins in English, Hindi, Tamil, Bengali, Marathi, Punjabi, Pashto and Urdu, the languages spoken by most potential volunteers for the Indian Legion in Germany and the Indian National Army in southeast Asia.

Azad Hind Radio aimed to counter the broadcasts of Allied radio stations. On Azad Hind Radio, Bose referred to the British Broadcasting Corporation as the Bluff and Bluster Corporation and All India Radio as the Anti-Indian Radio.

== Operations ==
Subhas Chandra Bose set up the Free India Centre in Berlin in the then Nazi Germany and at the same time set up Azad Hind Radio within Germany's radio service and was initially funded by the Germans. The station was set up as a shortwave station and broadcast for the first time on 7 January 1942. It focused on driving anti-allied force messages and messages seeking Indian independence directed at Indians living abroad and those in the Indian subcontinent. It beamed news bulletins in English, Hindi, Tamil, Bengali, Marathi, Punjabi, Pashto, Gujarati and Urdu. The station's headquarters shifted to Rangoon in Myanmar and later to Singapore (Cathay Building, 2 Handy Road, Singapore 229233) following the war in south-east Asia. Speaking of Bose's plans for the station in the initial days, his second-in-command A. C. N. Nambiar would later depose that Bose had initially wanted to launch two additional radio stations, one called 'Congress Radio' that would be aimed at the supporters of Gandhi and another called 'Azad Muslim Radio' to counter the actions of the Muslim League. He had wanted to initially keep the stations secret to give the impression that the content was being broadcast from some location in India.

In addition to news programming, the station broadcast messages from Bose and his Azad Hind Fauj (Indian National Army). It was on this station that Bose declared war against Britain and the allied forces on October 23, 1943. The Azad Hind programme on the station that was initiated would start with Bahadur Shah Zafar, the last Mughal emperor's recorded voice, "Ghazio mein by rahegi jab talak iman ki, Tab toh London tak chalegi regh hindustan ki" (transl. So long as the crusaders are inspired by faith, the Indian sword will continue to sweep up to London). Zafar spent his last few years in Rangoon, where the station was then based. The programming on the station was largely considered Nazi German propaganda against the British actions in the region. The BBC launched its own Eastern Service station in the early 1940s to counter propaganda by stations like the Azad Hind Radio.

The station continued operations until June 1945 even after Bose's Indian National Army was defeated by the British in 1944.

== See also ==
- Propaganda and India in World War II
