= Battaglione Azad Hindoustan =

- Italian: Battaglione India libera
- Muhammad Iqbal Shedai is at the sixth from left, in a white turban, with Lt Col. Massimo Invrea at eight, Ajit Singh at fourteenth and other officers of Battalion Azad Hindustan
- Active: May 1942 – November 1942
- Country: Kingdom of Italy
- Branch: Royal Italian Army
- Type: Airborne forces Motorized infantry
- Size: c. 400 (maximum)
- Garrison/HQ: Rome

Commanders
- Notable commanders: Mohammad Iqbal Shedai; Luigi Vismara

Battaglione Azad Hindoustan (in Italian: Battaglione India libera - "Free India Battalion") was a foreign legion unit formed in Fascist Italy under the Raggruppamento Centri Militari in July 1942. The unit, raised initially as Centro I, was headed by Mohammad Iqbal Shedai – a long term Indian resident of Rome – and comprised Indian former prisoners of war from British India.

Raised along with units dedicated to Tunisia (Centro T) and the Arabs (Centro A), it was tasked with airborne operations for sabotage behind enemy lines, commando style raids, frontline military intelligence gathering, guerrilla warfare, long-range penetration, maneuver warfare, and reconnaissance. A part of Centro I was renamed Battaglione Azad Hindoustan in August 1942 when the Raggruppamento Centri Militari itself was redesignated as Raggruppamento Frecce Rosse ("Red Arrows group"). By the time of its disbandment in November 1942, Battaglione Azad Hindoustan's strength came to be between 350 and 400.

Units of the Raggruppamento Frecce Rosse were intended to infiltrate on the ground, from submarines and by parachuting. Accordingly, a further unit was raised within the Battaglione Azad Hindoustan to form the plotone paracadutisti ("parachute platoon"). The chosen troops were sent for paratroopers combat training to the parachute school at Tarquinia.

== Uniform ==
The soldiers of the Battaglione Azad Hindoustan wore standard Italian military uniforms. However – unlike the troops of the German-raised Legion Freies Indien, who had peaked field caps – all the troops of the Battaglione Azad Hindoustan wore a turban of the colour of the Italian Sahariana tunic. Additionally, the troops wore on their tunics collar patches with three vertical stripes in the saffron, white and green (reflecting the colours of the Indian National Congress that was at the time the focus of the nationalist movement). Italians serving in the Battaglione Azad Hindoustan were distinguished by stars on the collar patches that were not worn by the Indian troops. The Tarquinia detachment sent for parachute training wore their own collar patches above paratroop-pattern patches, as well as the paratroop badge depicting an open yellow parachute embroidered in rayon thread on the left upper arm.

== Structure ==
According to the order of battle of the Italian Raggruppamento Centri Militari in May 1942, the unit had the following under its control: comando ("headquarters") commanded by Lieutenant Colonel Massimo Invrea; Centro T consisting of Italians from Tunisia; Centro A consisting of Italians from Egypt, Palestine, Syria and Arabia; plus Arabs and Sudanese ex-prisoners-of-war and lastly; Centro I consisting of Italians from India and Persia and Indian ex-prisoners-of-war. In all, the Raggruppamento Centri Militari collected together approximately 1,200 Italians, 400 Indians and 200 Arabs. In August 1942, the Raggruppamento was renamed Raggruppamento Frecce Rosse ("Red Arrows group") a name chosen by the commanding officer in memory of his service with the Italian Divisione Frecce Nere ("Black Arrows Division") of the Italian Corpo Truppe Volontarie ("Corps of Volunteer Troops") in the Spanish Civil War. The three Centri Militari received new designations at the same time.

According to the order of battle of the Italian Raggruppamento Frecce Rosse in August 1942, the following units comprised the force structure: comando ("headquarters"), Battaglione d'Assalto Tunisia ("Tunisia Assault Battalion"), which was formerly Centro T; Gruppo Italo-Arabo ("Italo-Arab Group"), formerly Centro A; and Battaglione Azad Hindoustan ("Free Indian Battalion"), formerly Centro I.

The Battaglione Azad Hindoustan was created out of Centro I using both the ex-Indian Army personnel (the Indian Army was under British operational command) and Italians previously resident in India and Persia (Iran).

The order of battle of the Battaglione Azad Hindoustan in August 1942 was:

- Compagnia fucilieri ("motorized rifle company")
- Compagnia mitraglieri ("motorized machine gun company")
- Plotone paracadutisti ("parachute platoon")
- Overseas Italian platoon

== Disbandment ==
Despite their investment in training the Indians in infiltration combat, the Italians considered the Indian troops of Battaglione Azad Hindoustan to be of doubtful loyalty and this view was confirmed when the Indians mutinied on learning of the Axis defeat at El Alamein in November 1942. Following this, the battalion was disbanded and the Indians returned to their prisoner-of-war camps.

== See also ==
- Indian National Army
- Indian Legion
- Arzi Hukumat-e-Azad Hind

== Bibliography ==
- Lundari, Giuseppe (2005). I Paracadutisti Italiani 1937-45. Editrice Militare Italiana. ISBN 978-600-01-8031-7.
