= Operation Bajadere =

Disputed special forces operation of World War II

Operation Bajadere is a disputed special forces operation of World War II.

Some sources state that it was launched in January 1942 by a paratroop force about 100 strong of the Indian Legion. The forces were tasked to infiltrate into India through Baluchistan and commence sabotage operations against the British assets in preparation for an anticipated national revolt in India against the Raj.

The Abwehr had actively sought out Hindu and Muslim recruits for a planned strike through the Caucasus into Iran, India and Afghanistan. The 100-man unit, derived from what came to be known as the Indian Legion, was trained by the German Army's special forces, the Brandenburgers. In January 1942, the unit was parachuted into Persia and infiltrated India. They engaged in sabotage, attempted to create dissent and worked towards a popular revolt against British rule. Oberleutnant Witzel, the Abwehr attaché at Kabul, reported several months later that the operations had been successful. However, the defeat at Stalingrad meant that no major offensive towards India would take place.

However, other sources state that this operation was never conducted. For instance, historian Adrian O'Sullivan has written that it is "mythical", and "there is no basis for this operation in the records". He notes that the Indian Legion was not formed until August 1942, and such an operation was logistically impossible for the Germans to have executed.
