= Indian Legion =

Indian volunteer unit in Nazi Germany

Free India Legion
- German: Legion Freies Indien
- Flag of the Indian Legion
- Active: 1941 – May 1945
- Country: Germany
- Allegiance: Adolf Hitler
- Branch: German Army (1941–1944); Waffen-SS (1944–1945)
- Type: Infantry
- Size: 4,500 (maximum)
- Garrison/HQ: Königsbrück; Lager Heuberg
- Nicknames: "Tiger Legion" "Azad Hind Fauj"
- Engagements: World War II; Atlantic Wall; Italian Front; Retreat from France; Battle of Berlin

Commanders
- Notable commanders: Subhas Chandra Bose; Heinz Bertling

Insignia
- Badge

- Banner

The Indian Legion (German: Indische Legion), officially the Free India Legion (German: Legion Freies Indien) or 950th (Indian) Infantry Regiment (German: Infanterie-Regiment 950 (indisches)), was a military unit raised during the Second World War initially as part of the German Army and later the Waffen-SS from August 1944. Intended to serve as a liberation force for British-ruled India, it was made up of Indian prisoners of war and expatriates in Europe. Owing to its origins in the Indian independence movement, it was known also as the "Tiger Legion", and the "Azad Hind Fauj". As part of the Waffen-SS it was known as the Indian Volunteer Legion of the Waffen-SS (German: Indische Freiwilligen Legion der Waffen-SS). The transfer to the Waffen-SS was never fully executed and many members of the unit refused to wear the new uniforms and insignia.

Indian independence leader Subhas Chandra Bose initiated the legion's formation, as part of his efforts to win India's independence by waging war against Britain, when he came to Berlin in 1941 seeking German aid. The initial recruits in 1941 were volunteers from the Indian students resident in Germany at the time, and a handful of the Indian prisoners of war who had been captured during the North African campaign. It later drew a larger number of Indian prisoners of war as volunteers.

Though it was initially raised as an assault group that would form a pathfinder to a German–Indian joint invasion of the western frontiers of British India, only a small contingent was ever put to its original intended purpose. A small contingent, including much of the Indian officer corps and enlisted leadership, was transferred to the Indian National Army in South-East Asia. The majority of the troops of the Indian Legion were given only non-combat duties in the Netherlands and in France until the Allied invasion. They saw action in the retreat from the Allied advance across France, fighting mostly against the French Resistance. One company was sent to Italy in 1944, where it saw action against British and Polish troops and undertook anti-partisan operations.

At the time of the surrender of Nazi Germany in 1945, the remaining men of the Indian Legion made efforts to march to neutral Switzerland over the Alps, but they were captured by American and French troops and eventually shipped back to India to face charges of treason. However, the courts-martial of Indians who served with the Axis were not completed due to widespread outrage among soldiers and civilians.

== Background ==
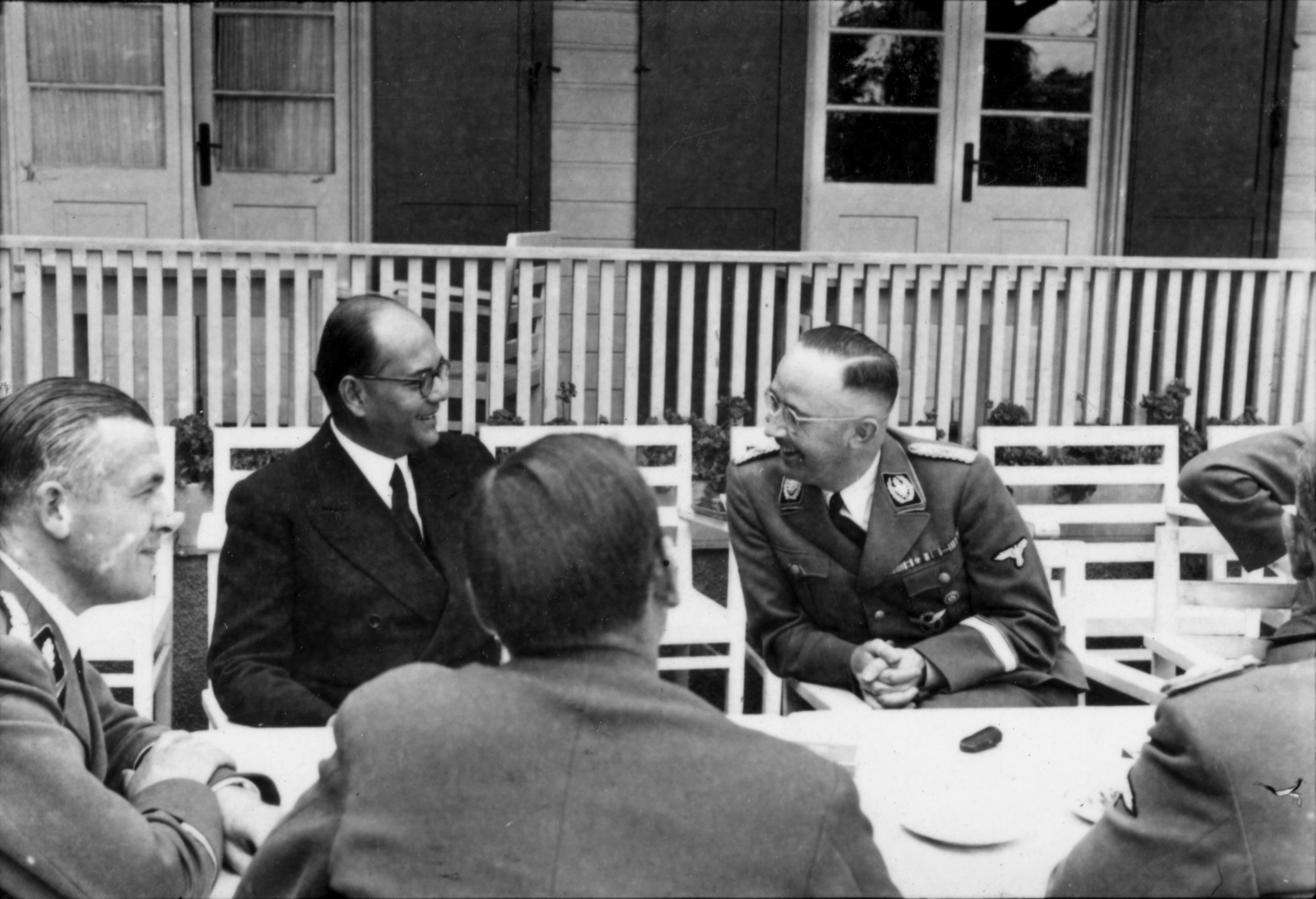
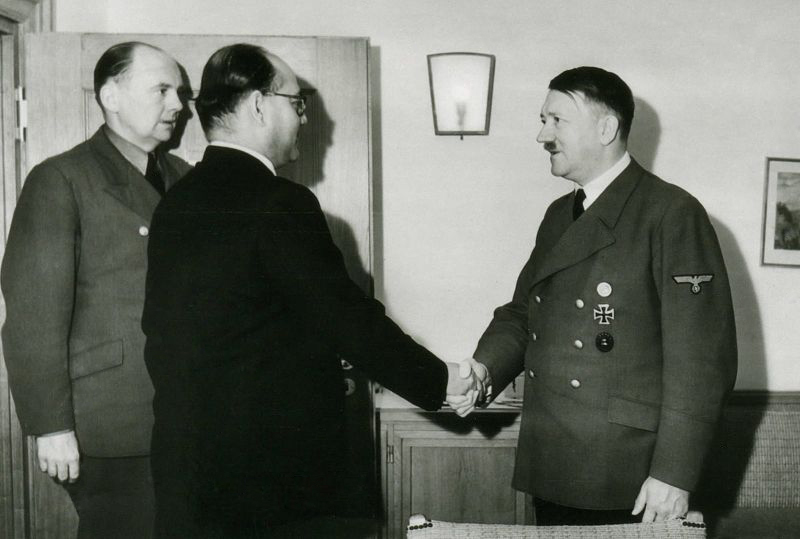
(left) Bose with Heinrich Himmler, the Nazi Minister of Interior, head of the SS, and the Gestapo, 1942; (right) Subhas Bose meeting Adolf Hitler

The idea of raising an armed force that would fight its way into India to bring down the British Raj goes back to the First World War, when the Ghadar Party and the then nascent Indian Independence League formulated plans to initiate rebellion in the British Indian Army from Punjab to Hong Kong with German support. This plan failed after information leaked to British intelligence, but only after many attempts at mutiny, and a 1915 mutiny of Indian troops in Singapore. During World War II, all three of the major Axis powers sought to support armed revolutionary activities in India, and aided the recruitment of a military force from Indian prisoners of war (POWs) captured while serving in the British Indian Army, and Indian expatriates.

The most notable and successful Indian force to fight with the Axis was the Indian National Army (INA) in southeast Asia, that came into being with the support of the Japanese Empire in April 1942. Fascist Italy also created the Azad Hindustan Battalion (Italian: Battaglione Azad Hindoustan) in February 1942. This unit was formed from Indian POWs from their Centro I POW camp, and Italians previously resident in India and Persia, and ultimately served under the Ragruppamento Centri Militari alongside units of Arabs and colonial Italians. However, the effort had little acceptance from the Indians in the unit, who did not wish to serve under Italian officers. After Italy lost the Second Battle of El Alamein, the Indians mutinied when told to fight in Libya. Consequently, the remnants of the battalion were disbanded in November 1942.

Although the Indian National Congress (INC), the organisation leading the struggle for Indian independence, had passed resolutions conditionally supporting the fight against fascism, some Indian public opinion was more hostile toward Britain's unilateral decision to declare India a belligerent on the side of the Allies. Among the more rebellious Indian political leaders of the time was Subhas Chandra Bose, a former INC president, who was viewed as a potent enough threat by the British that he was arrested when the war started. Bose escaped from house arrest in India in January 1941 and made his way through Afghanistan to the Soviet Union, with some help from Germany's military intelligence service, the Abwehr. Bose, ideologically a Communist was inclined to the Soviet Union for aid.

Once he reached Moscow, he did not receive the expected Soviet support for his plans for a popular uprising in India. The Soviets were navigating a complex geopolitical and strategic web and did not want to break any potential alliance with the Allies in case of an impending German invasion. The German ambassador in Moscow, Count von der Schulenberg, soon arranged for Bose to go to Berlin. He arrived at the beginning of April 1941, and he met with foreign minister Joachim von Ribbentrop and later Adolf Hitler. In Berlin, Bose set up the Free India Centre and Azad Hind Radio, which commenced broadcasting to Indians on shortwave radio frequencies, reaching tens of thousands of Indians who had shortwave receivers. Soon Bose's aim became to raise an army, which he imagined would march into India with German forces and trigger the downfall of the Raj.

== Origin ==
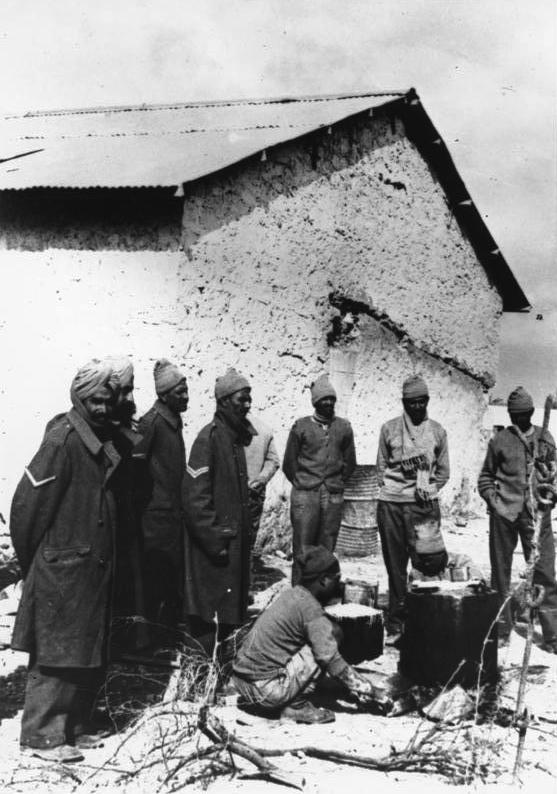
Indian POWs in Derna, Libya, 1941.

The first troops of the Indian Legion were recruited from Indian POWs captured at El Mekili, Libya during the battles for Tobruk. The German forces in the Western Desert selected a core group of 27 POWs as potential officers and they were flown to Berlin in May 1941, to be followed, after the Centro I experiment, by POWs being transferred from the Italian forces to Germany. The number of POWs transferred to Germany grew to about 10,000 who were eventually housed at Annaburg camp, where Bose first met with them. A first group of 300 volunteers from the POWs and Indians expatriates in Germany were sent to Frankenberg camp near Chemnitz, to train and convince arriving POWs to join the legion.

As the numbers of POWs joining the legion swelled, the legion was moved to Königsbrück for further training. It was at Königsbrück that uniforms were first issued, in German feldgrau with the badge of the leaping tiger of Azad Hind. The formation of the Indian National Army was announced by the German Propaganda Ministry in January 1942. It did not, however, take oath until 26 August 1942, as the Legion Freies Indien of the German Army. By May 1943, the numbers had swelled, aided by the enlistment as volunteers of Indian expatriates.

Overall, there were about 15,000 Indian POWs in Europe, primarily held in Germany by 1943. While some remained loyal to the King-Emperor and treated Bose and the Legion with contempt, most were at least somewhat sympathetic to Bose's cause. While approximately 2,000 became legionnaires, some others did not complete their training owing to various reasons and circumstances. The maximum size of the Legion was 4,500.

Bose sought and obtained agreement from the German High Command for the rather remarkable terms under which the Legion would serve in German military. German soldiers would train the Indians in all branches of infantry and motorized units in using weapons under the strictest military discipline, in the same way a German formation was trained; the Indian legionnaires were not to be mixed with any German structures; they were not to be sent to any front other than in India for fighting against the British, but would be allowed to fight in self-defence at any other place. In all other respects, the legionnaires would enjoy the same facilities and amenities regarding pay, clothing, food, leave, etc., as German soldiers. As for the unit's eventual deployments in the Netherlands and France, they were ostensibly for training purposes, according to Bose's plans for the unit to be trained in some aspects of coastal defence. After the invasion of France by the Allies, the unit was ordered back to Germany, so that it would not participate in fighting for German military interests.

== Organization ==
=== Composition ===
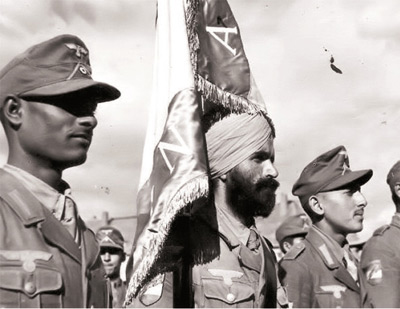
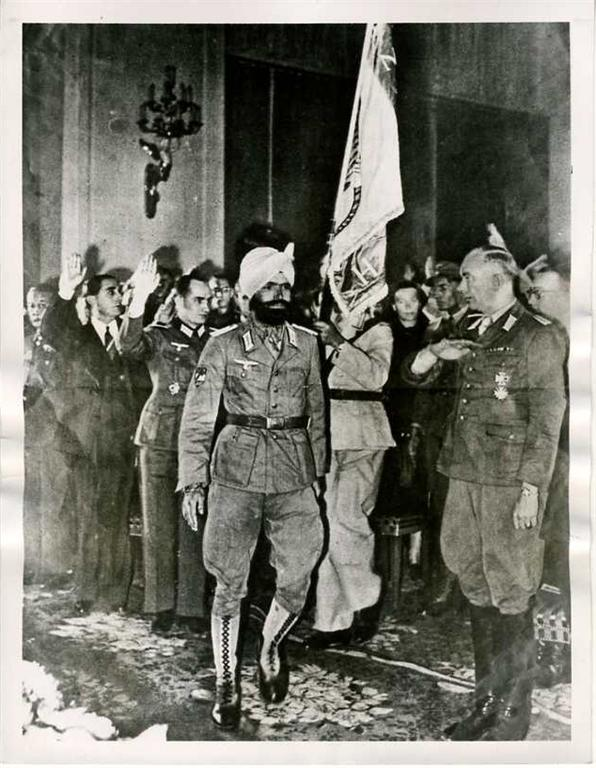
(left) Soldiers of the Indian Legion, circa 1943; (right) A Sikh Soldier of the Azad Hind Fauj at a function in Berlin

The British Indian Army organised regiments and units on the basis of religion and regional or caste identity. Bose sought to end this practice and build up one unified Indian identity among the men who would fight for independence. Consequently, the Indian Legion was organised as mixed units so that Hindus, Muslims, Sikhs all served side by side. Sources gave varying demographics for the Legion. Most sources put the demographics at two thirds Hindus, and one third other religions such as Muslims, Sikhs and Christians. According to reports the unit consisted of 59 percent Hindus, 25 percent Muslims, 14 percent Sikhs and 2 percent Christians and Buddhists. (The proportion of Sikhs later rose to as high as 20 percent.) Compared to the distribution in the British Indian Army fighting the Germans, where Muslims made up 34 percent, Hindus 41 percent, and Sikhs 11 percent with Gurkhas and others making up 14 percent, the Indian Legion had a high proportion of Hindus and Sikhs and comparatively few Muslims. (In fact, the Muslim League was the only major Indian Independence movement that supported the British war effort.)

The success of Bose's idea of developing a unified national identity was evident when Heinrich Himmler proposed in late 1943, after Bose's departure, that the Muslim soldiers of the I.R. 950 be recruited into the new Handschar Division. The commander of the SS Head Office, Gottlob Berger, was obliged to point out that while the Bosnians of the "Handschar" perceived themselves as European, Indian Muslims perceived themselves as Indians. Hitler, however, showed little enthusiasm for the I.R. 950, at one stage insisting that their weapons be handed over to the newly created 18th SS Horst Wessel Division, exclaiming that "…the Indian Legion is a joke!"

=== Uniform and standard ===
The uniform issued to the Indian Legion were the standard German Army uniform of feldgrau in winter and khaki in summer. Additionally, the troops wore on their right upper arm a specially designed arm badge in the shape of a shield with three horizontal stripes of saffron, white, and green and with a leaping tiger on the white middle band. The legend Freies Indien was inscribed in black on a white background above the tricolor. A saffron, white, and green transfer was also worn on the left side of their steel helmets, similar to the black, white, and red decal German soldiers wore on their helmets. Sikhs in the legion were permitted to wear a turban as dictated by their religion instead of the usual peaked field cap, of a colour appropriate to their uniform.

The Legion's transfer to the Waffen-SS meant they would be issued new uniforms and insignia. These were to follow the trend among foreign, largely non-Germanic SS units of having their own insignia as opposed to the standard SS runes. In the case of the Indian Legion, this meant most of its members would have a blank collar tab alongside their rank insignia. There was a proposal for the Legion to have their unique collar insignia featuring a tiger's head, though extremely few of these collar tabs were actually manufactured and even less were worn by the Legion's members.

The standard of the Indian Legion, presented as the unit's colours in late 1942 or early 1943, used the same design as the arm badge previously issued to the men of the Legion. It consisted of saffron, white and green horizontal bands, from top to bottom; the white middle band was approximately three times the width of the coloured bands. The words "Azad" and "Hind" in white were inscribed over the saffron and green bands respectively, and over the white middle band was a leaping tiger. This is essentially the same design that the Azad Hind Government later adopted as their flag (although photographic evidence shows that the Indian National Army, at least during the Burma Campaign, used the Swaraj flag of the INC instead).

=== Decorations ===
In 1942, Bose instituted several medals and orders for service to Azad Hind. As was typical for German decorations, crossed swords were added when they were issued for action in combat. Nearly half of the soldiers of the legion received one of these decorations.

=== Structure and units ===
The Indian Legion was organised as a standard German army infantry regiment of three battalions of four companies each, at least initially with exclusively German commissioned officers. It has been later referred to as Panzergrenadier Regiment 950 (indische), indicating the unit was partially motorised. It was equipped with 81 motor vehicles and 700 horses. In this structure, the legion came to consist of:

- I. Bataillon – infantry companies 1 to 4
- II. Bataillon – infantry companies 5 to 8
- III. Bataillon – infantry companies 9 to 12
- 13. Infanteriegeschütz Kompanie (infantry-gun company – armed with six 7.5 cm leichtes Infanteriegeschütz 18)
- 14. Panzerjäger Kompanie (anti-tank company – armed with six Panzerabwehrkanone)
- 15. Pionier Kompanie (engineer company)
- Ehrenwachkompanie (honour guard company)

It also included hospital, training, and maintenance staff.

== Operations ==
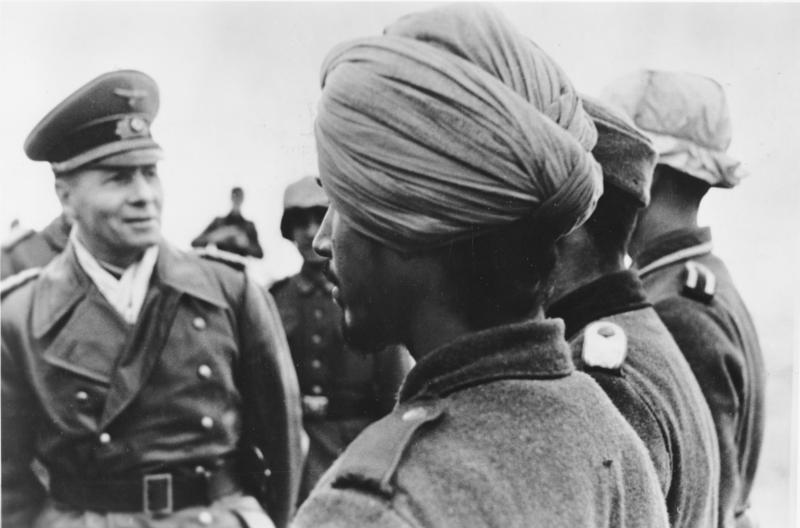
Field Marshal Erwin Rommel inspecting a unit of the Indian Legion at the Atlantic Wall in France, 10 February 1944.

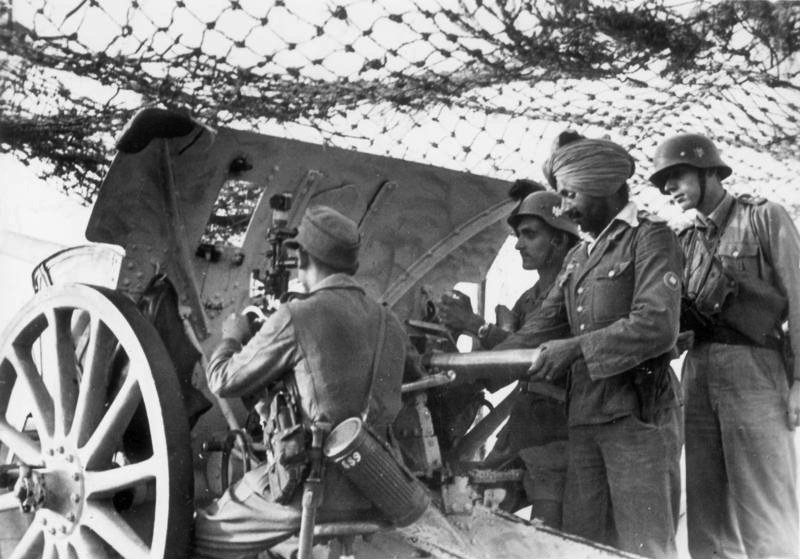
Shooting at sea targets from the Atlantic Wall in France, February 1944.

It is doubtful that Subhas Chandra Bose envisaged the Free India Legion would ever be an army sufficient or strong enough to conduct an effective campaign across Persia into India on its own. Instead, the IR 950 was to become a pathfinder, preceding a larger Indo-German force in a Caucasian campaign into the western frontiers of British India, that would encourage public resentment of the Raj and incite the British Indian Army into revolt.

Following German defeat in Europe at Stalingrad and in North Africa at El Alamein, it became clear that an Axis assault through Persia or even the Soviet Union was unlikely. Meanwhile, Bose had travelled to the Far East, where the Indian National Army was able to engage the Allies alongside the Japanese Army in Burma, and ultimately in northeastern India. The German Naval High Command at this time made the decision to transfer much of the leadership and a segment of the Free India Legion to South Asia, and on 21 January they were formally made a part of the Indian National Army. Most troops of the Indian Legion, however, remained in Europe through the war and were never utilised in their originally planned role.

Adrian Weale has written that about 100 members of the Indian Legion were parachuted into eastern Persia in January 1942 tasked with infiltrating Baluchistan Province as Operation Bajadere. However, Adrian O'Sullivan has described such an operation as being "mythical", as it was logistically impossible, and there is no documentary evidence of it taking place.

=== Netherlands and France ===
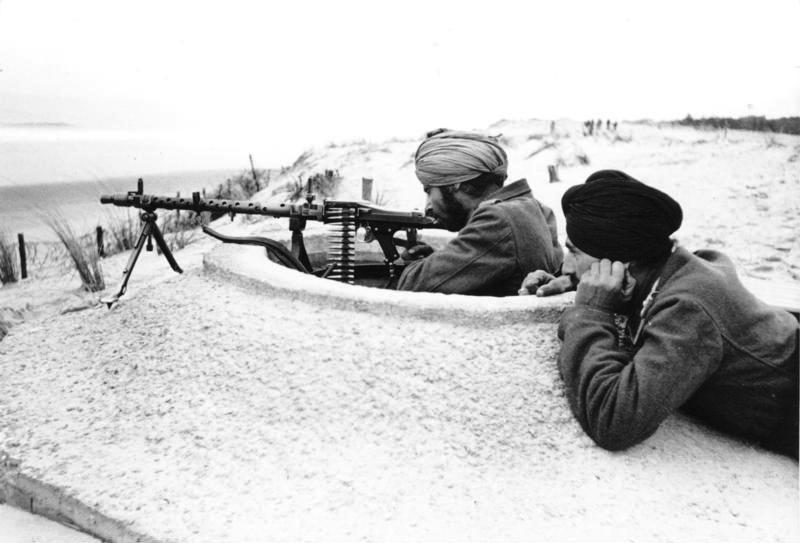
Troops of the Indian Legion at the Atlantic Wall near Bordeaux, France, March 1944.

The legion was transferred to Zeeland in the Netherlands in April 1943 as part of the Atlantic Wall and later to France in September 1943, attached to the 344th Infantry Division and later the 159th Infantry Division of the Wehrmacht. From Beverloo in Belgium, the 1st Battalion was reassigned to Zandvoort in May 1943 where they stayed until relieved by the Georgian Legion in August. In September 1943, the battalion was deployed on the Atlantic coast of Bordeaux on the Bay of Biscay. The 2nd Battalion moved from Beverloo to the island of Texel in May 1943 and stayed there until relieved that September. From here, it was deployed to Les Sables-d'Olonne in France. The 3rd Battalion remained at Oldebroek as Corps Reserve until the end of September 1943, where they gained a "wild and loathsome" reputation amongst the locals.

=== Transfer to the Waffen-SS ===
The legion was stationed in the Lacanau (near Bordeaux) at the time of the Normandy landings, and remained there for up to two months after D-Day. In July 1944, the legion was tasked with suppressing the French Resistance and capturing civilians for forced labour. Whilst suppressing the French resistance in August 1944, 25 legionaries deserted to the French Resistance. Despite being promised that they would be handed over to Allied Forces, the group of legionaries were executed by anarchist elements of the resistance. On 8 August 1944 Himmler authorised the legion's control to be transferred to the Waffen-SS, as was that of every other foreign volunteer unit of the German Army.

The unit was renamed the Indische Freiwilligen Legion der Waffen-SS. Command of the legion was very shortly transferred from Obersturmbannführer Kurt Krapp to Oberführer Heinz Bertling. The Indian personnel noticed a change of command was at hand and started to complain. Noting he wasn't "wanted", Bertling soon agreed to be relieved of command. On 15 August, the unit pulled out of Lacanau to make its way back to Germany. On the second leg of this journey, from Poitiers to Châteauroux, it suffered its first combat casualty, Lieutenant Ali Khan, while engaging French regular forces in the town of Dun. The unit also engaged with Allied armour at Nuits-Saint-Georges while retreating across the Loire to Dijon. It was regularly harassed by the French Resistance, suffering two more casualties (Lieutenant Kalu Ram and Captain Mela Ram). The unit moved from Remiremont through Alsace to Camp Heuberg in Germany in the winter of 1944, where it stayed until March 1945.

=== Italy ===
The 9th Company of the Legion (from the 2nd Battalion) also saw action in Italy. Having been deployed in the spring of 1944, it faced the British V Corps and the Polish II Corps, until it was withdrawn from the front to be used in anti-partisan operations. It surrendered in Italy to the Allied forces in April 1945.

=== End of the Legion ===
With the defeat of the Third Reich imminent in May 1945, the remainder of the Indian Legion stationed in Germany sought sanctuary in neutral Switzerland. They undertook a desperate 2.6-kilometre (1.6 mi) march along the shores of Lake Constance, attempting to enter Switzerland via the alpine passes. This was unsuccessful, and the legion was captured by US and French forces and delivered to British and Indian forces in Europe. The captured troops were later shipped back to India, where a number were tried for treason. After the uproar the trials of Indians who served with the Axis caused among civilians and the military of British India, the legion members' sentences were commuted.

== Legacy ==
The integral association of the Free India Legion with Nazi Germany and the other Axis powers means its legacy is seen from two viewpoints, similarly to other nationalist movements that were aligned with Germany during the war, such as the Russian Vlasov movement. One viewpoint sees it as a collaborationist unit of the Third Reich; the other views it as the realisation of a liberation army to fight against the British Raj.

Unlike the Indian National Army, conceived with the same doctrine, it has had little exposure since the end of the war, even in independent India. This is because it was far removed from India, unlike Burma, and because the Legion was so much smaller than the INA and was not engaged in its originally conceived role. Bose's plans for the Legion, and even the INA, were too grandiose for their military capability, and their fate was too strongly tied to that of the Axis powers. Looking at the legacy of Azad Hind, however, historians consider both movements' military and political actions (of which the Legion was one of the earliest elements, and an integral part of Bose's plans) and the indirect effect they had on the era's events.

In German histories of the Second World War, the Legion is noted less than other foreign volunteer units. Film-maker and author Merle Kröger, however, made the 2003 mystery novel Cut! about soldiers from the Legion in France. She said she found them an excellent topic for a mystery because scarcely any Germans had heard of the Indians who volunteered for the German Army.

=== Perceptions as collaborators ===
Bose parade review of the Free India Legion at the oath ceremony, Königsbrück, Germany, August 1942

In considering the history of the Free India Legion, the most controversial aspect is its integral link to Nazi Germany, with a widespread perception that they were collaborators with Nazi Germany by virtue of their uniform, oath and field of operation. The views of the founder and leader of the Azad Hind movement, Subhas Chandra Bose, were, however, somewhat more nuanced than straightforward support for the Axis. During the 1930s Bose had organised and led protest marches against Japanese imperialism, and wrote an article attacking Japanese imperialism, although expressing admiration for other aspects of the Japanese regime. Bose's correspondence prior to 1939 also showed his deep disapproval of the racist practices and annulment of democratic institutions by the Nazis. He nonetheless expressed admiration for the authoritarian methods which he saw in Italy and Germany during the 1930s, and thought they could be used in building an independent India.

Bose's view was not necessarily shared by the men of the Free India Legion, and they were not wholly party to Nazi ideology or in collaboration with the Nazi machinery. The Legion's volunteers were not merely motivated by the chance to escape imprisonment and earn money. Indeed, when the first POWs were brought to Annaburg and met with Subhas Chandra Bose, there was marked and open hostility towards him as a Nazi propaganda puppet. Once Bose's efforts and views had gained more sympathy, a persistent query among the POWs was 'How would the legionary stand in relation to the German soldier?'. The Indians were not prepared to simply fight for Germany's interests, after abandoning their oath to the King-Emperor. The Free India Centre—in charge of the legion after the departure of Bose—faced a number of grievances from legionaries. The foremost were that Bose had abandoned them and left them entirely in German hands, and a perception that the Wehrmacht was now going to use them in the Western Front instead of sending them to fight for independence.

The attitude of the Legion's soldiers was similar to that of the Italian Battaglione Azad Hindoustan, which had been of dubious loyalty to the Axis cause—it was disbanded after a mutiny. In one instance, immediately prior to the first deployment of the Legion in the Netherlands in April 1943, after the departure of the 1st Battalion from Königsbrück, two companies within the 2nd Battalion refused to move until convinced by Indian leaders. Even in Asia, where the Indian National Army was much larger and fought the British directly, Bose faced similar obstacles at first. All of this goes to show that many of the men never possessed loyalty to the Nazi cause or ideology; the motivation of the Legion's men was to fight for India's independence. The unit did allegedly participate in atrocities, especially in the Médoc region in July 1944, and in the region of Ruffec, including rapes and child murder, and in the department of Indre during their retreat, and some elements of the unit also undertook anti-partisan operations in Italy.

=== Role in Indian independence ===
However, events that occurred within India after the war indicate that in political terms Bose may have been successful. After the war, the soldiers and officers of the Free India Legion were brought as prisoners to India, where they were to be brought to trial in courts-martial along with Indians who had been in the INA. Their stories were seen as so inflammatory that, fearing mass revolts and uprisings across the empire, the British government forbade the BBC from broadcasting about them after the war. Not much is known of any charges made against Free India Legion soldiers, but sentences issued following the Indian National Army trials that were initiated were commuted, or charges dropped, after widespread protest and several mutinies.

As a condition of independence readily agreed to by the INC, members of the Free India Legion and INA were not allowed to serve in the post-independence Indian military, but they were all released before independence.

== See also ==
- Arzi Hukumat-e-Azad Hind
- Battaglione Azad Hindoustan
- British Free Corps
- Free Arabian Legion
